= Sir Cecil Wray, 11th Baronet =

Sir Cecil Wray, 11th Baronet (c. 1678 – 9 May 1736), of Branston Hall, Lincolnshire, was an English aristocrat.

== Early life ==
He was the second son of Sir Drury Wray, 9th Baronet and Anne Casey. Among his siblings was sister, Diana Wray, who married The Ven. William Twigge, the Archdeacon of Limerick.In 1674 his father had obtained grants of land in the counties of Limerick and Tipperary, which he forfeited by his loyalty to James II, on whose side he fought at the Battle of the Boyne.

His paternal grandparents were Sir Christopher Wray, MP for Grimsby (a son of Sir William Wray, 1st Baronet), and the Hon. Albinia Cecil (daughter and co-heiress of the 1st Viscount Wimbledon). His uncle, William Wray, was created the 1st Baronet Wray, of Ashby. Another uncle was Sir Christopher Wray, 6th Baronet and his aunt, Frances Wray, married Henry Vane the Younger. His maternal grandparents were Bridget Dowdall (a daughter of Sir John Dowdall and Elizabeth Southwell) and Thomas Casey of Rathcannon, County Limerick.

== Career ==
Upon the death of his elder brother, Christopher, in December 1710, he succeeded as the 11th Baronet Wray, of Glentworth, Lincolnshire. His brother had only succeeded to the baronetcy weeks earlier upon their father's death on their father on 30 October 1710. His father had succeeded to the baronetcy from his nephew, Sir Cecil's first cousin, Sir Baptist Edward Wray, in 1689. Upon the 1714 death, without surviving issue, of Elizabeth (née Wray) Saunderson, the only child of Sir John Wray, 3rd Baronet who was a widow of Hon. Nicholas Saunderson (eldest son of the 5th Viscount Castleton), the Glentworth estates passed by entail to Sir Cecil, her next heir male. (Note: Elizabeth (née Wray) Saunderson (1663–1714) and Sir Cecil Wray, 11th Baronet, were second cousins, both being great-grandchildren of Sir William Wray, 1st Baronet. Elizabeth descended from Sir William's eldest son from his first marriage, Sir John Wray, 2nd Baronet, while Sir Cecil descended from Sir William's eldest son from his second marriage, Sir Christopher Wray.)

He served as High Sheriff of Lincolnshire in 1715 following Francis Anderson. He was himself succeeded as Sheriff by Bartholomew Burton.

== Personal life ==
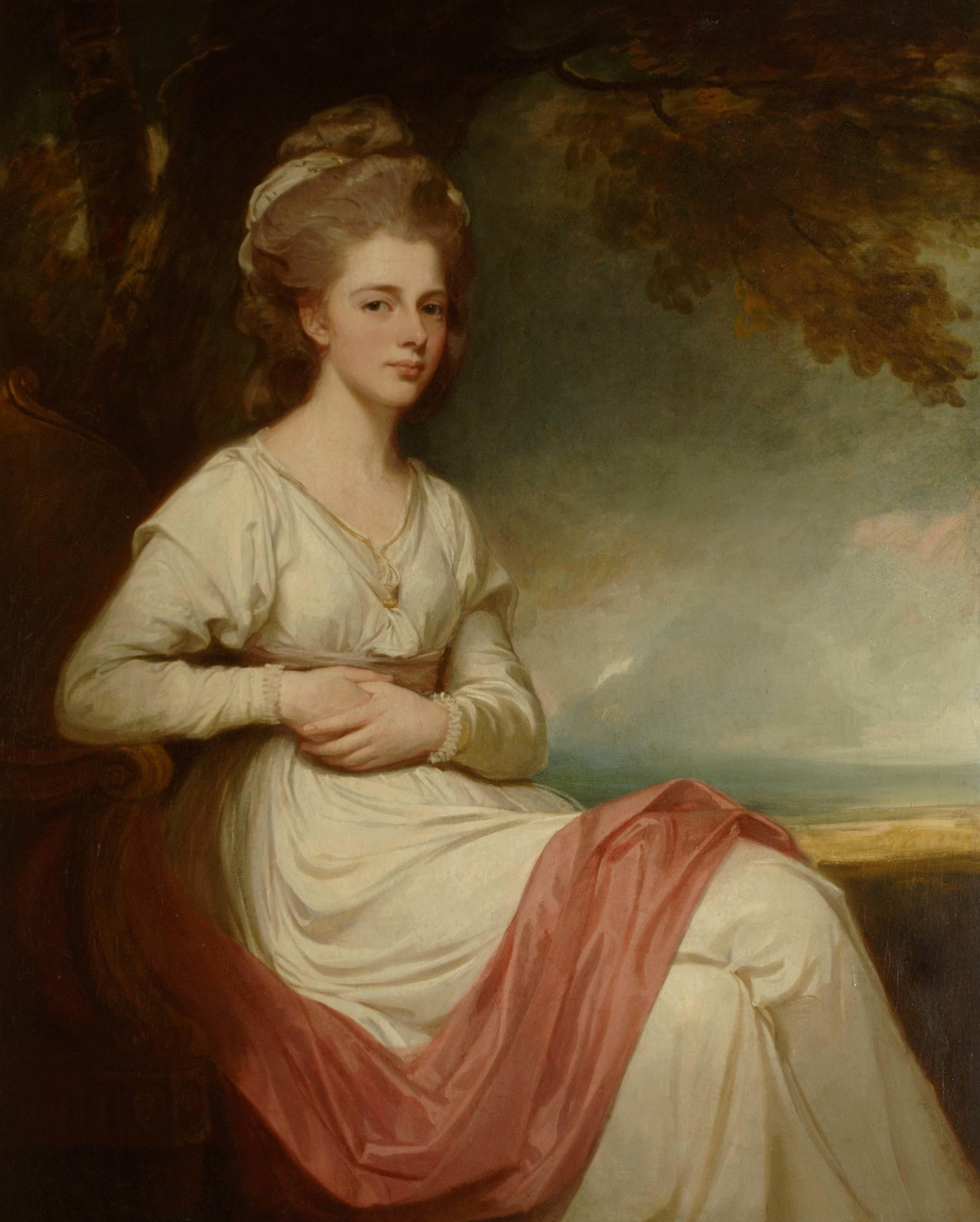
Portrait of his granddaughter, Anne Louisa Bertie, Lady Stuart (1747–1841) by George Romney, 1779–1780.

Wray, who never married, was the father of a daughter, born illegitimately:

- Anne Casey (b. c. 1726), who married Lord Vere Bertie, an MP for Boston who was the son of Robert Bertie, 1st Duke of Ancaster and Kesteven and, his second wife, Albinia Farington (nephew of Sir Edward Betenson, 1st Baronet), in 1736.

Sir Cecil died on 9 May 1736. As he died with no legitimate male issue, the title and estates passed to John Wray, of Sleningford, Yorkshire (father of Sir Cecil Wray), the son of his cousin, William Wray. In his will dated 21 January 1735, he "devised his seat at Branston, with all his fee-simple estate there, and all his messuages in Heighington, etc., in the county, to the heirs of his own body begotten or to be begotten, with remainder to Mrs. Ann Casey, his natural and reputed daughter, for life."

=== Descendants ===
Through his natural daughter Anne, he was posthumously a grandfather of Albinia Bertie (c. 1737–1816), who married George Hobart, 3rd Earl of Buckinghamshire, and Anna Louisa Bertie (1747–1841), who married Lt.-Gen. Sir Charles Stuart (fourth son of Prime Minister John Stuart, 3rd Earl of Bute).

== Notes ==
Baronetage of England
Preceded by Christopher Wray	Baronet (of Glentworth); 1710–1736	Succeeded by John Wray
