= Christopher Wray (MP) =

English politician

Sir Christopher Wray

Member of Parliament for Grimsby
- In office 1640–1646 Serving with Sir Gervase Holles
- Preceded by: Parliament suspended since 1629
- Succeeded by: Sir William Wray, Bt; Edward Rossiter
- In office 1628–1629 Serving with Henry Pelham
- Preceded by: Henry Pelham; William Skinner
- Succeeded by: Parliament suspended until 1640
- In office 1621–1625 Serving with Henry Pelham
- Preceded by: Sir John Wray; Richard Toothby
- Succeeded by: Henry Pelham; William Skinner

Personal details
- Born: 7 May 1601 Ashby, Lincolnshire
- Died: 6 February 1646 (aged 44) Market Rasen, Lincolnshire
- Spouse: Albinia Cecil (m. 1623; died 1646)
- Relations: Sir William Drury (grandfather); Elizabeth Stafford (grandmother)
- Children: 12, including Sir William, Sir Drury
- Parent(s): Sir William Wray, 1st Baronet; Frances, Lady Clifford

Sir Christopher Wray (7 May 1601 – 6 February 1646) was an English politician who sat in the House of Commons at various times between 1614 and 1646. He supported the Parliamentary cause in the English Civil War.

== Early life ==
Wray was born on 7 May 1601 at Ashby, Lincolnshire. He was the son of Sir William Wray, 1st Baronet, of Glentworth of Ashby and Barlings, Lincolnshire and, his second wife, Frances (née Drury), Lady Clifford, widow of Sir Nicholas Clifford of Bobbing, Kent. From his father's first marriage to Lucy Montagu (eldest daughter of Edward Montagu), his elder half-siblings included Sir John Wray, 2nd Baronet, Edward Wray (a Groom of the Bedchamber who married Elizabeth Norris), and Elizabeth Wray (who married Sir Francis Foljambe, 1st Baronet). From his parents' marriage, his siblings included Charles Wray (who was killed fighting in Spain), and Frances Wray (who married Sir Anthony Irby).

His paternal grandparents were Christopher Wray, the Chief Justice of the King's Bench who served as Speaker of the House of Commons, and Anne Girlington (a daughter of Nicholas Girlington of Normanby, Yorkshire). His maternal grandparents were Sir William Drury of Hawsted, Suffolk, and Elizabeth Stafford (the daughter of courtier Sir William Stafford). After her grandfather's death in 1590, her grandmother, a Lady of the Bedchamber to Queen Elizabeth I, married Sir John Scott.

== Career ==
In 1621, he was elected as a Member of Parliament for Grimsby. He was knighted on 12 November 1623. He was re-elected MP for Grimsby in 1624 and 1625. He was elected again in 1628 and sat until 1629 when King Charles decided to rule without parliament for eleven years. He successfully resisted the levy of ship money in 1636.

In April 1640, Wray was elected MP for Grimsby in the Short Parliament and was re-elected for the Long Parliament in November 1640. He was Deputy Lieutenant of Lincolnshire under the Militia Ordinance. During the First English Civil War he co-operated in the field with John Hotham. He was appointed on 15 April 1645 as commissioner of the admiralty, and on 5 December was appointed a commissioner resident with the Scottish forces besieging Newark.

== Personal life ==
On 3 August 1623, at St Mary's Church, Wimbledon, Wray married Albinia Cecil (1603–1703), daughter of Sir Edward Cecil (later 1st Viscount Wimbledon) and Theodosia Noel (a daughter of Sir Andrew Noel). Together, they had six sons and six daughters, including:

- Frances Wray (c. 1624–1679), who married Sir Henry Vane the Younger, the eldest child of Sir Henry Vane the Elder, in 1640.
- Sir William Wray, 1st Baronet (1625–1669), who was created a baronet in June 1660; he married Olympia Tufton, second daughter of Sir Humfrey Tufton, 1st Baronet of The Mote, Kent.
- Edward Wray (1627–1685), who married Dorothy (née Horsey) Fane, widow of Hon. George Fane (son of the 1st Earl of Westmorland) and daughter and heiress of James Horsey of Honington, Warwickshire, in 1652. From her previous marriage, she was the mother of Sir Henry Fane.
- Sir Drury Wray, 9th Baronet (1633–1710), who succeeded to his grandfather's baronetcy; he married Anne Casey, daughter of Thomas Casey of Rathcannon, County Limerick, and Bridget Dowdall (a daughter of Sir John Dowdall and Elizabeth Southwell).
- Elizabeth Wray (1635–1658), who married Sir William Eliot, a son of Sir William Eliot, MP for Haslemere, in 1652. After her death in 1658, he married Barbara Godfrey.
- Albinia Wray (1640–1704), who married Richard Betenson, son of Sir Richard Betenson, 1st Baronet, in 1656.
- Cecil Wray (1643–1669), who married Susan Cressey, a daughter of Arthur Cressy and Susanna Thorold, in 1662.
- Theodosia Wray (c. 1645–c. 1695), who married Rowland Laugharne, a son of Maj-Gen. Rowland Laugharne, MP for Pembroke.

Sir Christopher died on 8 February 1646 in Market Rasen, Lincolnshire.

=== Descendants ===
Through his eldest son William, he was a grandfather of Sir Christopher Wray, who became the 2nd Baronet (of Ashby) in 1669 and, on the extinction of the male line of the elder branch of the family in 1672, succeeded to the Glentworth baronetcy as the 6th Baronet. Sir Christopher died without issue in August 1679 and was succeeded by his only surviving brother, Sir William Wray, 7th Baronet (of Glentworth) and 3rd Baronet (of Ashby). Upon his death in c. March 1685–6, the junior baronetcy became extinct. The 6th and 7th Baronets sister was Tufton Wray, who married Sir James Montagu (son of Hon. George Montagu and grandson of the 1st Earl of Manchester), and was the mother of Charles Montagu, MP for Northampton, Camelford, St Germans, and for Westminster.

Through his son Edward, he was a grandfather of Sir Baptist Edward Wray, 8th Baronet, who died without issue in 1689.

Through his son Drury, he was a grandfather of Sir Christopher Wray, 10th Baronet and Sir Cecil Wray, 11th Baronet (whose heiress was his illegitimate daughter, Anne Casey, wife of Lord Vere Bertie).

Through his daughter Elizabeth, he was a grandfather of Albinia Eliot (1658–1717), who married George Courthope, son of George Courthope, MP for Sussex and East Grinstead, in 1684.

Through his son Cecil, he was a grandfather of William Wray (1663–1712), who married Isabella Ullithorne (parents of Sir John Wray, 12th Baronet and grandparents of Sir Cecil Wray, 13th Baronet).

Through his daughter Theodosia, he was a grandfather of John Laugharne, MP for Haverfordwest.

Parliament of England
Preceded by Sir John Wray; Richard Toothby	Member of Parliament for Grimsby; 1621–1625; With: Henry Pelham 1621–1625	Succeeded by Henry Pelham; William Skinner
Preceded by Henry Pelham; William Skinner	Member of Parliament for Grimsby; 1628–1629; With: Henry Pelham	Parliament suspended until 1640
Vacant Parliament suspended since 1629	Member of Parliament for Grimsby; 1640–1646; With: Sir Gervase Holles 1640–1642	Succeeded by Sir William Wray, Bt; Edward Rossiter
