= Drury Wray =

Sir Drury Wray, 9th Baronet (29 July 1633 – 30 October 1710) of Rathcannon Castle and Ballygaedy Casey, was an English aristocrat.

== Early life ==
Wray was born on 29 July 1633 in Lincolnshire. He was the third son of Sir Christopher Wray (1601–1646), and Albinia Cecil (1603–1703). Among his siblings were Sir William Wray, 1st Baronet, who was created a baronet in June 1660.

His paternal grandparents were Sir William Wray, 1st Baronet, of Glentworth of Ashby and Barlings, Lincolnshire, and, his second wife, Frances (née Drury), Lady Clifford, widow of Sir Nicholas Clifford of Bobbing, Kent, and daughter of Sir William Drury of Hawsted, Suffolk, and Elizabeth Stafford (the daughter of courtier Sir William Stafford). His maternal grandparents were Edward Cecil, 1st Viscount Wimbledon and Theodosia Noel (a daughter of Sir Andrew Noel).

== Career ==
In 1674 Wray obtained grants of land in the counties of Limerick and Tipperary, which he forfeited by his loyalty to James II, on whose side he fought at the Battle of the Boyne.

He served as High Sheriff of County Limerick in 1685.

He succeeded his nephew, Sir Baptist Edward Wray, as 9th baronet of Glentworth about 1689, having acquired by entail the Glentworth and other estates.

== Personal life ==
Wray was married to Anne Casey (d. 1697), a daughter of Thomas Casey of Rathcannon Castle and Ballygaedy Casey, County Limerick. Together, they were the parents of two sons, both of whom died without issue after succeeding to the baronetcy:

- Sir Christopher Wray, 10th Baronet (before 1672–1710), a soldier who died unmarried.
- Sir Cecil Wray, 11th Baronet (c. 1678–1736), the High Sheriff of Lincolnshire; he died unmarried but had a recognised illegitimate daughter, Anne Casey, who married Lord Vere Bertie.

Lady Wray died on 22 April 1697. Sir Drury died on 30 October 1710, and was succeeded in the baronetcy by his eldest son, Christopher. He died, unmarried, weeks later and the baronetcy passed to his second son, Cecil. Upon his death on 9 May 1736, the title and estates passed to Sir Drury Wray's grand-nephew, Sir John Wray, 12th Baronet, of Sleningford, Yorkshire (father of Sir Cecil Wray).

=== Descendants ===
Through his younger son Cecil, he was a grandfather of Anne Casey (b. c. 1726), who married Lord Vere Bertie, an MP for Boston who was the son of Robert Bertie, 1st Duke of Ancaster and Kesteven and, his second wife, Albinia Farington (nephew of Sir Edward Betenson, 1st Baronet), in 1736.

Baronetage of England
Preceded by Baptist Edward Wray	Baronet (of Glentworth) c.1689–1710	Succeeded by Christopher Wray
