= Richard de Camville =

English crusader knight

Richard de Camville (or Canville; died 1191) was an English crusader knight, and one of Richard the Lionheart's senior commanders during the Third Crusade. In June 1190, at Chinon, he was, with Robert IV of Sablé, Archbishop Gerard of Labarthe of Auch, Bishop Bernard II Lacarre of Bayonne put in charge of King Richard's fleet sailing for the Holy Land. He arrived in Lisbon in July together with Robert IV of Sablé where they were forced by King Sancho I of Portugal to bring a group of English Crusaders under control after they had been on rampage around the city. In 1191, he was appointed governor of Cyprus, jointly with Robert of Thornham. He died later in the same year at the Siege of Acre.

He was the son of Richard de Camville (died 1176), an Anglo-Norman landowner, and Millicent de Rethel (daughter of Gervais, Count of Rethel, and second cousin of Adeliza of Louvain, the second wife of King Henry I). His brother was Gerard.

The family probably originated from Canville-les-Deux-Églises (Canvilla 1149, Camvilla 1153) in Normandy. He had at least one daughter, Isabel, wife of Robert de Harcourt.

In England, his holdings included land at Stanton Harcourt, in Oxfordshire, Blackland, in Wiltshire, and Speen (possibly posthumously) and Avington, both in Berkshire.

== Family tree ==
Family tree
- Richard de Camville of Warwickshire (c. 1110 – bef. 1176) married Millicent de Rethel
  - Gerard (c. 1132 – 1214) married Nicholaa de la Haye
    - Richard (c. 1178 – 1226) married Eustacia Basset
      - Idonea (c. 1210 – 1252) married William II Longespee
  - Richard (c. 1135 – 1191) married Margaret
    - Isabel (c. 1153 – aft. 1212) married Robert de Harcourt
  - Maud (c. 1138) married William de Ros
  - William (c. 1142 – c.1208) married Albreda Marmion
    - Geoffrey (c. 1182) married Felicia
      - Felicia (c. 1220) married Philip Durvassal
  - Roger (c. 1145)
  - Walter (c. 1148)
    - Maud (c. 1173) married Thomas de Astley
