= Brattleby =

Village and civil parish in the West Lindsey district of Lincolnshire, England

Coordinates: 53.315920°N 0.577695°W

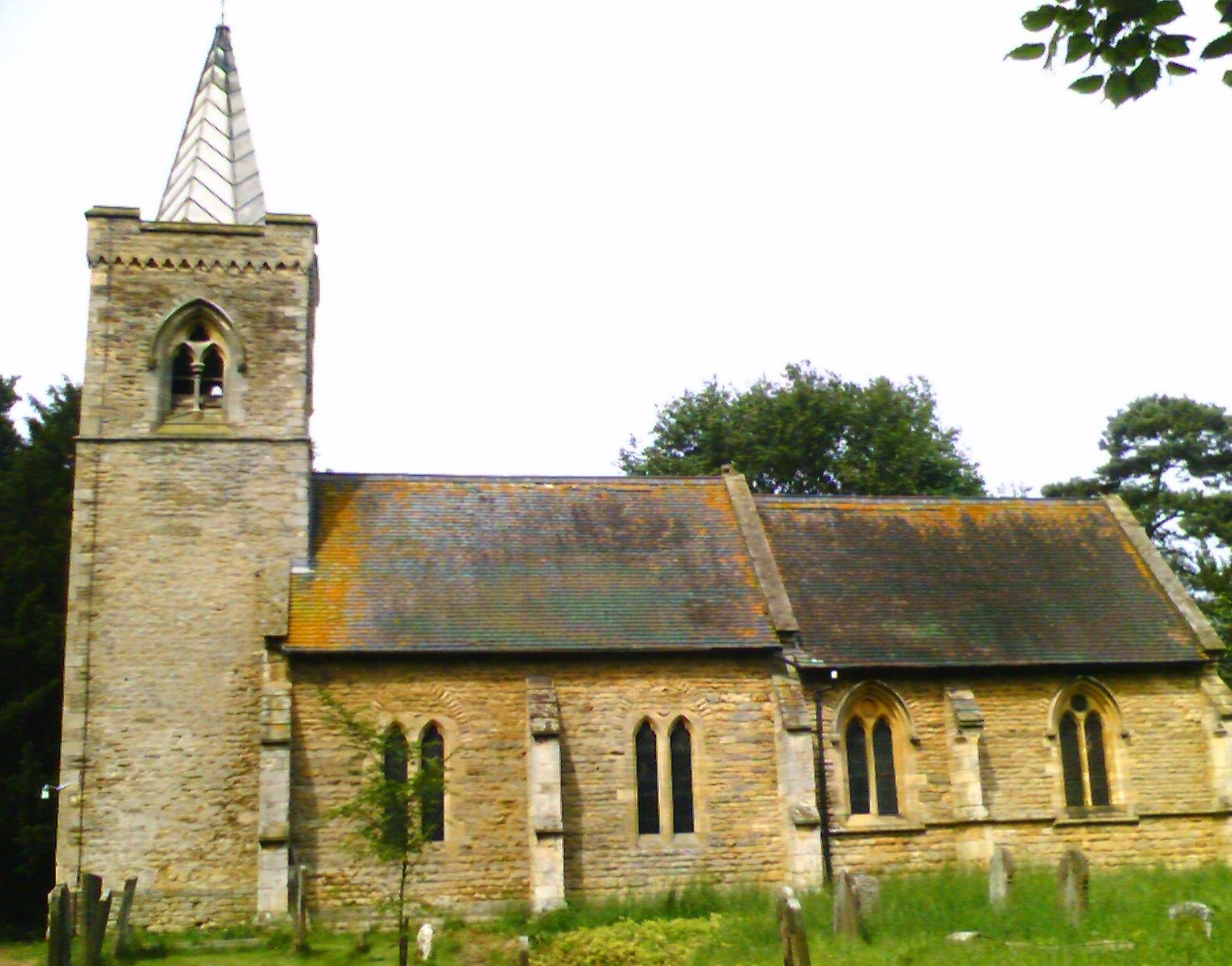
- St Cuthbert's Church, Brattleby

- Location within Lincolnshire
- Population: 111 (2011)
- OS grid reference: SK948808
  - London: 130 mi (210 km) SSE
- District: West Lindsey
- Shire county: Lincolnshire
- Region: East Midlands
- Country: England
- Sovereign state: United Kingdom
- Post town: Lincoln
- Postcode district: LN1
- Police: Lincolnshire
- Fire: Lincolnshire
- Ambulance: East Midlands
- UK Parliament: Gainsborough

Brattleby is a village and civil parish in the West Lindsey district of Lincolnshire, England. The population at the 2011 census was 111, a slight decrease from 113 in the 2001 census. It is 5 miles (8 km) north of Lincoln, west of the A15, and near to RAF Scampton.

In 1981, the village was designated a conservation area.

== History ==
According to A Dictionary of British Place Names, Brattleby is defined as "a farmstead or a village of a man called Brot-Ulfr", an Old Scandinavian person name, with 'by', a "farmstead, village or settlement".

In the Domesday Book of 1086, Brattleby is mentioned three times as "Brotulbi", in the Hundred of Lawress in the West Riding of Lindsey. The manor held 19.5 households, 2 smallholders 5 freemen, 3 ploughlands and a meadow of 8 acres (0.03 km^{2}). In 1066 Ulf Fenman was Lord of the manor, this transferred in 1086 to Gilbert of Ghent, who also became Tenant-in-chief.

Brattleby became a Barony after the Norman Conquest of 1066. In 1169 the Barony of Brattleby was inherited by Nicola de la Haye, who became Sheriff of Lincolnshire, and, in 1216 after the death of her husband Gerard de Canville, castellan of Lincoln Castle, where she was involved in the 1217 Battle of Lincoln and the defence against various sieges during the First Barons' War.

Brattleby Hall, established about 1780, with 1838-39 alterations by William Nicholson, was owned by the De La Haye family during the reign of Henry I. Pevsner describes the hall as early Victorian and notes stables dated 1813; the stable block is Grade II listed.

In 1885 Kelly's Directory recorded that the living at the discharged (incumbent untaxed for the first year of appointment) rectory was in the gift of Samuel W. Wright DL, JP, of Brattleby Hall, a "modern mansion", who was also principal landowner and lord of the manor. The chief crops within a parish area of 1,238 acres (5 km^{2}) were wheat, barley, turnips and clover. The parish population in 1881 was 148. There was a mixed parochial school for 40 pupils, built in 1871 and supported by Samuel Wright. Kelly's also noted three farmers, a wool merchant, farm bailiff, shopkeeper, blacksmith and a wheelwright.

Brattleby Grade II* listed Anglican church is dedicated to St. Cuthbert. It was established in the late 11th century with later additions in the 14th, and was heavily restored in 1858 by James Fowler. Nikolaus Pevsner notes a late Anglo-Saxon shaft of a cross at the south of the churchyard. Kellys described the church of St Cuthbert as:

a stone edifice in the Early English style rebuilt with the exception of the lower stage of the tower, and the arcade, in 1858, under the direction of Mr. James Fowler, of Louth: it consists of chancel, nave, north aisle and a western tower, surmounted by a small spire, containing 3 bells: there is a reredos of alabaster to the memory of the two elder sons of S W Wright Esq. of Brattleby Hall, also in the is chancel an ancient credence table. The east stained-glass window is in memory of Miss Mary Wright and another in the south side of the chancel is dedicated to Henrietta de Coetlogon. The register dates from the year 1686.

The churchyard contains one Commonwealth War Graves Commission grave, that of Flying Officer Clare Connor, RAF, the Canadian pilot of the aircraft on the mission for which John Hannah received the Victoria Cross. Connor was presented with the DFC by King George VI at Buckingham Palace when Hannah received the VC. Connor was based at nearby RAF Scampton, and he and his wife attended services at St. Cuthbert's. He was killed on a subsequent mission, and his body recovered from the North Sea.

== Notable people ==
- William Charles Salter, Rector
- Nicola de la Haie, Hereditary Constable of Lincoln Castle.
