= Charles Buck =

Charles Buck may refer to:

- Charles F. Buck (1841–1918), American politician
- Charles Buck (minister) (1771–1815), English theologian
- Sapiah (1840–1936), Ute leader who also used the name "Charles Buck"
- Charles Neville Buck (1879–1957), American writer
- Sir Charles Buck (c. 1692–1729), the third Baronet Buck
- Sir Charles Louis Buck (1722–1782), the fourth Baronet Buck
- Charles William Buck, American ambassador to Peru, father of Charles Neville Buck
- Rinker Buck (born 1950), author born "Charles Rinker Buck"

== See also ==
- The Charles Buck House, a historic building in Stoneham, Massachusetts
- The Charles Amos Buck House, a historic building in Stevensville, Montana
