= Leicestershire and Rutland Young Farmers =

Leicestershire and Rutland Young Farmers are part of the National organisation - National Federation of Young Farmers' Clubs (NFYFC) - aimed at young people in the rural community between the age of ten and twenty six.

== Functions ==
The organisation as a whole provides young people with a wealth of new experiences and opportunities. These include personal development and training opportunities that enable members to learn an array of new skills, take part in a varied competitions programme, get involved with the local community, have a voice on rural issues, travel abroad and enjoy a dynamic social life.

== Structure ==
The organisation’s membership comprises 22,000 young people from a variety of backgrounds, all of whom share an interest in the rural environment. As such, the NFYFC is the largest rural youth organisation of its kind in the UK. The NFYFC’s policies are decided by a National Council, which comprises 120 members and associate members, half of which are elected by the membership to represent their respective county federations.

Within Leicestershire and Rutland Young Farmers there are 11 of the 659 Young Farmers’ Clubs (YFCs) located throughout England and Wales:

- Ashby
- Charnwood
- Enderby
- Lutterworth
- Oakham
- Market Bosworth
- Melton Mowbray
- Netherseal
- Norton and Gaulby
- Rearsby
- Wymeswold

Leicestershire and Rutland Young Farmers in turn makes up one fifth of the East Midlands Area of Young Farmers (Derbyshire, Leicestershire, Lincolnshire, Nottinghamshire and Northamptonshire)

Leicestershire and Rutland YFCs current president is Michael Wells, who is supported by Andrew Woodward (the county development officer). The county chairman for 2013/2014 is Rob Kirk of Rearsby YFC who in turn is supported by Greig Farmer, of Market Bosworth YFC.

For information about local Leicestershire clubs contact the county office at Brooksby agricultural college on 01664 434532.
