= Richard Disney (politician) =

16th-century English politician

Richard Disney (by 1505 – 30 March 1578) was an English Member of Parliament.

He was born the son of William Disney of Norton Disney and succeeded his father in December 1540.

He was a member (MP) of the Parliament of England for Grantham in April 1554. He was a justice of the peace for Kesteven from 1547 to 1564 and served as High Sheriff of Lincolnshire for 1556–57 and 1566–67.

He had married twice: firstly Neile, the daughter and coheiress of Sir William Hussey of Beauvale, Nottinghamshire, with whom he had 7 sons and 5 daughters; and secondly Jane, the daughter of Sir William Askew of Nuthall, Nottinghamshire and widow of George St. Poll (d. 1558/59) of Snarford, Lincolnshire.
