= 1937 Kesteven County Council election =

1937 English local government election

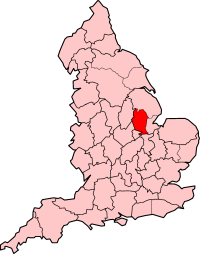
The administrative county of Kesteven (1889–1974), shown within England.

Elections to Kesteven County Council were held on Saturday, 6 March 1937. Kesteven was one of three divisions of the historic county of Lincolnshire in England; it consisted of the ancient wapentakes (or hundreds) of Aswardhurn, Aveland, Beltisloe, Boothby Graffoe, Flaxwell, Langoe, Loveden, Ness, and Winnibriggs and Threo. The Local Government Act 1888 established Kesteven as an administrative county, governed by a Council; elections were held every three years from 1889, until it was abolished by the Local Government Act 1972, which established Lincolnshire County Council in its place.

For the 1937 elections, there were contests in 8 divisions: Ancaster, Billingborough, Bracebridge, Caythorpe, Claypole, Grantham no. 3, Rippingale, and Thurlby. In all of the other divisions, only one candidate was nominated and they were returned unopposed.

== Results by division ==
Division	Candidate	Party	Votes	Retiring member
Ancaster	Herbert Jones		395	y
Ancaster	Charles Scoffield		180	n
Bassingham	Henry Collin			y
Bennington	George Edmund Denton			y
Billingborough	Arthur Wilson		283	n
Billingborough	George Sandall		195	n
Billingborough	Fred Smith		155	n
Billinghay	William Skinner			y
Bourne no. 1	Robert Arnold Collins		y	
Bourne no. 2	Frederick George Wall			y
Bracebridge	John Coalton Hall		332	n
Bracebridge	George Baumber		247	y
Branston	Roland Ellis Dean			y
Bytham	John Turner			y
Caythorpe	Henry William Newman Fane		282	n
Caythorpe	Thomas Reynolds		245	y
Claypole	John William Milner		328	y
Claypole	Rev. Thomas Billingham		181	n
Colsterworth	James Duke Hind			y
Corby	Harry Adcock			n
Cranwell	Rev. Alfred Richings Tucker			n
Deeping St James	Charles Henry Feneley			y
Dunston	Henry Gordon Dean			y
Gonerby and Barrowby	William Horace Brownlow			y
Grantham no. 1	Fred P. Digby			y
Grantham no. 2	Mrs Lilian Basford			y
Grantham no. 3	Mrs D. Schwind		381	y
Grantham no. 3	Mrs S. A. Barnes	Lab	357	n
Grantham no. 4	H. H. Quilter			y
Grantham no. 5	Gordon Foster			y
Grantham no. 6	Mervyn E. Osborn			y
Grantham no. 7	F. W. Topham			y
Grantham no. 8	E. K. Marsland			y
Grantham no. 9	S. T. Roberts			y
Grantham no. 10	E. S. Dunkerton			n
Heckington	George Henry Goose			y
Helpringham	Major William Gilliatt Cragg			y
Kyme	Morris Tonge Chambers			y
Leadenham	Lieutenant-Commander John Cracroft-Amcotts			n
Market Deeping	Charles William Barrand			y
Martin	Henry Wright			n
Metheringham	George Flintham			y
Morton	Herbert Charles Tointon			n
Navenby	John William Raby			y
North Hykeham	George William Hackney			y
Osbournby	George Harold Schwind			n
Ponton	Christopher Hatton Turnor			y
Rippingale	Alfred Everett		397	y
Rippingale	Rev. John Smithson Barstow (Vicar of Aslackby)		173	n
Ropsley	Rev. Cecil St John Wright			y
Ruskington	Edward Cuthbert Allington James			y
Scopwick	Herbert Gibson			y
Skellingthorpe	Richard Hatton Brooks			n
Sleaford no. 1	Henry Hine Foster			y
Sleaford no. 2	Herbert Hutchinson Brown			y
Sleaford no. 3	John William Pattinson			y
Stamford no. 1	Henry Deer			y
Stamford no. 2	Walter Ernest Dodman			y
Stamford no. 3	James Siddall Prior			y
Stamford no. 4	Fred Sindall			y
Stamford no. 5	Ernest Ireson			y
Swinderby	Admiral Robert Cathcart Kemble Lambert			y
Thurlby	Thomas Goodwin Holmes		490	y
Thurlby	Archibald Ward Sharman		263	n
Uffington	Colonel Froude Dillon Trollope-Bellew			y
Washingborough	Frederick Higgs			y
Welby	Philip Henry Selby			y
Wilsford	Rodolph Ladeveze Adlercron			y
Woolsthorpe	Oliver Charles Earle Welby			y

Sources:

- "Kesteven County Council: Contests in 8 Divisions". Sleaford Gazette. 26 February 1937. p. 3.
- "Our County Parliaments". Stamford Mercury. 26 February 1937. p. 24.
- "County Council Contests". Grantham Journal. 27 February 1937. p. 11.
- "County Council elections". Grantham Journal. 13 March 1937. p. 6.

== By-elections ==
=== April 1937 ===
Following the death of H. H. Foster, a Holdingham resident and county councillor for the Sleaford no. 1 division, W. Middleton was returned unopposed for his seat on the county council.

=== May 1937 ===
The county councillor for North Hykeham, George William Hackney, died in March 1937 after being kicked by a horse. This prompted a contest to fill the vacancy between George William Hutson, of Hilldersden House, and John Willam Clarke, a former police officer, of Park View, Newark Road. Hutson won with 342 votes against Clarke's 301 (there were 3 spoilt papers).
