= Wray baronets =

Extinct baronetcy in the Baronetage of England

There have been two Wray Baronetcies, both created in the Baronetage of England. The first was created on 25 November 1611 for William Wray of Glentworth, Lincolnshire, and became extinct upon the death of the 15th Baronet in 1809. The second was created on 27 June 1660 for William Wray of Ashby, Lincolnshire. He was the grandson of the 1st Baronet of Glentworth, and his son, Christopher Wray, inherited the 1660 baronetcy in 1669 and the 1611 baronetcy, as the 6th Baronet, in 1672. The 1660 creation became extinct upon the death of Sir William Wray, 7th Baronet of Glentworth and 2nd Baronet of Ashby, in about 1687.

== Wray of Glentworth, Lincolnshire (1611) ==
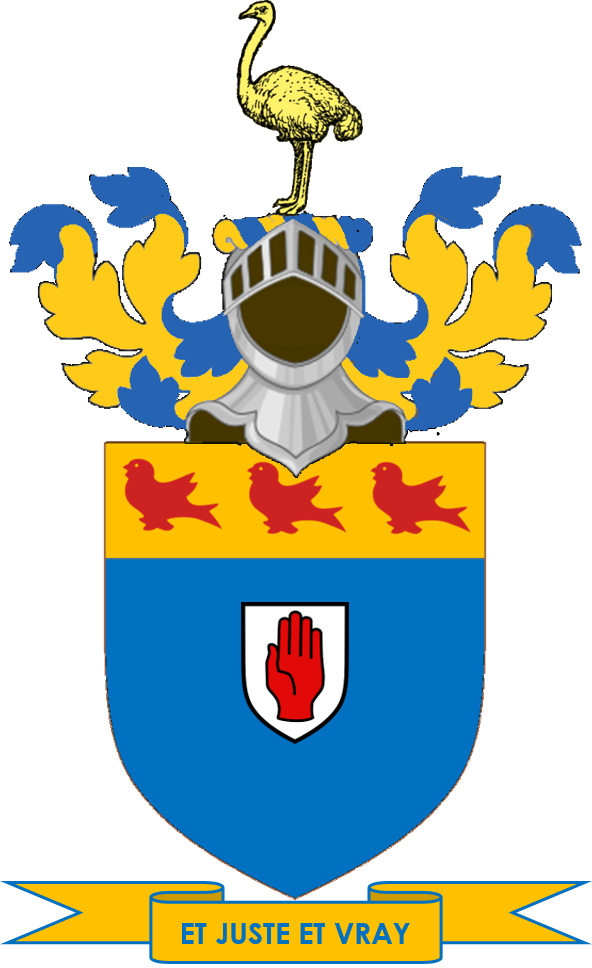
Arms: Azure on a Chief Or three Martlets Gules; Crest: An Ostrich Or; Motto: Et Juste et Vray

- Sir William Wray, 1st Baronet (c. 1555 – 13 August 1617)
- Sir John Wray, 2nd Baronet (27 November 1586 – 31 December 1655)
- Sir John Wray, 3rd Baronet (21 September 1619 – 29 October 1664)
- Sir Christopher Wray, 4th Baronet (29 March 1621 – 25 November 1664)
- Sir Bethell Wray, 5th Baronet (30 January 1633 – 19 February 1672)
- Sir Christopher Wray, 6th Baronet (10 February 1652 – 31 August 1679) (succeeded as 2nd Baronet of the 1660 creation in 1669)
- Sir William Wray, 7th Baronet (died c. 1687) (1660 creation extinct on his death)
- Sir Baptist Edward Wray, 8th Baronet (died c. 1689)
- Sir Drury Wray, 9th Baronet (29 July 1633 – 30 October 1710)
- Sir Christopher Wray, 10th Baronet (before 1672 – 21 November 1710)
- Sir Cecil Wray, 11th Baronet (c. 1678 – 9 May 1736), High Sheriff of Lincolnshire, 1715
- Sir John Wray, 12th Baronet (24 October 1689 – 26 January 1752)
- Sir Cecil Wray, 13th Baronet (3 September 1734 – 10 January 1805)
- Sir William Ullithorne Wray, 14th Baronet (August 1721 – 9 August 1808)
- Sir William James Wray, 15th Baronet (c. 1771 – 27 August 1809)

== Wray of Ashby, Lincolnshire (1660) ==
- Sir William Wray, 1st Baronet (c. 1626 – 17 October 1669)
- Sir Christopher Wray, 2nd and 6th Baronet (10 February 1652 – 31 August 1679)
- Sir William Wray, 3rd and 7th Baronet (died c.1687)

== See also ==
- Wrey baronets

Baronetage of England
Preceded by Ayloffe baronets	Wray baronets 25 November 1611	Succeeded by Essex baronets
