= Laugharne (surname) =

Laugharne is a surname. Notable people with the surname include:

- Rowland Laugharne (c. 1607 – 1675), Welsh soldier

- John Laugharne (c. 1665 – 1715), Welsh politician, grandson of Rowland Laugharne
