= Henry Pelham (speaker) =

English lawyer and politician (fl. 1640s)

Henry Pelham (fl. 1640s) was an English lawyer and politician who sat in the House of Commons between 1621 and 1648. He was Speaker of the English House of Commons for a short time in 1647.

Pelham was the son of Sir William Pelham, of Brocklesby, Lincolnshire. He matriculated at Trinity College, Cambridge at Easter 1615 and was admitted at Gray's Inn on 6 November 1616.

Pelham was elected Member of Parliament for Grimsby in 1621 and was re-elected in 1625, 1626 and 1628. He sat until 1629, when King Charles decided to rule without parliament for eleven years.

In April 1640, Pelham was elected MP for Grantham in the Short Parliament. He was re-elected MP for Grantham for the Long Parliament in November 1640. He was Grand Chamberlain from 1640 to 1648. He held the post of Speaker for a short time in 1647, when William Lenthall temporarily fled from London.

Pelham was Recorder of Lincoln until his resignation in 1658.

Parliament of England
Preceded by Sir Christopher Wray; Sir John Wray	Member of Parliament for Great Grimsby; 1621–1629; With: Sir Christopher Wray 1621–1625; William Skinner 1626; Sir Christopher Wray 1628–1629	Parliament suspended until 1640
Vacant Parliament suspended since 1629	Member of Parliament for Grantham; 1640–1648; With: Sir Edward Bashe 1640; Thomas Hussey 1640–1641; Sir William Airmine 1642–1648	Succeeded by Sir William Airmine
Political offices
Preceded by William Lenthall	Speaker of the House of Commons; 1647	Succeeded by William Lenthall
