= Nicola de la Haie =

Sheriff of Lincolnshire

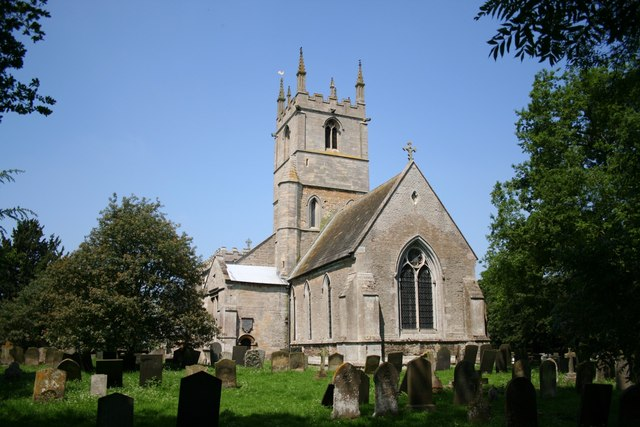
St Michael's Church, Swaton

Nicola de la Haie (born c. 1150; d. 1230), of Swaton in Lincolnshire, (also written de la Haye) was an English landowner and administrator who inherited from her father not only lands in both England and Normandy but also the post of hereditary constable of Lincoln Castle. On her own, she twice defended the castle against prolonged sieges. After the death of her second husband in 1214, she continued to hold the castle until she retired on grounds of old age in 1226.

On 18 October 1216, Nicola was also appointed sheriff of Lincolnshire by King John.

== Life ==
Born about 1150, Nicola was one of three daughters and coheiresses of Richard de la Haie, a major Lincolnshire landowner whose family had founded the Premonstratensian house of Barlings Priory in Lincolnshire, and his wife Matilda, daughter of William Vernon. Her paternal grandfather Robert de la Haie, of Halnaker in Sussex, had in 1115 been granted the posts of hereditary constable of Lincoln Castle and hereditary sheriff of Lincolnshire. When her father died in 1169 she inherited the post of constable, which in practice was filled by her two husbands in succession.

When King Henry II died in 1189, Nicola and her second husband Gerard de Camville travelled to Barfleur in Normandy to obtain a charter confirming her rights from the new king Richard I. Richard then went off to the Holy Land on the Third Crusade, leaving authority in England in the hands of William de Longchamp. In 1191 Longchamp removed Camville from the shrievalty and the castellancy, ordering him to hand over the castle.

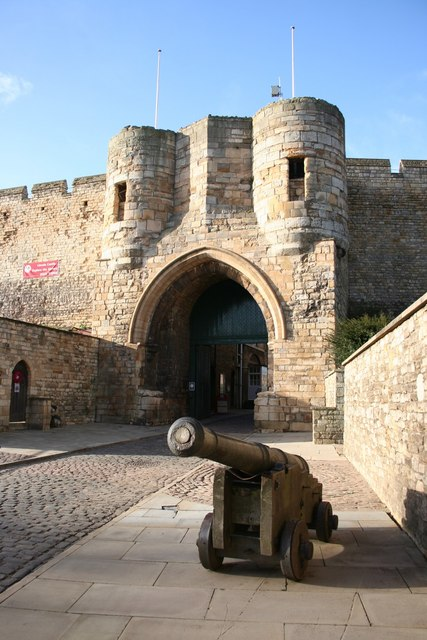
Lincoln Castle, East Gate

When this was refused, Longchamp ordered an armed assault on the castle. While Camville stayed with Prince John at Nottingham, Nicola held out against a month-long siege by a force of 30 knights, 20 mounted men-at-arms and 300 infantry, together with 40 sappers who attacked the walls of the castle. Having failed to take the castle, Longchamp reached a compromise with Camville and restored him to his two posts, but then had him excommunicated. When King Richard returned from crusade and captivity in 1194, he removed Camville from both posts.

Things improved when King Richard was succeeded by his brother John. Though a difficult man who fell out with most people, both Nicola and her husband remained loyal to him and were fortunate in maintaining a cordial relationship. In 1199 he restored the castle and the shrievalty to Camville, who held them until he died shortly before January 1215. Nicola then held both posts and, when John came to Lincoln in 1216, she is reported to have gone out to meet him with the keys of the castle in her hand, saying that as she was now a very old widow she was unable to continue in office any longer. He replied: “My dear Nicola, I want you to hold on to the castle as you have so far, until I decide otherwise.” He also confirmed her right to the shrievalty. Philip Mark, also sheriff of Nottingham, was co-sheriff.

Lincoln Castle then came under attack by the rebels against John, led by the French prince Louis. While besieged there, Nicola was visited by Peter des Roches, the influential bishop of Winchester, who knew a secret way in and assured her that loyal forces would soon attack the besiegers. Her sturdy defence kept the castle intact until May 1217, when the Second Battle of Lincoln resulted in the defeat of the rebels and their French allies.

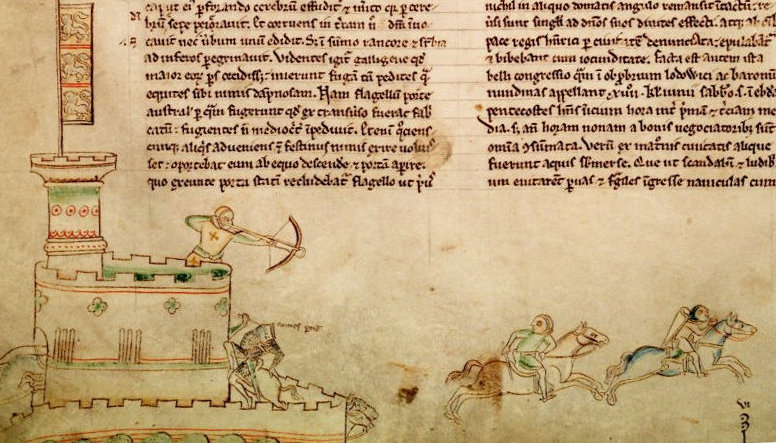
The defence of Lincoln Castle in 1217

Nicola then had to face a new threat, this time from William II Longespée, son of the Earl of Salisbury and husband of her granddaughter Idonea, who tried to evict her. He was required to return both the castle and the role of sheriff to her, but she later lost the sheriffdom.

In 1226, when Nicola must have been over 70 years old, she retired from the castle to her estate at Swaton, where she died on 20 November 1230.

== Landholdings ==
At her death, in addition to Swaton, Nicola held lands at Ashby, Billingborough, Bullington, Dembleby, Faldingworth, Fillingham, Horbling, Hogsthorpe, Ingham, Ingleby, Kirkby Underwood, Marston, Newton, Pickworth, Riseholme, Scawby, Spanby, and Willoughby.

== Family ==
Nicola's first husband was William fitz Erneis, who died before 1185. By then, she was married to Gerard de Camville, who died shortly before January 1215. Her children included:

Richard, who died soon after February 1217,
Matilda, alive in 1194.
Nicola, married Oliver Deincourt,

Honorary titles
Preceded by unknown	Sheriff of Lincolnshire; 1216; With: Philip Marc	Succeeded by unknown
