= William Tyrwhitt (MP, died 1522) =

English courtier and Member of Parliament

Sir William Tyrwhitt (by 1458 – 10 April 1522), of Kettleby, Lincolnshire was an English courtier and Member of Parliament.

== Early life ==
He was born the eldest son of Sir Robert Tyrwhitt of Kettleby and succeeded his father in 1457/58.

== Career ==
He was appointed an Esquire of the body by 1482 and knighted in 1487 for his bravery at the Battle of Stoke Field and elevated to knight banneret after the Battle of Blackheath.

He was High Sheriff of Lincolnshire for 1481-82, 1494–95, 1500–01 and 1517–18 and knight of the shire in the English House of Commons for Lincolnshire in 1491. He was probably the Member of Parliament for Grimsby in 1510.

In 1512 he served as a captain under Sir William Sandys in the French campaign and in 1520 accompanied Henry VIII and his entourage of peers and knights to the meeting with Francis I of France at the Field of the Cloth of Gold.

== Death ==
He died in 1522 and was buried in Lincoln Cathedral. He had married by 1476, Agnes or Anne, the daughter of Sir Robert Constable of Somerby, Lincolnshire and Flamborough in Yorkshire by his wife Agnes, the daughter of Roger Wentworth and Margery le Despenser, and left 2 sons and 3 daughters. He was succeeded by his eldest son Sir Robert Tyrwhitt, Vice-Admiral of England. Their daughter Agnes married Thomas Burgh, 1st Baron Burgh, K.G.

Parliament of England
Preceded by	Member of Parliament for Grimsby; 1510	Succeeded by
