= Sir William Essex, 1st Baronet =

Member of the Parliament of England

Sir William Essex, 1st Baronet (c. 1575 – c. 1645), was an English politician who sat in the House of Commons between 1597 and 1601.

Essex was the son of Thomas Essex, of Bewcot, Berkshire, by Joan Harrison, daughter of Thomas Harrison. He was a student of Christ Church, Oxford in 1587. In 1597 he was elected Member of Parliament for Arundel. He was elected MP for Stafford in 1601. He was a J.P. for Berkshire from 1601. In 1611 he was created a baronet, of Bewcot in the County of Berkshire. He managed to squander his substantial inheritance. During the Civil War he was in command of a parliamentary company of foot in a regiment commanded by his son, Charles Essex. Sir William was taken prisoner at the Battle of Edgehill in 1642 while his son was killed in action.

Essex died probably in 1645 and the baronetcy became extinct.

Essex married Jane Harcourt, daughter of Sir Walter Harcourt, of Stanton Harcourt, Oxfordshire in 1593, having obtained a licence by trickery while he was still in wardship.

Baronetage of England
New creation	Baronet (of Bewcot); 1611–c. 1645	Extinct
Baronetage of England
Preceded by Wray baronets	Essex baronets 25 November 1611	Succeeded by Saunderson baronets
