= William Twigge =

Anglican priest (1657–1727)

William Twigge (1657 – 1727) was an Irish Anglican priest.

Ladyman was born in Carrickfergus and educated at Trinity College Dublin. He was a prebendary of Limerick Cathedral from 1695 to 1705. In 1699, he became Chancellor of Killaloe and in 1705 Archdeacon of Limerick holding both positions until his death.

Church of Ireland titles
Preceded by James Bland	Archdeacon of Limerick; 1705–1727	Succeeded by Robert Cashin
