= Edward Bashe =

English politician

Sir Edward Bashe (died 12 May 1653) was an English politician who sat in the House of Commons between 1628 and 1640.

== Life ==
Bashe was the son of Ralph Bashe, of Stanstead Abbots, Hertfordshire and his wife Frances Carey, daughter of Sir Edward Carey, Master of the Jewel Office. He matriculated at Peterhouse, Cambridge in Autumn 1608. He received a knighthood at Theobalds on 6 June 1616.

In 1625 he obtained the post of Chamberlain of the Exchequer for life.

Bashe was elected Member of Parliament for Stamford in 1628 and sat until 1629 when King Charles decided to rule without parliament for eleven years. In April 1640, he was elected MP for Grantham in the Short Parliament.

Bashe lived at Stanstead Abbots which had previously belonged to Anne Boleyn and which was granted to Bashe's grandfather Edward Baeshe in 1559. Bashe married Mary Montagu, daughter of Sir Charles Montagu.

== Death ==
Bashe died in 1653 and was buried at Stanstead Cussans, Hertfordshire. By deed of 10 November 1635 and under his will he founded charities to support almshouses and a school at Stanstead. He had no children and his property went to a cousin Ralph Bashe. At the Restoration in 1660, Ralph unsuccessfully petitioned King Charles II to inherit the office of Chamberlain.

Parliament of England
Preceded by Montagu Bertie; Brian Palmes	Member of Parliament for Stamford; 1628–1629; With: Sir Thomas Hatton, 1st Baronet	Parliament suspended until 1640
Vacant Parliament suspended since 1629	Member of Parliament for Grantham; 1640; With: Henry Pelham	Succeeded by Henry Pelham; Thomas Hussey
