= Girsby, Lincolnshire =

Hamlet in the East Lindsey district of Lincolnshire, England

Coordinates: 53.367532°N 0.171066°W

Girsby
- Location within Lincolnshire
- OS grid reference: TF217871
  - London: 135 mi (217 km) S
- Civil parish: Burgh on Bain
- District: East Lindsey
- Shire county: Lincolnshire
- Region: East Midlands
- Country: England
- Sovereign state: United Kingdom
- Post town: Market Rasen
- Postcode district: LN8
- Police: Lincolnshire
- Fire: Lincolnshire
- Ambulance: East Midlands
- UK Parliament: Louth and Horncastle

Girsby is a hamlet in the East Lindsey district of Lincolnshire, England. It is situated less than 1 mile (2 km) north from the A157 road, 7 miles (11 km) west from Louth and 7 miles east from Market Rasen. It lies in the civil parish of Burgh on Bain.

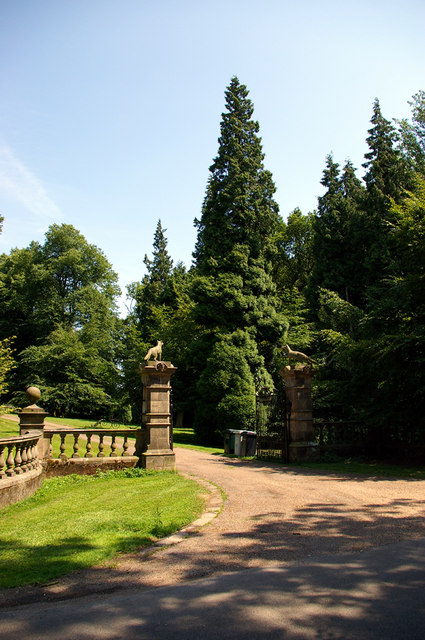
Girsby Manor gateway

In the 1086 Domesday Book Girsby is written as "Grisebi", in the South Riding of Lindsey and the Hundred of Wraggoe. The manor comprised 34.5 households, 8 villagers, 7 smallholders, and 18 freemen, with 4.5 ploughlands and a meadow of 20 acres (0.08 km^{2}). In 1066 Almer was Lord of the manor, this being transferred in 1086 to William of Verly, with Thomas of Bayeux, archbishop of St Peter's, York, as tenant-in-chief

At the west of Girsby is evidence of a deserted medieval village, with earthworks, hollow ways, ridge and furrow field systems and tofts (homesteads with land).

In 1885 Kelly's Directory noted Girsby Manor and its former owners, the Pisdar and Lister families. By 1885 Lords of the Manor and owners of the whole parish of Burgh on Bain were the trustees of the estate of the late Captain John Wilson Fox JP, the previous resident of Girsby Manor who died in 1882. The Manor was later owned by Captain Fox's son, John St. Vigor Fox, who became High Sheriff of Lincolnshire in 1906. Girsby Manor was demolished in the mid-20th century, but the building's Grade II listed 1905 or 1909 Baroque-style entrance, with sculpted foxes set on gateway pillars, remains.
