= Leadenham House =

Country house in Lincolnshire, England

Coordinates: 53.0552°N 0.5850°W

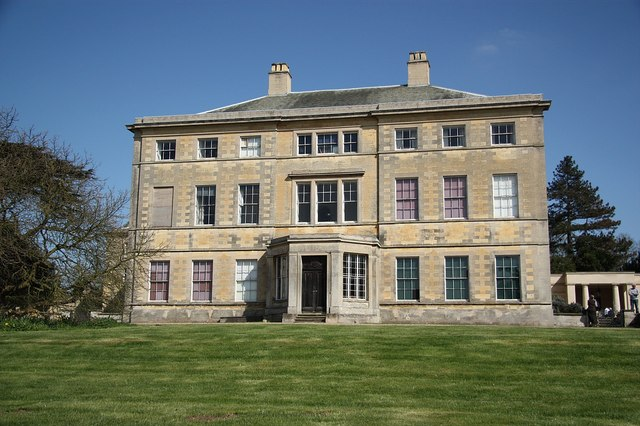
Leadenham House

Leadenham House is a Grade II* listed Georgian country house located in Leadenham, Lincolnshire, England.

The house is constructed in '2½ storeys', (Note: The description '2½ storey' is taken from the listing, and in turn from the article in Country Life. As can be seen in the photograph, the 3rd floor does not have large windows or grand high ceilings, and is intended for service staff and storage. This is sometimes called '2½ storey'.) featuring ashlar and dressed limestone rubble with ashlar dressings, and a slate hipped roof with a seven-bay frontage to the west. The north and south elevations, each featuring four bays, are identical.

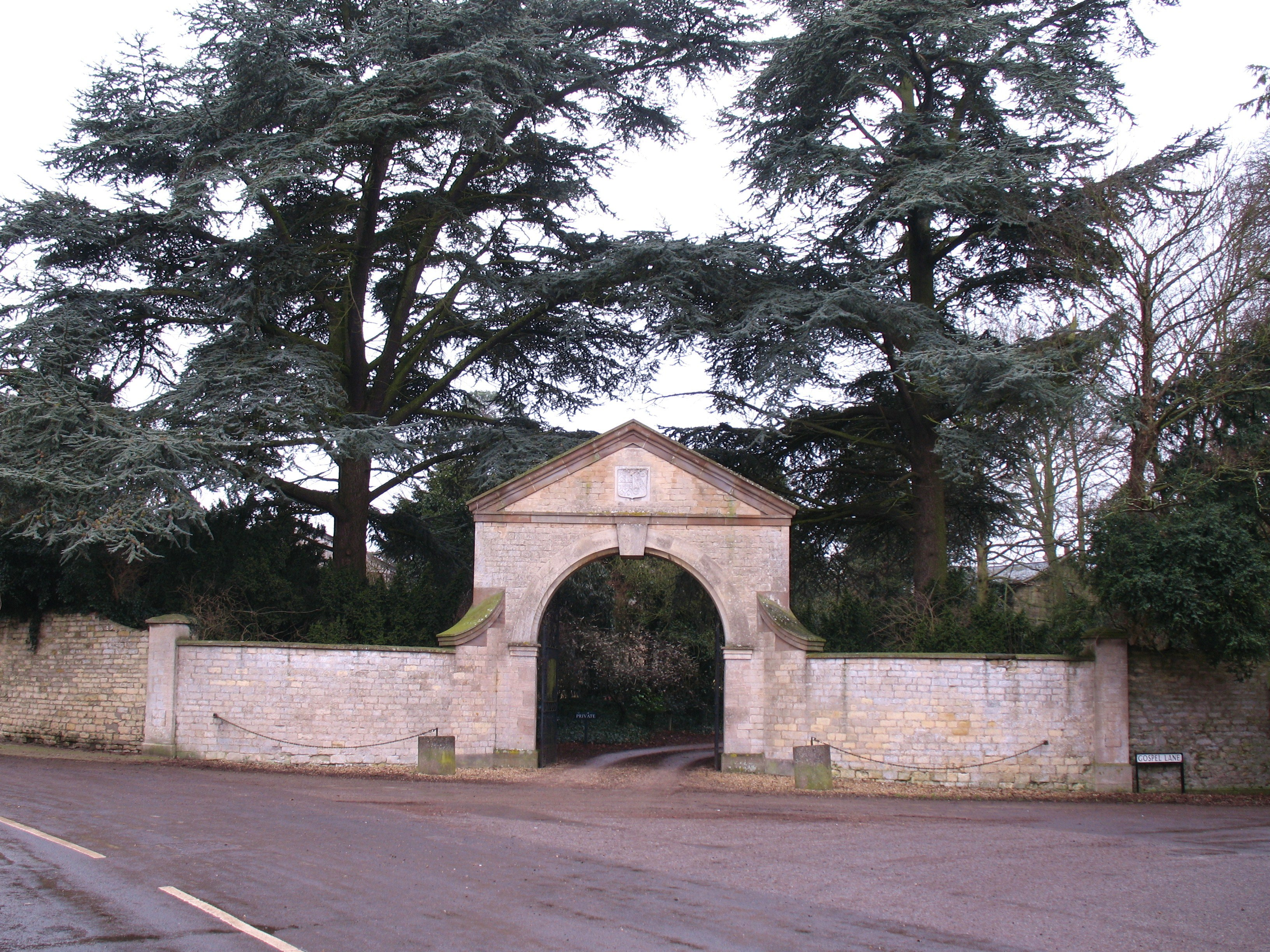
The Gate

The house stands within parkland surrounded by 3,000 acres (1,200 hectares) of farmland. The gateway, constructed of similar ashlar, is also a listed building.

== History ==
The hall was built between 1790 and 1796 for William Reeve by Christopher Staveley of Melton Mowbray. It was extended by architect Lewis Vulliamy in 1826–29 and altered by architect Detmar Blow in 1903. Blow also hung two of the reception rooms with hand-painted oriental wallpapers.

It descended in the Reeve family to Lt-Col William Reeve (1906–1993) who was High Sheriff of Lincolnshire for 1957. Following the 2013 divorce of Peter Richard Reeve (1947–2024) and his former wife Henrietta, the value of the estate was divided between the former spouses. This division was contested unsuccessfully by their elder son William, who sought to preserve the estate's integrity.
