= John Laugharne =

British politician (died 1715)

John Laugharne (c. 1665 – 15 February 1715) was a British politician who served as a Member of Parliament for Haverfordwest from 1702 in the Parliament of England and then in the Parliament of Great Britain from 1707 to his death. A Tory, he served as mayor of Pembroke from 1701 to 1702, and sheriff of Haverfordwest from 1704 to 1705.

== Early life and education ==
Laugharne was the first and only surviving son of Rowland Laugharne (died c. 1698), the son of Rowland Laugharne and Theodosia, the daughter of Sir Christopher Wray. He was matriculated at Jesus College, Oxford on 15 February 1682 at the age of 16. He earned a BA in 1685. On 26 December 1698 he married Anne (died 1715), the daughter of Lewis Wogan.

== Parliamentary career ==
In December 1701, Laugharne supported the Tory Sir Thomas Powell, 1st Baronet in the Carmarthenshire election. A committed Anglican, he was active in religious societies such as the Society for Promoting Christian Knowledge and the Society for the Propagation of the Gospel, he was influenced by fellow MP, Sir John Philipps.

Laugharne was returned unopposed to Haverfordwest in the 1702 election. On 28 November 1704, he did not support the Tory "Tack", leading him to be labelled as "Low Church" in 1705. On 25 October 1705, he voted for the Court candidate, John Smith as speaker.

In 1710, Laugharne voted against the impeachment of Dr Henry Sacheverell. In 1710 till 1711, he appeared in the "white lists" of Tories who opposed continuing the War of Spanish Succession and exposed mismanagement by the previous ministry. In March 1711, he helped defend Bishop William Nicolson from criticism over interference in the Carlisle election.

On 20 May 1713, Laugharne introduced a private naturalization bill in Parliament.

Laugharne died suddenly on 15 February 1715, the night after winning reelection. His estate was shared among three co-heiresses, probably his sisters. His widow died a few months later.
