= Gerard de Canville =

Anglo-Norman landowner and administrator

Gerard de Camville (died 1214), was an Anglo-Norman landowner and administrator who was a loyal supporter of King Henry II of England and of his son King John, and through his wife obtained the posts of sheriff of Lincolnshire and constable of Lincoln Castle.

== Origins ==
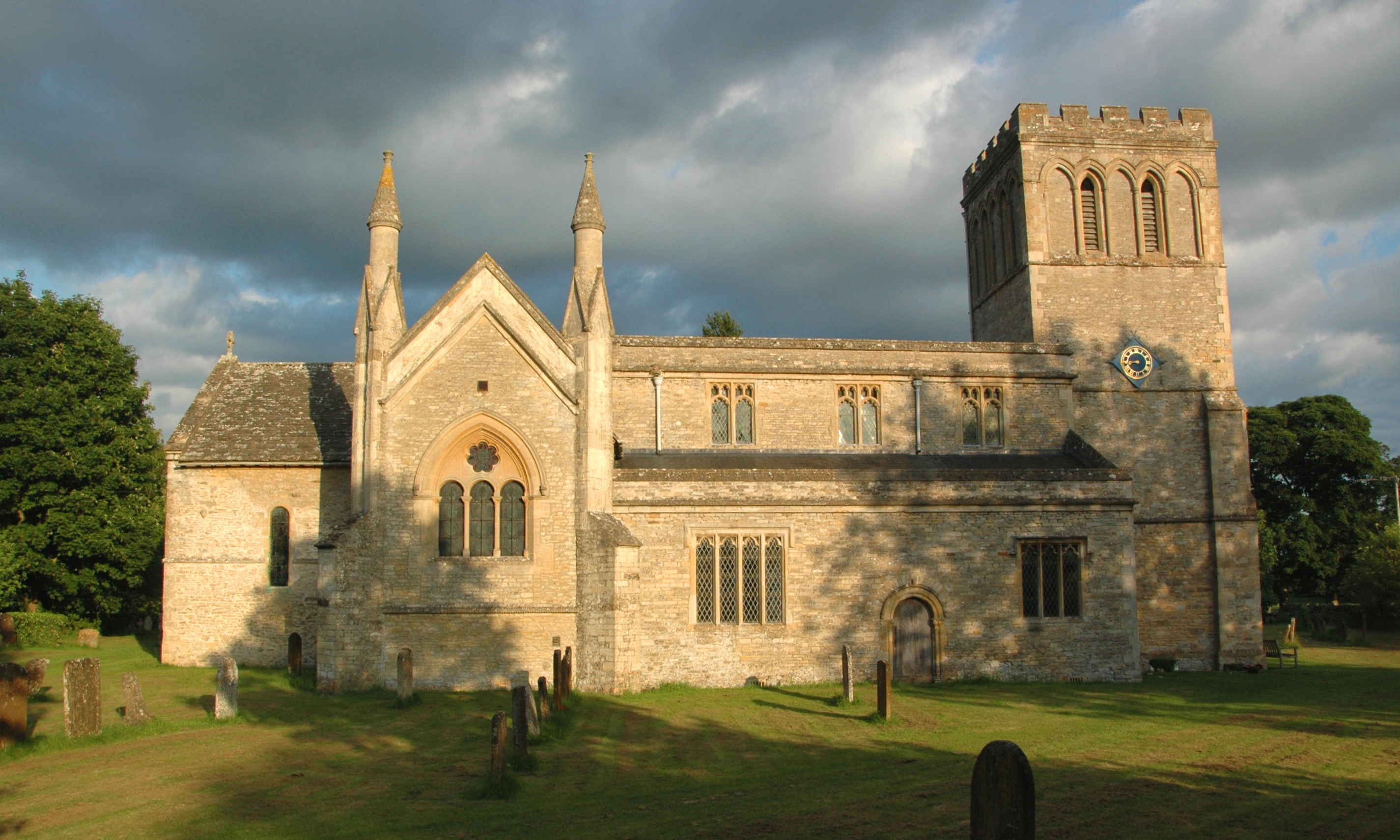
All Saints’ Church, Middleton Stoney

His family came from Canville-les-Deux-Églises near Dieppe, an important place in medieval times but now a small farming village. Born before 1153, he was the son of Richard de Canville, lord of the manor of Middleton Stoney in Oxfordshire where he had a castle, and his first wife Alice. His father was a loyal supporter of King Stephen of England, and of his successor Henry II, until his death in 1176 when most of his lands passed to his son.

== Career ==
Already from 1174 a close associate of the king, by 1185 he had married a widowed heiress, Nicola de la Haie, and as her husband held not only her lands in England and Normandy but also her hereditary offices of sheriff of Lincolnshire and constable of Lincoln Castle. After the death of Henry II in 1189, these two posts were confirmed to him and Nicola by the new king Richard I.

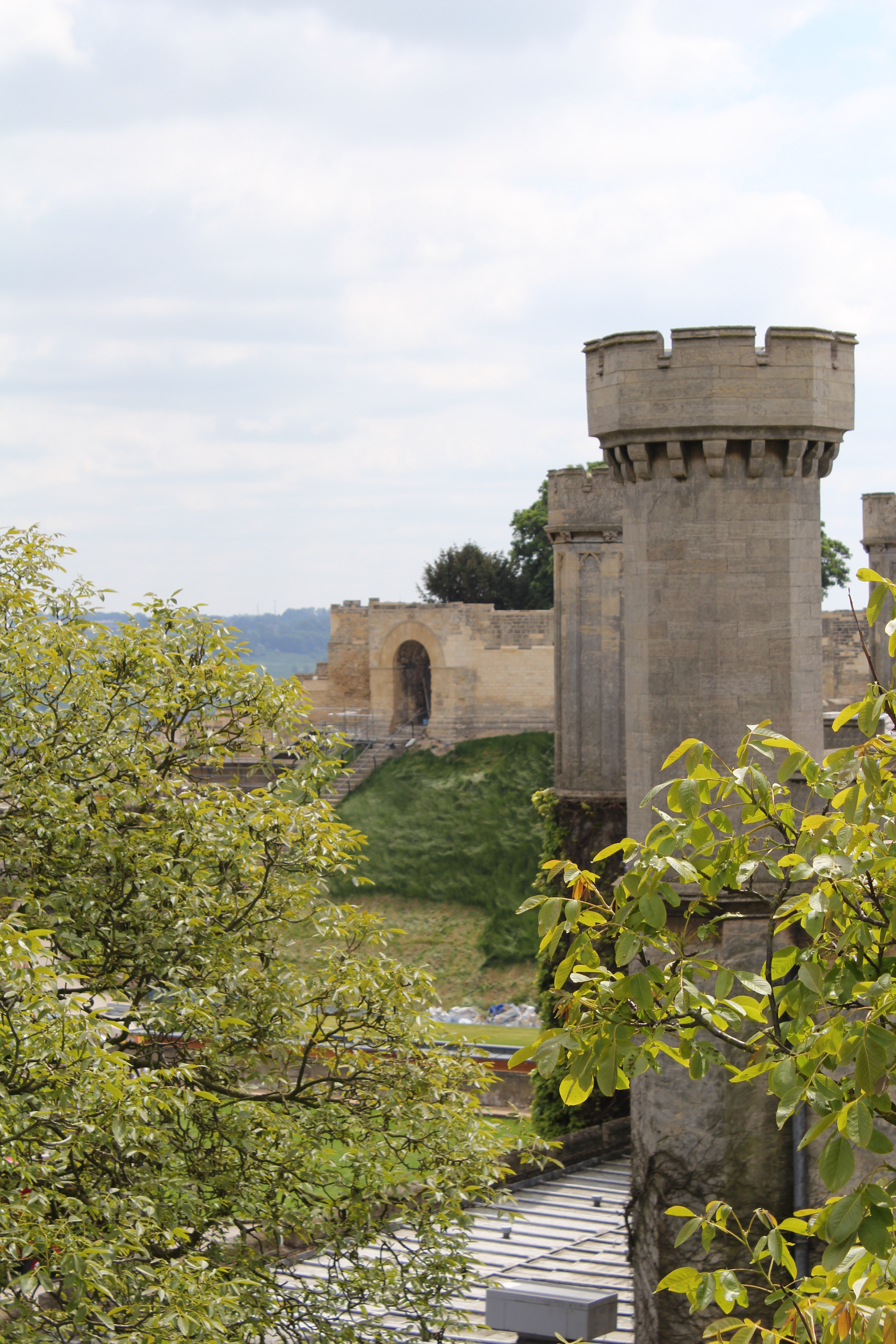
Lincoln Castle

While Richard was overseas on the Third Crusade, in 1191 he transferred his loyalty to Richard”s younger brother and potential heir, Prince John. The Lord Chancellor of England, William de Longchamp, promptly stripped him of the shrievalty and ordered him to surrender Lincoln Castle. When this was refused, Longchamp ordered troops to seize the castle, but they were thwarted by Nicola, who they then besieged. In retaliation, Canville and John attacked and took the two royal castles of Nottingham and Tickhill (on Nottingham's border with Yorkshire), upon which Longchamp agreed a settlement and restored Canville as sheriff. In revenge, Longchamp arranged Canville's excommunication. In compensation, John appointed Canville as keeper of the honour of Wallingford and benefited from Canville's support during the rebellion of 1193.

On returning to England in 1194, Richard stripped Canville of his offices and lands. Though he was able to buy back the right to his estates, but not his posts, he then faced legal charges brought by Longchamp over sheltering criminals and participating in John's illegal seizure of the castles of Nottingham and Tickhill. When John became king on Richard's death in 1199, he restored Canville to his posts, making him sheriff of Lincolnshire (which he held until 1205) and castellan of Lincoln. The rest of his public life was spent in local administration in Lincolnshire.

He died shortly before January 1215, when his lands passed to his son. His widow continued to hold the castle, undergoing another prolonged siege by rebels in 1217, until she retired in 1226 and died in 1230.

== Landholdings ==
In addition to Middleton Stoney, from his father he inherited lands at King's Sutton and Duddington in Northamptonshire, Godington in Oxfordshire and Avington in Berkshire. In 1166 his father also had nine knight's fees in the honour of Mowbray, probably derived from the honour of Stuteville, which he presumably inherited as well.

== Family ==
By 1185 he had married Nicola de la Haie, widow of William fitz Erneis and one of three daughters and co-heiresses of Richard de la Haie – a major Lincolnshire landowner whose family had founded the Premonstratensian house of Barlings Priory – and his wife Matilda, daughter of William Vernon. Her paternal grandfather Robert de la Haie, of Halnaker in Sussex (now West Sussex), had in 1115 been granted the posts of hereditary constable of Lincoln Castle and hereditary sheriff of Lincolnshire. His children included:

- Richard, who in 1200 married Eustacia, widow of Thomas Verdon and daughter and heir of Gilbert Basset; she died soon after February 1217. They had a daughter Idonea, who married William II Longespée.
- Nicola, who married Oliver Deincourt.
