= Buck baronets =

Extinct baronetcy in the Baronetage of England

The Buck Baronetcy, of Hamby Grange in the County of Lincoln, was a title in the Baronetage of England. It was created on 22 December 1660 for John Buck, subsequently High Sheriff of Lincolnshire from 1663 to 1664. The second Baronet was High Sheriff of Lincolnshire from 1689 to 1690. The fourth Baronet was High Sheriff of Lincolnshire from 1780 to 1781. The title became extinct on his death in 1782.

Sir John Buck, father of the first Baronet, was High Sheriff of Lincolnshire from 1619 to 1620 and again from 1640 to 1641.

== Buck baronets, of Hamby Grange (1660) ==
- Sir John Buck, 1st Baronet (died c. 1669)
- Sir William Buck, 2nd Baronet (c. 1655–1717)
- Sir Charles Buck, 3rd Baronet (c. 1692–1729)
- Sir Charles Louis Buck, 4th Baronet (1722–1782)
  - William Buck (died before 1782)
