= Fillingham =

Village and civil parish in the West Lindsey district of Lincolnshire, England

Coordinates: 53.360925°N 0.57842°W

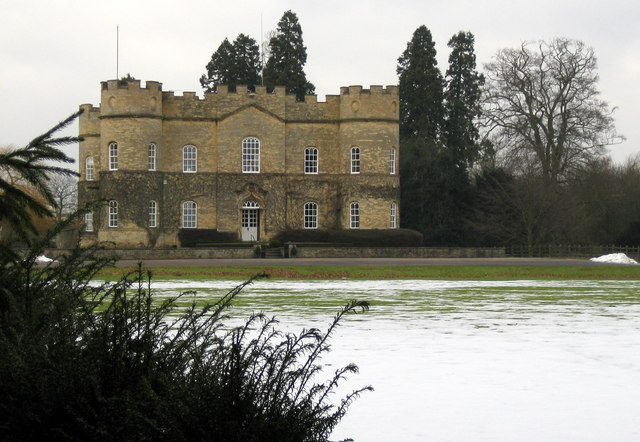
- Fillingham Castle

- Location within Lincolnshire
- Population: 242 (2011)
- OS grid reference: SK947858
  - London: 130 mi (210 km) S
- District: West Lindsey
- Shire county: Lincolnshire
- Region: East Midlands
- Country: England
- Sovereign state: United Kingdom
- Post town: Gainsborough
- Postcode district: DN21
- Police: Lincolnshire
- Fire: Lincolnshire
- Ambulance: East Midlands
- UK Parliament: Gainsborough

Fillingham is a village and civil parish in the West Lindsey district of Lincolnshire, England. It is situated 9 miles (14.5 km) north from the city and county town of Lincoln, and just over 1 mile (1.6 km) west from the A15 road.

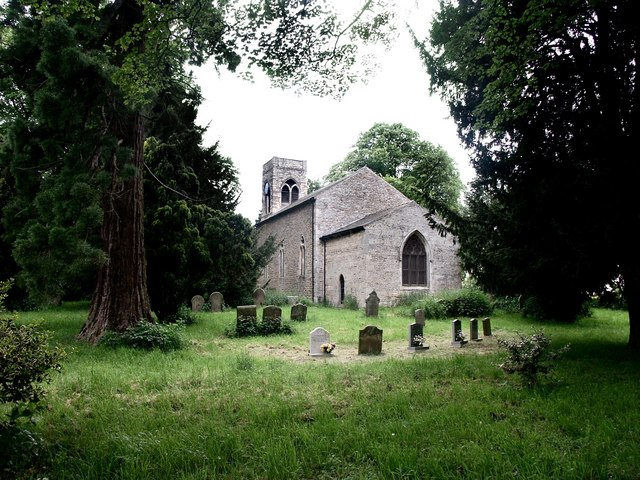
St Andrew's Church, Fillingham

Fillingham Grade II* listed Anglican church is dedicated to St Andrew. Originally a building in Early English and Decorated style, it was largely rebuilt in 1777 with a new chancel and tower. It was further restored in 1866. The earliest element is a c.1200 round-headed doorway in the west transept. In the churchyard is a cross, 30 feet (9 m) high, dedicated to Major Thomas N. Dalton, killed in the Battle of Inkerman in 1854. John Wycliffe was rector of the village from 1361 to 1368.

There is evidence of a Roman camp in the village and Anglo Saxon pottery has also been found. Archaeological excavations have also found evidence of an Anglo Saxon cemetery which may have been associated with a second church in the village.

Fillingham Castle is a castellated mansion built in 1760 by Sir Cecil Wray. A nearby stone manor house was built about a century before.

Fillingham Lake is one of the sources of the River Till, a small river whose lower reaches form the Fossdyke Navigation.
