= W. G. Cragg =

British Army officer and politician (1883–1956)

Major William Gilliat Cragg, DSO, FRGS (1883 – 24 April 1956) was a British Army officer and local politician.

== Life ==
William Gilliat Cragg was born on 21 June 1883, the elder son of Captain William Alfred Cragg (b. 1859), JP, FSA, of Threekingham House, Lincolnshire, and his wife, Adelaide Alexandra, daughter of Richard Gilliat, of Barham, East Hoathley, Sussex. Born in Spanby, the elder Cragg farmed and owned considerable land and lived at nearby Threekingham House; a graduate of Lincoln College, Oxford, he served as a justice of the peace, captained the 4th Battalion of the Lincolnshire Regiment (1887–98), sat on Kesteven County Council (as a councillor and alderman) for 33 years and worked as Secretary of the Lincolnshire Archaeological Society for 30 years; he died at his Threekingham residence, aged 90, in 1950.

The younger Cragg married twice: firstly, in 1909, to Violet Emily, daughter of Leonard Wodehouse Andrews, of Tunbridge Wells; she died in 1934 and the following year, he married Beryl Winifred Reynolds, of Ascot, daughter of H. H. Reynolds.

Following schooling at Shrewsbury, Cragg trained at the Royal Military College, Sandhurst. He was commissioned into the Loyal North Lancashire Regiment and served in World War I in Gallipoli and Mesopotamia, commanding the 6th Battalion of his regiment in 1917, before taking command of the 38th Infantry Brigade. After the war, he commanded the London District Discharge Centre (July 1919–June 1920). He then retired, and worked in the Political Service in Nigeria.

After retiring from the Nigeria Political Service in 1932, Cragg entered local politics in Lincolnshire. He was a member of Kesteven County Council from 1932 to 1952, and served as High Sheriff of Lincolnshire from 1933 to 1934. Cragg received the Distinguished Service Order during World War I and later became a Fellow of the Royal Geographical Society. He died on 24 April 1956 in London, aged 73.
