= William Hussey (died 1556) =

English politician

Sir William Hussey (by 1493 – 19 January 1556) was an English politician.

He was the eldest son of John Hussey, 1st Baron Hussey of Sleaford, who had been executed in 1536 and whose title had been extinguished. William was knighted in 1529.

He was High Sheriff of Lincolnshire for 1530–31 and was a Member (MP) of the Parliament of England for Grantham in 1529.

He married Ursula, daughter and coheiress of Sir Robery Lovell. They had two daughters.
