= Avington, Berkshire =

Coordinates: 51.41°N 01.46°W

Avington
- Village
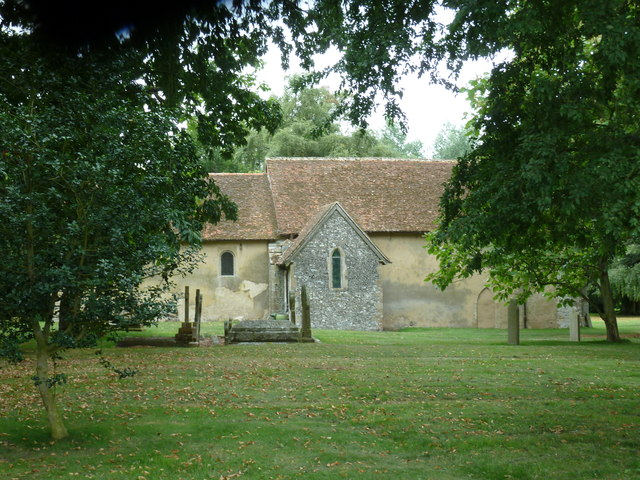
- Parish church of SS Mark and Luke

- Location within Berkshire
- OS grid reference: SU3768
- Civil parish: Kintbury
- Unitary authority: West Berkshire
- Ceremonial county: Berkshire
- Region: South East
- Country: England
- Sovereign state: United Kingdom
- Post town: Hungerford
- Postcode district: RG17 0
- Dialling code: 01488
- Police: Thames Valley
- Fire: Royal Berkshire
- Ambulance: South Central
- UK Parliament: Newbury

Avington is a village in the civil parish of Kintbury, in the West Berkshire district of Berkshire, England. The village is on the River Kennet, just under 1 mile (1.6 km) northwest of Kintbury village and 2 miles (3 km) east of the town of Hungerford. The Kennet and Avon Canal follows the river and passes the village.

== Toponym ==
The toponym is derived from Old English and means "the enclosure (tūn) of Afa's people". The Domesday Book of 1086 records it as Avintone and a pipe roll from 1167 records it as Avintona.

== Administrative history ==
Avington was an ancient parish. The parish was abolished in 1934 and its area absorbed into the neighbouring parish of Kintbury. At the 1931 census (the last before the abolition of the parish), Avington had a population of 77.

== Parish church ==
The Church of England parish church of Saints Mark and Luke is an 11th-century Norman building. It consists of only a nave, chancel and late 19th-century north transept. The font is a notable piece of Romanesque sculpture and may be Saxon. The south doorway is a Norman arch. The chancel has Norman vaulting and a Norman arch, both with beakhead ornament. A few early Gothic additions to the church were made in the 13th century, including two doorways and a "low-side" window. The church is a Grade I listed building.

== Bibliography ==
- Ditchfield, PH; Page, William, eds. (1924). "Avington". A History of the County of Berkshire. Victoria County History. Vol. IV. assisted by John Hautenville Cope. London: The St Katherine Press. pp. 21–24.
- Ekwall, Eilert (1960) [1936]. Concise Oxford Dictionary of English Place-Names (4th ed.). Oxford: Oxford University Press. Avington. ISBN 0198691033.
- Pevsner, Nikolaus (1966). Berkshire. The Buildings of England. Harmondsworth: Penguin Books. p. 75.
