= High Sheriff of Lincolnshire =

Ceremonial officer of the English county of Lincolnshire

This is a list of High Sheriffs of Lincolnshire.

The High Sheriff is the oldest secular office under the Crown. Formerly the High Sheriff was the principal law enforcement officer in the county but over the centuries most of the responsibilities associated with the post have been transferred elsewhere or are now defunct, so that its functions are now largely ceremonial. The High Sheriff changes every March.

Between 1974 and 1996 the shrievalty in Lincolnshire was interrupted when the County of Humberside took over the complete northern part of the county. In 1996 the northern bailiwicks reverted to Lincolnshire once more, after eight North Lincolnshire based High Sheriffs of Humberside had administered the area.

== 10th to 12th century ==
- Thorold
- Alwin
- Thorold
- c.1066–1068: Merleswein
- 1068–: Ivo de Taillebois
- ?-1115: Osbert
- 1115-: Wigod
- c1129: Rainer of Bath
- 1130s: Hacon
- 1154: Rainer of Bath
- 1155: Jordan of Blossevilla
- 1156–1162: Walter de Amundevel
- 1163–1164: Peter de Gossa
- 1165: William de Lisle
- 1166 Aluredus de Poiltona
- 1167–1168: Philip de Kyme
- 1169–1170: Walter of Grimesby
- 1171–1174: Walter and Aluredus de Poiltona
- 1175–1176: Drogo, son of Radulph
- 1177–1183: William Basset of Sapcote, Leics
- 1184–1187: Nigel, son of Alexander
- 1189: Gerard de Camville and Roger de Stikewald
- 1190: Gerard de Camville
- 1191: William de Stuteville
- 1191–1192: Gerard de Camville and Roger de Stikewald
- 1193: Gerard de Camville and Eustatius de Hedenham
- 1194: Simon de Kyme and Peter de Trehanton
- 1195–1196: Simon de Kyme and Peter of Beckering and Robert de Trehanton
- 1197: Philip son of Robert
- 1199: Robert de Tatteshall

== 13th century ==
- 1200–1205: Gerard de Camville and Hugh son of Richard
- 1206–1208: Sir Thomas Moulton
- 1209–1210 Hubert de Burgh and Alex Ormesby
- 1211: Hubert de Burgh and Robert de Aoziulver
- 1212: Hubert de Burgh and Robert Aquilum
- 1213–1214: Hubert de Burgh and Robert Aquilum and Alex de Puncton
- 1215: John Marescallus (Sir John Marshal)
- 1216: Nicholaa de la Haye (a woman) was appointed jointly with Philip Marc
- 1216: William Longespée, 3rd Earl of Salisbury and William son of Warner
- 1217–1221: William Longespée, 3rd Earl of Salisbury and John Bonet
- 1222–1223: Stephen de Segne and Radulphus the son of Regin.
- 1224–1225: Hugh of Wells and Radulphus son of Regin.
- 1226–1228: Radulphus son of Regin.
- 1227: Hugh de Neville
- 1229: Robert de Rokefield
- 1230–1231; Walter de Cuerame and William de Curum
- 1232–1235: Phillip de Lacelles
- 1236–1239: Robert Wolf (Lupus)
- 1240–1244: Radulph de Basset
- 1245: William de Derleg
- 1246–1250: William son of Curzim
- 1251–1255: Gilbertus de Cheile
- 1256: Roger Beler
- 1257: William de Leverton
- 1258: John de Cookerington
- 1259: William of Angleby and William of Nottingham
- 1260–1261: Hamo Hauteyn
- 1262–1264: William de Grey
- 1265: William and Richard de Grey and William of Nottingham
- 1266–1267: Richard and William Will. and James Panton
- 1268–1271: Jacobus Panton
- 1272–1274: Thomas De Bolton
- 1275: Richardus De Harington
- 1276–1278: Nicholaus De Rye
- 1279–1281: Adamus De Sancto Laudo
- 1282: Radulphus De Arnehall
- 1283–1285: Radulphus De Arnhall and Walterus De Stuchesse
- 1286–1290: Robertus De Cadworth
- 1291–1292: Johannes Dyne
- 1293: Johannes and Radulphus De Trihampton
- 1294–1297: Robertus le Venur
- 1298–1299: Radulphus De Paynell and Richard De Draycot

== 14th century ==
- 1300: Ricardus De Howell
- 1301-2: Hugo De Bussey
- 1303: Thomas Filius Eustarchi
- 1304: Thomas Filius Eustarchi and Johannes Nevile
- 1305–1307: Thomas De Burnham
- 1308-9: Radulphus Paynell
- 1310: Thomas De Burnham
- 1311-12: Johannes De Neville and Radulphus De Rye
- 1313-14: Johannes De Neville
- 1315-16: Thomas De Tittele and Johannes De Nevile
- 1317: Johannes De Nevile and Robertus De Staunton
- 1318: Robertus De Staunton
- 1319: Robertus De Staunton and Simon De Landerthorpe
- 1320–1323 Johannes De Bellafide
- 1324: Simon le Chamberlayne
- 1325-6: Simon le Chamberlayne and Reginaldus Donington
- 1327: Thomas De Novo Mercato
- 1328: Simon Kinardsley
- 1329-30: Thomas De Novo Mercato
- 1331: Radulphus De Sancto Laudo and Thomas De Novo Mercato
- 1332-3: Reginaldus De Donington and Radulphus De Sancto Laudo
- 1334-5: Johannes De Trehamptor
- 1336: Radulphus De Sancto Laudo and Reginaldus De Donington
- 1337: Johannes De Bolingbroke and Johannes De Trehampton
- 1338-9: Gilbertus De Beaved
- 1340-1: Willielmus Disney and Gilbertus De Leddred
- 1342: Willielmus Franuke
- 1343: Johannes De Hundon
- 1344-5: Saierus De Rochford
- 1346-8 :Johannes De Trehampton
- 1349–1354: Saierus De Rochford
- 1355–1358: Thomas De Fulvetby and Saierus De Rochford
- 1359-60: Johannes De Cormil
- 1361-2: Johannes De Boys
- 1363–1368: Willielmus Handley
- 1369–1372: Thomas De Fulvetby
- 1373: Willielmus Bussey
- 1374: Johannes Hode
- 1375: Thomas De Kydale
- 1376: Rogerus De Baler
- 1377: Radolphus "Ralph" Paynel
- 1378: Thomas De Kydale De Ferriby
- 1379: William De Spaygne
- 1380: John Ponger
- 1381: Thomas Thimelby of Poolham
- 1382: William Belesby De Belesby
- 1383: John Ponger
- 1384: John Bussey De Hather
- 1385: William Spayne
- 1386: John Bussey De Hather
- 1387: Phillip De Tilney De Boston
- 1388: William Belesby De Belesby
- 1389: Anketin Mallore
- 1390: Walter Tailboys of Sotby and Skellingthorpe
- 1391: John Bussey De Hather
- 1392: John Rochford of Fenn of Boston
- 1393: Henry de Retford of Castlethorpe and Carlton Raynell
- 1394: John Copildyke of Harrington
- 1395: John Skipwith of Ormsby
- 1396: John Walsh, of Grimsby
- 1397: Roger Welby
- 1398: Henry de Redford of Castlethorpe and Carlton Raynell
- 1399: John Littlebury, Kt

== 15th century ==
- 1400: Sir John Copildyke, Kt
- 1401: Sir John Rochford, Kt and Thomas Swynford
- 1402: Gerard Sothill of Itedbourn, Kt
- 1403-4: Thomas Willoughby, of Eresby, Kt
- 1405: Thomas Hawley of Grisby and Utterby
- 1406: Sir Henry Redford of Castlethorpe and Carlton Raynell
- 1407: Ralph Rochford, Kt
- 1408: Sir Thomas Chaworth of Wiverton, Notts. and Alfreton, Derbys.
- 1409: Sir John Rochford
- 1410: John De Waterton, of Waterton
- 1411-12: Robert Waterton, of Waterton
- 1413: Thomas Clarell
- 1414: Robert Hilton
- 1415: Thomas Cumberworth, of Cumberworth, Kt
- 1416: Nicholas Tournay of Cainby
- 1417: John Normanvile
- 1418: Sir Thomas Chaworth of Wiverton, Notts. and Alfreton, Derbys.
- 1419: Richard Hansard of South Kelsey
- 1420: Robert Roos, of Melton
- 1421: Robert Clarell
- 1422: Thomas Clarell
- 1423: Walter Tailboys
- 1424: John Haytfeld
- 1425: Robert Hildyard
- 1426: John Talboys
- 1427: William Copuldike
- 1428: Henry Retford
- 1429: Hamon Sutton of Willoughby
- 1430: William Rither, Kt
- 1431: Thomas Cumberworth, of Cumberwerth, Kt
- 1432: Robert Roos of Melton, Kt
- 1433: John Pigot, of Doddington
- 1434: Thomas Darcy, of Norton
- 1435: John Constable, of Halsham
- 1436: Robert Roos, of Melton, Kt
- 1437: Thomas Meres, of Kirton
- 1438: Phillip Tilney, of Boston
- 1439: Hugh Willoughby, of Eresby, Kt
- 1440: John Neville
- 1441: Nicholas Bowet, Kt
- 1442: Roger Pedwardin, of Burton Pedwardin, Kt
- 1443: John Soothil, of Redbourn
- 1444-5: Thomas Moigne
- 1446: John Harrington
- 1447: Thomas Meres, of Kirton
- 1448: Nicholas Bowet, Kt
- 1449: Mancer Marmyon, of Rippingale & Galby, Kt
- 1450: Brian Stapleton
- 1451: William Rither, Kt
- 1452: Nicholas Bowet, Kt
- 1453: John Neville
- 1454: Richard Waterton, of Waterton
- 1455: Henry Retford, Kt
- 1456: John Tempest
- 1457: John Harrington
- 1458: Richard Waterton, of Waterton
- 1459: William Skipwith of South Ormsby
- 1460: John Marmyon, of Rippingale & Galby
- 1461: Thomas Borough of Gainsborough
- 1462-3: Thomas Blount
- 1464: William Skipwith, of South Ormsby, Kt
- 1465: Brian Stapleton, Kt
- 1466: John Whichcote, of Harpswell
- 1467: Robert Constable, of Halsham, Kt
- 1468: Thomas Meres, of Kirton
- 1469: Richard FitzWilliam, of Mablethorpe, Kt
- 1470: Richard Tempest, Kt
- 1471: Richard Welby
- 1472: Leonard Thornburgh
- 1473: Thomas Kime, of Friesney
- 1474: John Villiers, of Leicestershire
- 1475: Thomas Wimbech
- 1476: Robert Markham, of Sidebrook, Kt
- 1477: William Bolle {ambiguation of Bowles}
- 1478: William Browne
- 1479: Thomas Tempest
- 1480: John Bushy, Kt
- 1481: Robert Talboys, Kt
- 1482: William Tyrwhitt of Kettleby (1st term)
- 1483: Thomas Knight
- 1484: Robert Dymoke, Kt (1st term)
- 1485: Thomas Meres, of Kirton
- 1486: Thomas Pinchbeck
- 1487: Brian Standford
- 1488: John Copuldike, of Harrington
- 1489: Thomas Tempest, Kt
- 1490: Oliver St. John, Kt
- 1491: Henry Willoughby, of Eresby, Kt
- 1492: Thomas Welby
- 1493: John Skipwith, of South Ormsby
- 1494: John Hussey, of Sleaford
- 1494: William Tyrwhitt
- 1495: William Shirwell, Kt
- 1496: George Talboys
- 1497: Mancer Marmion, of Rippingale & Galby
- 1498: Thomas Knight
- 1499: Thomas De la Land, of Ashby, Kt

== 16th century ==
- 1500 William Ayscough of Kelsey
- 1501 Sir William Tyrwhitt, of Kettleby (2nd term)
- 1502 Henry Willoughby, of Eresby, Kt
- 1503 Robert Dymoke, Kt (2nd term)
- 1504 Leonard Percy
- 1505 William Ayscough, of Kelsey, Kt
- 1506 Miles Bushy, Kt
- 1507 Robert Sutton, of Willoughby
- 1508-9 William Ayscough, of Kelsey, Kt
- 1510: Robert Dymoke, Kt (3rd term)
- 1511: Sir Thomas Parr, of Kendal
- 1512: Edward Guildford, of Kent
- 1513: Thomas Cheney, Kt
- 1514: Marmaduke Constable, jnr, of Halsham, Kt
- 1515: George Fitzwilliam, of Mablethorpe
- 1516: Lionel Dymoke, Kt
- 1517: William Hansard, of South Kelsey, Kt
- 1518: Sir William Tyrwhitt, of Kettleby(3rd term)
- 1519: Thomas Burgh, 1st Baron Burgh, of Gainsborough
- 1520: Sir Robert Tyrwhitt
- 1521: Sir William Ayscough of Kelsey
- 1522: Francis Browne of Tolethorpe and Little Casterton, Rutland.
- 1523: Andrew Belesby of Belesby, Kt
- 1524: Sir Robert Tyrwhitt (son of Sir William, HS 1483)
- 1525: Thomas Burgh, 1st Baron Burgh, of Gainsborough
- 1526: Sir Gilbert Tailboys of Kyme
- 1527: Sir William Skipwith of South Ormsby
- 1528: Thomas Portington
- 1529: George Fitzwilliam of Mablethorpe
- 1530: Andrew Belesby of Belesby, Kt
- 1531: Sir William Hussey of Beauvale, Nottinghamshire
- 1532: William Disney, of Norton Disney
- 1533: Sir John Markham of Sidebroke
- 1534: George Fitzwilliam of Mablethorpe, Kt
- 1535: John Goodrick
- 1536: Edward Dymoke of Scrivelsby (son of Robert, HS 1484) (1st term)
- 1537: William Tyrwhitt, Kt
- 1538: John Harrington, Kt
- 1539: Sir William Newenham
- 1540: William Sandon, Kt
- 1541: Sir Robert Tyrwhitt
- 1542: Thomas Dymoke
- 1543: Robert Hussey, of Halton, Kt
- 1544: William Sandon, Kt
- 1545: Francis Ayscough, of Kelsey, Kt
- 1546: William Dallison, of Laughton
- 1546: Andrew Nowell
- 1547: Edward Dymoke of Scrivelsby (2nd term)
- 1548: Sir John Copledike of Harrington
- 1549: Francis Ayscough, of Kelsey, Kt
- 1550: Richard Bolle of Haugh
- 1551: Richard Thymbleby of Irnham (1st term)
- 1552: Sir William Skipwith of South Ormsby (1st term)
- 1553: Sir Francis Ayscough
- 1554: William Mounson
- 1555: Edward Dymoke of Scrivelsby (3rd term)
- 1556: Richard D'Isney of Norton Disney
- 1557: Thomas Lyttelbery
- 1558: William Thoralde
- 1559: Sir Robert Tyrwhitt (2nd term)
- 1560: Richard Thymbleby of Irnham
- 1561: Richard Welby
- 1562: Adlard Welby
- 1563: Sir William Skipwith of South Ormsby (2nd term)
- 1564: Richard Bertie of Grimsthorpe Castle
- 1565: Thomas St Poll of Snarford and North Carlton
- 1566: Richard D'Isney of Norton Disney
- 1567: John Copledike of Harrington
- 1568: John Carr or Robert Carr of Sleaford
- 1569: Richard Bolle of Haugh
- 1570: Thomas Quadringe
- 1571: Anthony Thorold
- 1572: William Hunston
- 1573: Sir Robert Savile
- 1574: Andrew Gedney of Bag Enderby
- 1575: William Metham of Bullington
- 1576: George Heneage of Hainton
- 1577: John Monson of South Carlton
- 1578: Francis Manby of Elsham
- 1579: Thomas St Paul of Snarford and North Carlton
- 1580: William Fitzwilliam, of Mablethorpe
- 1581: Robert Carr, jun. of Sleaford
- 1582: Daniel Disney of Norton Disney
- 1583: Edward Tyrwhitt
- 1584: Sir Edward Dymoke of Scrivelsby (son of Edward, HS 1536)
- 1585: William Heneage of Hainton
- 1586: Bartholomew Armyn of Osgodby
- 1587: Edward Ayscough of Kelsey
- 1588: Sir George St Paul, 1st Baronet of Melwood and Snarford
- 1589: John Markham of Sidebroke
- 1590: John Savile, 1st Baron Savile of Pontefract of Doddington
- 1591: Charles Hussey of Hunington (son of Robert, HS 1543)
- 1592: Nicholas Saunderson of Fillingham
- 1593: Valentine Browne of Croft
- 1594: William Wray later Sir William Wray, 1st Baronet, of Glentworth
- 1595: Phillip Tyrwhitt of Kettleby
- 1596: John Meres
- 1597: Sir Thomas Monson, 1st Baronet of South Carlton
- 1598: Sir William Heneage of Hainton
- 1599: Robert Tyrwhitt of Kettleby

== 17th century ==
- 1600: Thomas Grantham, of Goltho and St. Katherine's Priory, Lincoln
- 1601: Sir Roger Dallison of Laughto
- 1602: William Pelham of Brockleby then Sir William Armyn, of Osgodb
- 1603: Sir William Armyn, of Osgodby
- 1604: Sir Edward Marbury, of Giraby
- 1605: Sir Richard Amcotts
- 1606: Sir William Welby
- 1607: Sir Gervaise Helwich, of Worretly
- 1608: Sir Richard Ogle, of Pinchbeck
- 1609: Sir John Read, of Wrangle
- 1610: Sir John Hatcher, of Careby
- 1611: Robert Tyrwhitt, of Cameringham
- 1612: Sir John Langton, of Langton
- 1613: Sir Nicholas Saunderson, 1st Baronet, of Saxby
- 1614: Sir Edward Carr, 1st Baronet, of Sleaford
- 1615: Sir John Thorold
- 1616: Sir Francis Zouch, of Kelstern
- 1617: Anthony Thorold
- 1618: Sir Edward Hussey, 1st Baronet, of Hunington
- 1619: Sir John Buck, of Hamby Grange
- 1620: Thomas Taylor, of Doddington Pigot
- 1621: Richardson Hickson, of Ropesley
- 1622: Sir George Southcote, of Blythborough
- 1623: Sir Thomas Middlecot, of Boston
- 1625: William Lister, of Coleby
- 1625: Sir John Wray, 2nd Baronet, of Wharton
- 1626: Sir John Bolles, 1st Baronet, of Scampton
- 1627: James Brampton
- 1628: George Heneage
- 1629: Sir William Airmine, 1st Baronet, of Osgodby and Orton Longueville, Hunts
- 1630 Sir Daniel de Ligne, of Harlaxton
- 1631: Sir Edward Ayscough, of South Kelsey
- 1632: Sir William Thorold, 1st Baronet, of Marston
- 1633: Gervase Scroop
- 1634: Sir Walter Norton
- 1635: William Pelham, of Brockleby
- 1636: Sir Edward Hussey, 1st Baronet, of Hunington
- 1637: Sir Anthony Irby, of Whaplode
- 1638: Thomas Grantham
- 1639: Sir John Brownlow, 1st Baronet
- 1640: Sir Thomas Trollope, 1st Baronet, of Casewick
- 1642: Sir Edward Heron
- 1643: Edward King, of Ashby de la Launde
- 1644: Thomas Lister
- 1645: Francis Clinton alias Fynes
- 1646: John Howson
- 1647: Sir Richard Earle, 1st Baronet
- 1648: Edmond Anderson
- 1649: Edward Maddeton
- 1651: John Wincoppe
- 1652: Robert Barkham
- 1653: Robert Christofer
- 1654: Henry Massingberd
- 1655: Drayner Massingberd
- 1657: Sir George Winn, Baronet
- 1660: Sir William Trollope, 2nd Baronet of Casewick
- 1662: Sir Edward Dymoke
- 1663: Sir John Buck, 1st Baronet
- 1664: Sir Edward Barkham, 1st Baronet of Wainflete
- 1665: Edward Ayscough
- 12 November 1665: Sir John Brownlow, 1st Baronet
- 7 November 1666: Sir Michael Airmine, 3rd Baronet
- 6 November 1667: William Welby
- 6 November 1668: Sir Thomas Hussey, 2nd Baronet, of Honington and Doddington
- 11 November 1669: William Lister, of Coleby Hall
- 4 November 1670: Thomas Brown, of Saltfleetby
- 9 November 1671: Sir Edmund Winn, 2nd Baronet<
- 11 November 1672: Sir William Humble, 1st Baronet
- 12 November 1673: John Luddington
- 5 November 1674: Sebastian Crawford or Sigismund Trafford, of Walthamstow, Essex and Dunton Hall, Tydd St. Mary
- 15 November 1675: Sir Richard Earle, 3rd Baronet
- 10 November 1676: John Hatcher, of Careby
- 15 November 1677: Sir Christopher Nevile
- 17 November 1677: Thomas Harrington, of Boothby Pagnell
- 14 November 1678: Sir Christopher Nevile, of Haddington, Aubourn
- 27 November 1678: Joseph Edmunds
- 13 November 1679: Ralph Madeson
- 4 November 1680: Sir Christopher Nevile, of Haddington, Aubourn
- 8 November 1681: Sir Edmond Turnor of Stoke Rochford
- 1683: Sir Christopher Clapham, of Uffington
- 1684: Sir Edward Ayscough, of South Kelsey
- 1685: Sir Edward Ayscough
- 1686: William Stowe, of Newton-on-Trent
- 1687: Anthony Eyre
- 1689: Sir John Brownlow, 3rd Baronet, of Belton
- 1689: Sir William Buck, 2nd Baronet
- 1690: John Chaplin, of Tathwell
- 1691: Christopher Hale
- 1692: Edward Payne
- 1693: Sir Richard Rothwell, Bt replaced by Thomas Pownall
- 1694: Sir John Tyrwhitt, 5th Baronet, of Stainfield Hall
- 1695: Sir Pury Cust
- 1696: Thomas Lister, of Coleby
- 1697: Stephen Rothwell
- 1698: Martin Browne, of Louth
- 1699: Francis Grantham

== 18th century ==
- 1700: Christopher Berisford
- 1701: Robert Elways
- 1701: Robert Tyrwhitt
- 1702: Francis Pains
- 1703: Francis Fane
- 1704: Sir Thomas Trollope, 3rd Baronet
- 1705: Richard Welby of Denton
- 1706: Charles Pelham
- 1707: Matthew Boucherett of Stallingborough
- 1708: John Toller of Billingborough Hall
- 1709: William Hide of Langtoffe
- 1710: Sir John Sherard
- 1711: Marmaduke Dayrell
- 1712: John Cholmondely replaced by James Cholmondely
- 1713: Thomas Hatcher
- 1714: Edmond Turner
- 1715: Francis Anderson
- 1716: Sir Cecil Wray, 11th Baronet of Glentworth
- 1717: Bartholomew Burton
- 1718: Francis Browne of Gretford
- 1719: Richard Nelthorp of Scaleby (Scawby?)
- 1720: John Maddison
- 1721: Sir Richard Cust, 2nd Baronet of Stamford
- 1722: John Becke
- 1723: Sir John Thorold, 7th Baronet
- 1724: Sigismund Trafford
- 1725: Sir Samuel Thorold, 2nd Baronet of Harmston
- 1726: James Stovin
- 1727: Vincent Amcoates
- 1728: Philips Glover
- 1729: Matthew Humberston of Humberston
- 1729: Henry Andrews of Osgodby
- 1730: Thomas Pindar
- 1731: Thomas Payne
- 1732: Thomas Dallison
- 1733: William D'Autrey
- 1733: Coningsby Sibthorp of Canwick Hall
- 1734: John Buissere
- 1735: Robert Lichford of Boothby
- 1736: Joseph Banks II of Revesby Abbey
- 1737: Coney Tunnard
- 1738: St John Wells of Alford
- 1739: Thomas Burell
- 1740: Richard Poplewell of Belton
- 1741: Sir Henry Nelthorpe, 5th Baronet
- 1742: Francis Dayrell
- 1743: John Cholmeley of Easton
- 1744: Henry Herring replaced by James Pennyman
- 1745: William Burrell Massingberd
- 1746: William Welby
- 1747: Gilbert Caldecott
- 1748: George Gregory
- 1749: Christopher Neville of Grantham
- 1750: Sir John de la Fountaine Tyrwhitt, Bt. of Stainfield Hall
- 1751: Sir John Thorold, 8th Baronet
- 1752: Richard Hardwick of Spilsby
- 1753: Charles Amcotts of Harrington
- 1754: Ayscoghe Boucheret of Stallingborough
- 1755: William Marshall of Theddlethorpe
- 1756: Thomas Lister of Brough cum Gearsby
- 1757: Bennet Langton of Langton
- 1758: Jervase Scrope, of Lincoln
- 1759: Joseph Dixon of Fulbeck
- 1760: Clement Trafford of Dunton Hall
- 1761: William Roe of Sudbrooke
- 1762: Thomas Mainwaring of Kettlethorpe
- 1763: Zachariah Bourryau of Bliburgh
- 1763: William Gildas of Barton-upon-Humber
- 1764: Marmaduke Tomlyn of Lincoln
- 1765: Thomas Williamson of Allington
- 1766: John Somerscales of East Ravendale
- 1767: Sir John Nelthorpe, 6th Baronet, of Barton
- 1768: Joseph Walls of East Kirkby
- 1769: John Hopkinson of Burton Coggles
- 1770: Edward Parker of Glandford Briggs
- 1771: David Field of Ulceby, died and replaced by Charles Anderson-Pelham, 1st Baron Yarborough of Brocklesby
- 1772: Montague Cholmeley, of Easton
- 1773: John Key of Leadenham
- 1774: Michael Newton of Culverthorpe
- 1775: John Nelthorpe of Little Grimsby
- 1776: Thomas Douglas of Grantham
- 1777: Sir Christopher Whichcote, 4th Bt of Aswarby
- 1778: Sir John Thorold, 9th Baronet of Syston Park
- 1779: John Maddison of Gainsborough
- 1780: Sir Charles Buck, Bt of Hanby
- 1781: Edward Nelthorpe of Scawby
- 1782: William Pennyman of Little Ponton
- 1783: Sir Jenison William Gordon, 2nd Baronet of Branston
- 1784: Charles William Johnson of Witham-on-the Hill
- 1785: Charles Chaplin, of Blankney
- 1786: Samuel Graves of Spalding replaced by Daniel Douglas of Folkingham
- 1787: Theophilus Buckworth of Spalding
- 1788: Edward Brown of Stamford
- 1789: Lewis Dymoke of Screvelsby
- 1790: Sir Thomas Whichcote, 5th Baronet of Aswarby
- 1791: Robert Mitchell Robinson of Hanthorpe
- 1792: Christopher Neville of Wellingore
- 1793: Richard Ellison of Sudbrooke Holme
- 1794: Sir Joseph Banks, 1st Baronet
- 1795: Ayscoghe Boucherett of Willingham and Stallingborough
- 1796: Sir William Earle Welby, 1st Baronet of Denton Hall
- 1797: John Cracroft of Hackthorn Hall
- 1798: Burton Shaw of West Willoughby
- 1799: Henry Hopkinson of Castle Bytham

== 19th century ==
- 5 February 1800: Matthew Bancroft Lister, of Burwell Park
- 11 February 1801: Charles Mainwaring, of Goltho
- 3 February 1802: Henry Dalton, of Naith
- 3 February 1803: Sir Henry Nelthorpe, 7th Baronet, of Scawby Hall
- 1 February 1804: Robert Vyner, of Godby
- 6 February 1805: Montague Cholmeley, of Grantham
- 1 February 1806: William Reeve, of Leadenham House
- 4 February 1807: Marmaduke Nelson Grayburne, of Barton
- 3 February 1808: Lord William Beauclerk, of Radbourne
- 6 February 1809: Sir Robert Heron, 2nd Baronet, of Stubton Hall
- 31 January 1810: Edmund Turnor, of Panton and Stoke Rochford
- 8 February 1811: Sir John Trollope, 6th Baronet, of Casewick
- 24 January 1812: George Lister, of Girsby
- 10 February 1813: George Robert Heneage, of Hainton
- 4 February 1814: Robert Vyner, of Gautby
- 13 February 1815: Joseph Livesey, of Stourton Hall
- 1816: Nevile King of Ashby
- 1817: Sir Robert Sheffield, 4th Baronet of Normanby Hall
- 1818: John Charles Lucas Calcraft of Ancaster
- 1819: Ayscough Boucherett of Willingham
- 1820: William Thompson Corbett of Elsham
- 1821: Sir Richard Sutton, 2nd Baronet of Sudbrook
- 1822: Sir John Hayford Thorold, 10th Baronet of Syston Park
- 1823: Sir William Welby, 2nd Baronet of Denton Hall
- 1824: William Edward Tomline of Riby Grove
- 1825: Sir John Trollope, 7th Baronet of Casewick
- 1826: George Manners of Bloxholm Hall
- 1827: John Reeve of Leadenham House
- 1828: Charles Winn of Nostell Priory
- 1829: Richard Thorold of Weelsby House
- 1830: William Augustus Johnson, of Wytham on the Hill
- 1831: Henry Bacon Hickman, of Thonock House
- 1832: William Hutton, of Gateburton
- 1833: Henry Dymoke, of Scrivelsby Court
- 1834: Christopher Turnor, of Stoke Rochford
- 1835: Thomas Earle Welby, of Allington Hall
- 1836: Sir Montague Cholmeley, 2nd Baronet, of Easton Hall
- 1837: Sir Thomas Whichcote, 7th Baronet, of Aswarby
- 1838: Sir Culling Eardley Smith, 3rd Baronet, of Nettleton
- 1839: George Fieschi Heneage, of Hainton Hall
- 1840: Thomas George Corbett, of Elsham Hall
- 1841: Sir John Thorold, 11th Baronet, of Syston Park
- 1842: Sir John Nelthorpe, 8th Baronet, of Scawby
- 1843: George Hussey Packe, of Caythorpe
- 1844: Charles Thomas Clifford, of Irnham
- 1845: Thomas Coltman, of Hagnaby Priory
- 1846: James Banks Stanhope, of Revesby Abbey
- 1847: Theophilus Fairfax Johnson, of Spalding
- 1848: Richard Ellison, of Sudbrooke Holme
- 1849: James Whiting Yorke, of Walmsgate
- 1850: Henry Fane, of Fulbeck Hall
- 1851: Sir Charles Anderson, 9th Baronet, of Lea
- 1852: George Tomline, of Riby Grove
- 1853: Joseph Livesey, of Stourton Hall
- 1854: Anthony Willson, of South Rauceby Hall
- 1855: George Skipworth, of Mooretown House
- 1856: Charles Thomas John Moore, of Frampton Hall
- 1857: George Knollis Jarvis, of Doddington
- 1858: George Nevile, of Stubton Park
- 1859: Charles Thomas Samuel Birch Reynardson, of Holywell
- 1860: Sir Glynne Welby, 3rd Baronet, of Denton Hall
- 1861: Weston Cracroft Amcotts, of Hackthorn
- 1862: Thomas John Dixon, of Holton-le-Moor
- 1863: George Charles Uppleby, of Barrow
- 1864: William Parker, of Hanthorpe House, Bowen
- 1865: John Lewis Fytche, of Thorpe Hall, Louth
- 1866: Henry Robert Boucherett of North Willingham
- 1867: Sir Henry Hickman Bacon of Thonock
- 1868: John Wilson Fox of Girsby
- 1869: Augustus Charles Johnson of Ryhall, Stamford
- 1870: Alexander William Thorold Grant Thorold of Weelsby, Grimsby
- 1871: John Reeve of Leadenham
- 1872: Sir Robert Sheffield, 5th Baronet, of Normanby Hall
- 1873: Valentine Dudley Henry Cary Elwes of The Manor House, Brigg
- 1874: Bennet Rothes Langton of Langton
- 1875: Mildmay William Willson of South Rauceby
- 1876: Sir John Thorold, 12th Baronet of Syston Park
- 1877: Coningsby Charles Sibthorpe of Canwick Hall
- 1878: George Eden Jarvis of Doddington
- 1879: Murray Edward Gordon Finch-Hatton of Haverholme Priory
- 1880: Edward Heneage of Hainton Hall
- 1881: Nathaniel Clayton of Withcall
- 1882: William Henry Smith of South Elkington
- 1883: Ralph Henry Christopher Nevile of Wellingore
- 1884: George Morland Hutton of Gate Burton
- 1885: Sir Hugh Arthur Henry Cholmeley of Easton
- 1886: Richard George Ellison of Boultham
- 1887: Sir Hickman Beckett Bacon of Thonock
- 1888: Alexander Samuel Leslie Melville of Branston
- 1889: Alfred Shuttleworth of Lincoln
- 1890: Sir William Earle Welby Gregory of Denton Hall
- 1891: Joseph Ruston, of Monk's Manor, Lincoln
- 1892: William Garfit of West Skirbeck, Boston
- 1893: Edward Weston Cracroft of Hackthorn
- 1894: Edmund Turnor of Panton
- 1895: Charles Arthur Swan of Sausthorpe
- 1896: Charles Constable Curtis of South Collingham, Notts.
- 1897: Thomas Cheney Garfit of Kenwick Hall, Legbourne
- 1898: William Hornsby of Burwell Park, Louth
- 1899: Thomas Sherwin Pearson Gregory of Harlaxton
- 1900: Sir George Whichcote, 9th Bart., of Aswarby park, Sleaford

== 20th century ==
- 1901: Joseph Cliff, of Scawby Grove
- 1902: John Drysdale Sandars, of North Sandsfield, Gainsborough
- 1903: Arthur Gilstrap Soames, of Great Limber, Brocklesby
- 1904: Jack Sutcliffe, of Field House, Grimsby
- 1905: Sir Berkeley Digby George Sheffield, of Normanby Hall
- 1906: John St. Vigor Fox, of Girsby Manor
- 1907: Edgar Lubbock, of Caythorpe Court. Died in office 9 September 1907 and replaced November 1907 by William Vere Reeve Fane of Fulbeck Hall
- 1908: William Vere Reeve Fane, of Fulbeck Hall
- 1909: William Bennett, of Bank House, Grimsby
- 1910: Fitzalan Howard, of Holyrood House, Spalding
- 1911: John Sherard Reeve, of Leadenham House.
- 1912: George Henry Caton Haigh, of Grainsby Hall, Grimsby
- 1913: Henry John Hope Barton, of Saxby.
- 1914: Richard Castell Bacon, of Willingham by Stow
- 1915: Frederick Acton, of Miramar, Seacroft, Skegness
- 1916: Sir Francis Sowerby Bennett, of Fryston, Grimsby
- 1917: Lt. Col. Joseph Seward Ruston, of Monks Manor, Lincoln
- 1918: Christopher Hatton Turnor, of Stoke Rochford
- 1919: Meaburn Staniland, of Somersby.
- 1920: Maj. Herman Dickinson Marshall, of Pilham Hall, Gainsborough.
- 1921: Maj. Walter Hugh Rawnsley, of Well Vale, Alford.
- 1922: Capt. Richard Gleed, of Park House, Donington, Spalding.
- 1923: Joseph Tertius Talbot Cliff, of Scawby Grove, Brigg.
- 1924: Clement Henry Newsum, of Eastwood House, Lincoln.
- 1925: Col. Edward Kyme Cordeaux, of Brackenborough Lawn, Louth.
- 1926: Lt. Col. William Ernest George Archibald Weigall, of Petwood, Woodhall Spa.
- 1927: John Watkinson Ramsden, of Hareby House, Spilsby.
- 1928: Harry Ernest Knott, of The Towers, Grimsby.
- 1929: Tom Sutcliffe, of Stallingborough.
- 1930: Maj. Charles Francis Cracroft Jarvis, of Doddington.
- 1931: Lt. Col. Edmund Royds, of Stubton.
- 1932: Thomas Henry Haggas, of Walmsgate.
- 1933: Maj. William Gilliat Cragg, of Threekingham.
- 1934: Capt. Oscar Dixon Kenwick Hall, Legbourne.
- 1935: Edward Everard Earle Welby Everard, of Gosberton.
- 1936: John William Gleed, of West Elloe, Spalding.
- 1937: Lt. Cmdr. John Cracroft-Amcotts, of Rauceby.
- 1938: Maj. Dudley Roger Hugh Pelham, of Canwick Hall, Lincoln.
- 1939: George Tickler, of The Manor House, Bradley, Grimsby.
- 1940: Arthur Hovenden Worth, of Hovenden House, Fleet, Holbeach.
- 1941: Sir Robert Pattinson, of The Fosse House, Northgate, Lincoln.
- 1942: Sir John Denton Marsden, Baronet, of Panton Hall, Lincoln.
- 1943: Ernest William Bowser, of Tytton Hall, near Boston.
- 1944: John Vincent Sheffield, of Little Normanby, Scunthorpe.
- 1945: Thomas Whyment Atkinson, of Haconby Hall, near Bourne.
- 1946: Maj. Sir Ernest Sleight, 2nd Baronet, of Crossways, Stallingborough.
- 1947: Lt. Col. Sir Arthur Pelham Heneage, of Walesby Hall, near Market Rasen.
- 1948: George Arthur Worth, of Field House, Fleet, near Spalding.
- 1949: Lt. Col. John William Eric Graves Sandars, of Gate Burton Hall, Gainsborough.
- 1950: Maj. Harry Spilman of Aylesby Manor.
- 1951: Lt Col. Oswald Bissill Giles, of The Elms, Horncastle Road, Boston.
- 1952: Capt. Henry William Newman Fane
- 1953: Sir Oliver Charles Earle Welby
- 1954: Lt. Col. Sir Weston Cracroft-Amcotts, of Hackthorn Hall, Lincolnshire.
- 1955: Sir John Denton Marsden
- 1956: Ralph George Edward Jarvis
- 1957: Lt. Col. William Reeve, of Leadenham House
- 1958: Sir Denis Le Marchant
- 1959: Maj. Edmund Charles Reginald Sheffield
- 1960: John Richard Berge-Coupland
- 1961: Lt.Colonel Sir Hugh John Francis Sibthorpe Cholmeley
- 1962: Major Sir Henry Hawley, Bt.
- 1963: Capt. Edward Cawdron Cordeaux, then Capt. Henry Nicholas Nevile (later Sir Henry Nevile)
- 1964: Major John Pelham, Lord Worsley
- 1965: Lt. Cmdr. Geoffrey Weston Wells
- 1966: John Charles Peregrine Langton
- 1967: John Gerald Turton Eccles
- 1968: Capt. Sir Anthony Henry Thorold
- 1969: Capt. Jeremy Gervase Geoffrey Philip Elwes
- 1970: Lt. Col. Roger Sutton Nelthorpe
- 1971: Roland Cecil Bellamy, of Barnoldby-Le-Beck, Grimsby
- 1972: Capt. Philip Herbert Earle Welby-Everard
- 1973: Nicholas George Whichcote Playne
- 1974: Major General Sir Christopher E. Welby-Everard, of Sapperton, Sleaford
- 1975: Colonel Geoffrey Michael Sanders
- 1976: William Whitaker Maitland
- 1977: Sir James Benton Jones, of Grantham
- 1978: Edward John Peregrine Cust, of The Mill, Manthorpe, Grantham.
- 1979: Lt. Col. John Lindley Marmion Dymoke
- 1980: Peter Kirton Dennis, of Stenigot
- 1981: Julian Francis Fane, of Fulbeck Manor, Fulbeck, Grantham.
- 1982: Peter Edward Findlay Heneage, of North Carlton Old Hall, Lincoln.
- 1983: Peter William Fane, of Keepers Cottage, Aunby, Stamford
- 1984: Adrian Massingberd-Mumby
- 1985: Michael Worth, of Grantham
- 1986: Philip Gibbons, of Holton-Le-Moor
- 1987: Neil McCorquodale, of Stoke Rochford
- 1988: James Heneage, of Hainton
- 1989: Bridget Katharine Cracroft-Eley, of Hackthorn Hall, Lincoln
- 1990: Anthony James Longmore Worth.
- 1991: Henry Samuel Sharpley, of Bosworth
- 1992: John George Richardson, of Bitchfield
- 1993: Anthony Jarvis, of Doddington
- 1994: Simon Turner, of Folkingham
- 1995: David Kenneth Baker, of Gedney Dyke
- 1996: James Charles Stewart Reynolds Milligan-Manby, of Thorganby
- 1997: Sarah Louisa Mary, Lady Bruce-Gardyne, of The Old Rectory, Aswardby, Spilsby.
- 1998: Geordie Oliphant Hutchison, of Swallowfield House, Welby, Grantham.
- 1999: Francis John Fane Marmion Dymoke, of Scrivelsby Grange, Horncastle.

== 21st century ==
- 2000: Richard William Parker, of The Manor, Metheringham, Lincoln
- 2001: Clifford Graham Rowles Nicholson, of Temple Garth, Willoughton, Gainsborough.
- 2002: Charles Richard Ferens, of Casthorpe Lodge, Barrowby, Grantham.
- 2003: Paul Walter Reginald Pumfrey Stanway House, 11 Greetwell Road, Lincoln.
- 2004: Charles William Hodder Welby of Stroxton House, Grantham,
- 2005: Nigel Denis Spence Brown of The Old Rectory, Fulbeck, Grantham
- 2006: Roger James Douglas of Crosby, Market Rasen
- 2007: Patricia Jane Ware of Brant Broughton, Lincoln
- 2008: John William Lockwood of Cammeringham
- 2009: Lady Sarah McCorquodale of Stoke Rochford, Grantham
- 2010: John Arthur Cadas Godfrey, of Searby, Barnetby
- 2011: Robin Maxwell Battle of Moorlands, Branston
- 2012: John Bernard Burke of Knaith, Gainsborough
- 2013: Toby Edward Drake Dennis of Royston, Lincoln
- 2014: Charles Pelham, 8th Earl of Yarborough of Brocklesby Hall
- 2015: Air Vice-Marshal (Hector) Gavin Mackay of Wellingore, Lincoln
- 2016: Jill Gabriel Anne Mary Hughes of Aubourn, Lincoln
- 2017: Andrew Simon Clark of East Ravendale
- 2018: Ian Harrup Walter of Lincoln
- 2019: Robert William Day of Fulbeck, nr Grantham
- 2020: Michael John Scott of Sleaford
- 2021: Claire Victoria Birch of Lincoln
- 2022: Timothy Michael Strawson of Thoresway, Market Rasen
- 2023: Richard James Lake of Hallington, Louth
- 2024: Philip Henry Marmion Dymoke of Horncastle
- 2025: David Christopher Chambers, Market Rasen
- 2026: Susan Patricia Liburd, Lincoln
