= William Skinner (MP) =

William Skinner (28 May 1596 – 7 August 1627) was the member of Parliament for Great Grimsby in 1626.
