= Sir William Wray, 1st Baronet, of Ashby =

English politician

Sir William Wray, 1st Baronet, of Ashby (1625 – 17 October 1669) was an English politician who sat in the House of Commons at various times between 1645 and 1660.

Wray was the son of Sir Christopher Wray of Ashby, Lincolnshire, and his wife, Albinia Cecil, daughter of Edward Cecil, 1st Viscount Wimbledon. He was grandson of Sir William Wray, 1st Baronet, of Glentworth. He was admitted to Lincoln's Inn on 5 November 1638.

In the Civil War, his father raised a regiment in the Parliamentarian army and he may have served as a captain. He succeeded to the estates of Ashby on the death of his father in February 1645 and was travelling abroad later in the year when he was elected Member of Parliament for Great Grimsby as a recruiter to the Long Parliament. He was underage and it was said that at this time he "little minded anything except drinking and folly". He was excluded under Pride's Purge in 1648. He was elected MP for Grimsby again in 1654 for the First Protectorate Parliament and became deputy governor of Beaumaris Castle in the same year. He was elected MP for Grimsby again in 1656 for the Second Protectorate Parliament and in 1659 for the Third Protectorate Parliament.

In April 1660, Wray was elected again for Grimsby in the Convention Parliament by which time he was reckoned a Royalist. He was knighted on 6 June 1660 and was created a baronet (of Ashby) on 27 June 1660. He had an estate worth £3000 per annum. Wray died at the age of 43 and was buried at Ashby.

== Family ==
Wray married in or before 1652 Olympia Tufton, daughter of Sir Humfrey Tufton, 1st Baronet of the Mote, Maidstone and had 3 sons and 5 daughters. His son Christopher succeeded him to the baronetcy of Ashby. Sir Christopher also succeeded as 6th Baronet to the earlier Wray baronetcy of Glentworth following the death of Sir Bethell Wray, 5th Baronet without male issue in 1672.

Parliament of England
Preceded by Christopher Wray; Gervase Holles	Member of Parliament for Great Grimsby; 1645–1661; With: Edward Rossiter 1645; Edward Ayscough 1659; Edward King 1660	Succeeded by Adrian Scrope; Gervase Holles
Baronetage of England
New creation	Baronet (of Ashby); 1660–1669	Succeeded by Christopher Wray
