= Sir Christopher Wray, 6th Baronet =

English politician

Sir Christopher Wray, 2nd and 6th Baronet (1652–1679) was an English politician who sat in the House of Commons from 1675 to 1679.

Wray was the eldest son of Sir William Wray, 1st Baronet, of Ashby and his wife Olympia Tufton, daughter of Sir Humfrey Tufton, 1st Baronet of the Mote, Maidstone. He matriculated at University College, Oxford on 19 December 1668, aged 16. He succeeded as 2nd Baronet to the 1660 Baronetcy of Ashby on the death of his father on 17 October 1669, and as 6th Baronet to the 1611 Baronetcy of Glentworth on the death of his lunatic cousin Sir Bethell Wray in February 1672.

In 1675, he was elected Member of Parliament for Great Grimsby.

Wray died unmarried at the age of about 26 and was buried on 31 August 1679 at St. Giles' in the Fields, London, joining his brother Edward and their grandparents. He was succeeded by his brother William.

Parliament of England
Preceded by Gervase Holles; William Broxholme	Member of Parliament for Great Grimsby; 1675–1679; With: William Broxholme	Succeeded by William Broxholme; George Pelham
Baronetage of England
Preceded by Bethell Wray	Baronet (of Glentworth); 1672–1679	Succeeded by William Wray
Preceded by William Wray	Baronet (of Ashby); 1669–1679	Succeeded by William Wray
