= Archdeacon of Limerick =

Province of Dublin
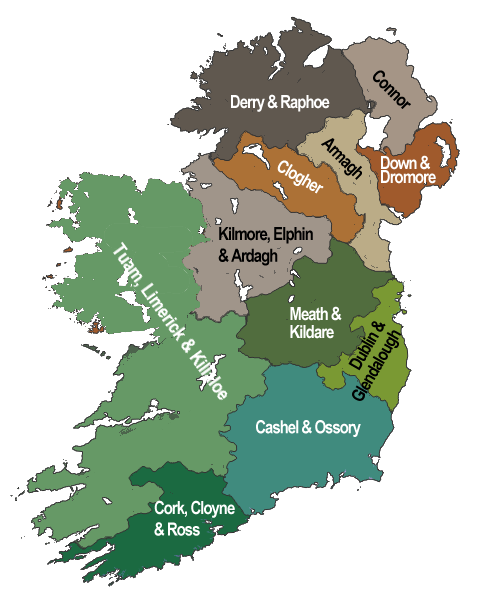
- Church: Church of Ireland
- Metropolitan bishop: Archbishop of Dublin
- Cathedral: Christ Church Cathedral, Dublin
- Dioceses: 5

The Archdeacon of Limerick was a senior ecclesiastical officer within the Diocese of Limerick (and later in the Church of Ireland) from the thirteenth century to the early twentieth. An early holder was Gerald Le Marescal who went on to be Bishop of the Diocese. The position is no longer used in the post Conciliar Church but it continues to exist in the Anglican diocese.
