= Betenson baronets =

Extinct baronetcy in the Baronetage of England

The Betenson Baronetcy, of Wimbledon in the County of Surrey, was a title in the Baronetage of England. It was created on 7 February 1663 for Sir Richard Betenson. He had been knighted in 1624 and served as High Sheriff of Surrey in 1645. In 1678 and 1679 he was High Sheriff of Kent at which time his seat was at Scadbury Manor, near Chislehurst, Kent. The second Baronet was his grandson Edward, High Sheriff of Kent in 1705. He was succeeded by his cousin Edward, (also a grandson of the first Baronet) whose seat was at Bradburn Place, Sevenoaks, Kent. His son Richard, succeeded as fourth Baronet but died without issue in 1786 when the baronetcy became extinct.

== Betenson baronets, of Wimbledon (1663) ==
- Sir Richard Betenson, 1st Baronet (1602–1679)
- Sir Edward Betenson, 2nd Baronet (1675–1733)
- Sir Edward Betenson, 3rd Baronet (1688–1762)
- Sir Richard Betenson, 4th Baronet (died 1786)
