= Ashby, Lincolnshire =

Suburb of Scunthorpe in Lincolnshire, England

Coordinates: 53.56°N 00.65°W

Ashby
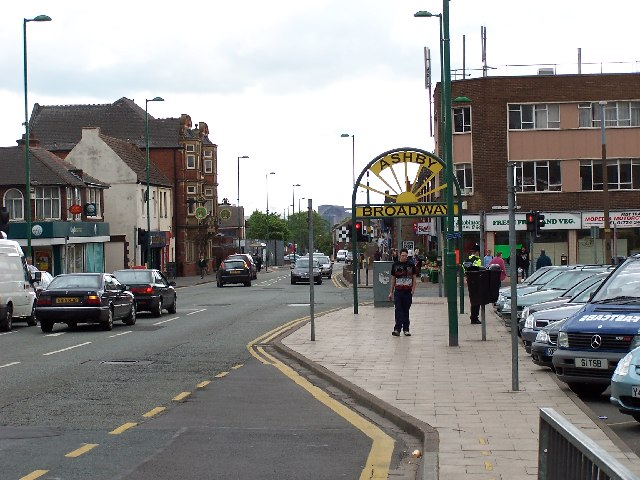
- Ashby Broadway. Facing East, the Crown Public House is on the right and in the distance the Steelworks

- Location within Lincolnshire
- OS grid reference: SE8908
  - London: 140 mi (230 km) S
- Unitary authority: North Lincolnshire
- Ceremonial county: Lincolnshire
- Region: Yorkshire and the Humber
- Country: England
- Sovereign state: United Kingdom
- Post town: Scunthorpe
- Postcode district: DN16, DN17
- Police: Humberside
- Fire: Humberside
- Ambulance: East Midlands

Ashby is a suburb of Scunthorpe, in the North Lincolnshire district, in the ceremonial county of Lincolnshire, England.

== Education ==
Grange Lane Junior School is located under the shadow of the Corus steel works. It is a mixed school, that educates around 250 pupils aged 7–11, in an area of relative disadvantage. The Headteacher is Mrs I Thorpe and there is a total of 11 teachers and 11 teaching assistants.

Francis James (Frank) Goodenough, who died on 30 January 2005, was Headmaster for 21 years, between 1973 and 1994.

== History ==
Ashby was formerly a township in the parish of Bottesford, in 1866 Ashby became a separate civil parish, on 1 October 1919 the parish was abolished to form "Scunthorpe and Frodingham" and Brumby Rural. In 1911, the parish had a population of 3237. From 1889 to 1974, it was in the administrative county of the Parts of Lindsey. From 1974 to 1996, it was in the county of Humberside. Until 1996, it was in Scunthorpe district.
