= Hussey =

Hussey is a surname. The surname is common in the British Isles, as well as locations associated with settlement by the people of these regions. The name has two main sources of origin. The first is of Norman origin, coming from the region of La Houssaye in Northern France. In Old French, the name relates to holly ('hous' in Old French). Hussey also has an Irish origin, stemming from the Ó hEodhasa family.

== Notable people ==
- Anna Maria Hussey (1805–1853), British mycologist, writer, and illustrator
- Arthur Hussey (1882–1915), American Olympic golfer
- Charles Henry Hussey (1832–1899), South Australia politician
- Charlotte Hussey (poet), Canadian poet
- Chris Hussey (born 1989), English professional footballer
- Christopher Hussey (1599–1686), early settler in New England
- Christopher Hussey (1899–1970), British architectural historian
- Cornelia Collins Hussey (1827–1902), American philanthropist, writer
- Curtis Hussey (born 1983), American professional wrestler
- David Hussey (born 1977), Australian cricketer
- Dyneley Hussey (1893–1972), British war poet and music critic
- Edward Hussey, various people, including

- Sir Edward Hussey, 1st Baronet (1585–1648), English politician
- Sir Edward Hussey, 3rd Baronet (c. 1662–1725), MP for Lincoln
- Edward Hussey-Montagu, 1st Earl Beaulieu (1721–1802), British peer and politician
- Edward Hussey (cricketer) (1749–1816), English cricketer and landowner

- Elizabeth Hussey, Baroness Hungerford (c. 1510–1554), English noblewoman
- Erastus Hussey (1800–1889), American abolitionist
- Ethan Hussey (born 2003), British middle-distance runner
- Frank Hussey (1905–1974), American athlete
- Giles Hussey (1710–1788), English painter
- Giles Hussey (born 1997), British tennis player
- Gemma Hussey (1938–2024), Irish politician
- George Frederick Hussey (1852–1935), South Australia politician
- Henry Hussey (disambiguation), various people, including

- Henry Hussey, 1st Baron Hussey (1265–1332), English soldier and politician
- Henry Hussey, 2nd Baron Hussey (1292–1349), English nobleman
- Baron Hussey, other nobles, including:

- Henry Hussey (1361–1409), MP for Sussex (UK Parliament constituency)
- Henry Hussey (died 1557), MP for New Shoreham, Lewes, Gatton and Horsham
- Henry Hussey (fl. 1529) (died 1541/44), MP for Horsham, England
- Henry Hussey (pastor) (1825–1903), printer, preacher and author in South Australia

- Joan M. Hussey (1907–2006), British historian
- John Hussey (disambiguation), multiple people
- Laurence Hussey (fl. 1550–1570), English lawyer and diplomat
- M. A. C. Hussey, American politician
- Marc Hussey (born 1974), Canadian ice hockey player
- Marcela Hussey (born 1967), Argentine field hockey player
- Marmaduke Hussey, Baron Hussey of North Bradley (1923–2006), BBC Chairman
- Mary Dudley Hussey (1853–1927), American lawyer, physician, and suffragist
- Matt Hussey (born 1979), American ice hockey player
- Michael Hussey (born 1975), Australian cricketer
- Natalia Hussey-Burdick (born 1989), American politician, Member of the Hawaii State House of Representatives
- Obed Hussey (1790–1860), American inventor
- Olivia Hussey (1951–2024), Argentine-British actress
- Percival Hussey (1869–1944), Australian cricketer
- Priscilla Hussey (1894–1946), American entomologist
- Richard Charles Hussey (1806–1887), British architect
- Ruth Hussey (1911–2005), American actress
- Susan Hussey, Baroness Hussey of North Bradley (born 1939), Woman of the Bedchamber to Queen Elizabeth II
- Thomas Hussey (disambiguation), various people, including

- Thomas Hussey (MP for Dorchester) (fl. 1395), English MP
- Thomas Hussey (died 1558) (by 1509–1558), MP for Great Grimsby, Grantham and Lincolnshire
- Thomas Hussey (died by 1576) (c. 1520–by 1576), English MP
- Thomas Hussey (died 1468), MP for Weymouth and Melcombe Regis, Great Bedwyn, Old Sarum and Dorset
- Sir Thomas Hussey, 2nd Baronet (1639–1706), English MP
- Thomas Hussey (Aylesbury MP) (1749–1824), English MP
- Thomas Hussey (Grantham MP) (died 1641), Royalist MP for Grantham, 1640–1641
- Thomas Hussey (Lyme Regis MP) (1814–1894), British MP for Lyme Regis, 1842–1847
- Thomas Hussey (MP for Whitchurch) (1597–1657), English merchant and MP at various times between 1645 and 1657
- Thomas Hussey (Irish politician) (born 1936), Fianna Fáil politician from County Galway in Ireland
- Thomas Hussey (bishop) (1746–1803), Irish diplomat, chaplain and bishop
- Thomas John Hussey (1792–c. 1854), English clergyman and astronomer

- Tom Hussey (1910–1982), Major League Baseball announcer
- Tom Hussey (photographer), American photographer
- Walter Hussey (1909–1985), British clergyman and patron of the arts
- Wayne Hussey (born 1958), British guitarist
- William Hussey (disambiguation), various people, including

- William Hussey (MP for Stamford) (died 1531), MP for Stamford
- William Hussey (died 1556), MP for Grantham
- William Hussey (died 1570) (1524–1570), MP for Scarborough
- William Hussey (English diplomat) (1642–1691), English ambassador to the Ottoman Empire
- William Hussey (died 1813) (1725–1813), MP for Hindon, Salisbury and St Germans
- William Hussey (astronomer) (1862–1926), American astronomer
- William Hussey (judge) (1443–1495), English Chief Justice
- William Hussey (writer), English children's author
- William Clive Hussey (1858–1923), British Army officer

== See also ==
- Hussey (crater), crater on Mars
- Hussie, author and artist, notably creator of Homestuck
