= Thomas Hussey =

Thomas Hussey may refer to:

== Politicians ==
- Thomas Hussey (MP for Dorchester) (fl. 1395), English MP
- Thomas Hussey (died 1558) (by 1509–1558), MP for Great Grimsby, Grantham and Lincolnshire
- Thomas Hussey (died by 1576) (c. 1520–by 1576), MP
- Thomas Hussey (died 1468), MP for Weymouth and Melcombe Regis, Great Bedwyn, Old Sarum and Dorset
- Sir Thomas Hussey, 2nd Baronet (1639–1706), English member of parliament
- Thomas Hussey (Aylesbury MP) (1749–1824), English MP
- Thomas Hussey (Grantham MP) (died 1641), Royalist Member of Parliament for Grantham, 1640–1641
- Thomas Hussey (Lyme Regis MP) (1814–1894), British Member of Parliament for Lyme Regis, 1842–1847
- Thomas Hussey (MP for Whitchurch) (1597–1657), English merchant and politician who sat in the House of Commons at various times between 1645 and 1657
- Thomas Hussey (Irish politician) (born 1936), former Fianna Fáil politician from County Galway in Ireland

== Others ==
- Thomas Hussey (bishop) (1746–1803), Irish diplomat, chaplain and bishop
- Thomas John Hussey (1792–c. 1854), English clergyman and astronomer
- Tom Hussey (1910–1982), Major League Baseball announcer
- Tom Hussey (photographer), American photographer
