= William Hussey =

William Hussey may refer to:

== Politicians ==
- William Hussey (MP for Stamford) (died 1531), MP for Stamford
- William Hussey (died 1556), MP for Grantham
- William Hussey (died 1570) (1524–1570), MP for Scarborough
- William Hussey (English diplomat) (1642–1691), English ambassador to the Ottoman Empire
- William Hussey (died 1813) (1725–1813), MP for Hindon, Salisbury and St Germans

== Others ==
- William Hussey (astronomer) (1862–1926), American astronomer
- William Hussey (judge) (1443–1495), English Chief Justice
- William Hussey (writer), English children's author
- William Clive Hussey (1858–1923), British Army officer

== See also ==
- William H. Huse (died 1888), American newspaper publisher and politician
