= Henry Hussey =

Henry Hussey may refer to:

- Henry Hussey (1361–1409), MP for Sussex
- Henry Hussey (died 1557), MP for New Shoreham, Lewes, Gatton and Horsham
- Henry Hussey (fl. 1529) (died 1541/44), MP for Horsham
- Henry Hussey (pastor) (1825–1903), printer, preacher and author in South Australia
- Several Barons Hussey:
  - Henry Hussey, 1st Baron Hussey (1265–1332), English soldier and politician
  - Henry Hussey, 2nd Baron Hussey (1292–1349), English nobleman
  - Henry Hussey, 3rd Baron Hussey (died 1349)
  - Henry Hussey, 4th Baron Hussey (died 1384)
  - Henry Hussey, 5th Baron Hussey (1362–1409)
  - Henry Hussey, 6th Baron Hussey (died 1460)
