= Mealsechlainn Ó hEodhasa =

Mealsechlainn Ó hEodhasa, Irish poet, died 1504.

Mealsechlainn was a brother of Ciothruaidh Ó hEodhasa, who died in 1518.

The Annals of the Four Masters record his death in 1504:

- Melaghlin, the son of Ahairne O'Hussey ... died.

== See also ==
- Aengus Ó hEodhasa, poet, died 1480.
- Giolla Brighde Ó hEoghusa, poet, 1608–1614.
- Gemma Hussey, Fine Gael TD and Minister, 1977–1989.
