= Ó hEodhasa =

Notable Irish last name now rendered as Hussey

Ó hEodhasa was the name of an Irish brehon family based in what is now County Fermanagh. The surname is now generally rendered as Hussey.

== See also ==
- Aengus Ó hEodhasa, poet, died 1480.
- Ciothruaidh Ó hEodhasa, poet, died 1518.
- Giolla Brighde Ó hEoghusa, poet, 1608–1614.
- Gemma Hussey, Fine Gael TD and Minister, 1977–1989. [She is only a Hussey by marriage]
