= Hissey =

Hissey is a surname. Notable people with the surname include:

- Jane Hissey (born 1952), English writer and illustrator
- Michael Hissey, Australian musician, educator, and conductor

== See also ==
- Hussey
