= John Hussey =

John Hussey may refer to:

- John Hussey (MP for Horsham and New Shoreham) (c.1520–c.1572), MP for Horsham and New Shoreham
- John Hussey, 1st Baron Hussey of Sleaford (1465/1466 – 1536/1537), Chief Butler of England
- John Hussey (American football official) (born c. 1964), American NFL official
- John E. Hussey (?–1922), African-American politician from North Carolina
