= Hussey baronets =

Extinct baronetcy in the Baronetage of England

There have been two baronetcies created for members of the Hussey family, both in the Baronetage of England. Both creations are extinct.

The Hussey Baronetcy, of Honington in the County of Huntingdon, was created in the Baronetage of England on 29 June 1611 for Edward Hussey, subsequently Member of Parliament for Lincolnshire. He was succeeded by his grandson, Thomas, the second Baronet, the eldest son of Thomas Hussey, eldest son of the first Baronet. Sir Thomas represented Lincoln and Lincolnshire in Parliament. He was succeeded by his cousin Sir Edward Hussey, 3rd Baronet, of Caythorpe (see below), who also represented Lincoln in Parliament. Both titles became extinct on the death of Sir Edward's younger son, Edward, the fifth Baronet, in 1734.

The Hussey Baronetcy, of Caythorpe in the County of Lincoln, was created in the Baronetage of England on 21 July 1661 for Charles Hussey, Member of Parliament for Lincolnshire. He was the third son of the first Baronet of Honington. His younger son, the aforementioned Sir Edward Hussey, 3rd Baronet, succeeded to the Hussey Baronetcy of Honington on the death of his cousin in 1706. See above for further history of the titles.

The Hussey family descended from Sir William Hussey, Lord Chief Justice of the King's Bench. His eldest son and heir John Hussey was summoned to Parliament as Baron Hussey of Sleaford in 1529. Sir William's second son Sir Robert Hussey of Halton in Lincolnshire was High Sheriff of Lincolnshire as was his son and heir Sir Charles Hussey, of Honington. Sir Charles's son was the first Baronet of Honington.

Sir William Hussey, second son of Thomas Hussey, was Ambassador to the Ottoman Empire.

== Hussey baronets, of Honington (1611) ==
- Sir Edward Hussey, 1st Baronet (1585–1648)
  - Thomas Hussey (died 1641)
- Sir Thomas Hussey, 2nd Baronet (1639–1706)
- Sir Edward Hussey, 3rd Baronet (c. 1661–1725)
- Sir Henry Hussey, 4th Baronet (c. 1702–1730)
- Sir Edward Hussey, 5th Baronet (died 1734)

== Hussey baronets, of Caythorpe (1661) ==
- Sir Charles Hussey, 1st Baronet (died 1664)
- Sir Charles Hussey, 2nd Baronet (died 1680)
- Sir Edward Hussey, 3rd Baronet (c. 1661–1725) (succeeded to the Hussey Baronetcy of Honington in 1706; see above for further succession)

Baronetage of England
Preceded by Carr baronets	Hussey baronets 29 June 1611	Succeeded by Mordaunt baronets
