= Lillian Mary Harris =

- Born: 8 December 1887; St Pancras, London, United Kingdom
- Died: 13 March 1964 (aged 76); Rochford, Essex, England, United Kingdom

Lillian Mary Harris (8 December 1887 – 13 March 1964), better known as Lillian Thring, was an English militant suffragette active in Australia and England from the early 20th century until a few years before her death in 1964.

== Biography ==
Lillian was born on Thursday 8 December 1887 in St Pancras, London, England. She was the eldest of seven children born to Benjamin Harris, a marine store keeper and Elizabeth Tasker who had married in Marylebone, Middlesex earlier that year.

In the early 20th century Lillian became an active member of the suffragette movement and also around this time she was working as a shop assistant in Selfridges in Oxford Street, London before moving to Australia in December 1911.

Lillian lived in Melbourne and also become a suffragette there, joining the Women's Political Association and the Industrial Workers of the World. Whilst in Australia she gained a reputation for being a brilliant public speaker and newspapers reported on her talk to a Socialist audience on 'White Slaves and Militant Suffragettes' at the Gaiety Theatre, Melbourne on 18 May 1913 Having moved back to England in 1915 Lillian joined the Women's Socialist Federation, which had been set up in 1914 as the East London Federation of Suffragettes by Sylvia Pankhurst, who was to become a friend. She married Cyril Guy Thring in 1913.

By 1918, Thring, as she liked to be known, had joined the North London Herald League and become active in the 'Hands off Russia' campaign as well as regularly giving talks on left platforms.

On 1 November 1920, she took a leading role in the occupation of Islington Library as part of the workers movement. Originally, the occupation had been agreed by the local authorities but all those involved had to be removed by Police when they refused to leave on the mayor's request on 16 November.

On 15 April 1921, a conference was called at the International Socialist Club, Hoxton to establish the National Unemployed Workers' Movement. The movement produced a fortnightly paper called 'Out of Work'; Lillian was the papers first editor. The paper had a readership of some 50,000.

Lillian was arrested and bound over in the sum of £5 to keep the peace on 4 October 1921 at a large demonstration concerning the unemployed.

In December 1921, Lillian was arrested again and charged for an article which had been printed in 'Out of Work' that allegedly attempted to cause disaffection amongst police officers in an effort to induce them to withhold their services. She was fined £10 and given 21 days in which to pay. Edward Froude, who had printed the paper, was bound over in £50. Lillian may have refused to pay this fine and was sent to Holloway to pay of the debt

Militant activity on behalf of the unemployed grew in the early 1920s and Lillian was highly active at this time. A small group, of which Lillian was a member, occupied a piano factory in St Pancras to persuade the workers to refuse to work overtime and to force the management to give them a wage increase. These sorts of occupations had become very common at the time.

By the summer of 1921, Lillian was gaining publicity in the national and London press as 'Red Rosa', the 'mystery women with hypnotic eyes that was behind the unemployment agitation'.

By August 1922, Lillian was living on Huntingdon Street, Caledonian Road in Islington. A police raid on this address found two German machine guns for which Lillian was arrested and taken into custody, but later acquitted. Whilst she was being held in custody, the headquarters of the Finsbury unemployed was renamed 'Thring Hall' in her honour.

Around 1925, Lillian had moved to Battersea and during the 1926 General Strike was a member of the Battersea Council for Action.

By 1927, Lillian and her husband Robert were living in Sonderburg Road, Islington and she had now become involved in the Women's Co-operative Guild as well as continuing her work with the unemployed.

From the 1930s, Lillian was active in anti-Fascist politics in North London. She was also involved in union organising, especially amongst female shop workers.

When the Second World War broke out, to which she was politically opposed, she helped men on the run from conscription. During the War, Lillian fell out with her son Cyril as he was working with British Intelligence at the time.

By the end of the war, Lillian was a supporter of the local squatters movement and became the secretary of the Rochford branch of the Agricultural Worker's Union which became a strong force in the area with her help.

== Political activity ==
In 1920, she became a foundation member of the Islington Branch of the Communist Party but left in 1923 as she no longer agreed with it policies and attitudes.

In October 1922, Lillian became a sub-agent for Shapurji Saklatvala, a member of the British Communist Party, who successfully stood with the backing of the Labour Party in Battersea North. Saklatvala was born in India in 1874 and was only the third Indian to become an MP in the Parliament of the United Kingdom.

Lillian carried on her political work during the 1924 general election and was heavily involved in the July 1924 by-election in the Abbey division of Westminster supporting Fenner Brockway against Winston Churchill who stood as an independent anti-Socialist. The official Conservative candidate won by a narrow margin over Churchill but Brockway's large Socialist vote in Westminster caused a considerable sensation.

Lillian's political activities attracted the attention of the Westminster Labour Party who asked her to stand as their parliamentary candidate which she refused, as she did will all subsequent offers from them.

During the late 1940s until 1948, Lillian was an Independent Labour Party Councillor but joined the Official Labour Party in 1950.

== Personal life ==
Whilst in Australia, Lillian met Cyril Guy Thring. Cyril was born on 10 February 1888 in Natal, South Africa to English parents. The two of them moved to Sudan in 1913 where Cyril worked as a postal official. They were married on 12 July 1913 in Khartoum. Later that year she gave birth to their only child, whose name was also Cyril. When Lillian returned to England in 1915 with her husband and their son, she was pregnant with their second child, which she lost.

Cyril, Lillian's husband, died on 8 May 1917, back in Sudan at the relatively young age of 29.

Around 1920, Lillian met Arthur Miller and they had a daughter born in 1921.

In 1925 Lillian married Robert Harvey in Marylebone, Middlesex. Robert was born in Shoreditch, Middlesex in 1881. In 1929, Lillian gave birth to her third child, Rhona, in Islington, Middlesex.

Lillian would often go under her husband's name of Harvey as but also used the aliases Thurston and Martin.

Around 1935, Lillian left Robert and moved to Ashingdon near Rochford, Essex with her companion George Tasker, who was a men's hairdresser and a member of the Independent Labour Party.

== Death ==
For the last three years of her life, Lillian was bedridden, she died on 13 March 1964 in Rochford.

== See also ==
- History of feminism
- List of suffragists and suffragettes
- Suffragette
- Women's Social and Political Union
- Women's suffrage
- Women's suffrage in the United Kingdom
- Communism
