= Ciothruaidh Ó hEodhasa =

Irish poet

Ciothruaidh Ó hEodhasa (died 1518) was an Irish poet. Ó hEodhasa was a member of a Brehon family of County Fermanagh. Under the year 1518, the Annals of the Four Masters record his death: "O'Hosey (Ciothruaidh, the son of Athairne), a learned poet, who kept a house of general hospitality, died."

== See also ==
- Aengus Ó hEodhasa, poet, died 1480.
- Mealsechlainn Ó hEodhasa, died 1504.
- Giolla Brighde Ó hEoghusa, poet, 1608–1614.
- Gemma Hussey, Fine Gael TD and Minister, 1977–1989.
