= Edward Hussey =

Edward Hussey may refer to:

- Sir Edward Hussey, 1st Baronet (1585–1648), English politician
- Sir Edward Hussey, 3rd Baronet (c. 1662–1725), MP for Lincoln
- Edward Hussey-Montagu, 1st Earl Beaulieu (1721–1802), British peer and politician
- Sir Edward Hussey, 5th Baronet (died 1734), of the Hussey baronets
- Edward Hussey (cricketer) (1749–1816), English cricketer and landowner
