= Aengus Ó hEodhasa =

Irish poet (d. 1480)

Aengus Ó hEodhasa, Irish poet, died 1480.

Ó hEodhasa was a member of a brehon family based in County Fermanagh. The Annals of the Four Masters record his death in 1480, stating Ua h-Eodhosa, .i. Aongus mac Seain saoí fhir dhána ... d'écc./O'Hosey, i.e. Aengus, the son of John, a learned poet ... died.

== See also ==
- Ciothruaidh Ó hEodhasa, poet, died 1518.
- Giolla Brighde Ó hEoghusa, poet, 1608–1614.
- Gemma Hussey, Fine Gael TD and Minister, 1977–1989.
