= Edward Dashwood Haggitt =

UK army officer

- Born: Little Whelnetham Hall
- Died: 6 April 1958; London
- Burial place: Little Whelnetham
- Military career
- Allegiance: United Kingdom
- Branch: British Army
- Service years: 1883–1903
- Rank: Major
- Unit: Royal Engineers
- Awards: Officer of the British Empire
- Other work: Bailiff of The Royal Parks

Major Edward Dashwood Haggitt, OBE (died 6 April 1958) was a British Army officer who was bailiff of The Royal Parks from 1923.

== Biography ==
Haggitt was born in Little Whelnetham Hall.

Haggitt entered the army with commission as a lieutenant in the Royal Engineers on 14 February 1883. Promoted to captain on 16 September 1891, he served in British India in the 1891 Miranzai expedition. He saw active service in South Africa during the Second Boer War 1899-1902, where he was present at the battles of Paardeberg (February 1900), Driefontein (March 1900), Fouriesberg, Bethlehem and Wittebergen (July 1900). He was promoted to the substantive rank of major on 1 April 1900 while in South Africa, was mentioned in despatches and received the Queen's South Africa Medal and King's South Africa Medal. He retired from the Royal Engineers in 1903.

He later served in World War I, and was appointed an Officer of the Order of the British Empire (OBE) in 1919.

He was appointed bailiff of The Royal Parks in 1923, and served as such in the following years. The bailiff of the Royal Parks was responsible for the overall management of the royal parks of London, lands originally owned by the monarchy and officially designated public parks with the introduction of the Crown lands Act 1851. Among other duties, he was in charge of the keepers and civil officers in the parks, and he lived in a house inside Hyde Park.

Government offices
| Preceded by William Clive Hussey | Bailiff of the Royal Parks; 1923– | Succeeded by |
