= Moreton John Wheatley =

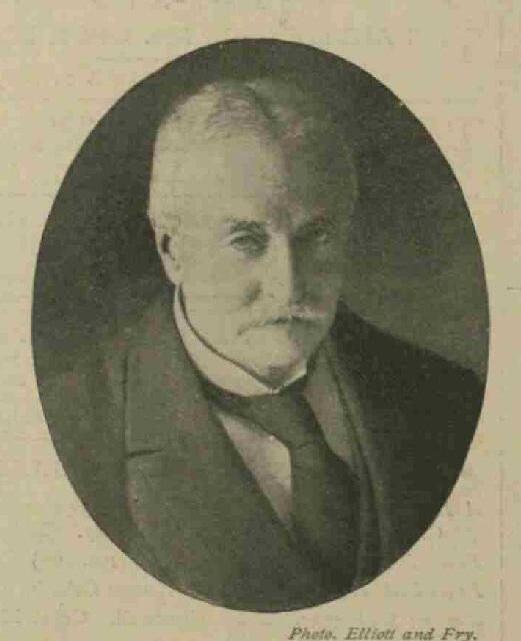
- Born: 2 March 1837
- Died: 13 May 1916 (aged 79)
- Military career
- Allegiance: United Kingdom
- Branch: British Army
- Service years: 1854–1885
- Rank: Colonel
- Unit: Royal Engineers
- Awards: Companion of the Order of the Bath
- Other work: Bailiff of The Royal Parks

Colonel Moreton John Wheatley CB (2 March 1837 – 13 May 1916) was a British Army officer who was Bailiff of the Royal Parks from 1879 to 1902.

== Biography ==
Wheatley was born in 1837, the elder son of Thomas Randall Wheatley (c. 1799–1879) and Eliza Wheatley, of Gwersyllt park, Denbighshire. His father had served in the Madras Civil Service, but was from a military family, the son of Major-General William Wheatley, of the Grenadier Guards. Lieutenant-Colonel Charles Robertson Eliott Wheatley (1851–1913), of the Royal Artillery (Madras), and Lieutenant-Colonel W. F. Wheatley were younger brothers.

He entered the army as a second-lieutenant in the Royal Engineers on 20 December 1854, and was promoted to lieutenant the following month, on 13 January 1855. In 1856 he served in the Crimean War. Following appointment as adjutant on the staff of the Royal Engineers establishment at Chatham, he was promoted to captain on 18 December 1861. He received the brevet rank of major before 1864, was promoted to the substantive rank of major on 5 July 1872, and lieutenant-colonel on 12 October 1879. Following promotion to colonel on 12 October 1883, he retired from active service in 1885.

He was appointed Bailiff of the Royal Parks in 1879, and served as such until he retired on reaching the age limit in March 1902. The Bailiff of the Royal Parks was responsible for the overall management of the Royal Parks of London, lands originally owned by the monarchy and officially designated public parks with the introduction of the Crown lands Act 1851. Among other duties, he was in charge of the keepers and civil officers in the parks, and he lived in a house inside Hyde Park.

Shortly before his retirement as Bailiff, he was appointed a Companion (civil) of the Order of the Bath (CB) in the November 1901 Birthday Honours list, and invested by King Edward VII on 17 December 1901.

He lived at Gwersyllt in Denbighshire, and died on 13 May 1916.

== Family ==
Wheatley married, in 1864, Edith Frances Millett, younger daughter of Charles Millett, of Maiden Erlegh, Berkshire. They had three sons and one daughter, including:

- Major Cyril Moreton Wheatley, DSO (1870–1942), of the Essex Regiment
- Mabel Edith Moreton Wheatley, who married Brigadier-General Richard Francis Johnson, CB, CMG, CBE (1852–1938), of the Royal Artillery.

Government offices
Preceded by	Bailiff of the Royal Parks; 1879–1902	Succeeded by William Clive Hussey
