= Edmondsham House =

Listed country house in Dorset, England

Coordinates: 50°54′14″N 1°54′50″W

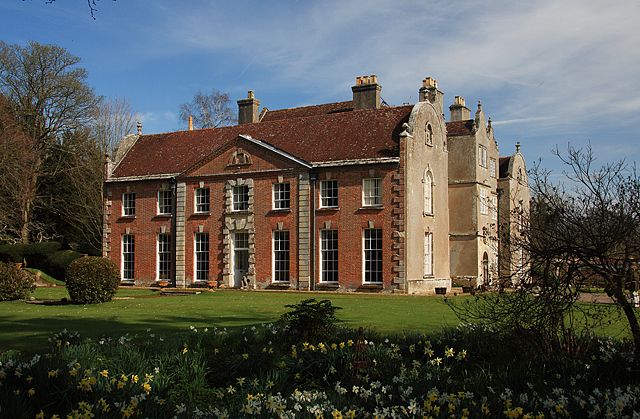
Edmondsham House

Edmondsham House is an English country house in Edmondsham near Wimborne Minster in Dorset, England. The house is Tudor with Georgian additions and is a Grade II* listed building.

The house, garden and park are open to the public on nominated days.

A nursery exists on the wider estate.

== History ==
The house was finished in 1598 for Thomas Hussey; but started by Roger Hussey married to Elizabeth Tregonwell in 1589. The stonework was by the Arnold family of 3 plus builders, and used locally made bricks to create a Dutch brick-style residence.

== Entrances ==
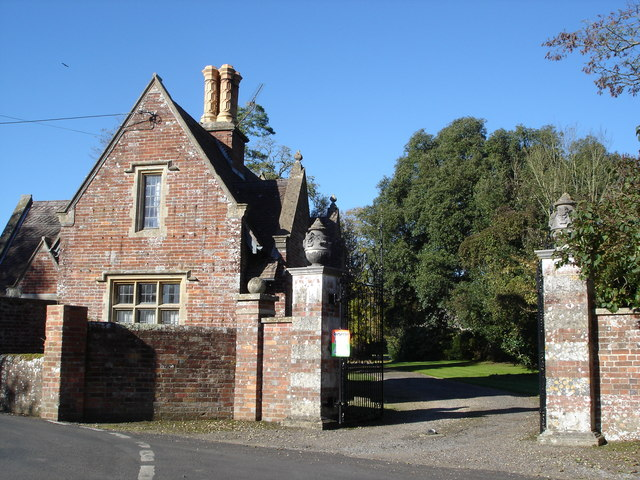
The gatehouse at the main (south) entrance

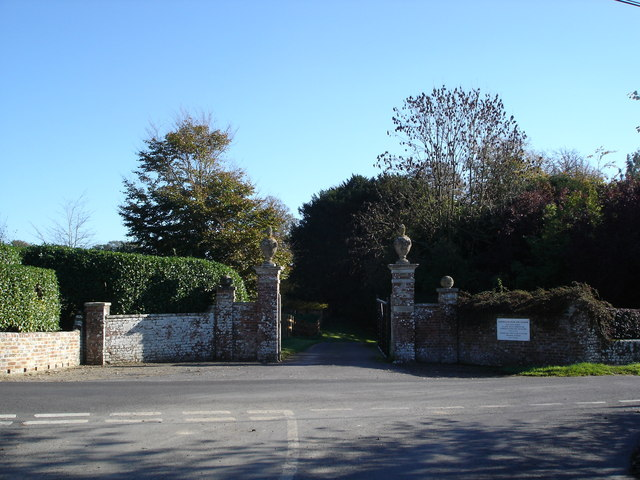
The west entrance

== Exterior views ==
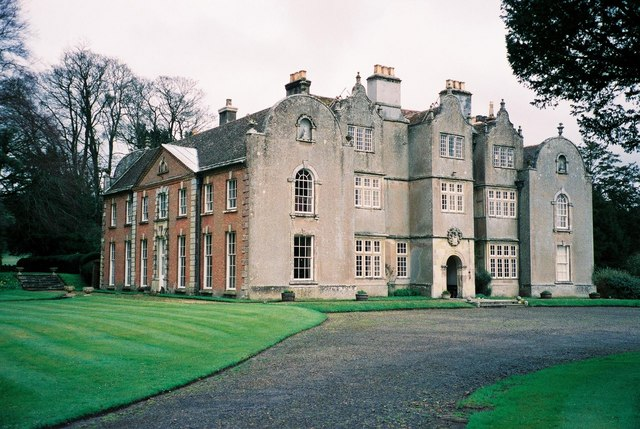
East elevation

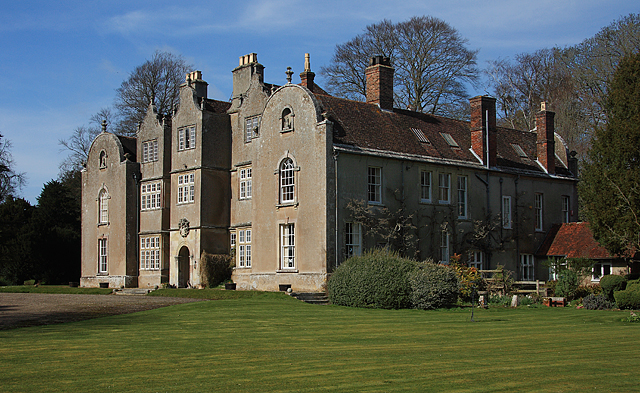
Rear of the property
