= M. A. C. Hussey =

American politician from Mississippi

McCron Avondale Cook Hussey (19 May 1840 – 9 May 1929) was an American politician from Natchez, Mississippi.

He was a Circuit Court Clerk in 1869 and 1871. In 1871 he was also an Alderman in Natchez.

In 1872 he was one of the incorporators of the Natchez and Brookhaven Railroad Company. He was an officer of the Natchez Pythian Lodge which was a Masonic lodge instituted August 7, 1872. In the same year he was also the President of the newly formed Natchez Typographical Union No. 152.

In 1873 he was a Circuit Court Clerk, served as the Secretary of the County School Board and was a member of the City School Board.

In 1874 he was Circuit Court Clerk and a City School Trustee.

He represented Adams County, Mississippi, along with Henry P. Jacobs and Fred Parsons, in the Mississippi House of Representatives in 1876 and 1877. He was elected as a Fusionist candidate and was described as a white moderate. He later switched to the Democratic Party.
