= Women's Political Association =

Irish feminist organisation

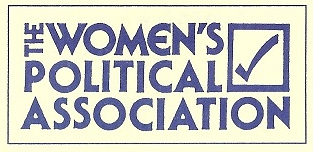
- Abbreviation: WPA
- Formation: 1971
- Dissolved: c. 1985; 41 years ago
- Location: Ireland
- Key people: Nuala Fennell; Gemma Hussey; Mary Robinson
- Formerly called: Women’s Progressive Association

The Women's Political Association (WPA) was an Irish feminist organisation created in the early 1970s, during a time when women in Ireland were largely excluded from public office and faced widespread gender discrimination. The Irish government's Commission on the Status of Women had just published a report in 1973, which exposed issues such as pay inequality, discrimination in family law, and barriers to education and employment in Ireland.

In response to these developments, the WPA was founded in 1973 by politically active women, including Gemma Hussey and Nuala Fennell. The organisation was non-partisan and focused on increasing women's representation in Irish politics. It sought to influence public opinion on the importance of gender balance and pressured political parties to recruit women candidates. The WPA's formation came amid a wave of social change, including the repeal of the marriage bar in 1973, and played a key role in advancing women's participation in politics and shaping Ireland's political landscape in the 1970s and 1980s. In 1990, former WPA President Mary Robinson became President of Ireland and thereafter transformed the office, something the founders of the WPA considered the culmination of their efforts.

== History ==
=== Origins ===
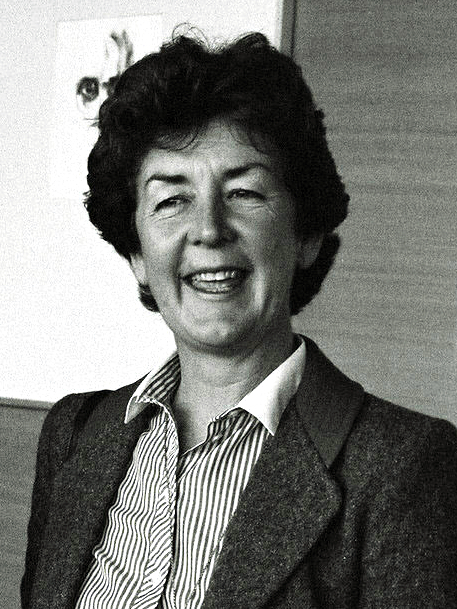
WPA co-founder Nuala Fennell in 1983.

The Women's Political Association arose in early 1970s Ireland amid growing discontent at women's near-absence from public office. In the 1973 Irish general election, for example, only four women TDs were elected (Note: The four women elected in 1973 were: Celia Lynch, first elected in 1954 upon the death of her husband James B. Lynch TD; Eileen Desmond, first elected in 1955 after the death of her husband Dan Desmond TD; Joan Burke, first elected in 1964 after the death of her husband James Burke TD; Brigid Hogan-O'Higgins, the daughter of former minister Patrick Hogan TD and wife of Michael O'Higgins TD.) and all of them were “the widows and the daughters of heroes” (as the WPA put it) rather than women elected on their own merits. At the same time, the government's Commission on the Status of Women (1969–73) had just reported on widespread gender discrimination in law, employment and social life. Its publication in May 1973 led to the Council for the Status of Women pressing for change. This climate set the scene for a new group aimed specifically at boosting women's representation in politics. In 1970–71 Margaret Waugh (a Limerick councillor) and others founded what was first called the Women's Progressive Association, soon renamed the Women's Political Association. The WPA was non‑partisan and explicitly focused on “influencing public opinion on the importance of gender balance” and pressuring parties to recruit women. The association was officially formed in the early 1970s (c.1973) and set up local branches around the country to encourage women to stand for election.

Mary Bourke, later known as Mary Robinson, was the WPA's first president.

Between 1970 and 1973, the Commission on the Status of Women, led by Thekla Beere, held hearings on the barriers facing women and, in 1973, published 49 recommendations on issues like pay, family law, and education. In response, the Council for the Status of Women was formed to lobby the government to implement these recommendations. Meanwhile, the Irish Women's Liberation Movement (IWLM), which had been founded in 1970, carried out high-profile protests such as the 1971 Contraceptive Train to Belfast, which focused on contraception and marriage law and raised public awareness of women's issues. In 1973, the Women's Political Association held its inaugural meetings, with Gemma Hussey being elected chair in the same year that Ireland outlawed the marriage bar on women in public service. By 1975, which was declared the UN International Women's Year, the women's movement mobilised nationally, and Irish Women United (IWU), a radical offshoot of the IWLM, was founded in April. Amidst this ferment, the WPA solidified its role as the first Irish group dedicated to getting women into public office.

=== Founders and Leadership ===
The WPA was spearheaded by a small group of politically active women. Gemma Hussey (née Moran, b.1938) was its most prominent leader. A Bray-born businesswoman and lifelong liberal feminist, Hussey became WPA Chair in 1973. Another key founder was Nuala Fennell, a solicitor. Fennell had also been active in Action, Information and Motivation (AIM), set up in 1972 to assist deserted wives, and helped launch the WPA alongside Hussey. Many of these women worked in voluntary branches around Ireland. The WPA had no formal party affiliation; it drew support from women across the political spectrum who shared the goal of greater gender balance in public life. The association operated via an unpaid committee and local volunteers, relying on grassroots outreach rather than major funding.

=== Influence on Irish Politics and Women’s Rights ===
Though the WPA never elected a candidate directly, it influenced the political agenda and women's participation. The group's high-profile slogans and campaigns helped keep gender representation in the media and on party platforms. For example, during the 1977 general election, the WPA launched the “Why Not a Woman?” and “Who’s Your Woman?” campaigns. These posters and stickers urged voters to support female candidates. The campaign coincided with parties nominating more women: for example, Mary Harney and Máire Geoghegan-Quinn for Fianna Fáil and Senator Mary Robinson ran for Labour. Although many of these women were unsuccessful in 1977, the publicity had an impact: first-preference votes for women candidates doubled that year, signalling a shift in public attitudes.

The 1977 Irish general election stands out as a success for the WPA: With WPA support, the women's vote share doubled, which led to the election of six women TDs in 1977, including newcomers Kit Ahern, Eileen Lemass and Síle de Valera of Fianna Fáil. While not all of these women were directly endorsed by the WPA, the association played a major role in the election. One irony of the election was that one of the few women elected, Kit Ahern, was highly conservative on women's issues. Ahern opposed contraception, divorce and even annulment of marriage. Ahern opposed the creation of crèches for women in politics, and instead advocated that women should give up politics to become full-time mothers if they became pregnant. Following a report by the Commission on the Status of Women in 1973, Ahern remarked "I have very decided ideas of women's role in life and in my own county the women are doing a great job of work in the keeping their going and directing and bring up their families. This, I think, is what almighty God intended them to do".

The WPA also engaged directly with the political process. In 1976–77 it sent questionnaires to all Dáil deputies asking their positions on issues affecting women; the results were distributed to WPA members so voters could make informed choices. Internally, WPA branches sent press releases and held public meetings. For instance, WPA vice-chair Gemma Hussey spoke on topics like nepotism at events in Shannon and Sutton in 1977–78. Through its delegate seats on the Council for the Status of Women, the WPA pressed the government to implement the commission's recommendations. Over time, the WPA's activism helped change party behaviour. By the early 1980s, the proportion of women in the Dáil had risen significantly; In 1981 eleven women TDs were elected, rising to fourteen in 1982.

Two of those were former WPA activists: Nuala Fennell (elected 1981) and Gemma Hussey (elected 1982). Sensing the “political importance of the women’s vote,” Taoiseach Garret FitzGerald of Fine Gael appointed Fennell Minister of State for Women's Affairs in 1982. As Minister of State for Women's Affairs (MSWA), Fennell focused on reforms to family law, securing significant legal changes. Among these were laws preventing the sale of the family home without the consent of both spouses and legislation requiring fathers to provide financial support to their spouses and children. She also introduced the Status of Children Act, which removed legal distinctions between children born within and outside of marriage. In 1985, the MSWA produced a baseline report on the status of Irish women titled Irish Women: Agenda for Practical Action, which served both as Ireland's report for the UN Decade for Women and as a national political action plan.

The WPA also focused on voter education by publishing pamphlets like a Guide for Women Voters and using questionnaires to engage the electorate. The aim was to help ordinary women get involved in the political process for the first time. In 1979, WPA members co-founded the National Women's Talent Bank, a register of qualified women for public boards and commissions. This initiative aimed to ensure that more women were considered for appointments to such bodies.

As part of the Council for the Status of Women, WPA members helped secure legal changes recommended by the commission, such as equal pay laws and the repeal of the marriage bar. Gemma Hussey, while serving as a Senator, introduced a private member's bill on rape (including marital rape) in 1980. These actions, influenced by WPA ideals, put women's rights on the legislative agenda. The WPA also played a role in normalising women in leadership roles. Its spokespeople were frequently featured in the press and on radio, highlighting the important work women were doing in their homes and communities.

=== Decline and Disbandment ===
After the early 1980s, the WPA's presence diminished. The organisation operated during the 1970s and 1980s, but there are few records of it after the mid-1980s. Several factors contributed: its key leaders entered formal politics or other movements (Hussey and Fennell were in the Oireachtas; others focused on EU work).

By the mid-1980s, women's representation in the Oireachtas had mushroomed, with the 22nd Dáil featuring 13 women TDs while the 17th Seanad featured 7 women senators.

By 1987, the Fine Gael–Labour government had already abolished the separate Women's Affairs role (once held by Fennell) and folded its work into other departments. Meanwhile, new institutions like the Joint Oireachtas Committee on Women's Rights (formed 1983) and the National Women's Council of Ireland (previously known as the Council for the Status of Women) became focal points.

== Legacy ==
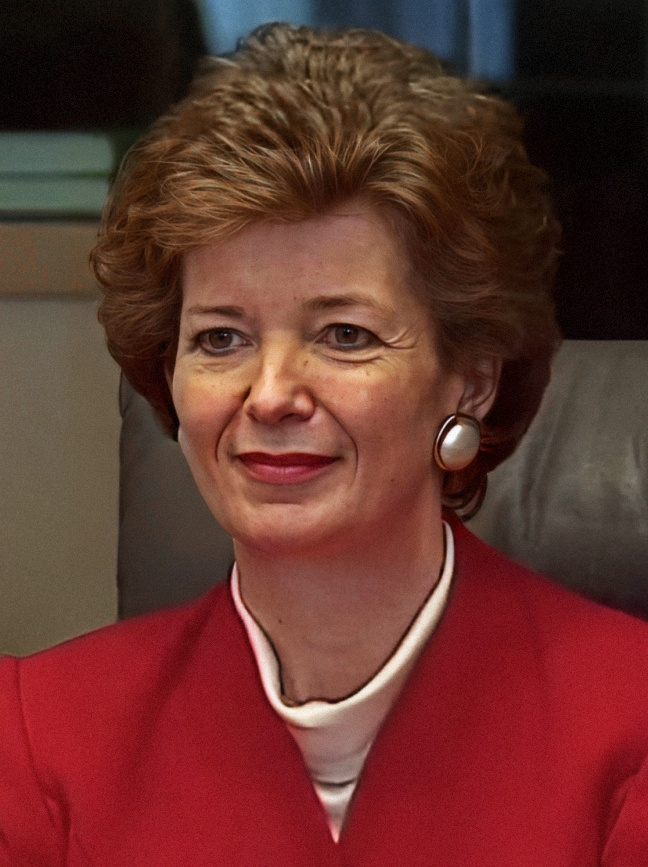
Former WPA President Mary Robinson became President of Ireland in 1990.

In the 1990 Irish presidential election, former WPA President Mary Robinson was victorious against the odds. Of the course of her presidency, she transformed and empowered the role of President of Ireland. Writing in 2008, Nuala Fennell stated that many of the WPA founders saw Robinson's presidency as the culmination of their efforts.
