= Thomas Hussey (MP for Dorchester) =

English politician

Thomas Hussey (fl. 1395), of North Bowood, Dorset, was an English politician.

He was a Member (MP) of the Parliament of England for Dorchester in 1395. His son, Thomas, was also an MP.
