= John E. Hussey =

North Carolina state legislator (died 1922)

John E. Hussey (died November 22, 1922) was a grocer, boardinghouse owner, and state legislator in North Carolina. He was African-American and represented Craven County in the North Carolina House of Representatives from 1885 to 1889.

== Life and career ==
Hussey owned a grocery store and boardinghouse in New Bern, North Carolina. He was elected to the legislature in the 1884 election as a Republican. The election marked the first time in ten years that Craven County had been represented solely by African-American delegates.

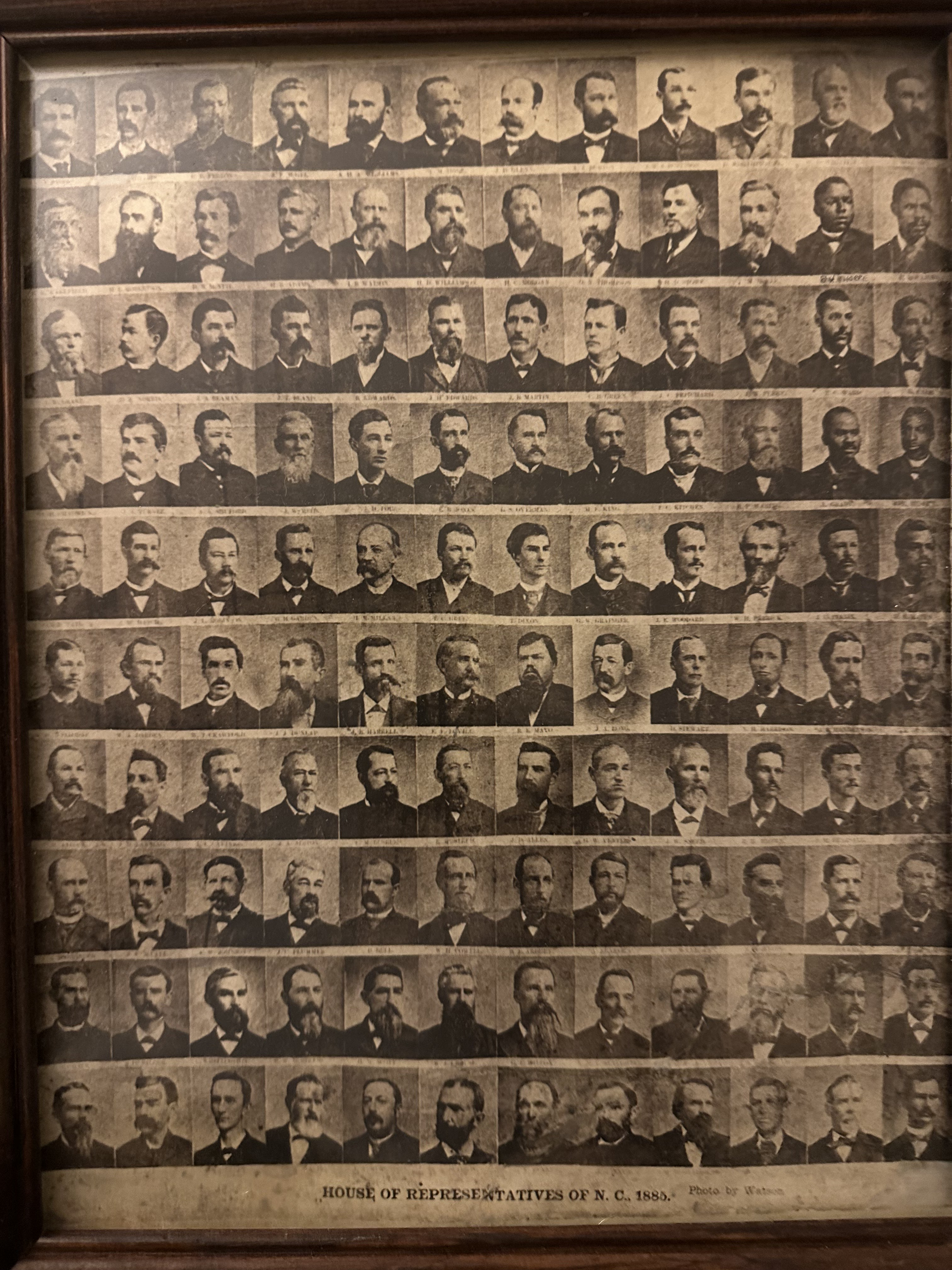
Members of the North Carolina House of Representatives in 1885

His re-election in 1886 attracted controversy, as two competing election certificates were presented on swearing-in day on January 11, 1887. W. B. Lane, a Democrat, was declared the winner of the race by the Craven County canvassers, however, the county sheriff presented a competing certificate declaring Hussey the winner. Lane was named the temporary representative while the House investigated the results. Later that month, the committee on privileges and elections submitted a report declaring that Hussey was entitled to the seat.

Ultimately, two competing reports were presented - the Democrats claimed that voter intimidation had scared many likely voters away from the polls, while the Republicans claimed that there was no violence and that Hussey had been elected unanimously. He was sworn into office and replaced Lane on January 26, 1887.

Hussey was a delegate to the 1896 North Carolina Republican convention. Later in his life, he became an ordained reverend. Hussey died on November 22, 1922, in New Bern.
