= Nuala Fennell =

Irish politician (1935–2009)

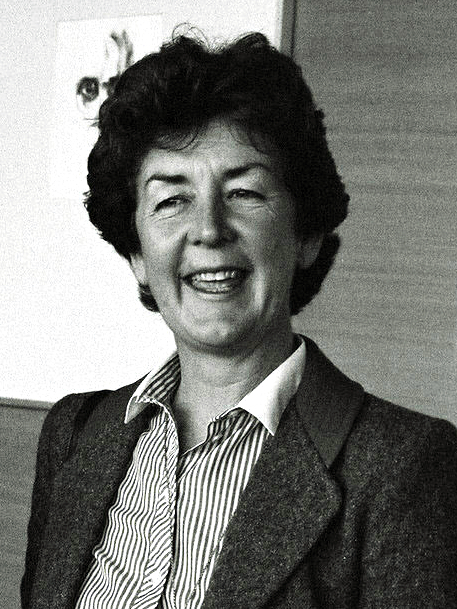
- Fennell in 1983

Minister of State
- 1983–1987: Justice
- 1982–1987: Taoiseach

Teachta Dála
- In office June 1989 – November 1992
- In office June 1981 – February 1987
- Constituency: Dublin South

Senator
- In office 25 April 1987 – 15 June 1989
- Constituency: Labour Panel
- In office 20 February 1987 – 25 April 1987
- Constituency: Nominated by the Taoiseach

Personal details
- Born: Fionnuala Campbell; 25 November 1935 Dublin, Ireland
- Died: 11 August 2009 (aged 73) Dublin, Ireland
- Party: Fine Gael
- Spouse: Brian Fennell (m. 1958)
- Children: 3
- Education: Trinity College Dublin

Nuala Fennell (née Campbell; 25 November 1935 – 11 August 2009) was an Irish Fine Gael politician and feminist activist. In the 1970s, Fennell became a significant figure in Ireland's women's movement, co-founding various organisations advocating for women's rights, including the Women's Political Association and Action, Information and Motivation (AIM). Fennell played a pivotal role in the establishment of Ireland's first women's refuge and was a strong advocate for legal reforms concerning family law and women's equality. In 1981, she became Fine Gael Teachta Dála (TD) for the Dublin South, a seat she would hold until 1987 and regain from 1989 to 1992. She also served as a Senator from 1987 to 1989.

During her time as a TD, she held the position of Minister of State for Women's Affairs and Family Law. Throughout her career, Fennell was known for her pragmatic approach to political change, striving for legislative progress to improve women's rights in Ireland. Her achievements during her time as a Minister of State include abolishing the legal status of illegitimacy in Ireland. A firm advocate for the legalisation of divorce, she campaigned heavily in the 1986 referendum on Divorce but was unable to win over the public.

== Early life ==
Born Fionnuala Campbell in north County Dublin on 25 November 1935, the third eldest child of Patrick Campbell, from the rural east County Galway area of Lisheennavannoge, one of the earliest Garda recruits, and his wife Elizabeth (née Roberts), from Glasnevin, Dublin. Fennell had two sisters and three brothers. She met her future husband, Brian Fennell, at the Templeogue Tennis Club, and they emigrated in 1957 to Montreal, Canada, where they were both employed by the Sun Life Company. The couple returned to Dublin and were married in 1958. Fennell took up secretarial employment in a legal firm in Dublin, at a time when married women were frowned upon for working. The couple had three children.

== Activist ==
In 1970, Nuala Fennell began writing articles on marriage, careers, and education for women. Her work appeared in the women's pages of the Irish Press and Evening Press, and she also contributed features for RTÉ. Through this work, she came into contact with a group of feminist journalists, including Mary Kenny, Mary McCutchan, Mary Anderson, Nell McCafferty and June Levine. Encouraged by Kenny, Fennell joined the newly founded Irish Women's Liberation Movement (IWLM) later that year.

The IWLM's manifesto, Chains or Change?: the civil wrongs of Irish women (1971), highlighted the discrimination faced by women under the Irish constitution and had a significant impact on Fennell. However, internal divisions soon emerged within the IWLM. Following the departure of Mary Kenny to London, Fennell became disillusioned with the organisation, viewing it as increasingly left-wing and confrontational. Fennell was critical of the anti-male rhetoric espoused by some of her new mentors, viewing the contraceptive train protest as histrionic, and saw herself as a social reformer focused on addressing political institutions rather than engaging in public demonstrations. She resigned from the IWLM in October 1971, issuing a public resignation letter condemning "the elitist and intolerant group that is using women’s liberation as a pseudo-respectable front for their own various political ends, ranging from opposition to the Forcible Entry Bill to free sedatives for neurotic elephants".

It was also in 1971 that Fennell co-founded the Women's Political Association, a non-partisan organisation focused on increasing women's representation in Irish politics.

After leaving the IWLM, Fennell was contacted by Dana Davis, editor of Woman’s Choice magazine. Together, they organised a meeting with Deirdre McDevitt, Bernadette Quinn, Máire Humphreys, Joan O'Brien, and Anne McAllister. From this meeting, Action, Information and Motivation (AIM) was established, a pressure group campaigning for women's equality in marriage. AIM was formally launched on 11 January 1972 at Brian Fennell's office on Clarendon Street, Dublin. At a time when Irish women had limited legal protection in marriage, AIM campaigned on four key issues: enforceable maintenance, equal rights to the family home, attachment of earnings, and access to free legal aid.

The general election of 1973 brought a Fine Gael–Labour coalition to power, which was more receptive to addressing women's rights. Frank Cluskey, Minister of State for Social Welfare, arranged for child benefit to be paid directly to mothers and shortened the waiting time for deserted wives seeking an allowance. Justice Minister Patrick Cooney and Attorney General Declan Costello also engaged with AIM and committed to introducing free legal aid and reforms in family law.

In 1973, Fennell founded a support group for deserted wives, ADAPT. The following year, she published a short book entitled Irish marriage – how are you!, which included chapters such as "Wife-beating – a husband's prerogative?", drawing from letters she had received from women during her work with AIM and her journalism.

In 1974, Fennell was moved by the BBC documentary Scream Quietly or the Neighbours Will Hear, which documented Irish women who fled to Britain to escape domestic violence. In response, she wrote a public letter to The Irish Times (1 March 1974) appealing for support to establish a women's refuge in Ireland. Within two weeks, she organised a meeting at Buswell's Hotel, and a committee was formed. Along with Mary Banotti and Susan Donnelly, Fennell travelled to London to meet Erin Pizzey, founder of the Chiswick Women's Aid centre. Following a fundraising appeal and with the assistance of businessman Joe McMenamin, who provided a house near Harcourt Street, Dublin, Ireland's first women's refuge was established. Within weeks, over fifty women and children sought shelter there. This initiative became Irish Women's Aid, with Fennell serving as its first chair.

Around this time, Fennell also became an executive member of the Council for the Status of Women, further strengthening her role in the Irish women's movement. She was also involved in the 1975 campaign advocating for the right to divorce in Ireland.

== Electoral politics ==
At the 1977 general election, Fennell stood as an independent candidate for the Dublin County South constituency. Although she was not elected, she polled well among voters, and her campaign brought her to the attention of Fine Gael, particularly Garret FitzGerald.

In 1979, following the introduction of direct elections to the European Parliament, Fennell contested the Dublin constituency as a Fine Gael candidate but was unsuccessful. The following year, alongside Deirdre McDevitt and Bernadette Quinn, she published Can You Stay Married? (1980), a self-help guide for women drawing from her work with AIM. The book offered practical advice on legal action within marriage and life after separation.

Fennell was elected to Dáil Éireann at the 1981 general election as a Fine Gael TD for Dublin South. A coalition government was formed between Fine Gael and the Labour Party under Garret FitzGerald, but it fell within months. A subsequent election in February 1982 resulted in a short-lived Fianna Fáil government under Charles Haughey. Following another election in November 1982, Fine Gael returned to government in coalition with Labour. Fennell retained her seat in both 1982 elections and was appointed Minister of State at the Department of the Taoiseach and Minister of State at the Department of Justice with responsibility for Women's Affairs and Family Law.

During the 1986 referendum on Divorce, Fennell was one of the primary advocates for legalisation.

During her time as a Minister of State, Fennell played a prominent role in orchestrating the 1986 referendum on the introduction of divorce, an issue long advocated for by AIM. Although the referendum was defeated, her efforts brought the matter to national prominence. She was also closely involved in driving several pieces of equality legislation through the Oireachtas, most notably the 1987 legislation abolishing the legal status of illegitimacy.

Fennell lost her seat at the 1987 general election but was immediately nominated to the 17th Seanad by Taoiseach Garret FitzGerald. She was subsequently elected to the 18th Seanad on the Labour Panel and served as a member of the Oireachtas committee on women's rights.

At the 1989 general election, Fennell was returned to the 26th Dáil for Dublin South. She retired from electoral politics at the 1992 general election.

== Political views ==
Fennell was a liberal feminist who believed in a pragmatic approach to politics. She believed that legislative progress required slow, methodical work and defended her approach against more radical feminists, citing the constraints of parliamentary politics.

In a 1985 interview with Hot Press, Fennell discussed her political views at the time. Fennell advocated for legislative change to achieve equality for women, contributing to amendments to the Employment Equality Act, the establishment of services for victims of domestic violence and sexual assault, and the drafting of the Status of Children Bill. On issues of sexuality and personal freedom, Fennell supported the legal availability of contraception for those 18 years of age or older, and took a cautious view on teenage sexual activity, believing adolescents were not emotionally or physically prepared for it. She opposed abortion, emphasising the foetus as "third party" that had to be considered. Fennell supported personal freedom of expression, admired figures like Boy George, and advocated for a cautious constitutional approach to the legalisation of divorce.While a practising Catholic, she criticised the institutional Church's response to the changing roles of women and she advocated for internal reform within the Church.

Dáil	Election	Deputy (Party)	Deputy (Party)	Deputy (Party)	Deputy (Party)	Deputy (Party)	Deputy (Party)	Deputy (Party)
2nd	1921	Thomas Kelly (SF)	Daniel McCarthy (SF)	Constance Markievicz (SF)	Cathal Ó Murchadha (SF)	4 seats 1921–1923		
3rd	1922	Thomas Kelly (PT-SF)	Daniel McCarthy (PT-SF)	William O'Brien (Lab)	Myles Keogh (Ind.)	4 seats 1921–1923		
4th	1923	Philip Cosgrave (CnaG)	Daniel McCarthy (CnaG)	Constance Markievicz (Rep)	Myles Keogh (Ind.)	Cathal Ó Murchadha (Rep)	Michael Hayes (CnaG)	Peadar Doyle (CnaG)
4th	1923 by-election	Philip Cosgrave (CnaG)	Daniel McCarthy (CnaG)	Constance Markievicz (Rep)	Myles Keogh (Ind.)	Cathal Ó Murchadha (Rep)	Hugh Kennedy (CnaG)	Peadar Doyle (CnaG)
4th	March 1924 by-election	James O'Mara (CnaG)	Daniel McCarthy (CnaG)	Constance Markievicz (Rep)	Myles Keogh (Ind.)	Cathal Ó Murchadha (Rep)	Hugh Kennedy (CnaG)	Peadar Doyle (CnaG)
4th	November 1924 by-election	James O'Mara (CnaG)	Daniel McCarthy (CnaG)	Constance Markievicz (Rep)	Myles Keogh (Ind.)	Cathal Ó Murchadha (Rep)	Seán Lemass (SF)	Peadar Doyle (CnaG)
4th	1925 by-election	James O'Mara (CnaG)	Thomas Hennessy (CnaG)	Constance Markievicz (Rep)	Myles Keogh (Ind.)	Cathal Ó Murchadha (Rep)	Seán Lemass (SF)	Peadar Doyle (CnaG)
5th	1927 (Jun)	James Beckett (CnaG)	Vincent Rice (NL)	Constance Markievicz (FF)	Myles Keogh (Ind.)	Thomas Lawlor (Lab)	Seán Lemass (FF)	Peadar Doyle (CnaG)
5th	1927 by-election	James Beckett (CnaG)	Vincent Rice (NL)	Thomas Hennessy (CnaG)	Myles Keogh (Ind.)	Thomas Lawlor (Lab)	Seán Lemass (FF)	Peadar Doyle (CnaG)
6th	1927 (Sep)	James Beckett (CnaG)	Robert Briscoe (FF)	Thomas Hennessy (CnaG)	Myles Keogh (CnaG)	Frank Kerlin (FF)	Seán Lemass (FF)	Peadar Doyle (CnaG)
7th	1932	James Beckett (CnaG)	Robert Briscoe (FF)	Thomas Hennessy (CnaG)	Myles Keogh (CnaG)	James Lynch (FF)	Seán Lemass (FF)	Peadar Doyle (CnaG)
8th	1933	James Beckett (CnaG)	Robert Briscoe (FF)	James McGuire (CnaG)	Thomas Kelly (FF)	James Lynch (FF)	Seán Lemass (FF)	Peadar Doyle (CnaG)
9th	1937	Myles Keogh (FG)	Robert Briscoe (FF)	Thomas Lawlor (Lab)	Thomas Kelly (FF)	Joseph Hannigan (Ind.)	Seán Lemass (FF)	Peadar Doyle (FG)
10th	1938	James Beckett (FG)	Robert Briscoe (FF)	James Lynch (FF)	Thomas Kelly (FF)	Joseph Hannigan (Ind.)	Seán Lemass (FF)	Peadar Doyle (FG)
10th	1939 by-election	John McCann (FF)	Robert Briscoe (FF)	James Lynch (FF)	Thomas Kelly (FF)	Joseph Hannigan (Ind.)	Seán Lemass (FF)	Peadar Doyle (FG)
11th	1943	Maurice Dockrell (FG)	Robert Briscoe (FF)	James Lynch (FF)	James Larkin Jnr (Lab)	John McCann (FF)	Seán Lemass (FF)	Peadar Doyle (FG)
12th	1944	Maurice Dockrell (FG)	Robert Briscoe (FF)	James Lynch (FF)	James Larkin Jnr (Lab)	John McCann (FF)	Seán Lemass (FF)	Peadar Doyle (FG)
13th	1948	Constituency abolished. See Dublin South-Central, Dublin South-East and Dublin South-West.						

Dáil	Election	Deputy (Party)	Deputy (Party)	Deputy (Party)	Deputy (Party)	Deputy (Party)
22nd	1981	Niall Andrews (FF)	Séamus Brennan (FF)	Nuala Fennell (FG)	John Kelly (FG)	Alan Shatter (FG)
23rd	1982 (Feb)	Niall Andrews (FF)	Séamus Brennan (FF)	Nuala Fennell (FG)	John Kelly (FG)	Alan Shatter (FG)
24th	1982 (Nov)	Niall Andrews (FF)	Séamus Brennan (FF)	Nuala Fennell (FG)	John Kelly (FG)	Alan Shatter (FG)
25th	1987	Tom Kitt (FF)	Séamus Brennan (FF)	Anne Colley (PDs)	John Kelly (FG)	Alan Shatter (FG)
26th	1989	Tom Kitt (FF)	Séamus Brennan (FF)	Nuala Fennell (FG)	Roger Garland (GP)	Alan Shatter (FG)
27th	1992	Tom Kitt (FF)	Séamus Brennan (FF)	Liz O'Donnell (PDs)	Eithne FitzGerald (Lab)	Alan Shatter (FG)
28th	1997	Tom Kitt (FF)	Séamus Brennan (FF)	Liz O'Donnell (PDs)	Olivia Mitchell (FG)	Alan Shatter (FG)
29th	2002	Tom Kitt (FF)	Séamus Brennan (FF)	Liz O'Donnell (PDs)	Olivia Mitchell (FG)	Eamon Ryan (GP)
30th	2007	Tom Kitt (FF)	Séamus Brennan (FF)	Alan Shatter (FG)	Olivia Mitchell (FG)	Eamon Ryan (GP)
30th	2009 by-election	Tom Kitt (FF)	George Lee (FG)	Alan Shatter (FG)	Olivia Mitchell (FG)	Eamon Ryan (GP)
31st	2011	Shane Ross (Ind.)	Peter Mathews (FG)	Alan Shatter (FG)	Olivia Mitchell (FG)	Alex White (Lab)
32nd	2016	Constituency abolished. See Dublin Rathdown, Dublin South-West and Dún Laoghaire.				
