= Percival Hussey =

Australian sportsman

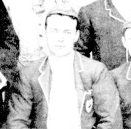

Personal information
- Full name: Percival Leith Hussey
- Born: 23 June 1869; Perth, Western Australia
- Died: 13 May 1944 (aged 74); Adelaide, South Australia

Domestic team information
- Years: Team
- 1892/93: Western Australia
- FC debut: 27 March 1893 Western Australia v South Australia
- Last FC: 1 April 1893 Western Australia v Victoria

Career statistics
Competition	First-class
Matches	2
Runs scored	27
Batting average	6.75
100s/50s	0/0
Top score	14
Catches/stumpings	0/–
- Source: CricketArchive, 8 November 2011

Percival Leitch Hussey (23 June 1869 – 13 May 1944) was an Australian sportsman. He played first-class cricket for Western Australia, football for the Rovers Football Club in the West Australian Football Association (WAFA), and was also a noted runner.

== Career ==
Hussey was born in Perth, Western Australia in 1869. He played several matches for the Rovers Football Club in the late 1880s and early 1890s, and also played for Perth against Fremantle in the annual cricket match in 1886. He later played for Metropolitans in the WACA District competition. From 1890, he served as secretary of the general committee of the Western Australian Cricket Association, and in this role was responsible for the procurement of the Perth Recreation Ground for the use of the association. In 1893, he was a member of the first representative cricket team from Western Australia to tour interstate, playing four matches on the tour, two of which were accorded first-class status. His highest score on tour was 14, against South Australia batting at number seven. Hussey was also a noted runner – The Western Mail wrote in March 1891: "[He] was reckoned the best runner in the colony about twelve months ago". Hussey emigrated to Adelaide in the early 20th century, where he died in 1944.

== Family ==
A son Percival Francis Leitch Hussey (6 July 1897 – 11 November 1954) was a noted medical practitioner and yachtsman.

Another son, Howard Leitch Hussey (ca.1899 – 15 November 1988), served in World War I, enlisting in July 1917, and was repatriated in 1919 affected by poison gas.
