= Michael Hissey =

Michael Hissey is an Australian musician, educator and conductor. He is well known for his contributions to the vocal and choral musical life of Sydney. His notable contributions include musical director of the St Mary's Singers at St Mary's Cathedral, Sydney and director of music at St Aloysius' College, Milsons Point in Sydney.

Hissey has an association with St Mary's Cathedral which has spanned the past 65 years being accepted as a choral scholar to the St Mary's Cathedral Choir a young age and completing his schooling at the Cathedral Choir School.

After completing post graduate studies in Education in Sydney, Hissey embarked on the dual careers of teaching and concert singing. In addition to his success as a notable educator, he went on to become a popular concert solo baritone and teacher of voice, earning particular critical acclaim for his Baroque and Early Music performances.

Hissey has performed as a vocal concert soloist throughout Australia, in Europe and the United States and as a regular guest artist for many of Sydney's metropolitan and regional choral and orchestral organisations.

Whilst Hissey has specialised in the performance of music from the Sacred and Oratorio literature, he is also deeply involved in fostering the talent of young singers with an established reputation as a teacher of voice and choral director. He held the position of director of music at St Aloysius' College, Sydney from 2001 to 2011. He and his wife Narelle currently reside in the regional NSW town of Moss Vale. Hissey is active in assisting with the development of vocal music in the region and has contributed as a mentor to trainee teachers in the Education Faculties of Charles Sturt and Western Sydney Universities.
