= Henry Hussey (fl. 1529) =

English politician

Henry Hussey (by 1495 – 1541/1544) of Slinfold, West Sussex, was an English politician.

He was a Member (MP) of the Parliament of England for Horsham in 1529. He was the father of Sir Henry Hussey, MP, of Slinfold (died 1557), and of John Hussey, MP, of Cuckfield. He was the uncle of Anthony Hussey (died 1560), Principal Registrar to the Archbishops of Canterbury and Governor of the Muscovy Company and of the Merchant Adventurers at Antwerp.
