= Sir Thomas Hussey, 2nd Baronet =

English politician

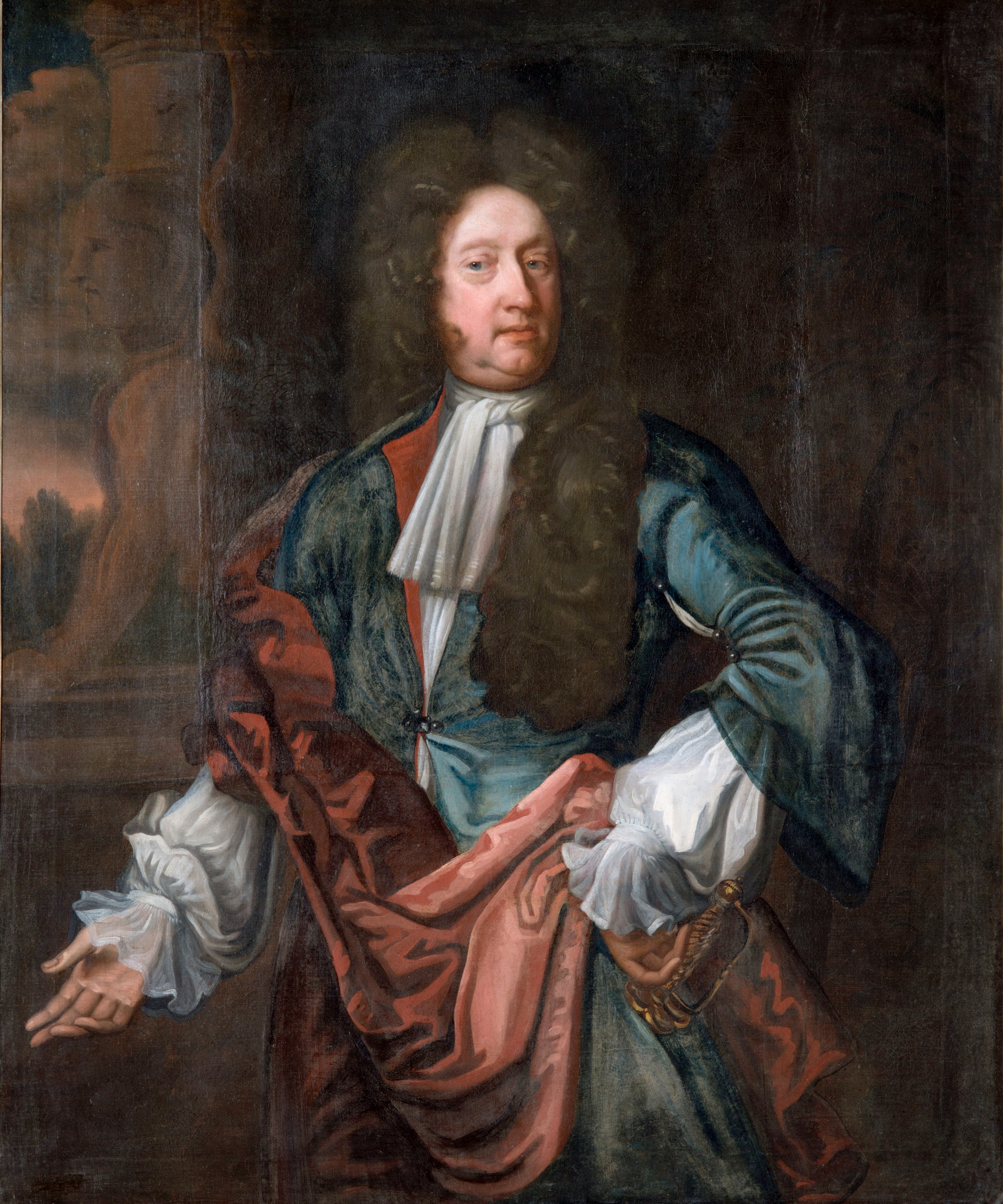
- Born: 1639
- Baptised: 14 January 1639
- Died: 19 December 1706 (aged 66–67)
- Resting place: Church of St Wilfrid, Honington
- Occupation: Politician
- Spouse(s): Sarah Langham
- Children: Sarah Hussey, Elizabeth Hussey, Rebecca Hussey
- Parent(s): Thomas Hussey; Rhoda Chapman
- Relatives: William Hussey
- Position held: High Sheriff of Lincolnshire (1669–)

Sir Thomas Hussey, 2nd Baronet (1639 – 19 December 1706), of Honington, Lincolnshire, was an English Member of Parliament.

He was the eldest surviving son of Thomas Hussey of Honington and was educated privately and at Christ's College, Cambridge (1655). He succeeded his father before 1641 and succeeded his grandfather as 2nd Baronet in 1648. He was appointed High Sheriff of Lincolnshire for 1668–69.

He was elected a Member (MP) of the Parliament of England for Lincoln in 1681 and Lincolnshire in 1685, 1689, 1690 and 1695.

He married Sarah, the daughter of Sir John Langham, 1st Baronet, of Crosby Place, London and Cottesbrooke, Northamptonshire, with whom he had six sons and four daughters.

Parliament of England
Preceded by Henry Monson; Sir Thomas Meres	Member of Parliament for Lincoln; 1681–1685; With: Sir Thomas Meres	Succeeded by Sir Henry Monson, Bt; Sir Thomas Meres
Preceded by Sir Robert Carr, Bt; The Viscount Castleton	Member of Parliament for Lincolnshire; 1685–1698; With: The Viscount Castleton	Succeeded by Charles Dymoke; George Whichcot
Baronetage of England
Preceded by Edward Hussey	Baronet (of Honington); 1648–1706	Succeeded by Edward Hussey
