= Anna Maria Hussey =

British mycologist, writer, and illustrator

- Born: Anna Maria Reed; 5 June 1805; Leckhampstead, Buckinghamshire
- Died: 26 August 1853 (aged 48); Saint-Maurice, Val-de-Marne, France
- Known for: mycologist, scientific illustrator
- Spouse: Thomas John Hussey

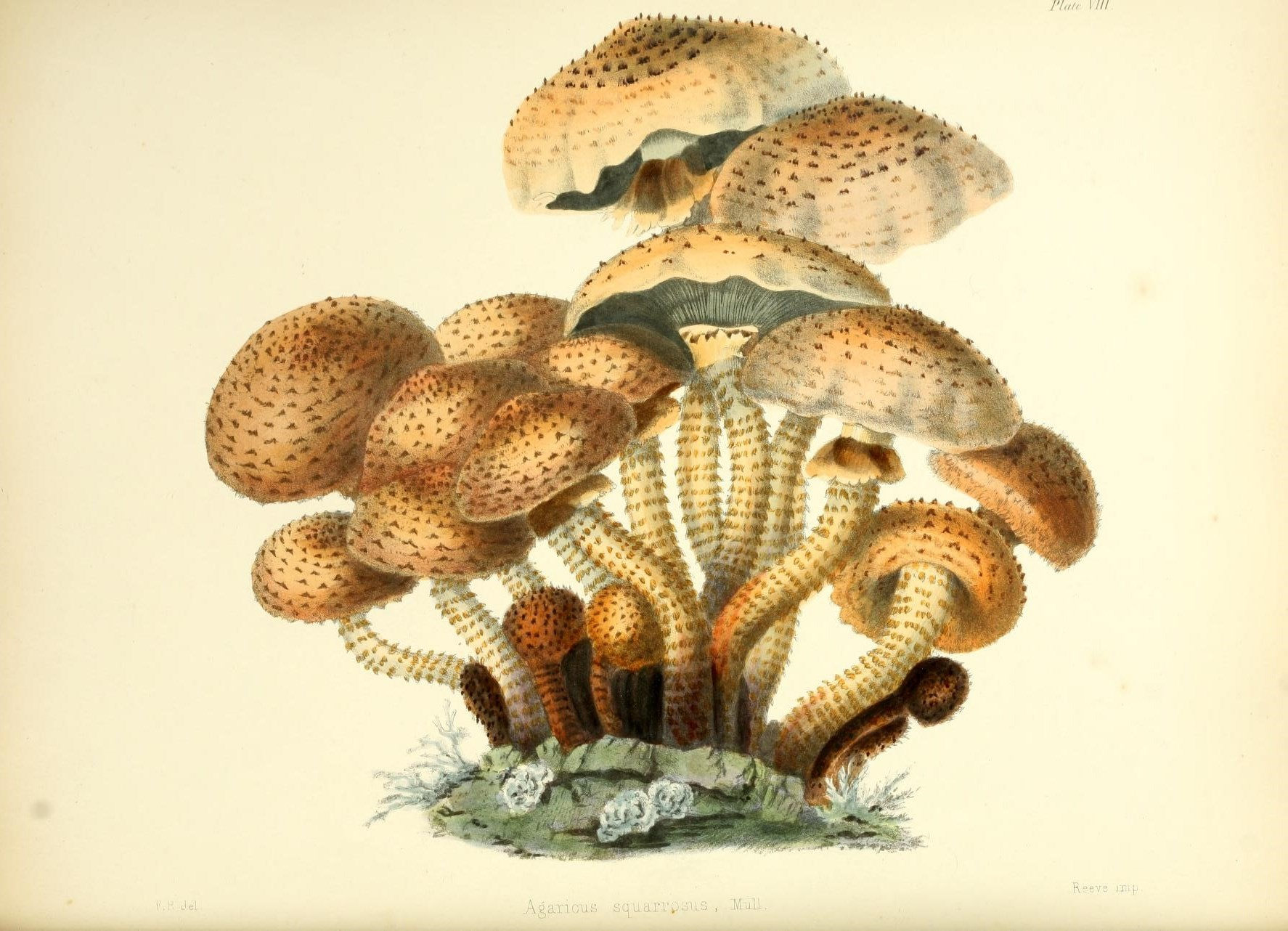
Agaricus squarrosus (now known as Pholiota squarrosa) from Illustrations of British mycology

Anna Maria Hussey, née Reed (5 June 1805 – 26 August 1853) was a British mycologist, writer, and illustrator.

== Family and background ==
Anna Maria Reed was born in Leckhampstead, Buckinghamshire, one of seven children of Rev. John Theodore Archibald Reed, rector of Leckhampstead, and Anna Maria Dayrell. We know little about Anna's childhood or education. Her father, a rector, probably encouraged an interest in science as part of her home schooling. There were plenty of books around the home, since Anna's father collected Bibles printed in various languages. Her sisters Henrietta (1807–60) and Frances (1810–72) stimulated an interest in botany and art, although Anna's diaries indicate that at first she was intrigued by geology.

In 1831, at 26, she married Rev. Dr Thomas John Hussey, rector of Hayes, Kent, who was a well-connected astronomer and scientist in his own right. They had six children, one of whom was also given the name Anna Maria Hussey. Only two survived to adulthood.

Hussey was a strong willed woman who approached her personal researches with an enthusiasm that she did not quite feel for her role as a clergyman's wife. She resisted when she was called upon by "every old woman in the parish" and she chafed at her husband's reminders of her duties.

During her most creative period, she maintained an active and candid correspondence with her mycological mentor, Reverend M. J. Berkley, which provides many details of her daily life and work. In his lifetime, Berkeley described over 6,000 new species of fungi. He assisted Hussey with identifications and she supplied him with specimens. She was also acquainted with Charles Badham, a scholar of classical literature, and mycologist M. C. Cooke, who cites Hussey in his 1875 Fungi: Their Nature and Uses and called her "friend".

In the 1840s, she contributed writings (possibly including a romantic serial) to The Surplice, a magazine edited by her husband. She also wrote at least one less romantic story, called 'Matrimony', for Frazer's Magazine – but all these pieces were anonymous, following the conventions of the time.

== Collecting and illustrating fungi ==
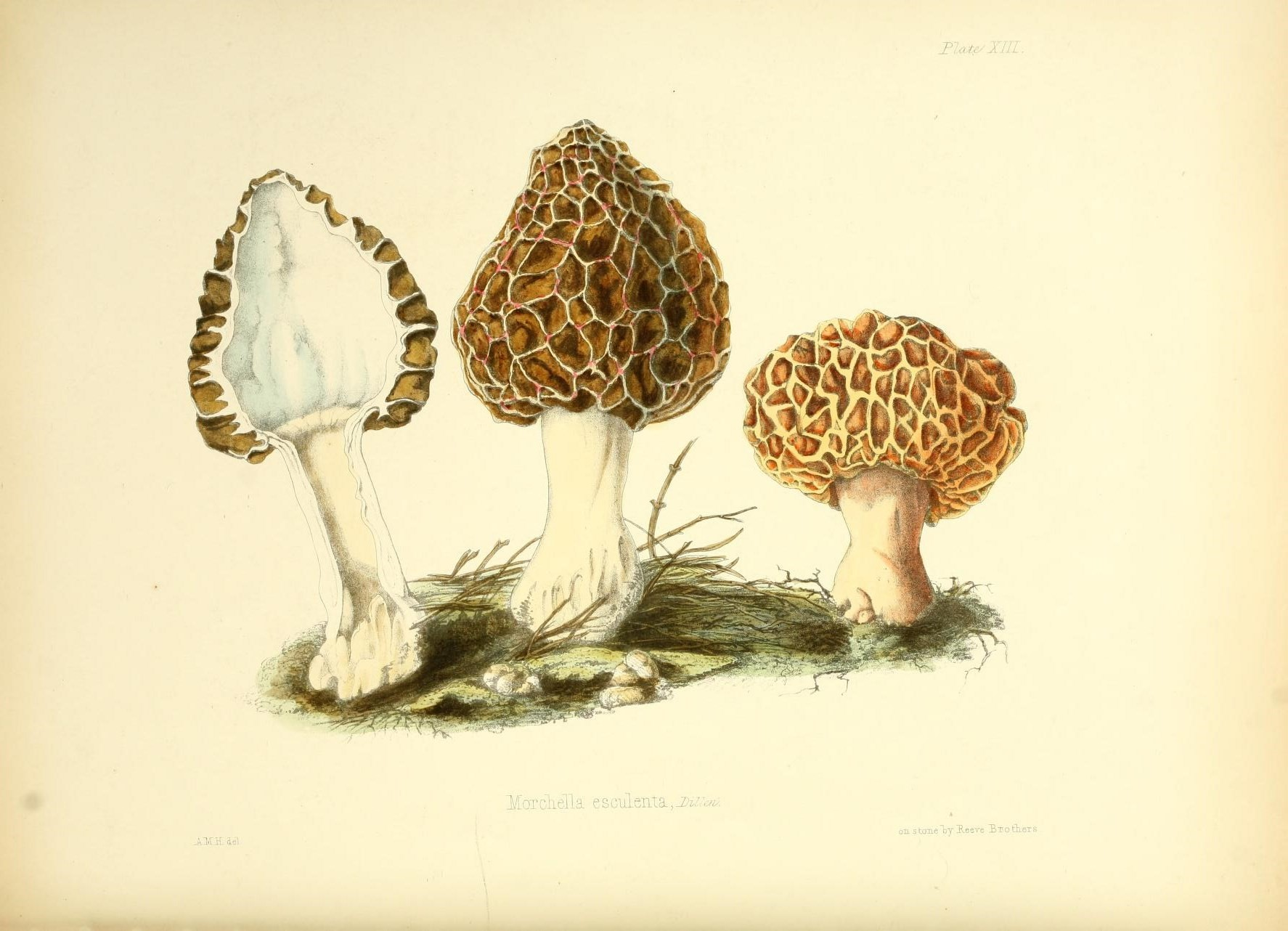
Morchella esculenta illustrated by Anna Maria Hussey

Anna Maria Hussey had an interest in natural history and knew Charles Darwin at nearby Down House. One of her brothers, George Varenne Reed, became tutor to Darwin's sons. Hussey (together with her younger sister, Frances Reed) developed an expertise in fungi, corresponding with and sending specimens to the leading mycologist of the day, Rev. Miles Joseph Berkeley. Hussey's approach to mycology came from the artistic end, rather than from the scientific fields of systematics, field work, or microscopy. She and her sister made watercolour paintings of some of the species they encountered and in 1847 a number of Hussey's illustrations were published as plates in A treatise on the esculent funguses of England by Charles David Badham. These went uncredited, however, as noted by a contemporary reviewer.

At the same time, she produced (as Mrs T. J. Hussey) the first volume of an ambitious and expensive work entitled Illustrations of British Mycology, containing 90 colour plates of species collected and illustrated by herself or by her sister, together with descriptions, personal observations, anecdotes, and comments. Illustrations of British mycology is not simply a taxonomic litany of fungi. It is instead a catalog of Anna's experiences with, and knowledge of, fungi. She hoped that her work would inspire future mushroom enthusiasts, especially young people. To that end, she provided instructions on hunting and caring for specimens caught in the countryside. In the introduction to Illustrations, she notes that:

"A basket is in the first place needful, and if the student should leave home without one, a profusion of lovely and rare objects will be certain to strew his path; in which case there are but two alternatives, to dissect on the spot, always an imperfect operation, or to carry away the spoil in hat or handkerchief, when on arrival at home, a heterogeneous mass of caps, stems, etc., presents itself—disjecta membra!" A second volume of 50 colour plates was published posthumously in 1855, cut short by her early death. The two volumes, especially the illustrations, were well received and praised for their "scientific accuracy" as well as their "artistic elegance".

Berkeley named a fungal genus Husseia after "my friend, Mrs Hussey, whose talents well deserve such a distinction" (though the later Husseya J. Agardh, a genus of seaweeds named after Australian collector Jessie Hussey, has been conserved against it). Berkeley also named an agaric species, illustrated in volume two of Illustrations of British Mycology, Cortinarius reediae, after Frances Reed. Their specimens of fungi sent to Berkeley are now in the mycological herbarium at the Royal Botanic Gardens, Kew.

== Death ==
Hussey died on 26 August 1853 at Charenton where she was admitted by her son, John Garda Hussey, twelve days before. The medical register and subsequent autopsy indicate that she was suffering from delirium tremens caused by prolonged use of alcoholic liquor, and died from a stroke.

== Recent exhibition and publications ==
In recent years, Anna Maria Hussey has attracted attention as a Victorian, female, scientific illustrator and was one of twelve such artists featured in a 2005 'Women's Work' exhibition staged in the United States by the Linda Hall Library and Missouri Botanical Garden Library. Her correspondence with Berkeley has also been published and she has recently received an entry in the Dictionary of National Biography.
