= Christopher Hussey (historian) =

British architectural historian (1899–1970)

Christopher Hussey CBE
- Born: Christopher Edward Clive Hussey; 21 October 1899; London, England
- Died: 20 March 1970 (aged 70); Scotney Castle, Kent, England
- Education: Christ Church, Oxford
- Spouse: Elizabeth Kerr-Smiley (m. 1936)
- Relatives: William Clive Hussey (father)
- Writing career
- Subject: British architecture

Christopher Edward Clive Hussey CBE (21 October 1899 – 20 March 1970) was a British architecture writer. He was one of the chief authorities on British domestic architecture of the generation that also included Dorothy Stroud and Sir John Summerson.

== Background ==
Hussey was born in London, the son of William Clive Hussey and his wife, Mary Ann (née Herbert) Hussey. He was educated at Eton College and Christ Church, Oxford. During World War I, he was a first lieutenant with the Royal Field Artillery.

== Career ==
His first major ventures both appeared in 1927. One was a collaboration with his mentor and predecessor at Country Life magazine, H. Avray Tipping, in Tipping's series In English Homes, Period IV, vol. 2, The Work of Sir John Vanbrugh and his School, 1699–1736 (1927). English garden history was an unexplored field when Hussey broke ground the same year with The Picturesque: Studies in a Point of View (1927; reprinted 1967), which was a pioneer in the history of taste that rediscovered from obscurity figures like Richard Payne Knight, "a Regency prophet of modernism" in Hussey's estimation. Later in Hussey's career, English Gardens and Landscapes 1700–1750 (1967), also covered fresh territory, as a complement to his Georgian volumes English Country Houses.

He is chiefly remembered for the long series of articles he wrote from the 1920s onwards for Country Life (where he became architectural editor), in which he continued the work of his mentor Tipping in setting architectural history in its social history. Based on his accumulated experience in country houses and their muniment rooms, his series of English Country Houses: ECH: Early Georgian, 1715–1760, (1955; revised, 1965); ECH: Mid-Georgian, 1760–1800 (1956) and ECH: Late Georgian, 1800–1840 (1958) provided an overview of high-style Georgian domestic architecture. Eighteenth century Georgian houses were widely admired, but at the time of publication Regency houses were not regarded, though a collectors' vogue for early 19th-century furniture had spurred Margaret Jourdain's Regency Furniture (1934). "The surviving houses of the Regency period took on a new lease of life, partly thanks to Country Life authors such as Christopher Hussey who played a significant role in the rediscovery and popularisation of the Regency period" (Sir John Soane's Museum Newsletter 10)

Hussey's series of monographs on selected houses and a series The Colleges of Oxford and Cambridge collected material drawn from his Country Life articles, offered in more permanent format: Petworth House, Clarence House, London, Ely House, London, Berkeley Castle, Eton College, Shugborough were all given the Hussey treatment, and they demonstrate the range of his competence. Hussey contributed the chapters on architectural history to H. Clifford Smith, Buckingham Palace: Its Furniture, Decoration & History (1931; reprinted 1937).

He wrote monographs on the conservative contemporary British architect Sir Robert Lorimer (1931) and The Life of Sir Edwin Lutyens, which historian David Watkin rated "the finest architectural biography" in English. Lutyens' first big London office building was the Country Life Building (1904) in Covent Garden, commissioned by the magazine's editor, Edward Hudson. With A.S.G. Butler and George Stewart, Hussey contributed to the definitive three-volume Architecture of Sir Edwin Lutyens (1950), the opening shot in the ongoing reappraisal of Lutyens' buildings. Nevertheless, Hussey's Country Life articles on contemporary houses are often overlooked.

In the next generation, Hussey's example influenced John Cornforth, with whom he co-wrote the later editions of Hussey's Guide to English Country Houses Open to the Public (first published by Hussey in 1951), and who wrote a series of Country Life articles in 1981 "Continuity and Progress: Christopher Hussey and Modern Architecture" (Country Life, vol. CLXIX, 22 October 1981, pp. 1366–68, etc.) To a lesser extent Hussey's example influenced Mark Girouard, whose Life in the English Country House (1979) took a new view, concerned with life downstairs as well as with architects and their patrons among the gentry.

== Personal life and death ==
In 1936, Hussey married Elizabeth Kerr-Smiley. From 1952 onward, they lived at his family home of Scotney Castle in Kent, where he died on 20 March 1970. He left the house and estate to the National Trust, with the proviso that his wife Elizabeth have full use of the house, which she lived in until her death in 2006.

== Books ==
- Hussey, Christopher and Tipping, H. Avray. In English Homes, Period IV, Volume II, The Work of Sir John Vanbrugh and his School, 1699–1736 (1927), Country Life, London.
- Hussey, Christopher. The picturesque: studies in a point of view (1927), G.P. Putnam's Sons, London and New York.
