= John Hussey (MP for Horsham and New Shoreham) =

16th-century English politician

John Hussey (c. 1520 – c. 1572), of Cuckfield, Sussex, was an English politician.

He was a member (MP) of the parliament of England for New Shoreham in 1559 and for Horsham in 1571.
