= Thomas John Hussey =

English clergyman and astronomer

- Born: 4 April 1797; Lamberhurst, Kent
- Died: after 1866, presumed dead February 1893
- Education: Eton; Trinity College, Dublin
- Known for: Predicting the existence of Neptune
- Scientific career
- Fields: Astronomy

Thomas John Hussey (4 April 1797 – c. 1866) was an English clergyman and astronomer.

== Background and education ==
T. J. Hussey was born in Lamberhurst, Kent, the only son of Rev. John Hussey and Catherine Jennings. The Husseys were an old, armigerous, Anglo-Norman family and substantial local landowners, the Rev. Hussey being the younger brother of Edward Hussey of Scotney Castle. Thomas Hussey's father died in Allahabad in 1799, leaving Catherine to look after her son. She sent him to Eton, but subsequently became financially embroiled with an Irish barrister, J. P. Maccabe, who claimed to be her nephew. According to a deed of gift written by (or as if by) Catherine, young Thomas, whilst still at Eton, "rendered me miserable...took a considerable sum of money from me, and went away, I knew not whither. He enlisted: my hopes were blasted of ever seeing him either respectable in life, or a man of education...I knew my unfortunate boy well and feared the worst. My son's uncle...Edward Hussey, refused to have anything to do with him." Maccabe took Thomas to Dublin, where he attended Trinity College. However, Maccabe also took Catherine's inheritance of some £50,000. A case against Maccabe went to the Irish Court of Chancery where he was judged to have obtained the money by "undue influence, fraud, and misrepresentation". The case was appealed in the House of Lords in 1831, but Maccabe was ordered to repay £36,500 to Catherine.

Hussey emerged from these troubles with the degree of Doctor of Divinity in 1835. He subsequently received ad eundem degrees from the University of Oxford in 1836 and the University of Durham in 1840.

In 1839, Hussey was admitted to the Freedom of the Worshipful Company of Bowyers of the City of London by patrimony, his father having been admitted in 1773.

== Clergyman ==
In 1831, Hussey became rector of Hayes, Kent, and married Anna Maria Reed who was later a noted mycologist and illustrator.

In his clerical capacity he published several sermons, but his magnum opus was a revised edition of the Bible with "a brief hermeneutic and exegetical commentary", published in two volumes in 1843–1845. Though it must have represented many years' work, it received lukewarm contemporary reviews, The Athenaeum, for example, noted laconically that "Dr Hussey has done much – much to deserve our gratitude; but he is often too brief and has no foot-notes."

== Astronomer ==
Hussey was an amateur astronomer and established a significant, personal observatory at Hayes, with a 6.5-inch-diameter (170 mm) refracting telescope by Joseph von Fraunhofer, a Newtonian telescope of 7 ft focal length by William Herschel, and a 9.3-inch Gregorian-Newtonian. He also acquired a range of other instruments, including a mysterious 'akaremeter' which seems to have been the equivalent of a modern stop-watch.

He had a remarkable circle of acquaintances and correspondents. He knew and visited Charles Darwin who lived at nearby Down House — though Darwin's only reference to Hussey, in a letter to his sister, noted that the doctor "talked grand nonsense", albeit about church and local matters. His correspondents included Sir John Frederick William Herschel, Sir John William Lubbock, Augustus De Morgan, Charles Babbage, John T. Graves. and Cardinal John Henry Newman.

His astronomical observations resulted in a series of letters, papers, and notes, including one on the rotation of Venus, as well as drawings of sun spots, presented to the Royal Astronomical Society in 1847. Hussey also compiled star maps, one of which (the Hora XIV star map) earned him a prize from the Berlin Academy in 1831.

=== Halley's Comet ===
Hussey achieved some contemporary celebrity as being one of the first people in Britain (along with Sir James South) to see the return of Halley's Comet on 22 August 1835, communicating his subsequent observations with enthusiasm. At the time, Hussey was engaged in publishing a Catalogue of Comets in a series of papers for the Philosophical Magazine.

=== Discovery of Neptune ===
Hussey has frequently been credited with being the first person to suggest the existence of the planet Neptune. The sequence of events leading to the discovery of Neptune was, however, contentious at the time and still remains so. Following the publication of tables of the recently discovered planet Uranus by French astronomer Alexis Bouvard, Hussey noted anomalies in the orbit (based on his own observations at Hayes), and considered they might be caused by the presence of an exterior planet. He visited Bouvard in Paris and discussed the anomalies and his theory with him, discovering that Bouvard had entertained the same possibility. Bouvard offered (if he found time) to undertake the calculations necessary for Hussey to search for such a planet, but nothing came of this. In November 1834, Hussey therefore wrote to the eminent British astronomer George Biddell Airy, who was later to become Astronomer Royal, reporting the "apparently inexplicable discrepancies", suggesting "the possibility of some disturbing body beyond Uranus, not taken into account because unknown", and asking for help in calculating where he should look for the putative new planet. It was Hussey's intention to draw up a detailed star map and use this to detect any planetary motion. He considered that his observatory and observational skills were sufficient for the task. Airy, who later published the correspondence in a post-mortem on events, replied negatively, saying there was not "the smallest hope of making out the nature of any external action on the planet" and that the anomalies were probably based on observational errors. If they were true, he doubted the possibility of determining the position of any external planet, at least until "the nature of the irregularity was well determined from several successive revolutions". Since one revolution of Uranus takes 84 years, this replied must have dampened Hussey's enthusiasm for the project. The planet Neptune was discovered twelve years later by Johann Gottfried Galle and Heinrich Luis d'Arrest based on calculations supplied by Urbain Le Verrier.

A "severe injury" forced Hussey to give up his observations in 1838. Most of his telescopes and other instruments were purchased by the University of Durham, starting the university's long history of astronomical research.

== Disappearance and presumption of death ==
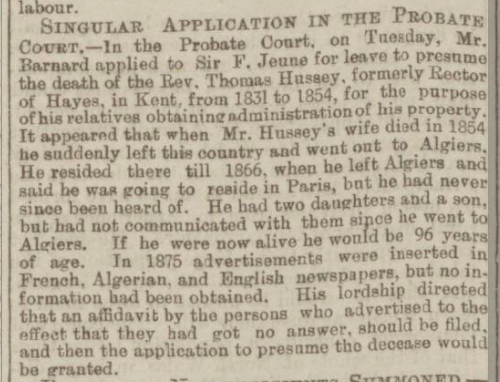
Manchester Courier & General Advertiser, 25th February 1893, application for Thomas John Hussey to be presumed dead

Thomas Hussey's wife, Anna Maria, died August 26, 1853. In March 1854 Hussey began an "...eloquent and, what promised to be a very lengthy sermon, in Hayes Parish Church. He was still in the midst of his subject matter when he announced that he should conclude on a future occasion. Before the following Sunday he disappeared..." Hussey subsequently resigned his living on 11 March 1854 and left England for Algiers. He was last heard from in 1866 when he wrote to his children to advise them of his intention to move to Paris. He was never heard from again despite advertisements being placed in newspapers in both Algiers and Paris. In February 1893, Hussey's daughter made an application to the Probate Court to have her father presumed dead, which was granted. The mystery of Hussey's disappearance was never solved.

His brother-in-law, Rev. George Varenne Reed, took over as rector of Hayes in 1854. The rectory is now a public library.

== See also ==
- List of people who disappeared mysteriously (pre-1910)
