= Henry Hussey, 1st Baron Hussey =

Arms of Henry Hussey, Baron Hussey: Ermine, three bars gules.

Henry Hussey, 1st Baron Hussey (1265–1332) was an English soldier and politician. He was described in 1309 as "the son of the elder sister of Florence, widow of Walter de Insular (de L'Isle) and co-parencer with her, of Pulburough manor, Sussex".

Henry Hussey was married about 1290, to Isabel. He was summoned to Parliament on 24 June 1295 and was returned for the following 30 years. He was known as Lord Hussey from 1295.

He was summoned for military service by King Edward I on 16 July 1294 in the putting down of a rebellion in Gascony and "to attend the king wherever he might be". He volunteered his service for the defence of the English coast in 1296 as a knight of Chichester. He thereafter engaged in military service against Scotland in 1297, 1299, and 1301. Henry was ordered "to remain in the North during the winter campaign" in the war against Scotland in 1315.

Overlord of Knygttone Paynell manor in Wiltshire 1317, he was appointed High Sheriff of Surrey and Sussex in 1320. He continued his military service into the reign of Edward II.

Lord Hoese (Hussey) was summoned as a knight of Gloucestershire and Sussex to the Great Council at Westminster (9 May 1324). He was ordered to military service in Gascony on 21 December 1324.

Henry Hussey died in February 1331–32 at age 66 "on Friday before St. Peter in cathedra, leaving widow, Isabel, and son and heir", (Knights of Edward I).

His son was Henry Hussey, 2nd Baron Hussey.

== Notes ==
Peerage of England
New creation	Baron Hussey; 1295–1332	Succeeded by Henry Hussey
