= William Hussey (writer) =

English author (born 1977)

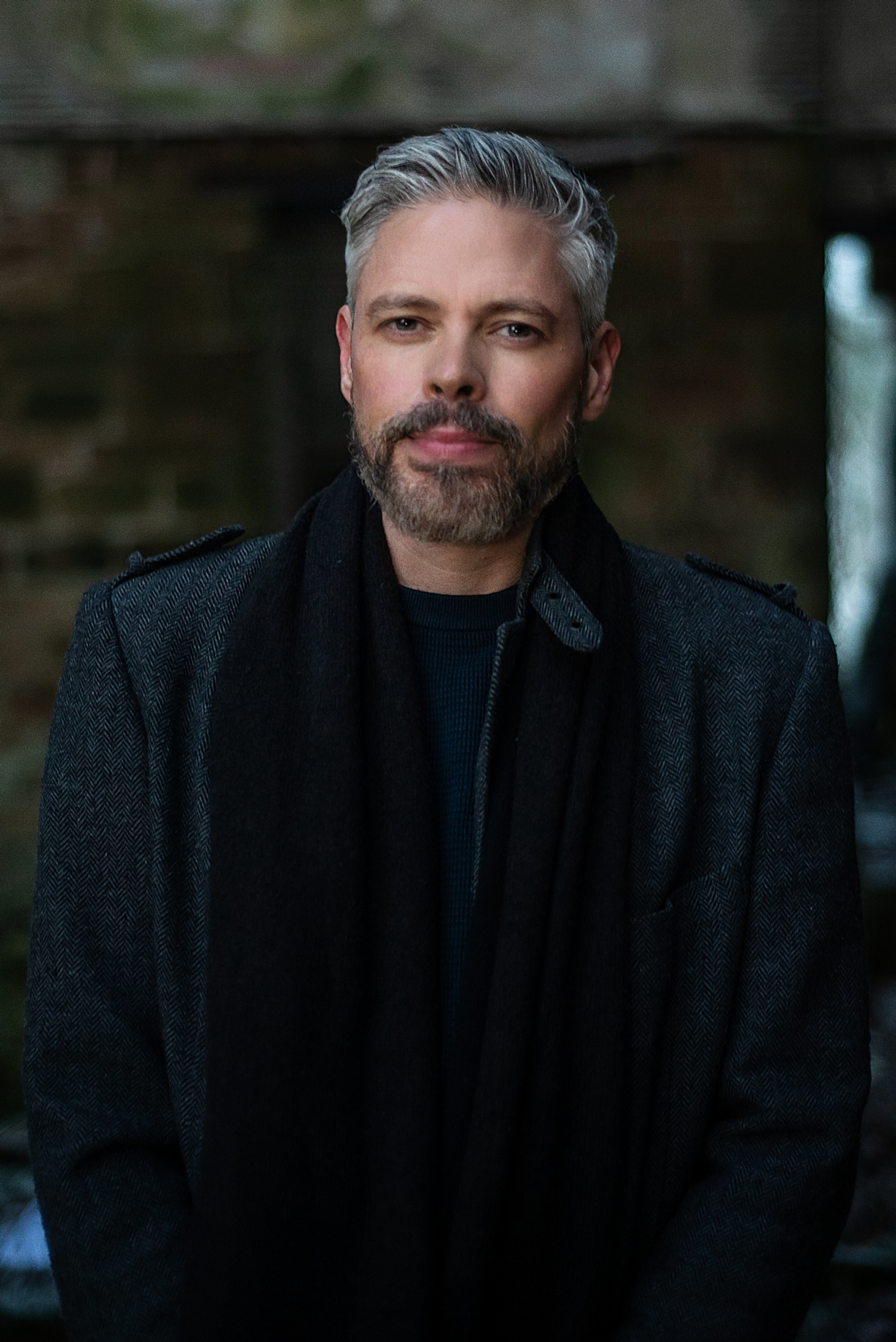
- Hussey in 2022
- Born: 15 July 1977 (age 49); Hounslow, Greater London, England
- Other name: Bill Hussey
- Education: Sheffield Hallam University (MA)
- Years active: 2008–present
- Spouse: Chris White (m. 2026)

William Hussey (born 15 July 1977) is an English author of horror, crime, thrillers and LGBTQIA+ YA novels. His novels include Hideous Beauty (2020) and The Outrage (2021), the Killing Jericho (2023–2025) trilogy and The Boy I Love (2025).

== Early life and education ==
Hussey was born in Hounslow, West London. His father was from the Traveller community and a member of the Showmen's Guild; his family had been active on fairgrounds for at least 200 years. Hussey lived a "seasonally peripatetic" lifestyle around London and the South East until age 12, when his family settled in Skegness, Lincolnshire.

After graduating from university, Hussey pursued law at a firm in North Yorkshire. He quit and went on to graduate with a Master of Arts (MA) in Creative Writing from Sheffield Hallam University.

== Career ==
Under the name Bill Hussey, he published his debut and second novels Through a Glass, Darkly and The Absence in 2008 and 2009 respectively. Announced in 2009, Oxford University Press acquired the rights to publish Hussey's Witchfinder trilogy, starting with Dawn of the Demontide in 2010. The standalone novels Haunted, The Nightmare Eater and Jekyll's Mirror followed.

Hussey returned in 2020 with the publication of Hideous Beauty, a young adult (YA) romance novel, via Usborne Books. Hideous Beauty was shortlisted for a CrimeFest Award and a Diverse Book Award. His dystopian YA novel The Outrage was published in 2021 and also shortlisted for a CrimeFest Award.

Via a three-book deal in 2022, Zaffre (a Bonnier Books imprint) acquired the rights to publish Hussey's adult thriller Killing Jericho in 2023, while he reunited with Usborne Books for the publication of YA rom com Broken Hearts and Zombie Parts. Killing Jericho won the Fingerprint Award for Genre-Busting Crime Book of the Year and was shortlisted for Theakston Old Peculier Crime Novel of the Year Award and the Polari Prize. The third installment in the Killing Jericho trilogy titled Burying Jericho was longlisted for the CWA Ian Fleming Steel Dagger.

Hussey moved to Andersen Press in 2024 for the publication of The Boy I Love in 2025, a World War I romance.The Boy I Love was shortlisted for the Carnegie Medal and the YA Book Prize.

== Personal life ==
Hussey is gay. He married photographer and artist Chris White at Goldsborough Hall in spring 2026.

== Publications ==
=== Witchfinder ===
- Dawn of the Demontide. Oxford: Oxford University Press. 2010. ISBN 978-0-19-273190-6. OCLC 605930803.
- Gallows at Twilight. Oxford: Oxford University Press. 2011. ISBN 978-0-19-273191-3. OCLC 701555781.
- The Last Nightfall. Oxford: Oxford University Press. 2011. ISBN 978-0-19-273192-0. OCLC 751711528.

=== Killing Jericho ===
- Killing Jericho. London: Zaffre. 2023. ISBN 9781804181171.
- Jericho's Dead. London: Zaffre. 2024. ISBN 9781804181652.
- Burying Jericho. London. 2025. ISBN 9781804181669.

=== Standalone novels ===
- Through a Glass, Darkly (2008)
- The Absence (2009)
- Haunted. Oxford University Press. 2013. ISBN 978-0-19-273250-7. OCLC 868158844.
- The Nightmare Eater. London. 2013. ISBN 978-1-4451-2311-0. OCLC 852807691.
- Jekyll's Mirror. Oxford. 2015. ISBN 978-0-19-273251-4. OCLC 953453498.
- Hideous Beauty. London: Usborne. 2020. ISBN 9781474966177.
- The Outrage. London: Usborne. 2021. ISBN 9781474966184.
- Broken Hearts and Zombie Parts. London: Usborne. 2023. ISBN 9781803700038.
- The Boy I Love. London: Andersen Press. 2025. ISBN 9781839134821.

=== Short stories ===
- "Turn Her Face to the Wall" (2013)

== Accolades ==
Year	Award	Category	Title	Result	Ref.
2021	CrimeFest	Best Crime Fiction Novel for Young Adults	Hideous Beauty	Shortlisted	
2021	Diverse Book Awards	Young Adult	Hideous Beauty	Shortlisted	
2022	CrimeFest	Best Crime Fiction Novel for Young Adults	The Outrage	Shortlisted	
2024	Fingerprint Awards	Genre-Busting Crime Book of the Year	Killing Jericho	Won	
2024	Theakston Old Peculier Crime Novel of the Year Award		Killing Jericho	Shortlisted	
2024	Polari Prize	Book of the Year	Killing Jericho	Shortlisted	
2026	Crime Writers' Association (CWA) Awards	Steel Dagger	Burying Jericho	Longlisted	
2026	Carnegie Medal		The Boy I Love	Shortlisted	
2026	YA Book Prize		The Boy I Love	Pending	
