= Sir Edward Hussey, 1st Baronet =

English politician

Sir Edward Hussey, 1st Baronet (10 October 1585 – 22 March 1648) was an English politician who sat in the House of Commons of England in 1640. He supported the Royalist side in the English Civil War.

Hussey was the son of Charles Hussey of Honington and his wife Ellen Birch. He was created a Baronet, of Honington in the County of Lincolnshire on 19 June 1611. In 1618 he was High Sheriff of Lincolnshire and had the role again in 1638.

In April 1640, Hussey was elected Member of Parliament for Lincolnshire in the Short Parliament.

Hussey fought for the King in the Civil War and was one of those disqualified from public office under the Treaty of Uxbridge.

== Family ==
Hussey married Elizabeth Anton, daughter of George Anton of Lincoln and had four sons and five daughters. Hussey was succeeded in the baronetcy by his grandson Thomas. Another grandson William was an ambassador under William III.

Parliament of England
Vacant Parliament suspended since 1629	Member of Parliament for Lincolnshire; 1640; With: Sir John Wray, Bt	Succeeded by Sir John Wray, Bt; Sir Edward Ayscough
Baronetage of England
New creation	Baronet (of Honington); 1611–1648	Succeeded by Thomas Hussey
