= William Clive Hussey =

UK army officer

- Born: 1858
- Died: 20 June 1929 (aged 70–71)
- Military career
- Allegiance: United Kingdom
- Branch: British Army
- Service years: 1877–1897
- Rank: Major
- Unit: Royal Engineers
- Awards: Commander of The Royal Victorian Order
- Other work: Bailiff of The Royal Parks

Major William Clive Hussey, CVO (1858 – 20 June 1929) was a British Army officer who was bailiff of The Royal Parks from 1902 to 1923.

== Biography ==
Hussey was born in 1858, the second son of Edward Hussey (1807–1894), by his wife Honourable Henrietta Sarah Windsor-Clive (1820–1899). His father inherited Scotney Castle, in Lamberhurst, Kent, built the ′New′ Scotney Castle on the grounds, and was a Justice of the Peace and a Deputy Lieutenant of Kent. His mother was the elder daughter of Hon. Robert Clive (1789–1854), a Member of Parliament (UK) for the Conservative Party, and himself the younger son of the 1st Earl of Powis. Clive had married Hon. Harriet Windsor (1797–1869), who inherited the Plymouth estate of her brother the 6th Earl of Plymouth and was recognized as the 13th Baroness Windsor when that title was called out of abeyance in 1855. Among his siblings were Brigadier-General Arthur Herbert Hussey (1863–1923) and Mildred Harriet Hussey (1863–1952), wife of Sir Ralph William Anstruther, 6th Baronet.

Hussey grew up at Scotney Castle, and was educated at Eton and at the Royal Military Academy, Woolwich. He entered the army with commission as a lieutenant in the Royal Engineers on 19 June 1877. In 1882 he was appointed aide-de-camp to the Governor of Bermuda, and from 1884 to 1885 he served in the Bechuanaland Expedition. Promoted to captain on 1 April 1888, he was aide-de-camp to the Inspector-General of Fortifications from 1891 to 1897. He was promoted to the substantive rank of major while in this service, on 14 March 1896, and retired from active service in 1897.

He was appointed bailiff of The Royal Parks in 1902, and served as such until he retired in early 1923. The bailiff of the Royal Parks was responsible for the overall management of the royal parks of London, lands originally owned by the monarchy and officially designated public parks with the introduction of the Crown lands Act 1851. Among other duties, he was in charge of the keepers and civil officers in the parks, and he lived in a house inside Hyde Park.

Shortly before his retirement as bailiff, he was appointed a Commander of the Royal Victorian Order (CVO) in 1923.

== Family ==
Hussey married, in 1898, Mary Anne Herbert (d.1942), daughter of Very Rev. Hon. George Herbert (1825–1894), a son of the 2nd Earl of Powis, by his wife Elizabeth Beatrice Sykes (d.1883), daughter of Sir Tatton Sykes, 4th Baronet. They had one son and one daughter,

- Christopher Edward Clive Hussey (1899–1970)
- Barbara Winifred Hussey (b.1904)

Government offices
Preceded by Moreton John Wheatley	Bailiff of the Royal Parks; 1902–1923	Succeeded by Edward Dashwood Haggitt
