= Thomas Hussey (bishop) =

Irish cleric, educational leader and diplomat

Bishop Thomas Hussey (1746 – 11 July 1803) was a diplomat, chaplain and Bishop of the Roman Catholic Diocese of Waterford and Lismore from 1797 to his death. He is best known for taking part in talks with Richard Cumberland in an attempt to arrange a peace treaty between Spain and Britain during the American War of Independence.

== Early life ==
Hussey was born at Ballybogan, County Meath in 1746. The restrictions of the Penal Laws made Hussey go to the Irish College at Salamanca for his religious training. He joined the Trappists upon completion of his studies.

== Diplomatic career ==
Given Hussey's ability, the Pope requested him to take Holy Orders. Hussey was associated for a time with the court of the King of Spain and soon became prominent in Madrid. Around 1767 he was appointed chaplain to the Spanish embassy in London. In 1793 to 1796, shortly after the Roman Catholic Relief Act 1791 jas repealed some of the laws affecting Catholic worship, a chapel, St James's, Spanish Place, was built to designs by Joseph Bonomi. Hussey became rector of the chapel. Embassies that maintained their own Catholic chapels provided a safe place for the London Catholic community to worship, and many of them had a number of English-speaking chaplains on staff.

When the Spanish ambassador had to leave London because Spain took sides against Britain during the American War of Independence, Dr. Hussey became Spain's unofficial diplomatic contact. After discussions with the government of Lord North, Hussey was sent to Madrid to discuss Spain's withdrawal from the American cause. Upon his return to Madrid, he attracted the notice of English Catholics in exile and was deputed by the English Catholics to go to Rome to lay their position before the pope, but the Spanish embassy would not grant him leave of absence.

He was befriended by the Irish-born politician Edmund Burke in London. Hussey was elected a Fellow of the Royal Society in 1792.

== Maynooth and Waterford ==
George III, Pitt and the Duke of Portland entrusted him with a mission to the Irish soldiers and militia in Ireland who were disaffected, but when he heard their grievances, he pleaded in their behalf much to the distaste of the Irish executive. When he returned to Ireland, Hussey played a role in the establishment of Maynooth College and became its first president in 1795.

In 1797, he became the Bishop of the Diocese of Waterford and Lismore. Despite his earlier protest at Catholic soldiers being obliged to attend Dublin Castle services, the Protestant authorities honoured his consecration at St. Nicholas of Myra Church in Dublin with the presence of an armed detachment. He attracted widespread attention in 1797 by issuing a pastoral letter to his clergy that strongly resented government interference in ecclesiastical discipline and the proselytising of Protestants in Ireland by the establishment of religious schools.

== Death and burial ==
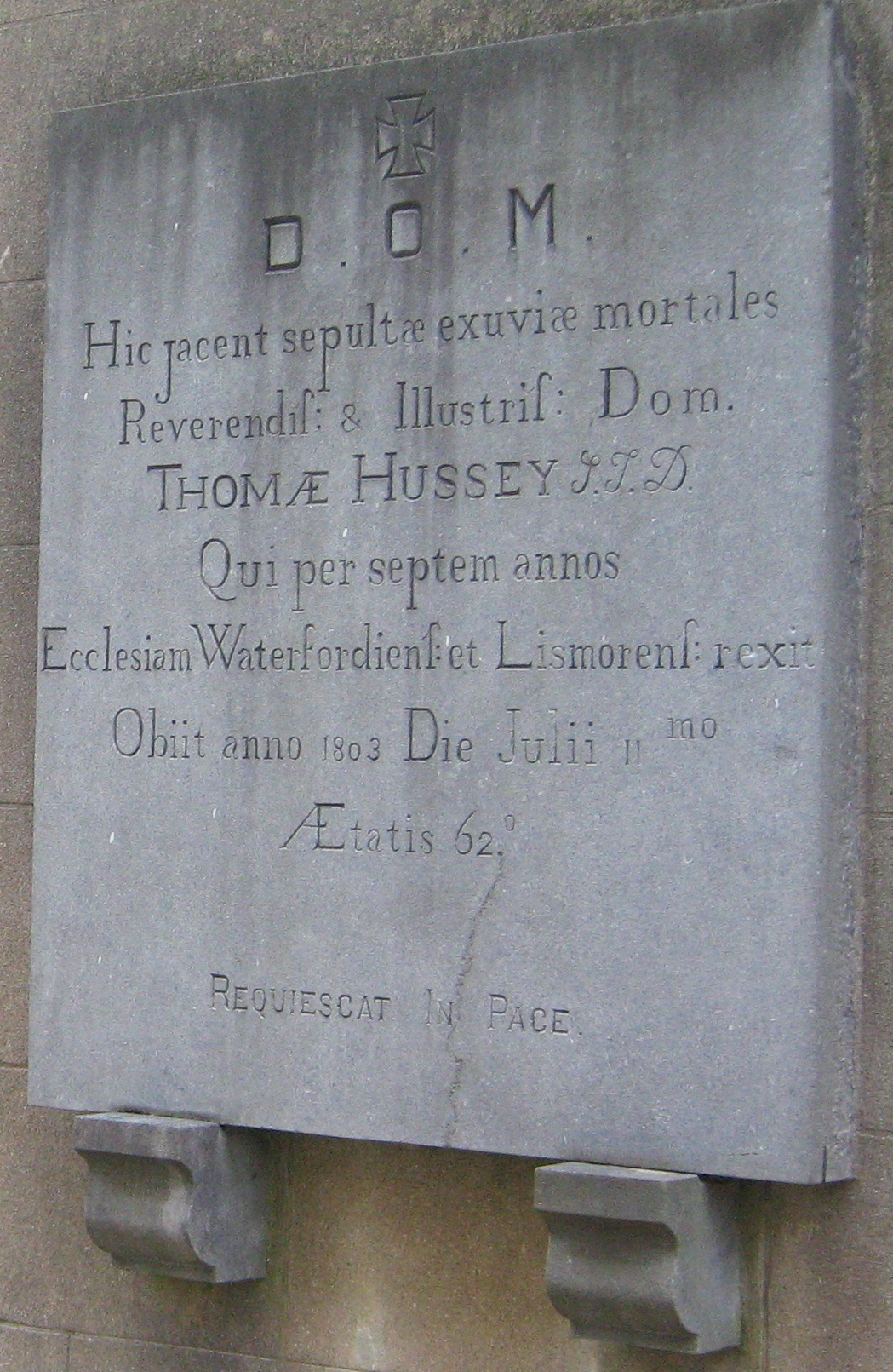
Tombstone of Thomas Hussey

Hussey officially opened the first monastery and school of Edmund Ignatius Rice at Mount Sion in Waterford on July 7, 1803. By now in his mid-fifties and in poor health, Hussey then settled his estate and had his will drawn up, which amongst other things dealt with the upkeep of Rice's education of Waterford's poor boys and ensured the survival of his fledgling religious congregation. After signing the will on July 10, Hussey went on a holiday to nearby Dunmore East. The next morning, he went with Dean Hearn for a swim but suffered an apoplectic fit and never regained consciousness.

Hussey's remains were brought back to Waterford for burial, but his funeral became the focus of sectarian violence. During the funeral procession to the Great Chapel, the coffin and Hussey's mourners were set upon by a group of drunken soldiers returning from an Orange Order meeting. The men abused the mourners and attempted to throw Bishop Hussey's remains into the River Suir, which runs through Waterford. A riot broke out, and the local militia were forced to intervene and recover the remains, which were eventually interred in the Great Chapel, as originally intended.

William Edward Hartpole Lecky described Hussey as "the ablest English-speaking bishop of his time".

== See also ==
- Roman Catholic Diocese of Waterford and Lismore
