= William Hussey (died 1570) =

English politician

William Hussey (1523/24 – 22 March 1570) was an English politician.

He was a member (MP) of the Parliament of England for Scarborough in 1555.
