= Thomas Hussey (Grantham MP) =

English politician

Thomas Hussey (died 25 March 1641) was an English politician who sat in the House of Commons in 1640.

Hussey was the son of Sir Edward Hussey, 1st Baronet, and his wife Elizabeth Anton, daughter of George Anton of Lincoln.

In November 1640, Hussey was elected Member of Parliament for Grantham in the Long Parliament. However, he died early in the following year.

Hussey married Rhoda Chapman, daughter of Thomas Chapman, of London. His son Sir Thomas Hussey, 2nd Baronet inherited the baronetcy. His son William was an ambassador under William III.

Parliament of England
Preceded by Henry Pelham; Edward Bashe	Member of Parliament for Grantham; 1640; With: Henry Pelham	Succeeded by Henry Pelham; Sir William Airmine, 1st Baronet
