= Tom Hussey (photographer) =

American photographer

Tom Hussey is an American photographer specialising in commercial advertising and lifestyle photography.

Hussey graduated from Southern Methodist University in 1987, where he earned a Bachelor of Fine Arts in Film Production with a minor in Photography. He carried out postgraduate work at the acclaimed School of Photographic Arts & Sciences at Rochester Institute of Technology and earned his Master of Fine Arts degree in Photography and Museum Practices, with an emphasis in Photographic Conservation.

While in Rochester, Hussey was actively involved with the Vietnam Veterans of America; Genesee Valley Chapter #20. He became friends with the men and women who were fighting in Vietnam during the 1960s and early 1970s. He pursued his Master of Fine Arts thesis on the subject of understanding veterans in the Vietnam War Era. Entitled "Ask Not What Your Country Can Do For You," the thesis detailed his exhibition of photographs and writings relating directly to a group of Vietnam War Veterans from the Rochester, New York, area. Thirty-six black and white photographs and thirty-six personal writings were displayed during Hussey's gallery exhibit at The Center at High Falls, Rochester Room Gallery from November 4–28, 1994.

Hussey has worked on accounts for a diverse range of clients on a local, national and international level. In 2010, his "Reflections" campaign for Pharmaceutical drug company Novartis's Exelon patch won a Gold Addy Award from the American Advertising Federation and was featured in Communication Arts 2010 Photography Annual.

In September 2011, Hussey was the only American to be named in the top 10 of Adweek's top 100 (out of more than 2,760) illustrator, graphic artist, art director, design shop, photographer and student portfolios.

In addition to his commercial shooting, Hussey has taught photography on the college level at the Rochester Institute of Technology in New York and Texas A&M University-Commerce and worked in the Conservation Laboratory at the International Museum of Photography at George Eastman House.

== Litigation ==
Hussey has become an aggressive copyright enforcer, bringing lawsuits against many people and businesses, primarily for his Reflections series images. He has been accused of being a copyright troll. In some suits, he has settled for as little as $750, while others he has managed to settle for thousands.
