= Henry Hussey (died 1557) =

English politician

Sir Henry Hussey (c.1515 – 18 August 1557) was an English soldier and politician.

Hussey was the eldest son of Henry Hussey and Eleanor Bradbridge. He was admitted to the Inner Temple on 16 February 1535.

In 1542, Hussey served as a captain under Thomas Howard, 3rd Duke of Norfolk in a campaign in Scotland. Five years later, he accompanied Edward Seymour, 1st Duke of Somerset in the Rough Wooing, and was present at the Battle of Pinkie. He was also knighted by the Duke on 1 October 1547 for his conduct in the campaign.

In 1547, he was appointed a justice of the peace for Sussex. The same year, he was elected as a Member of Parliament for New Shoreham, likely under the patronage of Henry Fitzalan, 12th Earl of Arundel. In October 1553, Hussey was elected to represent Lewes, followed by Gatton in 1555, and finally Horsham in March 1553.

On the 25 June 1546, Hussey married Bridget, the wealthy widow of William Erneley and a daughter of Thomas Spring of Lavenham.
