= William Hussey (MP for Stamford) =

English politician

Sir William Hussey (by 1473 – by February 1531) was an English politician.

William Hussey was the second son of Sir William Hussey of Sleaford, Lincolnshire. His elder brother was John Hussey, 1st Baron Hussey of Sleaford.

He was a Member (MP) of the Parliament of England for Stamford in 1512.

On 16 August 1513, at Tournai, after the Battle of the Spurs, he and his brother John were promoted to Knights Banneret by Henry VIII. He returned to France in 1520 in company with other knights to attend on Henry VIII at his meeting with Francis I of France at the Field of the Cloth of Gold. This was followed by a mission to the Archduke Ferdinand in 1523 and his appointment as (financial) comptroller of Calais early in 1526.

== Family ==
Before August 1503, Sir William Hussey married Anne Salveyn, daughter and heiress of Sir John Salveyn of Thorpe Salvin, Yorkshire. Their son George Hussey married Anne Constable, a daughter of Robert Constable of Flamborough.
