= William Hussey (judge) =

English lawyer and judge (1443–1495)

Sir William Hussey
- Born: 1443
- Died: 8 September 1495 (aged 51–52)
- Buried: Sempringham, Lincolnshire, England
- Spouse: Elizabeth Berkeley
- Issue: John Hussey, 1st Baron Hussey of Sleaford; Sir Robert Hussey; Sir William Hussey; Elizabeth Hussey; Mary Hussey
- Father: John Hussey
- Mother: Elizabeth Nesfield (or Neffield)

Sir William Hussey (or Huse or Husee) of Sleaford, Lincolnshire, SL (1443 – 8 September 1495) was an English lawyer who served as Attorney General and as Chief Justice of the King's Bench.

== Family ==
Hussey was the son of John Hussey (or Huse or Husee) of Old Sleaford, Lincolnshire, and his wife, Elizabeth Nesfield (or Neffield), of Yorkshire.

== Career ==
He was a member of Gray's Inn, and on 16 June 1471 was appointed Attorney General, with full power of deputing clerks and officers under him in courts of record. As Attorney General he conducted the impeachment of the Duke of Clarence for treason. In Trinity term of 1478 he was made a Serjeant-at-Law, and on 7 May 1481 was appointed Chief Justice of the King's Bench, in succession to Sir Thomas Billing, at a salary of 140 marks a year. This appointment was renewed at the ascension of each of the next three kings, and under Henry VII, he was also a commissioner to decide the claims made to fill various offices at the coronation.

In the first year of this reign, he successfully protested against the king's practice of consulting the judges beforehand upon crown cases which they were subsequently to try. In June 1492, he was a commissioner to treat with the ambassadors of the King of France. He died 8 September 1495, and was buried at Sempringham. On 24 November of that year, Sir John Fineux succeeded him as Chief Justice.

== Marriage and issue ==
About 1474, Sir William Hussey married Elizabeth Berkeley (c. 1453 – 1504), daughter of Sir Thomas Berkeley of Wymondham, Leicestershire, and wife Petronella Brokesby or Brooksby. They had three sons and two daughters:

- John Hussey, 1st Baron Hussey of Sleaford (1476–1537), eldest son and heir, who married firstly Margaret Blount and secondly Lady Anne Grey.
- Sir Robert Hussey of Linwood, Lincolnshire (1483 – 20 May 1546), second son, who married firstly Anne Saye and secondly Jane Stydolf. By his first wife he had a son, Sir Charles Hussey. By his second wife he had a daughter, Elizabeth Hussey, who was the 'Mistress Crane' involved in the printing of the Marprelate tracts. From Sir Robert Hussey descend the Hussey family of Honnington, Leicestershire (see Hussey Baronets).
- Sir William Hussey (d. 1531), who married Anne Salvaine, the daughter and heiress of Sir John Salvaine of Thorpe, Yorkshire.
- Elizabeth Hussey (d. Ampthill, 19 November 1516, bur. Warden Abbey), who married Richard Grey, 3rd Earl of Kent, but died without issue.
- Mary Hussey (1484), who married William Willoughby, 11th Baron Willoughby de Eresby (d. 1525), without issue.
