= Thomas Hussey (died by 1576) =

English politician

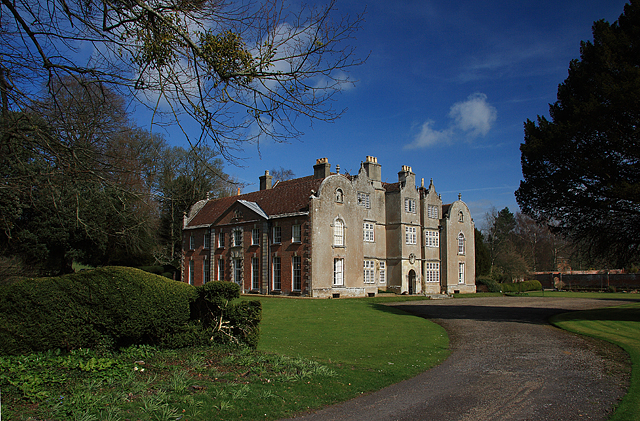
The Hussey household of Edmondsham House

Thomas Hussey (c. 1520 – by 1576) was an English gentleman and landowner, serving from time to time as a member of the Parliament of England.

He was a member (MP) of the parliament of England for Peterborough in 1558, St Ives in 1559, Weymouth in 1571 and Weymouth and Melcombe Regis in 1572.
