= Baron Hussey =

Extinct barony in the Peerage of England

The barony of Hussey has been created three times in the Peerage of England. Of these, one creation is abeyant while the other two are extinct or forfeited respectively.

The first creation was in 1295, for Henry Hussey. This creation became abeyant in 1470 on the death of the 7th baron. The second creation was in 1348, for Roger Hussey, but he had no legal heirs and the title became extinct on his death in 1361. The third creation was in 1529 for a different John Hussey, but he was attainted in 1537 and the peerage was forfeited.

== Barons Hussey, first creation (1295) ==
- Henry Hussey, 1st Baron Hussey (1265–1332)
- Henry Hussey, 2nd Baron Hussey (1302–1349) Son of 1st Baron
- Henry Hussey, 3rd Baron Hussey (d. 1349) Grandson of 1st Baron, Son of Mark Hussey and Margaret Verdun
- Henry Hussey, 4th Baron Hussey (d. 1384)
- Henry Hussey, 5th Baron Hussey (1362–1409)
- Henry Hussey, 6th Baron Hussey (d. 1460)
- Nicholas Hussey, 7th Baron Hussey (d. 1470) (abeyant)

== Barons Hussey, second creation (1348) ==
- Roger Hussey, 1st Baron Hussey of West Betchworth (d. 1361) (extinct)

== Barons Hussey of Sleaford, third creation (1529) ==
- John Hussey, 1st Baron Hussey of Sleaford (1465/1466–1537) (forfeit)

== See also ==
- Marmaduke Hussey, Baron Hussey of North Bradley
- Susan Hussey, Baroness Hussey of North Bradley
