= Henry Hussey, 2nd Baron Hussey =

English nobleman

Arms of Baron Hussey: Ermine, three bars gules.

Henry Hussey, 2nd Baron Hussey (1302 – 21 July 1349) was an English nobleman. He was the son of the 1st Baron Hussey and Isabel Hussey. "Sir Henry Huse, knight", was returned as Knight of the Shire for Dorset at the age of 30 in 1331/2. He was married circa 1314 to Maud. On their wedding day his father gave the bride and groom an estate in Kent. A son, named Mark Hussey, was born to Henry Hussey by Maud in about 1316.

He was later remarried to Katherine FitzAlan, daughter of Edmund FitzAlan, Earl of Arundel. Katherine was sister to Richard FitzAlan, later Earl of Arundel.

The children born to Henry Hussey by Katherine FitzAlan-Hussey were Elizabeth Hussey (circa 1318), Henry Hussey (circa 1320), and Richard Hussey (circa 1323). Katherine died in 1375, according to History of Gloucestershire. Her will was proved in 1376. According to Complete Peerage she had no issue by Henry and married secondly Sir Andrew Peverell. She made her will as his widow on Sunday after St. Luke's day 1375 at Ewhurst, desiring burial at the monastery of Lewes. She gave bequests to the shrine of St. Richard of Chichester, to the Friars of Lewes, and to the Friars of Arundel, et cetera, and mentioned her lord's "cousin" named "Andrew Peverell". and died before 23 May 1376.

In "Easter week, 1345" in Risley, Gloucestershire an inquisition determined that Henry Hussey held a moiety of Saperton manor and a moiety of Rusyndene manor in Gloucestershire, from the King by a knight's service. According to the Patent Records in 1348 Henry Hussey (with others) was commissioned "to determine whether a wall on a river flowing near the border of Kent and Sussex, near Knellesflote, should be dismantled."

Henry Hussey died on 1 July 1349 according to Complete Peerage. He left property in Gloucestershire, Sussex, Southampton, Surrey, Kent, and Wiltshire.

His son Mark Hussey married Margery de Verdun, daughter of Theobald de Verdun, 2nd Baron Verdun. Mark, however, predeceased his father, dying before 10 February 1345/6. When Sir Henry died, Henry Hussey, his grandson and son of Mark Hussey, was named as his next heir and stated to be aged six.

Sir Henry had three other children, however, and after Mark’s death, he, on 16 October 1347, had licence to settle the manor of Moreton in Berkshire and a moiety of the manors of Rissington and Sapperton in Gloucester on himself for life, with remainder to Henry, his son, in tail; to Richard, his son, in tail, and then to his heirs begotten of Katherine his wife in perpetuity, remainder to Elizabeth, his daughter, in tail, and to John de Huntingfield, whose relationship, if any, is not apparent, in fee.

His son Sir Henry Hussey married Ankaret Hussey, daughter of Roger le Strange, 4th Baron Strange.

Their granddaughter Mary married Henry Howard, son of John Howard.

His daughter Alice married John Dalton.

Peerage of England
Preceded by Henry Hussey	Baron Hussey; 1332–1349	Succeeded by Henry Hussey
