= Thomas Hussey (died 1468) =

English politician

Thomas Hussey (died 1468), of Shapwick, Dorset, was an English politician.

He was a member (MP) of the parliament of England for Great Bedwyn in 1421, for Old Sarum in 1423, for Melcombe Regis in 1427 and for Dorset in 1435.
