= Maelbrighte Ó Hussey =

Maelbrighte Ó Hussey (non-anglicised Maol Brighde Ó hEodhusa, in Latin, Brigidus Hossæus), known also as Bonaventura Hussey, Bonaventura Ó hEoghusa and Giolla Brighde Ó hEoghusa, was a Franciscan Friar, teacher, Gaelic-Irish poet and Catholic author, fl. 1608–1614.

== Biography ==
Ó hEodhusa was born in the Diocese of Clogher, in Ulster. Some details of Giolla Brighde survive. He was a member of the Ó hEoghusa family of Ulster. He arrived at Louvain in 1606 and was ordained there in 1608, where he took the name Bonaventura. He was associated with Flaithri Ó Maolconaire. The first definite information about him dates from 1 November 1607, on which day he became one of the original members of the Irish Franciscans at their college of St. Anthony at the University of Leuven in Flanders. It seems, however, that he had previously been at Douai in northern France. At Louvain, he lectured first in philosophy and afterwards in theology.

Ó hEodhusa remained as guardian of the college at Leuven until his death in 1614.

Franciscan historians praise Ó hEodhusa for his knowledge of the history and language of Ireland.

== Writings ==
His works were all written in Irish, and one of his writings, "A Christian Catechism" (Leuven, 1608), was the first book printed on the Continent in the Irish character. It was reprinted and revised several times.

Among his other works are to be mentioned:

- a metrical abridgment in 240 verses of the Catholic Catechism
- a poem for a friend who had fallen into heresy
- a poem on the author entering the Order of St. Francis
- three or four poems preserved in manuscript in the British Museum and the Royal Irish Academy.

A letter in Irish from him to Robert Nugent, the superior of the Irish Jesuits, is printed in E. Hogan's "Hibernia Ignatiana" (p. 167).

== See also ==
- Aengus Ó hEodhasa
