= Gemma Hussey =

Irish politician (1938–2024)

- Hussey, c. 1980s

Minister for Social Welfare
- In office 14 February 1986 – 10 March 1987
- Taoiseach: Garret FitzGerald
- Preceded by: Barry Desmond
- Succeeded by: Michael Woods

Minister for Labour
- In office 20 January 1987 – 10 March 1987
- Taoiseach: Garret FitzGerald
- Preceded by: Ruairi Quinn
- Succeeded by: Bertie Ahern

Minister for Education
- In office 14 December 1982 – 14 February 1986
- Taoiseach: Garret FitzGerald
- Preceded by: Gerard Brady
- Succeeded by: Patrick Cooney

Leader of the Seanad
- In office 8 October 1981 – 26 March 1982
- Taoiseach: Garret FitzGerald
- Preceded by: Eoin Ryan Snr
- Succeeded by: Eoin Ryan Snr

Leader of Fine Gael in the Seanad
- In office 8 October 1981 – 26 March 1982
- Leader: Garret FitzGerald
- Preceded by: Patrick Cooney
- Succeeded by: James Dooge

Teachta Dála
- In office February 1982 – June 1989
- Constituency: Wicklow

Senator
- In office 27 October 1977 – 18 February 1982
- Constituency: National University

Personal details
- Born: Gemma Moran; 11 November 1938 Bray, County Wicklow, Ireland
- Died: 26 November 2024 (aged 86) Dublin, Ireland
- Party: Fine Gael
- Spouse: Derry Hussey (m. 1976; died 2020)
- Children: 3
- Education: University College Dublin

Gemma Hussey (née Moran; 11 November 1938 – 26 November 2024) was an Irish Fine Gael politician who served as Minister for Social Welfare from 1986 to 1987, Minister for Labour from January 1987 to March 1987, Minister for Education from 1982 to 1986, Leader of the Seanad and Leader of Fine Gael in the Seanad from 1981 to 1982. She served as a Teachta Dála (TD) for the Wicklow constituency from 1982 to 1989. She also served as a Senator for the National University from 1977 to 1982.

Hussey made history as Ireland's first female Minister for Education and Fine Gael's first female Cabinet minister. During her tenure in education from 1982 to 1986, she introduced lasting reforms, such as the establishment of aural and oral exams and the creation of the National Parents Council. An advocate for women’s rights, Hussey worked to increase female representation in politics and highlighted gender issues in broadcasting as a member of the Working Party on Women in Broadcasting. Additionally, Hussey campaigned throughout the 1980s for the legalisation of divorce, a highly divisive issue at the time. In 2011, the Times summarised Huessy ideologically as a "heavyweight Blueshirt Liberal".

After leaving electoral politics in 1989, she became actively involved in the European Women’s Federation, encouraging women from former Eastern Bloc countries to engage in political life for the first time. She was a committed Europhile and supporter of the European Union. Hussey was also a published author, writing At the Cutting Edge: Cabinet Diaries 1982–1987 and Ireland Today: An Anatomy of a Changing State, offering insights into Irish politics and societal changes.

== Early life ==
Gemma Moran was born in Bray, County Wicklow, in 1938. She was educated at Loreto College, Foxrock and at University College Dublin. Hussey had a successful career running a language school in the late 1960s and 1970s. She married Derry Hussey in 1964, and they had 3 children. Derry Hussey died in 2020.

== Political activism ==
From 1973 onwards, Hussey was a key member of the Women's Political Association, a non-partisan organisation which focused on increasing women's representation in Irish politics.

== Political career ==
=== Senator ===
She was elected by the National University to Seanad Éireann, serving in the upper house of the Oireachtas, from 1977 until 1982. She sat as an Independent Senator for the first three years, before joining Fine Gael. She then served as Fine Gael Seanad Spokesperson on Women's Affairs from 1981 to 1982. She went on to be the party leader in the Seanad and leader of the Seanad from 1981 to 1982.

Hussey played a role in advocating for gender equality within Irish media, particularly focusing on RTÉ. Serving on the Working Party on Women in Broadcasting, Hussey presented a significant 1980 submission to the RTÉ Authority and senior management. Her report addressed issues such as the stereotyping of women, sexism, and gender imbalance in Irish broadcasting, highlighting the need for reform in how women were represented in the media.

=== TD and Minister ===
She was first elected to Dáil Éireann on her second attempt, at the February 1982 general election, as a Fine Gael TD for Wicklow.

Hussey served as Minister for Education in the Fine Gael–Labour Party coalition government of Taoiseach Garret FitzGerald from 1982 to 1986, during which time she was heavily criticised by teachers' unions during a bitter pay strike in 1984. The 1980s was a decade of economic crisis and the government was faced with challenges caused by the precarious state of the public finances. This meant that she had to find ways to reduce the Education budget. One of her measures was to introduce charges for the school transport system, which proved unpopular. However, third-level enrolments were increasing rapidly and Hussey secured increased funding for higher education at a time of severe spending cutbacks. In 1986, she became Minister for Social Welfare. FitzGerald considered creating a new ministry for Hussey as Minister for EEC affairs. However, she did not wish to compete with the Department of Foreign Affairs, and so declined the position.

Always a liberal and a feminist, she took a strongly supportive position on the legalisation of divorce, which was defeated in a referendum in 1986, and frequently suggested that she supported the liberalisation of Ireland's abortion ban. A member of Fine Gael's liberal wing, which included Monica Barnes, Nuala Fennell, Alan Shatter and Alan Dukes, she was disliked by the conservative wing of the party which included TDs like Oliver J. Flanagan, Alice Glenn and Gerry L'Estrange.

During a meeting with Keith Joseph, British Secretary of State for Education, Joseph boasted to Hussey that he held surgeries once a month, which was considered a high number in Britain. Hussey responded that she had to do clinics three days every week to hold on to her seat as a TD.

The book of her cabinet diaries, At the Cutting Edge, published in 1990, was hailed as the most thorough and realistic account of life inside the cabinet in Ireland. She retired from politics at the 1989 general election.

== Outside of the Oirechtas ==
In 1990, she was sharply criticised within her party for suggesting that she might support the Labour Party presidential candidate, Mary Robinson, a feminist, over the official Fine Gael candidate Austin Currie. Mary Robinson went on to become Ireland's first female President.

An enthusiastic Europhile, Hussey spent a lot of her time promoting the advancement of women in politics around the European Union.

In the lead-up to the 1997 presidential election, Hussey was mentioned as a possible Fine Gael candidate and was predicted to do well across Dublin and in her native Wicklow constituency and among supporters of Fine Gael and of the Progressive Democrats. In the event the party nomination went to Mary Banotti, who lost to Mary McAleese in the election.

In 2015, during the public debates held before the 2015 referendum on Marriage Equality in Ireland, Hussey called for a yes vote, and also for the legislation of abortion.

Hussey died following a short illness on 26 November 2024, at the age of 86.

== Bibliography ==
- Hussey, Gemma: At the Cutting Edge: Cabinet Diaries, 1982–1987 (Dublin, 1990)
- Hussey, Gemma: Ireland Today: Anatomy of a Changing State (London, 1993)

Political offices
Preceded by Gerard Brady	Minister for Education; 1982–1986	Succeeded by Patrick Cooney
Preceded by Barry Desmond	Minister for Social Welfare; 1986–1987	Succeeded by Michael Woods
Preceded by Ruairi Quinn	Minister for Labour; 1987	Succeeded by Bertie Ahern

Dáil	Election	Deputy (Party)	Deputy (Party)	Deputy (Party)	Deputy (Party)	Deputy (Party)
4th	1923	Christopher Byrne (CnaG)	James Everett (Lab)	Richard Wilson (FP)	3 seats 1923–1981	
5th	1927 (Jun)	Séamus Moore (FF)	James Everett (Lab)	Dermot O'Mahony (CnaG)	3 seats 1923–1981	
6th	1927 (Sep)	Séamus Moore (FF)	James Everett (Lab)	Dermot O'Mahony (CnaG)	3 seats 1923–1981	
7th	1932	Séamus Moore (FF)	James Everett (Lab)	Dermot O'Mahony (CnaG)	3 seats 1923–1981	
8th	1933	Séamus Moore (FF)	James Everett (Lab)	Dermot O'Mahony (CnaG)	3 seats 1923–1981	
9th	1937	Séamus Moore (FF)	James Everett (Lab)	Dermot O'Mahony (FG)	3 seats 1923–1981	
10th	1938	Séamus Moore (FF)	James Everett (Lab)	Patrick Cogan (Ind.)	3 seats 1923–1981	
11th	1943	Christopher Byrne (FF)	James Everett (Lab)	Patrick Cogan (CnaT)	3 seats 1923–1981	
12th	1944	Thomas Brennan (FF)	James Everett (NLP)	Patrick Cogan (CnaT)	3 seats 1923–1981	
13th	1948	Thomas Brennan (FF)	James Everett (NLP)	Patrick Cogan (Ind.)	3 seats 1923–1981	
14th	1951	Thomas Brennan (FF)	James Everett (Lab)	Patrick Cogan (Ind.)	3 seats 1923–1981	
14th	1953 by-election	Mark Deering (FG)	James Everett (Lab)	Patrick Cogan (Ind.)	3 seats 1923–1981	
15th	1954	Mark Deering (FG)	James Everett (Lab)	Paudge Brennan (FF)	3 seats 1923–1981	
16th	1957	James O'Toole (FF)	James Everett (Lab)	Paudge Brennan (FF)	3 seats 1923–1981	
17th	1961	Michael O'Higgins (FG)	James Everett (Lab)	Paudge Brennan (FF)	3 seats 1923–1981	
18th	1965	Michael O'Higgins (FG)	James Everett (Lab)	Paudge Brennan (FF)	3 seats 1923–1981	
18th	1968 by-election	Michael O'Higgins (FG)	Godfrey Timmins (FG)	Paudge Brennan (FF)	3 seats 1923–1981	
19th	1969	Liam Kavanagh (Lab)	Godfrey Timmins (FG)	Paudge Brennan (FF)	3 seats 1923–1981	
20th	1973	Liam Kavanagh (Lab)	Godfrey Timmins (FG)	Ciarán Murphy (FF)	3 seats 1923–1981	
21st	1977	Liam Kavanagh (Lab)	Godfrey Timmins (FG)	Ciarán Murphy (FF)	3 seats 1923–1981	
22nd	1981	Liam Kavanagh (Lab)	Godfrey Timmins (FG)	Ciarán Murphy (FF)	Paudge Brennan (FF)	4 seats 1981–1992
23rd	1982 (Feb)	Liam Kavanagh (Lab)	Godfrey Timmins (FG)	Ciarán Murphy (FF)	Gemma Hussey (FG)	4 seats 1981–1992
24th	1982 (Nov)	Liam Kavanagh (Lab)	Godfrey Timmins (FG)	Paudge Brennan (FF)	Gemma Hussey (FG)	4 seats 1981–1992
25th	1987	Liam Kavanagh (Lab)	Joe Jacob (FF)	Dick Roche (FF)	Gemma Hussey (FG)	4 seats 1981–1992
26th	1989	Liam Kavanagh (Lab)	Joe Jacob (FF)	Dick Roche (FF)	Godfrey Timmins (FG)	4 seats 1981–1992
27th	1992	Liam Kavanagh (Lab)	Joe Jacob (FF)	Liz McManus (DL)	Godfrey Timmins (FG)	Johnny Fox (Ind.)
27th	1995 by-election	Liam Kavanagh (Lab)	Joe Jacob (FF)	Liz McManus (DL)	Godfrey Timmins (FG)	Mildred Fox (Ind.)
28th	1997	Dick Roche (FF)	Joe Jacob (FF)	Liz McManus (DL)	Billy Timmins (FG)	Mildred Fox (Ind.)
29th	2002	Dick Roche (FF)	Joe Jacob (FF)	Liz McManus (Lab)	Billy Timmins (FG)	Mildred Fox (Ind.)
30th	2007	Dick Roche (FF)	Joe Behan (FF)	Liz McManus (Lab)	Billy Timmins (FG)	Andrew Doyle (FG)
31st	2011	Simon Harris (FG)	Stephen Donnelly (Ind.)	Anne Ferris (Lab)	Billy Timmins (FG)	Andrew Doyle (FG)
32nd	2016	Simon Harris (FG)	Stephen Donnelly (SD)	John Brady (SF)	Pat Casey (FF)	Andrew Doyle (FG)
33rd	2020	Simon Harris (FG)	Stephen Donnelly (FF)	John Brady (SF)	Jennifer Whitmore (SD)	Steven Matthews (GP)
34th	2024	Simon Harris (FG)	Edward Timmins (FG)	John Brady (SF)	Jennifer Whitmore (SD)	4 seats since 2024
