= William Hussey (English diplomat) =

English ambassador to the Ottoman Empire

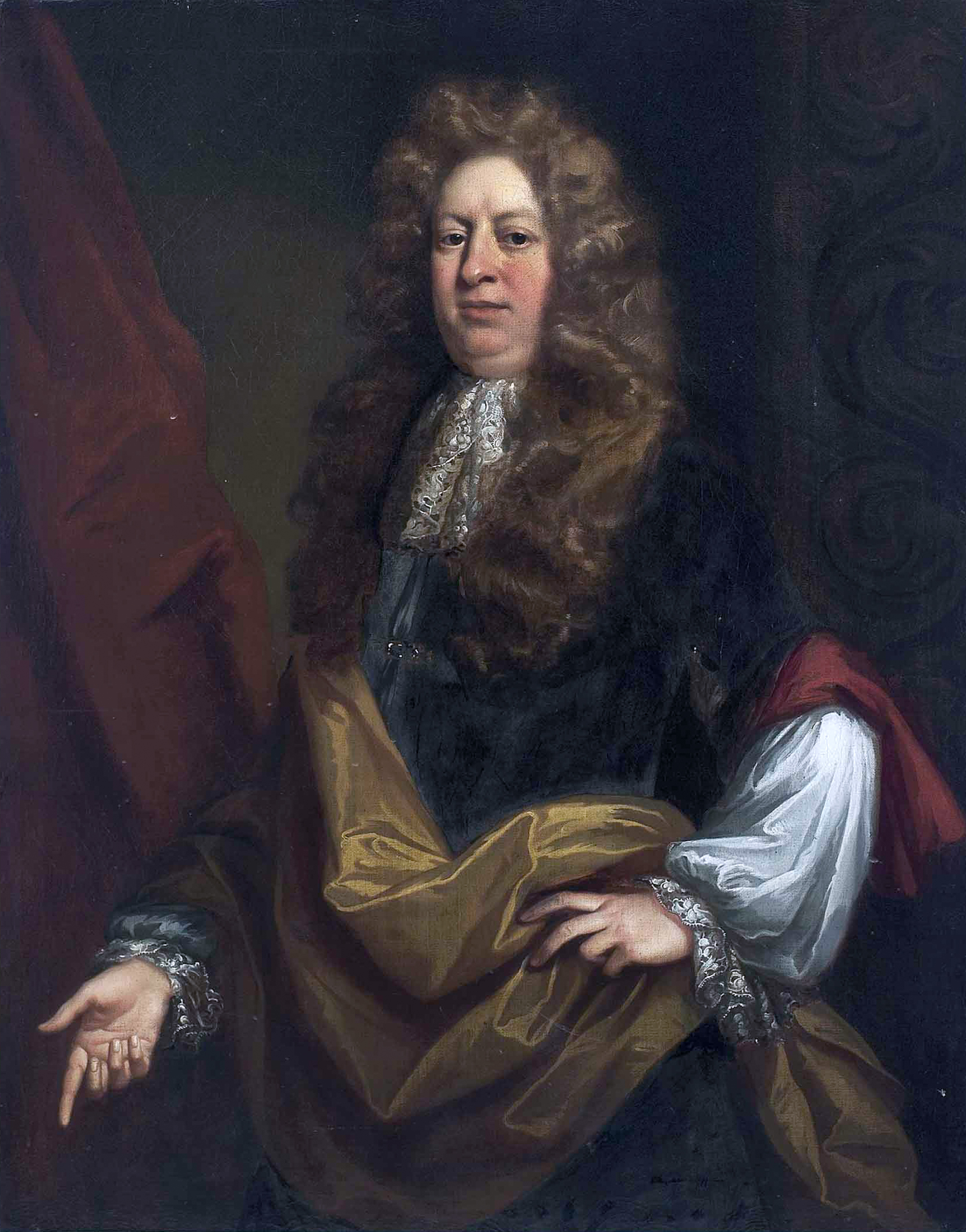
William Hussey (attributed to John Riley)

Sir William Hussey (1642–1691) was English ambassador to the Ottoman Empire.

Hussey was the son of Thomas Hussey and his wife Rhoda Chapman, daughter of Thomas Chapman, of London. He was a merchant and deputy-governor of the Levant Company. On 20 April 1690, the Levant Company elected. Travelling overland, he arrived at Vienna on 30 November. He left that city in April 1691 and was appointed by King William III as Ambassador to the Porte in Constantinople on 28 June, in time to mediate between the Ottomans and the Habsburg Empire. Hussey died on 14 September 1691 at Edirne, during the peace negotiations. His sarcophagus remains in the Edirne Museum.
