= Simon Grimsby (MP for Great Grimsby) =

English politician

Simon Grimsby (1367 – after 1407) from Grimsby, Lincolnshire, was an English politician.

Grimsby was Mayor of Grimsby in 1400–1402. He was a member (MP) of the parliament of England for Great Grimsby in 1407.

Parliament of England
Preceded by William Lele; John Kelby	Member of Parliament for Great Grimsby; 1407; With: William Fosse	Succeeded by William Fosse; John Thoresby
