= Sir William Wray, 1st Baronet, of Glentworth =

English Member of Parliament

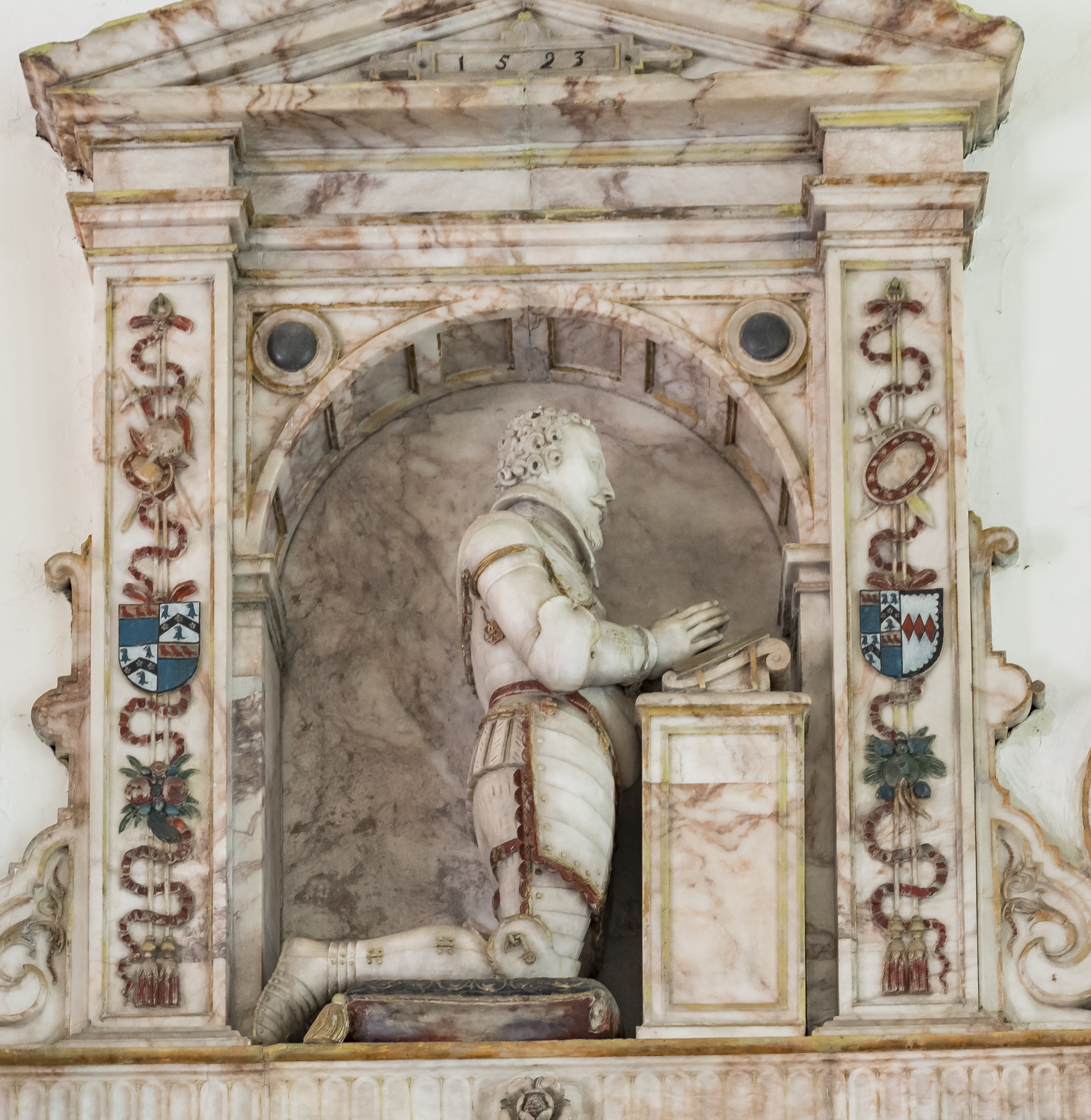
Effigy of Sir William Wray in Glentworth, Lincolnshire

Sir William Wray, 1st Baronet, of Glentworth, Lincolnshire (c. 1555 – 13 August 1617) was an English Member of Parliament.

== Early life ==
Wray was born in c. 1555. He was the son of Judge Christopher Wray, and Anne Girlington, a daughter of Nicholas Girlington of Normanby, Yorkshire.

== Career ==
He represented the constituency of Grimsby from 1584 to 1585, Lincolnshire in 1601 and Grimsby again from 1604 to November 1611. He was appointed High Sheriff of Lincolnshire in 1594 and was created a baronet on 25 November 1611.

Wray was a patron of religion. The Estate of the Church, with the Discourse of Times (1602), translated and expanded by Simon Patrick from Jean de Hainault was dedicated to him. John Smyth regarded Wray as the major supporter of "godly" religion in the county.

== Personal life ==
In 1580, he married Lucy Montagu, eldest daughter of Edward Montagu of Boughton and Elizabeth Harington, and grandson of the judge Sir Edward Montagu. Before her death, they had eight sons and a daughter:

- Sir John Wray, 2nd Baronet (1586–1655), who married Grisilla Bethell, only daughter of Sir Hugh Bethell of Ellerton, Yorkshire, in 1607.
- Nathaniel Wray (1591–1591) (d.s.p.), who died young.
- Philip Wray (b. 1596) (d.s.p.), who died young.
- Benjamin Wray (d.s.p.), who died young.
- Charles Wray (d.s.p.), who died young.
- Christopher Wray (d.s.p.), who died young.
- Nathaniel Wray (d. 1640, s.p.), who died young.
- Edward Wray (d. 1658), a Groom of the Bedchamber; he married Elizabeth Norris, who left an only daughter, Bridget, who became 4th Baroness Norreys in right of her mother.
- Elizabeth Wray (d. 1638), who married Sir Francis Foljambe, 1st Baronet in 1614.

Around 1600, Sir William remarried to Frances (née Drury), Lady Clifford, widow of Sir Nicholas Clifford of Bobbing, Kent, and daughter of Sir William Drury of Hawsted, Suffolk, and Elizabeth Stafford. With his second wife, he was the father of:

- Sir Christopher Wray (1601–1646) of Ashby and Barlings; he married Albinia Cecil, a daughter of Sir Edward Cecil (later 1st Viscount Wimbledon) in 1623.
- George Wray (1603–1606), who died young.
- Charles Wray (b. 1605), who was killed fighting in Spain.
- Frances Wray (b. 1610), who married Sir Anthony Irby of Boston, Lincolnshire, in 1623.

Sir William died on 13 August 1617. Monuments to Wray and his second wife, Frances (died 1647), and to Susanna Drury, sister of Frances, exist at St Peter's church Ashby cum Fenby.

Parliament of England
Preceded by Thomas Moryson; Thomas Grantham	Member of Parliament for Grimsby; 1584–1585; With: Thomas Moryson	Succeeded by Thomas Moryson; Tristram Tyrwhitt
Preceded by Thomas Monson; William Pelham	Member of Parliament for Lincolnshire; 1601; With: John Sheffield	Succeeded by John Sheffield; Thomas Clinton, Lord Clinton
Preceded by Thomas Clinton, Lord Clinton; Edward Skipwith	Member of Parliament for Grimsby; 1604–1611; With: Sir George St Paul	Succeeded by Sir John Wray; Richard Toothby
Baronetage of England
New creation	Baronet (of Glentworth); 1611–1617	Succeeded by John Wray
