= Robert Lord =

Robert Lord may refer to:

- Robert Lord (MP) (by 1495–1531 or later), MP for Great Grimsby
- Robert Lord (Australian politician) (1844–1878), Member of the Queensland Legislative Assembly
- Robert Lord (screenwriter) (1900–1976), American screenwriter and film producer
- Bob Lord (football chairman) (1908–1981), English businessman and chairman of Burnley F.C.
- Bob Lord (American football) (born 1930), American football coach
- Bobby Lord (1934–2008), American country musician
- Robert Lord (playwright) (1945–1992), New Zealand playwright and former Burns Fellow
- Bob Lord (swimmer) (born 1945), British swimmer
- Bob Lord (business executive) (born 1963), American business executive, President of AOL
- Rob Lord (musician) (born 1966), London based musician and composer
- Bob Lord (musician) (fl. 1989–2011), composer/producer
- Robert Lord (cricketer) (born 2001), English cricketer
