= Great Grimsby (constituency) =

Parliamentary constituency in the United Kingdom, until 2024

- Former borough constituency for the House of Commons
- 2010–2024 boundary of Great Grimsby in the former county of Humberside

- Location of the former county of Humberside within England
- County: Lincolnshire
- Electorate: 60,149 (December 2019)

1295–2024
- Seats: One (Two until 1832)
- Replaced by: Great Grimsby and Cleethorpes

Great Grimsby was a constituency (Note: A borough constituency (for the purposes of election expenses and type of returning officer)) (Note: As with all constituencies, the constituency currently elects one Member of Parliament (MP) by the first past the post system of election at least every five years.) in North East Lincolnshire represented in the House of Commons of the Parliament of the United Kingdom since December 2019 by Lia Nici of the Conservative Party. Between 1918 and 1983 it was known simply as Grimsby; following the 2023 Periodic Review of Westminster constituencies, the seat was subject to boundary changes, incorporating the neighbouring town of Cleethorpes. As a consequence, it was renamed Great Grimsby and Cleethorpes, first contested at the 2024 general election.

== Constituency profile ==
Fishing is a significant sector in Grimsby which is a deprived area. These factors meant the constituency voted strongly to leave the EU in 2016.

== Boundaries ==
Map of boundaries 2010–2024

The constituency followed the boundaries of the old Borough of Great Grimsby, which was abolished when the former county of Humberside was divided into four unitary authorities in 1996. From the 2010 general election new boundaries took effect, but the Boundary Commission's review led only to minimal changes, aligning the constituency boundaries with updated ward boundaries.

The seat consisted of the following electoral wards of the Borough of North East Lincolnshire:

- East Marsh, Freshney, Heneage, Park, Scartho, South, West Marsh and Yarborough.

== History ==
The constituency has been represented since the first House of Commons was assembled in the Model Parliament of 1295, and it elected two MPs until 1832. Great Grimsby was established as a parliamentary borough in 1295, sending two burgesses, and has been continuously represented ever since. The town of Grimsby in Lincolnshire, a market town, fishing port and seaport.

Freemen of the town had the right to vote, provided they were resident and paying scot and lot; in 1831 this amounted to just under 400 voters. The town corporation bestowed this status, as today, rarely on those bringing acclaim to the place, but it was routinely acquired through apprenticeship in the guilds and by inheritance; in Great Grimsby, unusually, the husband of a freeman's daughter or widow acquired the freedom. (Note: Not only were sons of freemen considered freemen)

In 1831, when the Reform Bill was being discussed in Parliament, the wives and daughters of the Great Grimsby freemen petitioned the House of Lords to retain their rights to pass on the vote to their future husbands and children. However, their concern to retain these rights may not have been rooted in any their family desiring to help choose the borough's MPs as a vote in Great Grimsby was a valuable commodity in a more mercenary sense, and the contemporary polemicist Oldfield considered that "This borough stands second to none in the history of corruption." At the start of the 18th century, it was noted that Grimsby's "freemen did enter into treaties with several gentlemen in London, for sale of the choice of burgess to such as would give the most money". In 1701, the House of Commons overturned the election of one of Great Grimsby's MPs, William Cotesworth, for bribery and sent him to the Tower of London and temporarily suspended the borough's right to representation. Almost every election in Great Grimsby at this period was followed by a petition from defeated candidates alleging bribery, although that of 1701 seems to have been the only one which was acted upon.

Great Grimsby, like most boroughs except for the very largest, recognised a "patron" who could generally exercise influence over the choice of its MPs; at the time of the Great Reform Act 1832, this was Lord Yarborough. However, the extent of the patron's power was limited in Great Grimsby, and the voters were quite prepared (at a price) to defy his advice. The patron could strengthen his position by providing employment to the freemen, as could his rivals. Jupp quotes two letters, one of 1818 and one of 1819, in which local agents advise the Tennyson family how best to do this in Grimsby so as to encroach on Lord Yarborough's influence:

"Build upon every spot of vacant ground you are possessed of... Thus you would give employment to a great number of freemen... Let Mr Heneage's estates (Note: See three MPs which that name, in 1496 and throughout the 19th century including one elevated to Baron Heneage) be divided into fields of four or six acres; and let these, together with your own estates be placed in the hands of freemen to whom they would be an object of importance. Provide, if possible, small farms for the sons of Lord Yarbro's tenants".

On a less extravagant level, it is recorded that after Charles Tennyson was first elected in 1818 he presented a bottle of wine to each of the fathers of 92 local children about to be christened.

The General Election of 1831 in Grimsby was as notorious as in some of the rotten boroughs, the local Tories being accused of using a revenue cutter lying in the Humber to ply the Whig voters with drink and prevent them getting to the polls; the fact of the outcome standing led to a nationally well-known action by John Shelley for libel.

In 1831, the population of the borough was 4,008, and contained 784 houses. The Boundary Act in concert with the Reform Act 1832 enlarged the borough to include eight neighbouring parishes (Note: Including Cleethorpes and Great Coates), brought the population up to 6,413 with 1,365 houses but the landed property aspect to the franchise was not reformed so this increased the electorate only to 656 so Great Grimsby lost one of its two seats. However, Grimsby's population and housing continued to grow and, unlike most of the boroughs that lost one seat in 1832, it has retained its existence, without taking up large swathes of the county.

The constituency underwent further significant boundary change in 1918 and 1950. In 1918, parishes that had joined, (Bradley, Great Coates, Little Coates, Laceby, Waltham, Weelsby and the adjoining neighbourhood/parish of Scartho) were detached to be added to Louth county constituency, and the seat (Note: From 1918 Grimsby rather than Great Grimsby) consisted of the county borough of Grimsby and the urban district (later borough) of Cleethorpes. In 1950, Cleethorpes was moved into the Louth county division, leaving the borough once more as Grimsby alone. More recent boundary changes have only been adjustments to conform to changes at local government level.

Labour's Austin Mitchell retained the seat in 1977 by only 520 votes in a by-election following the death of the Foreign Secretary Tony Crosland. He held the seat until retiring in 2015. At the 2010 election, Mitchell's majority was again reduced to three figures, after a swing of over 10% to the Conservatives.

At the 2015 election, Great Grimsby was considered a target for the United Kingdom Independence Party (UKIP). UKIP had selected as their candidate the 2010 Conservative candidate, Victoria Ayling, who had switched parties since the previous election. Labour's candidate was Melanie Onn, while the Conservatives stood Marc Jones. In the event however, Onn was successful, increasing Mitchell's majority of 714 more than sixfold and enjoying a swing of 5.6% from the Conservatives, with UKIP finishing third, just 57 votes behind the Conservatives. The Conservative and UKIP votes combined outnumbered the Labour vote, which was an indication that the Labour position was potentially precarious.

Similarly to many other traditionally working class Labour strongholds – labelled the "Red Wall" – in the North of England, in 2019, Great Grimsby was won by the Conservatives for the first time since 1935.

== Members of Parliament ==
=== MPs 1295–1660 ===
| Year | First member | Second member |
|---|---|---|
| 1330 | Edmundus Rayner | Robertus Keilby |
| 1341 | Johannes de Grymesby | |
| 1346 | Peter de la See | |
| 1355 | Johannes de Grymesby | |
| 1365 | Willielmus Grymesby | |
| 1372 | Johannes de Grymesby | |
| 1377 | Willielmus Wele | |
| 1379 | Willielmus Grymesby | |
| 1382 | Willielmus Grymesby | |
| 1383 | Petrus de Gryesby | |
| 1385 | Willielmus Wele | |
| 1386 | John Newland | William Elmsall |
| 1388 (Feb) | Robert Burton | William Paule |
| 1388 (Sep) | Geoffrey Askeby | Richard Barber |
| 1390 (Jan) | Richard Misen | Walter Slotheby |
| 1390 (Nov) | | |
| 1391 | John Hesilden | William Welle |
| 1393 | Robert Burton | John Kelby |
| 1394 | Robert Burton | Walter Slotheby |
| 1395 | Robert Burton | William Elmsall |
| 1397 (Jan) | Robert Burton | John Kelby |
| 1397 (Sep) | | |
| 1399 | Walter Slotheby | William Elmsall |
| 1401 | | |
| 1402 | Richard White | John Kelby |
| 1404 (Jan) | | |
| 1404 (Oct) | William Hosier | John Miles |
| 1406 | William Lele | John Kelby |
| 1407 | William Fosse | Simon Grimsby |
| 1411 | William Fosse | John Thoresby |
| 1413 (Feb) | | |
| 1413 (May) | Gilbert Keremond | Richard Duffield |
| 1414 (Apr) | | |
| 1414 (Nov) | Roger Dale | Richard Duffield |
| 1415 | | |
| 1416 (Mar) | Roger Dale | Gilbert Keremond |
| 1416 (Oct) | | |
| 1417 | | |
| 1419 | | |
| 1420 | John Lufford | Richard Duffield |
| 1421 (May) | Simon Elkyngton | Roger Grainsby |
| 1421 (Dec) | Roger Dale | Richard Duffield |
| 1410 | | |
| 1448 | Willielmus Grymesby | |
| 1472 | Willielmus Grymesby | Hugo Eden |
| 1483 | Hugo Eden | Peter de la See |
| 1485 | Stephen de la See | |
| 1485 | John Saynton | Thomas Pormard |
| 1487 | John Saynton | John Moigne |
| 1494 | Hugo Eden | |
| 1496 | John Heneage | |
| 1509 | Sir Robert Tyrwhitt | |
| 1510 | Sir William Tyrwhitt | Sir Robert Wingfield |
| 1512 | George Barnardiston | Robert Vicars |
| 1515 | Philip Hamby | William Hatcliffe |
| 1523 | John Heneage | Robert Lord |
| 1529 | Sir William Askew | John Heneage |
| 1536 | ? | |
| 1539 | ? | |
| 1542 | Richard Goodrich | ? |
| 1545 | Thomas Hussey | Richard Goodrich |
| 1547 | Richard Goodrich | John Bellow |
| 1553 (Mar) | ? | |
| 1553 (Oct) | George Heneage | John Bellow |
| 1554 (Apr) | Ambrose Sutton | John Bellow |
| 1554 (Nov) | John Bellow | Thomas Constable |
| 1555 | John Bellow | Thomas Constable |
| 1558 | John Bellow | Marmaduke Tyrwhitt |
| 1558–9 | Sir Edward Warner | John Bellow |
| 1562–3 | Christopher Wray | Edward Fitzgerald |
| 1571 | Thomas St Poll | John Thymbleby |
| 1572 | Thomas Moryson | Thomas Grantham |
| 1584 (Nov) | William Wray | Thomas Moryson |
| 1586 (Oct) | Tristram Tyrwhitt | Thomas Moryson |
| 1588–9 | Thomas Moryson | Tristram Tyrwhitt |
| 1593 | William Barne | Nicholas Saunderson |
| 1597 (Sep) | Thomas Hatcliffe | Thomas Ellis |
| 1601 (Oct) | Thomas Clinton alias Fiennes, Lord Clinton | Edward Skipwith |
| 1604 | Sir William Wray | Sir George St Paul |
| 1614 | Sir John Wray | Richard Toothby |
| 1621 | Henry Pelham | Sir Christopher Wray |
| 1624 | Henry Pelham | Sir Christopher Wray |
| 1625 | Henry Pelham | Sir Christopher Wray |
| 1626 | Henry Pelham | William Skinner |
| 1628 | Henry Pelham | Christopher Wray |
| 1629–1640 | No parliaments summoned | |
| April 1640 | Christopher Wray | Sir Gervase Hollis |
| November 1640 | Christopher Wray | Sir Gervase Holles |
| 1645 | William Wray | Edward Rossiter |
| 1654 | William Wray | One seat only |
| 1656 | William Wray | One seat only |
| 1659 | William Wray | Edward Ayscough |

=== MPs 1660–1832 ===
| Year | First member | First party | Second member | Second party |
|---|---|---|---|---|
| 1660 | Edward King | | William Wray | |
| 1661 | Gervase Holles | | Adrian Scrope | |
| 1666 | Gervase Holles | | Sir Henry Belasyse, killed in duel, 1667 | Royalist |
| October 1667 | Gervase Holles | | Sir Philip Tyrwhitt | |
| November 1667 | Gervase Holles | | Sir Frescheville Holles | |
| 1673 | Gervase Holles | | William Broxholme | |
| 1675 | Sir Christopher Wray | | William Broxholme | |
| 1679 | George Pelham | | William Broxholme | |
| 1685 | Sir Edward Ayscough | | Sir Thomas Barnardiston | Whig |
| 1690 | Sir Edward Ayscough | | John Chaplin | |
| 1695 | Sir Edward Ayscough | | Arthur Moore | |
| 1699 | Thomas Vyner | | Arthur Moore | |
| January 1701 | Thomas Vyner | | William Cotesworth | |
| March 1701 | Thomas Vyner | | Seat vacant | |
| December 1701 | Arthur Moore | | Seat vacant | |
| 1702 | Arthur Moore | | John Chaplin | |
| 1705 | Arthur Moore | | William Cotesworth | |
| 1710 | Arthur Moore | | Robert Vyner | |
| 1713 | Arthur Moore | | William Cotesworth | |
| 1715 | Robert Chaplin | | Joseph Banks | |
| 1721 | Arthur Moore | | Joseph Banks | |
| 1722 | Benjamin Collyer | | Charles Pelham | |
| 1727 | John Page | | George Monson | |
| 1734 | Sir Robert Sutton | | Robert Knight | |
| 1741 | William Lock | | Robert Knight | |
| 1747 | William Lock | | John Gore | |
| 1761 | Hon. Henry Knight | | Joseph Mellish | |
| 1762 | Robert Knight, 1st Baron Luxborough | | Joseph Mellish | |
| 1768 | Colonel Anthony St Leger | | Joseph Mellish | |
| 1774 | Francis Evelyn Anderson | | Joseph Mellish | |
| 1780 | John Harrison | Whig | Francis Eyre | |
| 1784 | John Harrison | Whig | Dudley Long | Whig |
| 1796 | Ayscoghe Boucherett | Whig | William Mellish | Whig |
| 1802 | Ayscoghe Boucherett | Whig | Colonel John Henry Loft | Tory |
| March 1803 | Ayscoghe Boucherett | Whig | William Mellish | Whig |
| July 1803 | Hon. Charles Anderson-Pelham | Whig | William Mellish | Whig |
| 1806 | Hon. Charles Anderson-Pelham | Whig | Hon. George Anderson-Pelham | Whig |
| 1807 | Hon. Charles Anderson-Pelham | Whig | William Ellice | Tory |
| 1808 | Colonel John Henry Loft | Tory | William Ellice | Tory |
| 1812 | John Peter Grant | Whig | Sir Robert Heron, Bt | Whig |
| 1818 | John Nicholas Fazakerley | Whig | Charles Tennyson | Tory |
| 1820 | William Duncombe | Tory | Charles Tennyson | Tory |
| 1826 | Charles Wood | Whig | George Heneage | Whig |
| 1830 | Charles Wood | Whig | George Harris | Tory |
| May 1831 | John Shelley | Tory | George Harris | Tory |
| August 1831 | Henry Fitzroy | Tory | James St Clair-Erskine | Tory |
| 1832 | Representation reduced to one member | | | |

=== MPs 1832–2024 ===
| Election | Member | Party |
|---|---|---|
| 1832 | William Maxfield | Whig |
| 1835 | Edward Heneage | Whig |
| 1852 | William Annesley | Conservative |
| 1857 | Charles Anderson-Pelham | Whig |
| 1859 | Charles Anderson-Pelham | Liberal |
| 1862 by-election | John Chapman | Conservative |
| 1865 | John Fildes | Liberal |
| 1868 | George Tomline | Liberal |
| 1874 | John Chapman | Conservative |
| 1877 by-election | Alfred Watkin | Liberal |
| 1880 | Edward Heneage | Liberal |
| 1886 | Edward Heneage | Liberal Unionist |
| 1892 | Henri Josse | Liberal |
| 1893 by-election | Edward Heneage | Liberal Unionist |
| 1895 | Sir George Doughty | Liberal |
| 1898 by-election | Sir George Doughty | Liberal Unionist |
| Jan 1910 | Thomas Wing | Liberal |
| Dec 1910 | Sir George Doughty | Liberal Unionist |
| 1914 by-election | Thomas Tickler | Conservative |
| 1922 | Tom Sutcliffe | Conservative |
| 1924 | Sir Walter Womersley | Conservative |
| 1945 | Kenneth Younger | Labour |
| 1959 | Tony Crosland | Labour |
| 1977 by-election | Austin Mitchell | Labour |
| 2015 | Melanie Onn | Labour |
| 2019 | Lia Nici | Conservative |
| 2024 | Constituency abolished | |

== Election results 1830–2024 ==
=== Elections in the 1830s ===
General election 1830: Grimsby
| Party | Candidate | Votes | % | ±% |
|---|---|---|---|---|
| Whig | Charles Wood | 227 | 29.0 | |
| Tory | George Harris | 215 | 27.4 | |
| Whig | George Heneage | 186 | 23.7 | |
| Tory | Thomas-Chaloner Bisse-Challoner | 156 | 19.9 | |
| Turnout | | 394 | c. 98.5 | |
| Registered electors | | c. 400 | | |
| Majority | | 12 | 1.6 | |
| Tory hold | | Swing | | |
| Majority | | 29 | 3.7 | N/A |
| Tory gain from Whig | | Swing | | |

General election 1831: Grimsby
| Party | Candidate | Votes | % | ±% |
|---|---|---|---|---|
| Tory | George Harris | 200 | 26.6 | −0.8 |
| Tory | John Shelley | 192 | 25.5 | +5.6 |
| Whig | Rees Howell Gronow | 187 | 24.9 | −4.1 |
| Whig | Henry William Hobhouse | 173 | 23.0 | −0.7 |
| Majority | | 5 | 0.7 | −0.9 |
| Turnout | | c. 376 | c. 94.0 | c. −4.5 |
| Registered electors | | c. 400 | | |
| Tory hold | | Swing | +0.8 | |
| Tory gain from Whig | | Swing | +4.0 | |

By-election, 10 August 1831: Grimsby
| Party | Candidate | Votes | % | ±% |
|---|---|---|---|---|
| Tory | Henry FitzRoy | 182 | 26.9 | +0.3 |
| Tory | James St Clair-Erskine | 181 | 26.8 | +1.3 |
| Whig | Charles Henry Bellenden Ker | 160 | 23.7 | −1.2 |
| Whig | William Maxfield | 153 | 22.6 | −0.4 |
| Majority | | 21 | 3.1 | +2.4 |
| Turnout | | 338 | c. 84.5 | c. −9.5 |
| Registered electors | | c. 400 | | |
| Tory hold | | Swing | +0.6 | |
| Tory hold | | Swing | +1.1 | |

- Caused by the 1831 election being overturned on petition.

General election 1832: Grimsby
| Party | Candidate | Votes | % | ±% |
|---|---|---|---|---|
| Whig | William Maxfield | 297 | 65.3 | +17.4 |
| Tory | James St Clair-Erskine | 158 | 34.7 | −17.4 |
| Majority | | 139 | 30.6 | N/A |
| Turnout | | 455 | 69.4 | c. −24.6 |
| Registered electors | | 656 | | |
| Whig gain from Tory | | Swing | +17.4 | |

General election 1835: Grimsby
| Party | Candidate | Votes | % | ±% |
|---|---|---|---|---|
| Whig | Edward Heneage | 260 | 53.4 | −11.9 |
| Conservative | Alexander Grant | 227 | 46.6 | +11.9 |
| Majority | | 33 | 6.8 | −23.8 |
| Turnout | | 487 | 82.3 | +12.9 |
| Registered electors | | 592 | | |
| Whig hold | | Swing | −11.9 | |

General election 1837: Grimsby
| Party | Candidate | Votes | % | ±% |
|---|---|---|---|---|
| Whig | Edward Heneage | Unopposed | | |
| Registered electors | | 590 | | |
| Whig hold | | | | |

=== Elections in the 1840s ===
General election 1841: Grimsby
| Party | Candidate | Votes | % | ±% |
|---|---|---|---|---|
| Whig | Edward Heneage | Unopposed | | |
| Registered electors | | 573 | | |
| Whig hold | | | | |

General election 1847: Grimsby
| Party | Candidate | Votes | % | ±% |
|---|---|---|---|---|
| Whig | Edward Heneage | Unopposed | | |
| Registered electors | | 619 | | |
| Whig hold | | | | |

=== Elections in the 1850s ===
General election 1852: Grimsby
| Party | Candidate | Votes | % | ±% |
|---|---|---|---|---|
| Conservative | William Annesley | 347 | 54.8 | New |
| Whig | Edward Heneage | 286 | 45.2 | N/A |
| Majority | | 61 | 9.6 | N/A |
| Turnout | | 633 | 73.5 | N/A |
| Registered electors | | 861 | | |
| Conservative gain from Whig | | Swing | N/A | |

General election 1857: Grimsby
| Party | Candidate | Votes | % | ±% |
|---|---|---|---|---|
| Whig | Charles Anderson-Pelham | Unopposed | | |
| Registered electors | | 888 | | |
| Whig gain from Conservative | | | | |

General election 1859: Grimsby
| Party | Candidate | Votes | % | ±% |
|---|---|---|---|---|
| Liberal | Charles Anderson-Pelham | 526 | 91.2 | N/A |
| Chartist | William Colley Parker | 51 | 8.8 | New |
| Majority | | 475 | 82.4 | N/A |
| Turnout | | 577 | 62.7 | N/A |
| Registered electors | | 920 | | |
| Liberal hold | | Swing | N/A | |

=== Elections in the 1860s ===
1862 Grimsby by-election
| Party | Candidate | Votes | % | ±% |
|---|---|---|---|---|
| Conservative | John Chapman | 458 | 50.7 | New |
| Liberal | George Heneage | 446 | 49.3 | −41.9 |
| Majority | | 12 | 1.4 | N/A |
| Turnout | | 904 | 85.1 | +22.4 |
| Registered electors | | 1,062 | | |
| Conservative gain from Liberal | | Swing | N/A | |

- Caused by Anderson-Pelham's succession to the peerage, becoming Earl of Yarborough.

General election 1865: Grimsby
| Party | Candidate | Votes | % | ±% |
|---|---|---|---|---|
| Liberal | John Fildes | 571 | 54.1 | −37.1 |
| Conservative | John Chapman | 485 | 45.9 | N/A |
| Majority | | 86 | 8.2 | −74.2 |
| Turnout | | 1,056 | 83.0 | +20.3 |
| Registered electors | | 1,273 | | |
| Liberal hold | | Swing | N/A | |

General election 1868: Grimsby
| Party | Candidate | Votes | % | ±% |
|---|---|---|---|---|
| Liberal-Conservative | George Tomline | 1,548 | 53.7 | New |
| Liberal | John Fildes | 1,337 | 46.3 | −7.8 |
| Majority | | 211 | 7.4 | N/A |
| Turnout | | 2,885 | 66.4 | −16.6 |
| Registered electors | | 4,348 | | |
| Liberal-Conservative gain from Liberal | | Swing | | |

=== Elections in the 1870s ===
General election 1874: Grimsby
| Party | Candidate | Votes | % | ±% |
|---|---|---|---|---|
| Conservative | John Chapman | 1,534 | 52.4 | N/A |
| Liberal | Edward Heneage | 1,393 | 47.6 | +1.3 |
| Majority | | 141 | 4.8 | N/A |
| Turnout | | 2,927 | 57.5 | −8.9 |
| Registered electors | | 5,091 | | |
| Conservative gain from Liberal-Conservative | | Swing | N/A | |

1877 Great Grimsby by-election
| Party | Candidate | Votes | % | ±% |
|---|---|---|---|---|
| Liberal | Alfred Watkin | 1,699 | 54.6 | +7.0 |
| Conservative | Peter Kerslake Seddon | 1,315 | 42.3 | −10.1 |
| Liberal | Philip Sayle | 97 | 3.1 | N/A |
| Majority | | 384 | 12.3 | N/A |
| Turnout | | 3,111 | 59.4 | +1.9 |
| Registered electors | | 5,235 | | |
| Liberal gain from Conservative | | Swing | +8.6 | |

- Caused by Chapman's death.

=== Elections in the 1880s ===
General election 1880: Grimsby
| Party | Candidate | Votes | % | ±% |
|---|---|---|---|---|
| Liberal | Edward Heneage | 3,054 | 60.4 | +12.8 |
| Conservative | George Morland Hutton | 2,002 | 39.6 | −12.8 |
| Majority | | 1,052 | 20.8 | N/A |
| Turnout | | 5,056 | 77.0 | +19.5 |
| Registered electors | | 6,562 | | |
| Liberal gain from Conservative | | Swing | +12.8 | |

General election 1885: Grimsby
| Party | Candidate | Votes | % | ±% |
|---|---|---|---|---|
| Liberal | Edward Heneage | 3,711 | 56.2 | −4.2 |
| Conservative | Arthur Walker | 2,897 | 43.8 | +4.2 |
| Majority | | 814 | 12.4 | −8.4 |
| Turnout | | 6,608 | 76.3 | −0.7 |
| Registered electors | | 8,659 | | |
| Liberal hold | | Swing | −4.2 | |

1886 Grimsby by-election
| Party | Candidate | Votes | % | ±% |
|---|---|---|---|---|
| Liberal | Edward Heneage | 3,390 | 59.3 | +3.1 |
| Conservative | Arthur Walker | 2,330 | 40.7 | −3.1 |
| Majority | | 1,060 | 18.6 | +6.2 |
| Turnout | | 5,720 | 66.1 | −10.2 |
| Registered electors | | 8,659 | | |
| Liberal hold | | Swing | +3.1 | |

- Caused by Heneage's appointment as Chancellor of the Duchy of Lancaster.

General election 1886: Grimsby
| Party | Candidate | Votes | % | ±% |
|---|---|---|---|---|
| Liberal Unionist | Edward Heneage | 2,982 | 53.0 | +9.2 |
| Liberal | Thomas Sutherst | 2,649 | 47.0 | −9.2 |
| Majority | | 333 | 6.0 | N/A |
| Turnout | | 5,631 | 65.0 | −11.3 |
| Registered electors | | 8,659 | | |
| Liberal Unionist gain from Liberal | | Swing | +9.2 | |

=== Elections in the 1890s ===
General election 1892: Grimsby
| Party | Candidate | Votes | % | ±% |
|---|---|---|---|---|
| Liberal | Henri Josse | 4,202 | 54.1 | +7.1 |
| Liberal Unionist | Edward Heneage | 3,566 | 45.9 | −7.1 |
| Majority | | 636 | 8.2 | N/A |
| Turnout | | 7,768 | 75.3 | +10.3 |
| Registered electors | | 10,315 | | |
| Liberal gain from Liberal Unionist | | Swing | +7.1 | |

Henry Broadhurst

1893 Great Grimsby by-election
| Party | Candidate | Votes | % | ±% |
|---|---|---|---|---|
| Liberal Unionist | Edward Heneage | 4,427 | 56.1 | +10.2 |
| Lib-Lab | Henry Broadhurst | 3,463 | 43.9 | −10.2 |
| Majority | | 964 | 12.2 | N/A |
| Turnout | | 7,890 | 74.0 | −1.3 |
| Registered electors | | 10,662 | | |
| Liberal Unionist gain from Liberal | | Swing | +10.2 | |

- Caused by Josse's resignation.

George Doughty

General election 1895: Grimsby
| Party | Candidate | Votes | % | ±% |
|---|---|---|---|---|
| Liberal | George Doughty | 4,347 | 51.1 | −3.0 |
| Liberal Unionist | Edward Heneage | 4,166 | 48.9 | +3.0 |
| Majority | | 181 | 2.2 | −6.0 |
| Turnout | | 8,513 | 73.7 | −1.6 |
| Registered electors | | 11,558 | | |
| Liberal hold | | Swing | −3.0 | |

Thomas Wintringham

1898 Great Grimsby by-election
| Party | Candidate | Votes | % | ±% |
|---|---|---|---|---|
| Liberal Unionist | George Doughty | 4,940 | 59.3 | +10.4 |
| Liberal | Thomas Wintringham | 3,189 | 38.3 | −12.8 |
| Ind. Conservative | Robert D. Melhuish | 204 | 2.4 | New |
| Majority | | 1,751 | 21.0 | N/A |
| Turnout | | 8,333 | 67.7 | −6.0 |
| Registered electors | | 12,317 | | |
| Liberal Unionist gain from Liberal | | Swing | +11.6 | |

- Doughty resigned to seek re-election as a candidate for the Liberal Unionist Party.

=== Elections in the 1900s ===
General election 1900: Grimsby
| Party | Candidate | Votes | % | ±% |
|---|---|---|---|---|
| Liberal Unionist | George Doughty | Unopposed | | |
| Liberal Unionist hold | | | | |

General election 1906: Grimsby
| Party | Candidate | Votes | % | ±% |
|---|---|---|---|---|
| Liberal Unionist | George Doughty | 6,349 | 50.2 | N/A |
| Liberal | Henry Hyman Haldinstein | 4,040 | 32.0 | New |
| Labour Repr. Cmte. | Thomas Proctor | 2,248 | 17.8 | New |
| Majority | | 2,309 | 18.2 | N/A |
| Turnout | | 12,638 | 78.7 | N/A |
| Registered electors | | 16,058 | | |
| Liberal Unionist hold | | Swing | N/A | |

=== Elections in the 1910s ===
Tom Wing

General election January 1910: Grimsby
| Party | Candidate | Votes | % | ±% |
|---|---|---|---|---|
| Liberal | Thomas Wing | 7,772 | 51.1 | +19.1 |
| Liberal Unionist | George Doughty | 7,450 | 48.9 | −1.3 |
| Majority | | 322 | 2.2 | N/A |
| Turnout | | 15,222 | 84.4 | +5.7 |
| Registered electors | | 18,029 | | |
| Liberal gain from Liberal Unionist | | Swing | +10.2 | |

General election December 1910: Grimsby
| Party | Candidate | Votes | % | ±% |
|---|---|---|---|---|
| Liberal Unionist | George Doughty | 7,903 | 52.3 | +3.4 |
| Liberal | Thomas Wing | 7,205 | 47.7 | −3.4 |
| Majority | | 698 | 4.6 | N/A |
| Turnout | | 15,108 | 83.8 | −0.6 |
| Registered electors | | 18,029 | | |
| Liberal Unionist gain from Liberal | | Swing | +3.4 | |

1914 Great Grimsby by-election
| Party | Candidate | Votes | % | ±% |
|---|---|---|---|---|
| Unionist | Thomas Tickler | 8,471 | 50.8 | −1.5 |
| Liberal | Alfred Bannister | 8,193 | 49.2 | +1.5 |
| Majority | | 278 | 1.6 | −3.0 |
| Turnout | | 16,664 | 80.5 | −3.3 |
| Unionist hold | | Swing | −1.5 | |

General Election 1915: Grimsby (cancelled)
| Party | Candidate | Votes | % | ±% |
|---|---|---|---|---|
| Unionist | Thomas Tickler | | | |
| Liberal | James Whitely Wilkin | | | |
Due to the outbreak of the First World War, this election did not take place. These candidates were chosen by Autumn 1914.

General election 1918: Grimsby
| Party | | Candidate | Votes | % | ±% |
|---|---|---|---|---|---|
| C | Unionist | Thomas Tickler | 13,688 | 51.2 | −1.1 |
| | Labour | Charles Edwin Franklin | 9,015 | 33.7 | New |
| | Ind. Unionist | James William Eason | 2,791 | 10.4 | New |
| | NFDDSS | Harry James Frederick Crosby | 1,260 | 4.7 | New |
| Majority | | | 4,673 | 17.5 | +12.9 |
| Turnout | | | 25,494 | 54.0 | −29.8 |
| | Unionist hold | | Swing | | |
C indicates candidate endorsed by the coalition government.

=== Elections in the 1920s ===
General election 1922: Grimsby
| Party | Candidate | Votes | % | ±% |
|---|---|---|---|---|
| Unionist | Tom Sutcliffe | 23,726 | 62.5 | +11.3 |
| Labour | Charles Edwin Franklin | 14,227 | 37.5 | +1.8 |
| Majority | | 9,499 | 25.0 | +7.5 |
| Turnout | | 37,953 | 72.3 | +18.3 |
| Unionist hold | | Swing | +3.8 | |

General election 1923: Grimsby
| Party | Candidate | Votes | % | ±% |
|---|---|---|---|---|
| Unionist | Tom Sutcliffe | 17,577 | 52.4 | −10.1 |
| Labour | Charles Edwin Franklin | 15,959 | 47.6 | +10.1 |
| Majority | | 1,618 | 4.8 | −20.2 |
| Turnout | | 33,536 | 62.2 | −10.1 |
| Unionist hold | | Swing | −10.1 | |

General election 1924: Grimsby
| Party | Candidate | Votes | % | ±% |
|---|---|---|---|---|
| Unionist | Walter Womersley | 21,487 | 51.4 | −1.0 |
| Labour | Charles Edwin Franklin | 14,874 | 35.6 | −12.0 |
| Liberal | Thomas Wing | 5,442 | 13.0 | New |
| Majority | | 6,613 | 15.8 | +11.0 |
| Turnout | | 41,803 | 76.4 | +14.2 |
| Unionist hold | | Swing | +5.5 | |

General election 1929: Grimsby
| Party | Candidate | Votes | % | ±% |
|---|---|---|---|---|
| Unionist | Walter Womersley | 27,001 | 54.8 | +3.4 |
| Labour | Ernest Marklew | 22,254 | 45.2 | +9.6 |
| Majority | | 4,747 | 9.6 | −6.2 |
| Turnout | | 49,255 | 71.9 | −4.5 |
| Unionist hold | | Swing | −3.1 | |

=== Elections in the 1930s ===
General election 1931: Great Grimsby
| Party | Candidate | Votes | % | ±% |
|---|---|---|---|---|
| Conservative | Walter Womersley | 33,725 | 67.65 | |
| Labour | George Edward Farmery | 16,124 | 32.35 | |
| Majority | | 17,601 | 35.30 | |
| Turnout | | 49,849 | 69.33 | |
| Conservative hold | | Swing | | |

General election 1935: Great Grimsby
| Party | Candidate | Votes | % | ±% |
|---|---|---|---|---|
| Conservative | Walter Womersley | 25,470 | 51.75 | |
| Labour | Henry Brinton | 23,743 | 48.25 | |
| Majority | | 1,727 | 3.50 | |
| Turnout | | 49,213 | 69.27 | |
| Conservative hold | | Swing | | |

=== Elections in the 1940s ===
General election 1945: Great Grimsby
| Party | Candidate | Votes | % | ±% |
|---|---|---|---|---|
| Labour | Kenneth Younger | 28,484 | 60.10 | |
| Conservative | Walter Womersley | 18,841 | 39.81 | |
| Majority | | 9,643 | 20.38 | N/A |
| Turnout | | 47,325 | 68.39 | |
| Labour gain from Conservative | | Swing | | |

=== Elections in the 1950s ===
General election 1950: Great Grimsby
| Party | Candidate | Votes | % | ±% |
|---|---|---|---|---|
| Labour | Kenneth Younger | 28,906 | 56.24 | |
| Conservative | John Hall | 22,494 | 43.76 | |
| Majority | | 6,412 | 12.48 | |
| Turnout | | 51,400 | 82.73 | |
| Labour hold | | Swing | | |

General election 1951: Great Grimsby
| Party | Candidate | Votes | % | ±% |
|---|---|---|---|---|
| Labour | Kenneth Younger | 29,462 | 56.58 | |
| National Liberal | Charles William Hewson | 22,611 | 43.42 | |
| Majority | | 6,851 | 13.16 | |
| Turnout | | 52,073 | 82.01 | |
| Labour hold | | Swing | | |

General election 1955: Great Grimsby
| Party | Candidate | Votes | % | ±% |
|---|---|---|---|---|
| Labour | Kenneth Younger | 24,926 | 53.80 | |
| Conservative | Lord Worsley | 21,404 | 46.20 | |
| Majority | | 3,522 | 7.60 | |
| Turnout | | 46,330 | 73.33 | |
| Labour hold | | Swing | | |

General election 1959: Great Grimsby
| Party | Candidate | Votes | % | ±% |
|---|---|---|---|---|
| Labour | Tony Crosland | 24,729 | 50.10 | |
| Conservative | Wilfrid Pearson | 24,628 | 49.90 | |
| Majority | | 101 | 0.20 | |
| Turnout | | 49,357 | 76.70 | |
| Labour hold | | Swing | | |

=== Elections in the 1960s ===
General election 1964: Great Grimsby
| Party | Candidate | Votes | % | ±% |
|---|---|---|---|---|
| Labour | Tony Crosland | 26,675 | 54.34 | +4.24 |
| Conservative | Wilfrid Pearson | 21,577 | 45.66 | −4.24 |
| Majority | | 4,098 | 8.68 | |
| Turnout | | 48,252 | 75.89 | |
| Labour hold | | Swing | +4.24 | |

General election 1966: Great Grimsby
| Party | Candidate | Votes | % | ±% |
|---|---|---|---|---|
| Labour | Tony Crosland | 26,788 | 58.94 | +4.6 |
| Conservative | Patrick Cormack | 18,662 | 41.06 | −4.6 |
| Majority | | 8,126 | 17.88 | +9.20 |
| Turnout | | 45,450 | 74.18 | |
| Labour hold | | Swing | +4.6 | |

=== Elections in the 1970s ===
General election 1970: Great Grimsby
| Party | Candidate | Votes | % | ±% |
|---|---|---|---|---|
| Labour | Tony Crosland | 23,571 | 52.52 | −6.42 |
| Conservative | Michael Fabian Spungin | 17,460 | 38.90 | −2.16 |
| Liberal | Dilwyn J. Hardwidge | 3,850 | 8.58 | New |
| Majority | | 6,111 | 13.62 | −4.26 |
| Turnout | | 44,881 | 68.38 | |
| Labour hold | | Swing | −2.13 | |

General election February 1974: Great Grimsby
| Party | Candidate | Votes | % | ±% |
|---|---|---|---|---|
| Labour | Tony Crosland | 21,585 | 42.83 | −9.69 |
| Conservative | K. C. Brown | 15,914 | 31.58 | −7.32 |
| Liberal | D. M. Rigby | 12,084 | 23.98 | +15.40 |
| Ind. Conservative | P. H. Kale | 816 | 1.62 | New |
| Majority | | 5,671 | 11.25 | −2.37 |
| Turnout | | 50,399 | 76.73 | |
| Labour hold | | Swing | −1.18 | |

General election October 1974: Great Grimsby
| Party | Candidate | Votes | % | ±% |
|---|---|---|---|---|
| Labour | Tony Crosland | 21,657 | 47.10 | +4.27 |
| Conservative | K. C. Brown | 14,675 | 31.91 | +0.33 |
| Liberal | D. M. Rigby | 9,487 | 20.63 | +3.35 |
| Independent Labour | J. McElrea | 166 | 0.36 | New |
| Majority | | 6,982 | 15.19 | +3.94 |
| Turnout | | 45,985 | 69.36 | |
| Labour hold | | Swing | +2.0 | |

1977 Great Grimsby by-election
| Party | Candidate | Votes | % | ±% |
|---|---|---|---|---|
| Labour | Austin Mitchell | 21,890 | 46.88 | −0.22 |
| Conservative | Robert Blair | 21,370 | 45.76 | +13.85 |
| Liberal | Andrew de Freitas | 3,128 | 6.7 | −13.93 |
| Socialist Workers | Michael Stanton | 215 | 0.5 | New |
| Sunshine Party | Peter Bishop | 64 | 0.1 | New |
| Malcolm Muggeridge Fan Club | Max Nottingham | 30 | 0.0 | New |
| Majority | | 520 | 1.12 | −14.06 |
| Turnout | | 46,697 | | |
| Labour hold | | Swing | −7.03 | |

General election 1979: Great Grimsby
| Party | Candidate | Votes | % | ±% |
|---|---|---|---|---|
| Labour | Austin Mitchell | 26,282 | 52.03 | +4.93 |
| Conservative | Robert Blair | 20,041 | 39.68 | +7.77 |
| Liberal | D. M. Rigby | 3,837 | 7.60 | −13.03 |
| Independent | J. Lennard | 214 | 0.42 | New |
| National Front | J. Hayes | 137 | 0.27 | New |
| Majority | | 6,241 | 12.36 | −2.82 |
| Turnout | | 50,511 | 75.79 | +6.43 |
| Labour hold | | Swing | −1.41 | |

=== Elections in the 1980s ===
General election 1983: Great Grimsby
| Party | Candidate | Votes | % | ±% |
|---|---|---|---|---|
| Labour | Austin Mitchell | 18,330 | 36.3 | −13.7 |
| Conservative | Colin Hancock | 17,599 | 34.9 | −4.8 |
| SDP | Paul Genney | 14,552 | 28.8 | +21.2 |
| Majority | | 731 | 1.4 | −11.0 |
| Turnout | | 50,481 | 73.8 | −2.0 |
| Labour hold | | Swing | −5.4 | |

General election 1987: Great Grimsby
| Party | Candidate | Votes | % | ±% |
|---|---|---|---|---|
| Labour | Austin Mitchell | 23,463 | 50.4 | +14.1 |
| Conservative | Francis Robinson | 14,679 | 31.5 | −3.4 |
| SDP | Paul Genney | 8,387 | 18.0 | −10.8 |
| Majority | | 8,784 | 18.9 | +17.5 |
| Turnout | | 46,529 | 74.7 | +0.9 |
| Labour hold | | Swing | +8.7 | |

=== Elections in the 1990s ===
General election 1992: Great Grimsby
| Party | Candidate | Votes | % | ±% |
|---|---|---|---|---|
| Labour | Austin Mitchell | 25,897 | 51.0 | +0.6 |
| Conservative | Philip Jackson | 18,391 | 36.2 | +4.7 |
| Liberal Democrats | Pat Frankish | 6,475 | 12.8 | −5.2 |
| Majority | | 7,506 | 14.8 | −4.1 |
| Turnout | | 50,763 | 75.3 | +0.6 |
| Labour hold | | Swing | −2.0 | |

General election 1997: Great Grimsby
| Party | Candidate | Votes | % | ±% |
|---|---|---|---|---|
| Labour | Austin Mitchell | 25,765 | 59.8 | +8.8 |
| Conservative | Dean Godson | 9,521 | 22.1 | −14.1 |
| Liberal Democrats | Andrew De Freitas | 7,810 | 18.1 | +5.3 |
| Majority | | 16,244 | 37.7 | +22.9 |
| Turnout | | 43,096 | 66.3 | −9.0 |
| Labour hold | | Swing | +11.5 | |

=== Elections in the 2000s ===
General election 2001: Great Grimsby
| Party | Candidate | Votes | % | ±% |
|---|---|---|---|---|
| Labour | Austin Mitchell | 19,118 | 57.9 | −1.9 |
| Conservative | James Cousins | 7,634 | 23.1 | +1.0 |
| Liberal Democrats | Andrew De Freitas | 6,265 | 19.0 | +0.9 |
| Majority | | 11,484 | 34.8 | −2.9 |
| Turnout | | 33,017 | 52.3 | −14.0 |
| Labour hold | | Swing | −1.4 | |

General election 2005: Great Grimsby
| Party | Candidate | Votes | % | ±% |
|---|---|---|---|---|
| Labour | Austin Mitchell | 15,512 | 47.1 | −10.8 |
| Conservative | Giles Taylor | 7,858 | 23.8 | +0.7 |
| Liberal Democrats | Andrew de Freitas | 6,356 | 19.3 | +0.3 |
| BNP | Stephen Fyfe | 1,338 | 4.1 | New |
| UKIP | Martin Grant | 1,239 | 3.8 | New |
| Green | David Brooks | 661 | 2.0 | New |
| Majority | | 7,654 | 23.3 | −11.5 |
| Turnout | | 32,964 | 51.7 | −0.6 |
| Labour hold | | Swing | −5.7 | |

=== Elections in the 2010s ===
General election 2010: Great Grimsby
| Party | Candidate | Votes | % | ±% |
|---|---|---|---|---|
| Labour | Austin Mitchell | 10,777 | 32.7 | −14.4 |
| Conservative | Victoria Ayling | 10,063 | 30.5 | +6.7 |
| Liberal Democrats | Andrew de Freitas | 7,388 | 22.4 | +3.1 |
| UKIP | Henry Hudson | 2,043 | 6.2 | +2.4 |
| BNP | Stephen Fyfe | 1,517 | 4.6 | +0.5 |
| Independent | Ernie Brown | 835 | 2.5 | New |
| People's National Democratic Party | Adrian Howe | 331 | 1.0 | New |
| Majority | | 714 | 2.2 | −21.1 |
| Turnout | | 32,954 | 53.8 | +2.1 |
| Labour hold | | Swing | −10.5 | |

General election 2015: Great Grimsby
| Party | Candidate | Votes | % | ±% |
|---|---|---|---|---|
| Labour | Melanie Onn | 13,414 | 39.8 | +7.1 |
| Conservative | Marc Jones | 8,874 | 26.3 | −4.2 |
| UKIP | Victoria Ayling | 8,417 | 25.0 | +18.8 |
| Liberal Democrats | Steve Beasant | 1,680 | 5.0 | −17.4 |
| Green | Vicky Dunn | 783 | 2.3 | New |
| Independent | Gary Calder | 390 | 1.2 | New |
| TUSC | Val O'Flynn | 173 | 0.5 | New |
| Majority | | 4,540 | 13.5 | +11.3 |
| Turnout | | 33,731 | 57.7 | +3.9 |
| Labour hold | | Swing | +5.6 | |

General election 2017: Great Grimsby
| Party | Candidate | Votes | % | ±% |
|---|---|---|---|---|
| Labour | Melanie Onn | 17,545 | 49.4 | +9.6 |
| Conservative | Jo Gideon | 14,980 | 42.2 | +15.9 |
| UKIP | Mike Hookem | 1,648 | 4.6 | −20.4 |
| Liberal Democrats | Steve Beasant | 954 | 2.7 | −2.3 |
| Independent | Christina McGilligan-Fell | 394 | 1.1 | New |
| Majority | | 2,565 | 7.2 | −6.3 |
| Turnout | | 35,521 | 58.0 | +0.3 |
| Labour hold | | Swing | −3.1 | |

General election 2019: Great Grimsby
| Party | Candidate | Votes | % | ±% |
|---|---|---|---|---|
| Conservative | Lia Nici | 18,150 | 54.9 | +12.7 |
| Labour | Melanie Onn | 10,819 | 32.7 | −16.7 |
| Brexit Party | Christopher Barker | 2,378 | 7.2 | New |
| Liberal Democrats | Ian Barfield | 1,070 | 3.2 | +0.5 |
| Green | Loyd Emmerson | 514 | 1.6 | New |
| Independent | Nigel Winn | 156 | 0.5 | New |
| Majority | | 7,331 | 22.2 | N/A |
| Turnout | | 33,087 | 57.7 | −0.3 |
| Conservative gain from Labour | | Swing | +14.7 | |

== See also ==
- List of parliamentary constituencies in Humberside

== Sources ==
- Robert Beatson, A Chronological Register of Both Houses of Parliament (London: Longman, Hurst, Res & Orme, 1807) A Chronological Register of Both Houses of the British Parliament, from the Union in 1708, to the Third Parliament of the United Kingdom of Great Britain and Ireland, in 1807
- Cobbett's Parliamentary history of England, from the Norman Conquest in 1066 to the year 1803 (London: Thomas Hansard, 1808) titles A-Z
- F. W. S. Craig, British Parliamentary Election Results 1832-1885 (2nd edition, Aldershot: Parliamentary Research Services, 1989)
- Peter Jupp, British and Irish Elections 1784-1831 (Newton Abbott: David & Charles, 1973)
- T. H. B. Oldfield, The Representative History of Great Britain and Ireland (London: Baldwin, Cradock & Joy, 1816)
- Edward Porritt and Annie G Porritt, The Unreformed House of Commons (Cambridge University Press, 1903)
- J. Holladay Philbin, Parliamentary Representation 1832 - England and Wales (New Haven: Yale University Press, 1965)
- Robert Walcott, English Politics in the Early Eighteenth Century (Oxford: Oxford University Press, 1956)
- Frederic A. Youngs jr, Guide to the Local Administrative Units of England, Vol II (London: Royal Historical Society, 1991)
