= Nicholas Saunderson, 1st Viscount Castleton =

English landowner and politician

Nicholas Saunderson, 1st Viscount Castleton (1562–1631) was an English landowner and politician who sat in the House of Commons in 1593 and 1625.

Saunderson was the eldest son of Robert Saunderson of Saxby and Fillingham and his second wife Catherine Grantham, daughter of Vincent Grantham of St Katherine's, Lincoln. He was educated at Oxford University, being awarded BA in 1579, and also entered Lincoln's Inn in 1579. He succeeded to the estates of Saxby and Fillingham at the age of 21 on the death of his father and became one of the leading landowners of Lincolnshire. By 1569 he was commissioner for sewers for Lincolnshire. He was J.P. for Lindsey Lincolnshire from 1591 and JP for Nottinghamshire from about 1592. He was High Sheriff of Lincolnshire from 1592 to 1593.

In 1593, Saunderson was elected Member of Parliament for Great Grimsby, a seat which his uncle Thomas Grantham had held until his death. He was knighted in 1603 and purchased a baronetcy in 1611. He was High Sheriff of Lincolnshire again from 1613 to 1614. In 1624 he was commissioner for recusancy. He was elected MP for Lincolnshire in 1625. In 1627 he obtained a peerage as Viscount Castleton. He was considered one of the leading "depopulators by enclosure" in Lincolnshire. He lived in style and employed the musician Giles Farnaby to teach his children.

Saunderson died at the age of about 70.

Saunderson married firstly a daughter of William Rokeby before 1593 and secondly Mildred Hiltofte, daughter of John Hiltofte of Boston before 1599. He had four sons and two daughters, two of whom married into the Bertie and Rutland families. His brother Robert Saunderson was also an MP.

Parliament of England
Preceded by Thomas Moryson; Tristram Tyrwhitt	Member of Parliament for Great Grimsby; 1593; With: William Barne	Succeeded by Thomas Hatcliffe; Thomas Ellis
Preceded by Montagu Bertie; Sir Thomas Grantham	Member of Parliament for Lincolnshire; 1625; With: Sir John Wray, 2nd Baronet	Succeeded by John Monson; Sir William Airmine
Baronetage of England
New creation	Baronet (of Saxby); 1611–1630	Succeeded by Nicholas Saunderson
Peerage of Ireland
New creation	Viscount Castleton; 1627–1630	Succeeded by Nicholas Saunderson
