= William Hosier =

Member of the Parliament of England

William Hosier was the member of Parliament for Great Grimsby in 1404. He and his sons twice attempted to murder the Grimsby burgess William Welle, but succeeded only in wounding him.
