= William Paull =

William Paull may refer to:

- William Paull (baritone) (c. 1872–1903), British baritone
- William Paull (politician) (1846–1926), member of the Queensland Legislative Assembly
- William of Pagula (died 1332), also known as William Paull, English canon lawyer and theologian

== See also ==
- William Paule (fl. 1388), English politician
