= Thomas Moryson =

Member of the Parliament of England

Thomas Moryson or Morrison (died 19 February 1592), of Cadeby, Lincolnshire, was a 16th-century English politician who sat as MP for Grimsby from 1572 until 1589.

The son of George Moryson, of Waltham, Lincolnshire, in 1555, he became Commissioner for Sewers of Cambridgeshire, Huntingdonshire, the Isle of Ely, Lincolnshire, Northamptonshire and Nottinghamshire. He was granted a Crown lease or 21 years of lands near Grimsby in 1559 and in 1561 acquired the manor of Beesby, Lincolnshire. Appointed a justice of the peace for Lindsey in 1564, by 1569, he was Deputy Clerk to Christopher Smith at the Exchequer.

Elected member of parliament for Grimsby in 1572, he became Mayor of Great Grimsby in 1576, and Clerk of the Pipe by January 1579. Lord Burghley nominated him as a Bencher of Gray's Inn on 28 February 1584 and he was returned to Parliament representing Grimsby until 1589.

He married in 1559 Elizabeth, daughter of Thomas Moigne, of Willingham, Lindsey, Lincolnshire. They had two daughters and five sons of whom Richard Moryson was a soldier and MP, and Fynes Moryson was a writer and historian.

== See also ==
- Morrison baronets

Parliament of England
| Preceded by Thomas St Poll; John Thymbleby | Member of Parliament for Grimsby; 1572 – 1589; With: Thomas Grantham 1572; William Wray 1584; Tristram Tyrwhitt 1586–1589 | Succeeded by William Barne; Nicholas Saunderson |
