= Frescheville =

Frescheville may refer to:

- John Frescheville
- Frescheville Holles
