= Edward Heneage =

Edward Heneage may refer to:

- Edward Heneage (1802–1880), MP for Grimsby
- Edward Heneage, 1st Baron Heneage (1840–1922), British politician, MP for Grimsby and Lincoln, nephew of the above
- Edward Heneage (cricketer) (1775–1810), English cricketer
