= Elmsall =

Elmsall may refer to:

== Places ==
- North Elmsall, a village and civil parish in West Yorkshire, England
- South Elmsall, a small town and civil parish in West Yorkshire, England
  - Moorhouse and South Elmsall Halt railway station (former)
  - South Elmsall bus station
  - South Elmsall railway station

== People ==
- William Elmsall (fl. 1386-1399), English politician
