= Simon Patrick (translator) =

English translator

Simon Patrick (died 1613) was an English gentleman of Lincolnshire, known as a translator.

== Life ==
He matriculated as a pensioner at Peterhouse, Cambridge, on 21 May 1561, and was a member at Elizabeth I's visitation in August 1564. He was admitted to Lincoln's Inn in 1567, and travelled abroad. His estate was at Caistor, Lincolnshire.

== Works ==
Patrick published:

- The Estate of the Church, with the discourse of times, from the Apostles untill this present: Also of the lives of all the Emperours, Popes of Rome, and Turkes: As also of the kings of France, England, Scotland, Spaine, Portugall, Denmarke, &c. With all the memorable accidents of their times. Translated out of French, London, 1602. The dedication is to Sir William Wray, 1st Baronet, of Glentworth. The book is a composite work of translation, based on French sources, the 1581 edition of L'état de l'église by Jean de Hainault, and its preface by Jean Crespin. It drew on the works of Girolamo Conestaggio, David Chytraeus, and Gilbert Génébrard. In addition Patrick used English authors (Richard Hakluyt, John Hooker and John Stow), and possibly his own research. The work contains a version of the story of the pact between Pope Alexander VI and the Devil.
- A discourse upon the meanes of wel governing and maintaining in good peace, a kingdome, or other principalitie. Divided into three parts, namely, The Counsell, the Religion, and the Policie, which a Prince ought to hold and follow. Against Nicholas Machiavell the Florentine. Translated into English by Simon Patericke, London, 1602 and 1608. This work is dedicated, August 1577, to "the most famous yong gentlemen, Francis Hastings and Edward Bacon." It is a translation of Innocent Gentillet's Discours sur les moyens de bien gouverner, originally published in Latin in 1571, and translated into French in 1576. The printers were Felix Kingston and Adam Islip in the respective editions. It may have circulated in manuscript, and influenced the French History of Anne Dowriche, before its publication.

== Family ==
In 1587, Patrick lost his first wife, Mary, and in 1601 his second wife, Dorothea; his third survived him. He was the father of fifteen children, of whom Henry was the father of Simon Patrick the bishop and of John Patrick. His will, in the prerogative court of Canterbury, is dated 12 September 1613.
