= John Newland (disambiguation) =

John Newland (1917–2000) was an American film director, actor, television producer, and screenwriter.

John Newland may also refer to:

- John Newland (fl. 1384–1386), MP for Great Grimsby
- John Newlands (Australian politician) (1864–1932), also known as John Newland, Scottish-born Australian politician

== See also ==
- John Newlands (disambiguation)
