= Simon Elkyngton =

Member of the Parliament of England

Simon Elkyngton was the member of Parliament for Great Grimsby in 1421 and 1422. He was mayor of the town in 1429–30 and 1440–41.
