= Treasurer of the Chamber =

Influence of the Treasure of the Chamber

The Treasurer of the Chamber was at various points a position in the British royal household.

== 13th century ==
The post of Treasurer of the Chamber first arose in the early 13th century. As part of the evolutionary changes that saw the Treasurer of the Exchequer become an office of state outside the King's Household, one of the Chamber Clerks took on responsibility for financial matters within the Household. The Treasurer of the Chamber had oversight of the Clerks (keepers) of the Wardrobe, among other duties; but in 1232 the office was merged into that of Keeper of the Wardrobe, being one of a number of offices held by Peter Des Rivaux; his successors were known interchangeably as Keepers or Treasurers of the Wardrobe, and the post survives today in the sinecure of Treasurer of the Household.

== 14th century ==
In the reign of Edward II the influence of the Wardrobe diminished, and the Chamber regained its place of seniority within the Household. In order to enable the Chamber to serve as a source of funds for the monarch, income from certain lands confiscated by the Crown (namely those of Walter Langton and of the Knights Templar) were directed into the Chamber, one of whose Clerks took responsibility for their receipt. A generation later, under Edward III, this official had the title Receiver of the Chamber, but was also referred to as the Treasurer of the Chamber. The Receiver tended to function as the executive head of the Chamber at this time, working under the titular head, the King's Chamberlain. In the 1330s–50s three Receivers held concurrently the offices of Keeper of the Mint and Keeper of the Privy Wardrobe, both at the Tower of London. The Privy Wardrobe was linked to the Chamber as a safe repository of jewels, plate and other treasures, as well as of arms, armour and artillery pieces.

In the 1350s moves were made which saw the Chamber lands and their incomes transferred to the Exchequer. Subsequently, the role of the Receiver diminished. The post then went into abeyance for a time; when it was revived, its main focus was on custody of certain jewels and gold and silver vessels. In the last decade of the century, under Richard II, the office was again united with that of Keeper of the Privy Wardrobe in the person of John Lowick.

== 15th–18th centuries ==
With the Privy Wardrobe specialising in armaments, a dedicated Jewel Office was set up in the early 15th century. The Black Book of Edward IV of England lists its chief officer as 'Keeper of the King's Jewels and Treasurer of the Chamber'.

In 1485 the office of Treasurer of the Chamber was separated from that of the Master of the Jewel Office, situated within the Privy Chamber department of the Lord Steward. It became an important office of finance established by Henry VII (1485–1509) to administer his new secretive and highly efficient system identified and named "Chamber Finance" by 20th-century historians, which sought to mirror the operation of the Exchequer, which was inefficient and subject to parliamentary overview. The office was abolished in 1782.

== List of treasurers of the chamber ==
=== Treasurer of the Chamber ===
- Luke the Chaplain (1225–1228) – later Archdeacon of Norwich and Archbishop of Dublin
- Ranulf the Breton (1228–1231)
- Peter of Rivaux (1231–1234)

From 1232, this office was united with that of Keeper of the Wardrobe.

=== Receiver (or Treasurer) of the Chamber ===
- Ingelard Warley (before 1309) – also Keeper of the Wardrobe
- Roger Wingfield (?1309–1314)
- Richard Squire (1314–1317)
- Robert Appleby (1314–1315)
- John Peacock (1314–1319)
- Richard Lusteshull (1315–1321)
- James of Spain (?1321–1322)
- William Langley (1322–1326)
- Thomas Gargrave (1330)
- Richard de Bury (1331) – later Bishop of Durham
- John Fleet (1333–1334) – also Keeper of the Privy Wardrobe
- William Trussell (1333–1335) – son of Sir William Trussell
- William Kilsby (1335–1338)
- Thomas Hatfield (1338–1344) – afterwards Bishop of Durham
- Robert Burton (1344–1349)
- Robert Mildenhall (1346–1353) – also Keeper of the Privy Wardrobe
- Thomas Bramber (1347–1349)
- Richard Norwich (1349–1355)
- William Rothwell (1353–1355) – also Keeper of the Privy Wardrobe
- William of Wykeham (?1355–1361) – later Bishop of Winchester
- Helming Leget (1362–1375) – Constable of Windsor Castle
- William Gambon (1375–1376)
- Philip de la Vache (1377–1378)
- Vacant – Acting Receiver: Simon de Burley
- Baldwin Raddington (1380–1382)
- John Salesbury (1382)
- Richard Abberbury (1382)
- John Bacon (1382–1384)
- John Beauchamp (1384–1387)
- John Golafre (1387)
- Lambert Fermer (1387–1391)
- Guy Mone (1391–1398) – Bishop of St Davids
- John Lowick (1398–1399) – also Keeper of the Privy Wardrobe

=== Keeper of the King's Jewels and Treasurer of the Chamber ===
- William Pilton 1405–1407 (Archdeacon of York)
- Sir John Merston 1445–1448
- Richard Merston 1453–1456
- William Grimsby 1456–1461
- William Porte 1461–1465
- Thomas Vaughan 1465–1483
- Edmund Chaderton 1484–1485

=== Treasurer of the Chamber ===
- Sir Thomas Lovell 1485–1492
- Sir John Heron 1492–1521
- John Myclo 1521–1522
- Henry Wyatt 1524–1528
- Brian Tuke 1528–1545
- Sir Anthony Rous 1545–1546
- Sir William Cavendish 1546–?1558
- John Mason 1558–1566
- Sir Francis Knollys 1567–1570
- Sir Thomas Heneage 1570–1595
- John Stanhope, 1st Baron Stanhope 1596–1616
- Sir William Uvedale 1618–1642
- Interregnum 1649–1660
- Sir Edward Griffin 1660–1679
- Edward Griffin 1679–1689
- Sir Rowland Gwynne 1689–1692
- vacant
- Lord Edward Russell 1694–1702
- John Berkeley, 4th Viscount Fitzhardinge 1702–1712
- John West, 6th Baron De La Warr 1713–1714
- Charles Robartes, 2nd Earl of Radnor 1714–1720
- Henry Pelham 1720–1722
- Charles Stanhope 1722–1727
- John Hobart, 1st Baron Hobart 1727–1744
- Sir John Hynde Cotton, 3rd Baronet 1744–1746
- Richard Arundell 1746–1755
- Wills Hill, 1st Earl of Hillsborough 1755–1756
- Charles Townshend 1756–1761
- Sir Francis Dashwood, Bt 1761–1762
- Sir Gilbert Elliot, 3rd Baronet 1762–1770
- George Rice 1770–1779
- Lord Charles Spencer 1779–1782

== See also ==
- History of the English fiscal system

== Sources ==
- Treasurers of the Chamber 1660–1782
- Newton, Arthur Percival (July 1917). "The King's Chamber under the Early Tudors". The English Historical Review. 32 (127): 348–372. doi:10.1093/ehr/XXXII.CXXVII.348. JSTOR 551043.
- Richardson, W.C., Tudor Chamber Administration 1485–1547, Baton Rouge Louisiana, 1952.
