= William Grimsby =

Member of the Parliament of England

William Grimsby or Grymesby (1420–1482) was an English courtier and parliamentarian, a member of the Lancastrian faction in the Wars of the Roses.

Grimsby was returned as Member of the Parliament of England for Great Grimsby in the Parliament of February 1449, and later was appointed to a series of court offices under Henry VI – Yeoman of the Crown (1454–57), Treasurer of the Chamber (1456-60), and Squire of the Body (1457–61). He was returned to Parliament for Lincolnshire in 1459 (the Parliament of Devils), and was awarded some of the lands it confiscated from Yorkist nobles.

Grimsby may have fought at the Battle of Northampton in July 1460, and certainly fought at the Battle of Wakefield in December, a Lancastrian victory, and at the Battle of Towton the following March, a catastrophic defeat. He was attainted by the Yorkists, his lands were confiscated and awarded to John Ferriby, and Grimsby fled into obscurity. He was reported to have died in the Marshalsea of "black jaundice" in 1462, and his wife was allowed to take over her own inherited estates in August 1464.

However, he was still alive; in 1462, he was with the exiled Margaret of Anjou in France. He had returned to England by the Readeption of Henry VI in 1470, and may have been returned to the 1470-71 Readeption Parliament. Following the Battle of Tewkesbury in May 1471, he was again reported dead, executed along with other Lancastrian prisoners, but again this was a false report, and he survived to be pardoned in December 1471. He was returned to Parliament a third or fourth time, for Grimsby, in the Parliament of 1472-75, where he successfully arranged for his attainder to be annulled. He rose again under the new regime, being made a justice of the peace in 1475 and securing sinecure posts overseeing the Port of London in 1477 and 1478.
