= Richard Duffield =

English politician

Richard Duffield (fl. 1413–1435), of Barton-upon-Humber, Lincolnshire, was an English politician.

He was a Member (MP) of the Parliament of England for Great Grimsby in May 1413, November 1414, 1420, December 1421, 1422, 1423, 1425, 1426, 1431, 1432, 1433 and 1435.
