= Clerk of the Pipe =

Former English civil servant post

The Clerk of the Pipe was a post in the Pipe Office of the English Exchequer and its successors. The incumbent was responsible for the pipe rolls on which the government income and expenditure was recorded as credits and debits.

The Dialogus de Scaccario or Dialogue concerning the Exchequer, written in about 1178, details the workings of the Exchequer and gives an early account of how the Pipe rolls were created. The Dialogue was written by Richard FitzNeal, the son of Nigel of Ely, who was Treasurer for both Henry I and Henry II of England. According to the Dialogue, the Pipe rolls were the responsibility of the clerk of the Treasurer, who was also called the ingrosser of the great roll and, by 1547 at the latest, the Clerk of the Pipe.

The Pipe Office was abolished in 1834.

A similar post existed in Ireland and Scotland.

== Clerks of the Pipe ==
- 1400s: Sir Nicholas Dixon
- 1431–: Robert Cawood
- Robert Malton
- 1486–: Nicholas Lathell
- 15nn–: Thomas Cavendish (died 1524)
- 1520s–1545: John Hyde
- 1551–?1589: Christopher Smith
- 1579–: John Morley (died 1587)
- 1579–?1592: Thomas Moryson (died 1592)
- 1592–1594: Sir John Wolley (died 1596)
- 1596–1605: Sir Edward Stafford
- 1607–?1609: Francis Wolley (died 1609)
- 1609–1610: Arthur Jarvis
- 1610–1616: Sir Arthur Mainwaring
- 1616–1632: Henry Croke (jointly)
- 1616–1632: Anthony Rous (jointly) (died 1632)
- 1632–1659: Henry Croke
- 1659–1680: Robert Croke (died 1680)
- 1689–1703: Robert Russell
- 1703–1706: William Cheyne, 2nd Viscount Newhaven
- 1706–1710: Sir John Cooke
- 1710–1711: William Farrer
- 1711–1728: William Cheyne, 2nd Viscount Newhaven
- 1728–1728: Anthony Cornish
- 1728–1748: Henry Holt Henley
- 1748–1748: Sir William Corbet, 5th Baronet
- 1748–1758: Richard Arundell
- 1758–1783: Sir John Shelley, 5th Baronet
- 1783–?1834 Lord William Bentinck
- 1834 Post abolished
