= Fynes Moryson =

British explorer and author

- Born: 1566; Lincolnshire, England
- Died: 12 February 1630 (aged 63–64); London, England
- Other name: Fynes Morison
- Known for: Travel writing and social observation

Fynes Moryson (or Morison; 1566 – 12 February 1630) was an English writer and secretary. He spent most of the 1590s travelling on the European continent and in the eastern Mediterranean lands. He wrote about them later in his multi-volume Itinerary, a work of value to historians as a picture of the social conditions existing in the lands he visited.

== Biography ==
Moryson was the son of Thomas Moryson, a Lincolnshire gentleman who had been member of Parliament for Grimsby in Lincolnshire. Fynes Moryson was educated at Peterhouse, Cambridge, and after graduating he gained a fellowship for further study there.

From May 1591 to May 1595 Moryson travelled around continental Europe for the specific purpose of observing local customs, institutions and economics. He took written notes. From early 1596 to mid-1597 he journeyed to Jerusalem, Tripoli, Antioch, Aleppo, Constantinople and Crete for the same purpose.

In 1600 Moryson was appointed personal secretary to Lord Mountjoy, who was the head of government and commander-in-chief of the army in Ireland, then fighting against Tyrone's Rebellion. One of Moryson's brothers, Sir Richard Moryson, also held an upper-level government appointment in Ireland. After the rebellion ended in 1603 Moryson and Mountjoy both returned to England. Moryson remained Mountjoy's secretary until Mountjoy's death in 1606. Later Moryson wrote a book about the military and government affairs of Ireland during the years when he was there with Mountjoy.

In 1617 Moryson published the first three volumes of An Itinerary: Containing His Ten Years Travel Through the Twelve Dominions of Germany, Bohemia, Switzerland, Netherland, Denmark, Poland, Italy, Turkey, France, England, Scotland and Ireland. The Itinerary was originally intended to consist of four or five volumes. Only three volumes were published in his lifetime, breaking off in the middle of an exposé. Moryson had to translate his texts from Latin to find a larger readership. A fourth volume, continuing the previous argument but written in English from the outset, was licensed for the press in 1626. Apparently it was never printed. It is preserved in manuscript in the library of Corpus Christi College, Oxford. Another part of the Itinerary was republished in 1735 with the title History of Ireland 1599–1603, with a short Narrative of the State of the Kingdom from 1169. In 1903, Sherratt & Hughes published the bulk of the fourth volume, which was transcribed by Charles Hughes and published under the title "Shakespeare's Europe: Unpublished Chapters of Fynes Moryson's Itinerary. Being a survey of the condition of Europe at the end of the 16th century." The volumes I, III and IV of Moryson's Itinerary primarily cover continental Europe and secondarily the Ottoman lands, with volume I being travel narratives from 1591 to 1598 and volumes III and IV forming a thematic "Discourse of Travelling" covering themes of geography, customs, fashion, religion and political institutions. The latter also has extensive material on customs and institutions in Ireland and more concise articles on England and Scotland and Ireland, which needed, according to the author, to be elaborated. Volume II, on the other hand, is devoted to rebellious movements in Ireland from 1599 to 1603.

Sometimes Moryson is a prejudiced and unreliable informant. According to his biographer Charles Hughes, "he had a sane charity for all men, except Turks and Irish priests", His antipathy to Irish priests can be illustrated by a satirical verse in his Itinerary in which "four vile beasts" are said to afflict the Irish: lice, rats, priests, and wolves.

It is believed that this volume contains the earliest example of "Merry Christmas" in print:

...so suddenly as his wife and eldest son were taken, and himself hardly escaped at a backe window, and naked, into the woods, where he kept a cold Christmas, while my Lord hued plentifully in his house, with such provisions as were made, for him and his Bonnaghs and kerne to keepe a merry Christmas.

Moryson died unmarried in London on 12 February 1630.

== Online texts ==
The first three volumes of Moryson's Itinerary were republished in 1907 and broken up into four physical parts. These are downloadable at the Internet Archive:

- Itinerary, Volumes I, II and III: 1, 2, 3 and 4

The conceptual fourth volume of Moryson's Itinerary, as published by Charles Hughes in 1903, is available from Archive.org. This volume is prefaced with a 45-page biography of Fynes Moryson written by Charles Hughes.

- Itinerary Volume IV

A revised edition of the original manuscript, including the passages deleted by Hughes, was part of a 1995 Birmingham thesis.

- Kew, Graham David (ed.), Shakespeare's Europe Revisited. The Unpublished Diary of Fynes Moryson (1566–1630), thesis Birmingham 1995, 4 vols.: 1 (with an extensive introduction), 2, 3, and 4.

== Concordance ==
	Book	Fynes Moryson – Itinerary (A)	Years	ed. 1617	ed. 1907/08	
Part I	1; 2; 3.1	Journeys	1591–98	I, 1	I, 1	
	3.2–3.5			I, 217	II, 1	
	3.6	Money exchange	1605–17	I, 275	II, 122	
Part II	1; 2.1	The Rebellion in Ireland	1599–1602	II, 1	II, 165	
	2.2			II, 141	III,1	
Part III	1	The Discourse of Travelling	1605–17	III, 2	III, 349	
	2.1	Means to Travel		III, 54	III, 464	
	2.2	On Buildings		III, 63	III, 483	
	2.3–4	Geography		III, 75	IV, 1	
	4.1; 4.2	Apparel		III, 165	IV, 204	
	4.3	Commonwealth		III, 181	IV, 238	
		Fynes Moryson – Itinerary (B)	1617–26	Manuscr.	ed. 1903	ed. 1995
Part IV	1; 2.1	(continued)		fol.1	1	II, 1–615
	2.2			fol.231	174	II, 616–796
	3	Religion		fol.300	261	III, 796–1199
	4	Nature and Manners		fol.460	290	IV, 1200–1741

Political offices
Preceded by George Cranmer	Chief Secretary for Ireland; 1600–1603	Succeeded by John Bingley
