= 1877 Great Grimsby by-election =

UK Parliamentary by-election

The 1877 Great Grimsby by-election was fought on 1 August 1877. The by-election was fought due to the death of the incumbent Conservative MP, John Chapman. It was won by the Liberal candidate Alfred Watkin.
