= John Newlands =

John Newlands may refer to:

- John Newlands (chemist) (1837–1898), English analytical chemist
- John Newlands (Australian politician) (1864–1932), Australian Senator
- John Newlands (Canadian politician) (1889–19??), politician in Ontario, Canada

== See also ==
- John Newland (disambiguation)
