= John Chapman (Grimsby MP) =

British Conservative Party politician

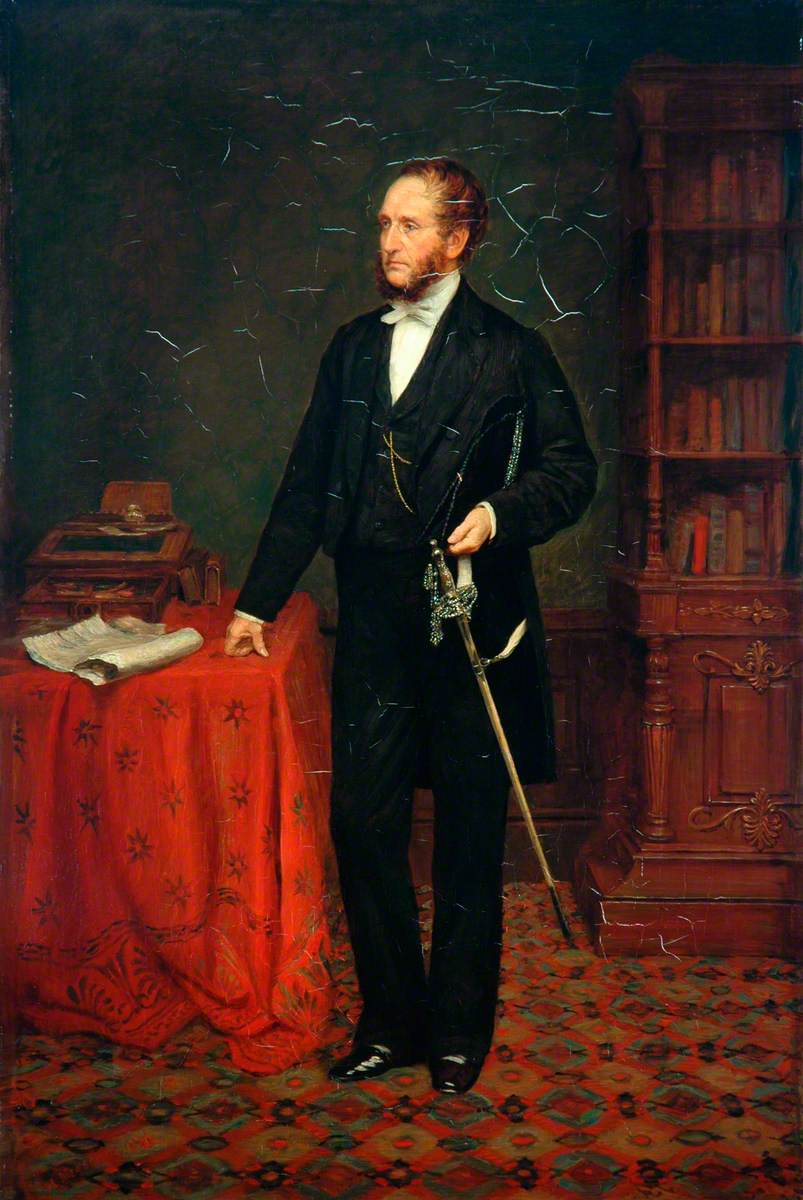
1870 portrait by H. Measham

John Chapman JP DL (1810 – 18 July 1877) was a British Conservative Party politician who served for two three-year terms as the Member of Parliament (MP) for Great Grimsby.

Having unsuccessfully contested the 1859 general election in Salisbury, he was elected at a by-election in February 1862 as the MP for Great Grimsby. His majority was only 12 votes out of 1004, and an election petition was lodged against his victory, but dismissed; however he was defeated at the 1865 general election, when he also stood unsuccessfully in Salisbury. He did not contest either seat in 1868, but at the 1874 general election he stood only in Great Grimsby, where he regained the seat. However, he died in office three years later, aged 67.

He was a Deputy Lieutenant of Cheshire and served as High Sheriff of Cheshire in 1855, and was chairman and later director of the Manchester, Sheffield and Lincolnshire Railway, and a director of the Bridgwater Navigation Company. Chapman died at his house at Hill End in Mottram where he was also lord of the manor of Hattersley and as such supported the residents of the area including presenting them with a free library. Chapman had been a magistrate in Cheshire, Derbyshire, Lancashire and the West Riding of Yorkshire.

== See also ==
- Edward Chapman (politician and son of John Chapman)

Parliament of the United Kingdom
Preceded by Lord Worsley	Member of Parliament for Great Grimsby; 1862–1865	Succeeded by John Fildes
Preceded by George Tomline	Member of Parliament for Great Grimsby; 1874–1877	Succeeded by Alfred Watkin
