= George Tomline (politician) =

English politician

George Tomline (3 March 1813 – 25 August 1889), referred to as Colonel Tomline, was an English politician who served as Member of Parliament (MP) for various constituencies. He was the son of William Edward Tomline and grandson of George Pretyman Tomline.

== Life ==
Tomline was baptised on 1 June 1813 at St. Margaret's, Westminster by his grandfather the Bishop of Lincoln.

He was educated at Eton College, following which he made a Grand Tour in Europe mostly travelling in a gig.

He succeeded to his father's estates, at Riby Grove, Lincolnshire, and Orwell Park, Suffolk, in 1836, and he also inherited through his mother, Frances (nee Amler or Ambler), Ford Hall near Shrewsbury, Shropshire. He was Colonel of the Royal North Lincolnshire Militia.

He was Member of Parliament for:

- Sudbury (1840–1841 - as Conservative);
- Shrewsbury (1841–1847 - as Conservative, alongside Benjamin Disraeli) and (1852–1868 - as Liberal);
- Great Grimsby (1868–1874, as Liberal).

In parliament he was well known as an advocate of bi-metallism in currency and for posting silver bars to successive Chancellors of the Exchequer, demanding the Royal Mint had a duty to convert them into coinage. While ‘out of office’ between 1847 and 1852 Tomline purchased the Orwell Park estate.

During the 1880 General Election he unsuccessfully contested the Harwich seat. Following the election he raised the Harwich Election Petition (1880) against his opponent. At the conclusion of the trial Colonel Tomline was found guilty of bribery.

In 1881 he unsuccessfully contested a by-election in North Lincolnshire as a Liberal.

He was High Sheriff of Lincolnshire for 1852.

He was a keen amateur astronomer who built an observatory at Orwell Park. He was founder and chairman of the Felixstowe Railway and Pier Company which built the Felixstowe Branch Line and established the Port of Felixstowe. Tomline Road in Ipswich which runs parallel to the railway line is named after him.

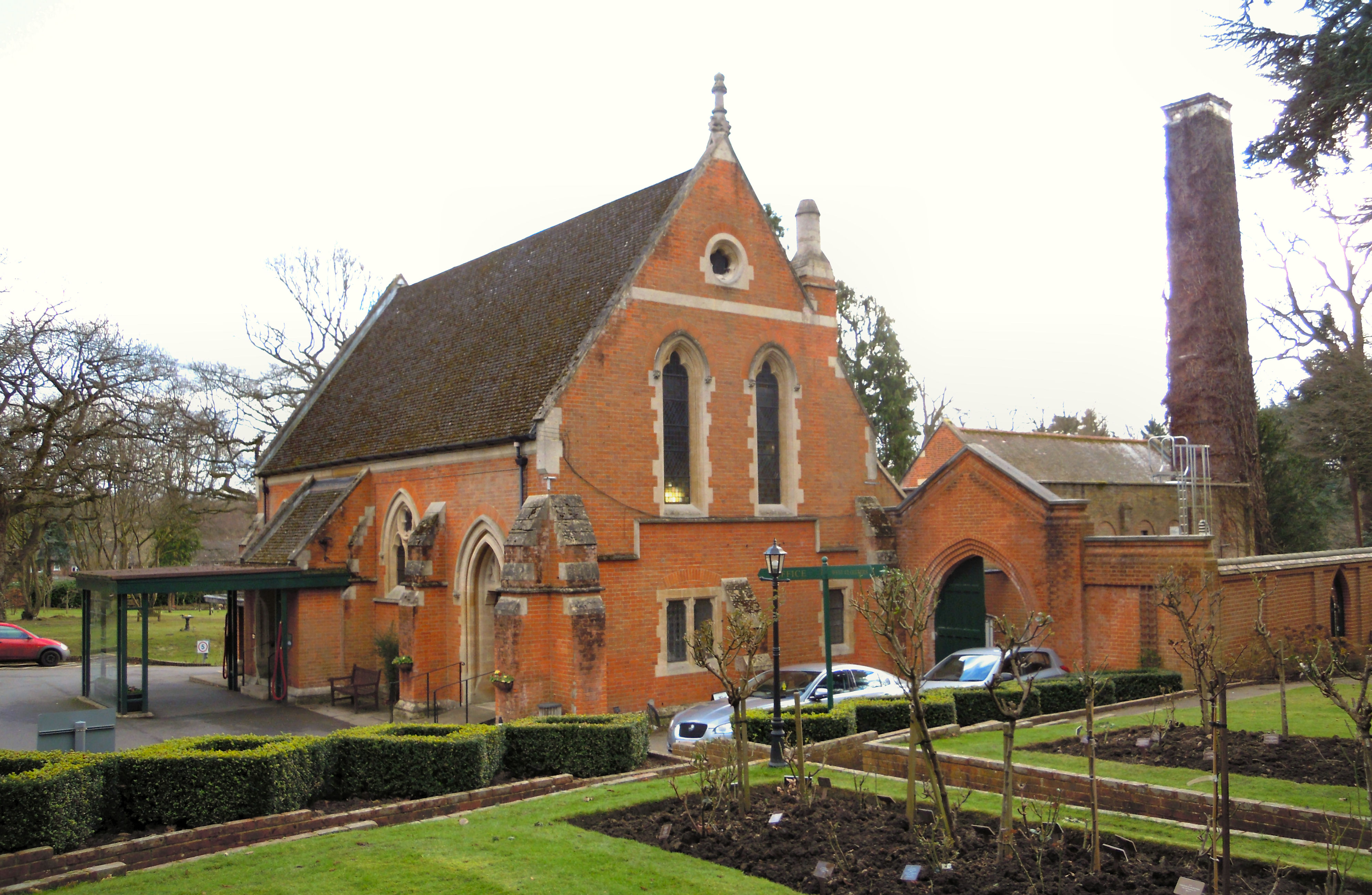
Woking Crematorium in 2018

He died, unmarried, from a stroke after a long illness at his London home, Number 1 Carlton House Terrace on 25 August 1889, aged 76. After a funeral service at St Martin's in the Fields on 29 August, his body was cremated at Woking Crematorium and his ashes sent to London.

His heir, to whom his estates devolved, was the Rt Hon. Captain Ernest George Pretyman MP, at various times Parliamentary Under-Secretary to the Board of Trade, and Civil Lord of the Admiralty.

== Tomline Prize ==
In 1836, Eton College appointed its first Mathematical Master, Mr Stephen Hawtrey, and Tomline promoted the study of this subject by donating money for the mathematics prize: the first recipient was Matthew Piers Watt Boulton in 1837. The long-standing informal arrangement was formalized in 1854 by a deed in which a sum somewhat in excess of £1000 was granted for the purposes of a scholarship. The prize was open to the whole school and the winner (known as the Tomline Prizeman) received £30 worth of books.

Several winners of the Tomline Prize were notable in a mathematical field, including Norman Macleod Ferrers (1846), Philip Herbert Cowell (1886), G.H.J. Hurst (1887 - 2nd Wrangler and Fellow of King's), John Maynard Keynes (1901), J. B. S. Haldane (1909), T.H.R. Skyrme (1939), Peter Swinnerton-Dyer (1943), Robin Milner (1952), Luke Hodgkin (1956 - Mathematics, King's College London), John Pryce (1957 - Emeritus Professor of Mathematics, Cardiff) and Warren Li (2016 - Senior Wrangler in 2019). The prize has been awarded annually as the principal mathematics prize at Eton since 1837 (with a hiatus between 1977 and 1987); since 2010, candidates for the prize must write an extended mathematical essay and are called on to defend it viva voce.

== Bibliography ==
- Allen, David, 'Victorian Suffolk's Great Eccentric: Colonel George Tomline 1813-1889', Proceedings of the Suffolk Institute of Archaeology and History 41, Part 1 (2005), 79–102.
- Bence-Jones, G. (1995). Orwell Park. Electric Ink Ltd.
- Burke, Sir Bernard (1863). A Genealogical and Heraldic Dictionary of the Landed Gentry of Great Britain and Ireland. London: Harrison. pp. p.1518. "william edward tomline."
- Gooding, R. (2003). "George Tomline & Relatives". Orwell Astronomical Society. Archived from the original on 2 August 2005.
- Goward, K. J. (2006). "Founding of Orwell Park Observatory". Orwell Astronomical Society. Archived from the original on 30 June 2007.
- Gowing, R. Shave (1875) "George Tomline", in Public Men of Ipswich and East Suffolk Ipswich:Scopes and London:Grant & Co, 103–109.

=== Obituaries ===
- Eddowes's Shrewsbury Journal, 28 August 1889
- Lincolnshire Chronicle, 30 August 1889
- Ipswich Journal, 30 August 1889
- Shrewsbury Chronicle, 30 August 1889

Parliament of the United Kingdom
Preceded by Joseph Bailey; Sir John Walsh	Member of Parliament for Sudbury; 1840–1841; With: Joseph Bailey	Succeeded by Frederick Villiers Meynell; David Sombre
Preceded by Robert Aglionby Slaney; Richard Jenkins	Member of Parliament for Shrewsbury; 1841–1847; With: Benjamin Disraeli	Succeeded by Robert Aglionby Slaney; Edward Holmes Baldock
Preceded by Robert Aglionby Slaney; Edward Holmes Baldock	Member of Parliament for Shrewsbury; 1852–1868; With: Edward Holmes Baldock to 1857; Robert Aglionby Slaney 1857–1862; Henry Robertson 1862–1865; William James Clement from 1865	Succeeded by James Figgins; William James Clement
Preceded by John Fildes	Member of Parliament for Great Grimsby; 1868–1874	Succeeded by John Chapman
Honorary titles
Preceded by Sir Charles Anderson	High Sheriff of Lincolnshire; 1852	Succeeded by Joseph Livesey
