= Roger Grainsby =

Member of the Parliament of England

Roger Grainsby was the member of Parliament for Great Grimsby in 1421. He was mayor of the town in 1418–9, 1425–6, and 1433–4.
