= Richard Barber (MP) =

14th-century English politician

Richard Barber was the member of Parliament for Great Grimsby in 1388 and mayor of that town.
