= Roger Dale =

Member of the Parliament of England

Roger Dale was the member of Parliament for Great Grimsby in 1414, 1416, and 1421.
