= Bob Lord (business executive) =

IBM Senior VP

- Born: Robert William Lord; March 12, 1963 (age 63); Hackensack, New Jersey, United States
- Education: Syracuse University (BS); Harvard University (MBA)
- Occupations: Senior Vice President, IBM
- Spouse: Robin Lord
- Children: Emily Lord, Andrew Lord, Paige Lord

Robert Lord (born March 12, 1961), is an American business executive, serving as a Senior Vice President at IBM. Lord oversees The Weather Company and Alliances, Watson Advertising and TradeLens. Prior to his current role, Lord served as Senior Vice President of IBM's Worldwide Ecosystems business, where he transformed the ecosystem business, making it a core element of IBM's go-to-market strategy. Kicking off his career at IBM, Lord served as the company's first Chief Digital Officer in 2016.

In 2015, Lord became President of AOL, leading the company through its development as a global advertising platform. Prior to AOL, Lord served as CEO of Razorfish in 2010, working with companies such as Cisco, Condé Nast, Ford, Mercedes-Benz and Pfizer. He is also the co-author of “Converge: Transforming Business at the Intersection of Marketing and Technology.”

== Early life ==
Lord was born in Hackensack, New Jersey, to Robert A. Lord and Pauline Ann Lord. He has two sisters, Cathie and Nancy.

== Education ==
Lord started his career as an engineer, graduating from Syracuse University with a BS in industrial engineering. While at Syracuse, he was an Industrial Engineering and Co-Operative Educations honors student and member of Sigma Chi (1981–1985). Lord achieved one of the fraternity's highest honors, The Significant Sig Award, which recognizes alumni whose exemplary achievements in their fields of endeavor have brought great honor and prestige to the name of Sigma Chi.

Furthering his education, he attended Harvard Business School and graduated with an MBA in Administration and Management.

== Career ==
In June 1983, Lord's first job out of college was a shift supervisor and industrial engineer at General Motors. After a year, Lord began working at Corning Inc. as a senior industrial project engineer and marketing project engineer. He worked in this role between June 1985 to September 1988.

In 1990, Lord went on to become the senior principal consultant and project manager at Symmetrix. After leaving Symmetrix in 1995, Lord became the area vice president of Contract Services for NovaCare until leaving in 1996. He then joined Advanced Rehab Services (later renamed Prism Rehab Services), where he served as chief operating officer until 1998 and served as executive vice president of Prism Rehab Services until 1999.

In 2000, Lord became the vice president of client support services for agility.com and left within the same year to become the vice president of corporate alliances and business development at Pretzel Logic Software. In November 2000, Lord left Pretzel Logic to become the executive vice president of North America Razorfish.

In 2002, he became the chief operating officer of Razorfish Inc. In 2003, Lord sold Razorfish to SBI Inc. and became executive vice president of SBI-Razorfish Inc.

In 2004, Lord became the East Region president of Razorfish, a subsidiary of aQuantive (AQNT). Three years later, he went on to serve as the East Region president of Razorfish, a subsidiary of Microsoft. In 2010, Lord became the global CEO of Razorfish, subsidiary of Publicis. Continuing his role as a CEO, Lord went on to serve as the global CEO of VivaKi Interactive at Razorfish in 2011.

During his time at Razorfish, Lord co-authored the book Converge: Transforming Businesses at the Intersection of Marketing and Technology (ISBN 978-1-4805-8982-7), which discusses how technology, media, and creativity are uniting and how this shift is revolutionizing marketing and business strategy.

In 2013, Lord left Razorfish to work as CEO of AOL Platforms. Then, in 2015 Lord became the president of AOL. Lord grew AOL revenues from $1.5 billon to over $3.0 billion through mergers and acquisitions and via organic growth. He oversaw the sale of AOL to Verizon for $4.4 billion in June 2015 and positioned AOL to become a world leader in the Mobile Media landscape. Following his career at AOL, Lord joined IBM.

== IBM ==
In early 2016, Lord started his career at IBM as the company's first chief digital officer. In this role, Lord oversaw the Digital Platforms team, Digital Sales organization, Digital Marketing, Routes to Market and Offering teams, and IBM's Developer and Startup Ecosystem.

In 2019, Lord became senior vice president of IBM's Worldwide Ecosystems. During this time, Lord also launched Call for Code.

Currently, Lord is the IBM senior vice president of The Weather Channel and Alliances. Under Lord's leadership, IBM Watson Advertising and The Weather Channel launched its approach to tackling bias in advertising. Lord spearheaded The Advertising Toolkit for AI Fairness, an open-source collection of data and fairness explainers that helps the advertising industry prevent and remove biases in their machine learning models. In 2022, Lord debuted this toolkit at the Cannes Lions International Festival of Creativity and co-hosted a panel discussion with actress Issa Rae to discuss steps companies can take the mitigate racial bias in AI and advertising.

Lord also serves as the Executive Sponsor for IBM's Black Business Resource group.

== Membership ==
Lord is an active member of the TED community and founding member of the Nantucket Project. He is a board member of the Partnership for New York City and Aqua Finance, board member for the Trustworthy Accountability Group (TAG) and former board member for Williams-Sonoma, Inc. and Screen Vision Media.

== Personal life ==
Lord is married to Robin Lord. They have three children, Emily, Andrew and Paige. Lord is active biking, surfing, golfing and competing in triathlons.
