= Walter Womersley =

British Conservative Party politician

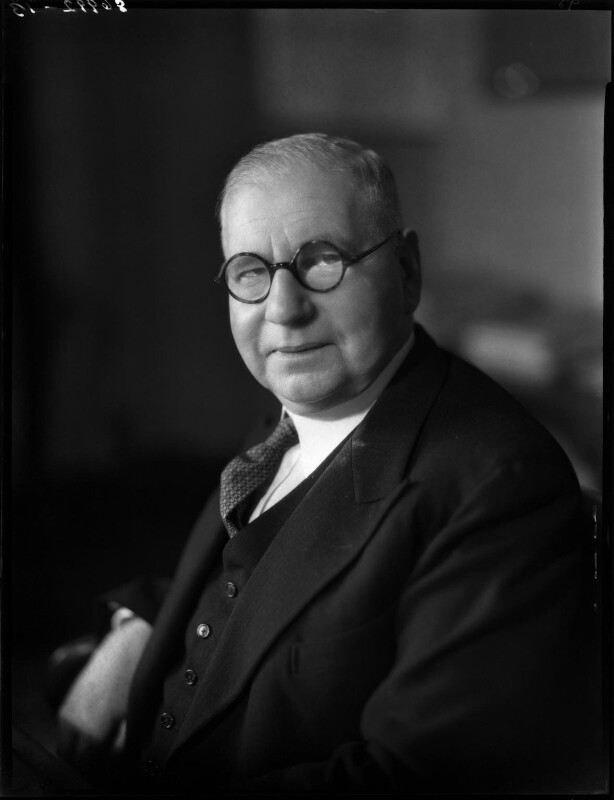
Sir Walter Womersley

Sir Walter James Womersley, 1st Baronet (5 February 1878 – 15 March 1961) was a British Conservative Party politician who served as Minister of Pensions during the Second World War.

He was born in Marley Street, Bradford, Yorkshire, the son of a carter. His working life started in mill as a 10-year-old, working half-time. He became a senior partner in a Grimsby firm of jewellers and merchants. He became Mayor of the town in 1922.

At the 1924 general election Womersley was elected as Member of Parliament (MP) for the Grimsby constituency. He served as a Junior Lord of the Treasury and Parliamentary Private Secretary to Sir Kingsley Wood. He was Assistant Postmaster General from 1935 until 1939. He was known as "Fish Womersley" for his championing of fishermen.

As Minister of Pensions from 1939, he was the only government minister to hold the same office throughout World War II, but lost his seat in the 1945 general election and was the last Conservative MP for the constituency of Grimsby, until the General Election of 12 December 2019, when Lia Nici was elected as a Conservative. He was knighted in 1934 and received a baronetcy in the 1945 resignation honours. In 1946 he was awarded the Order of the Dannebrog for services to the Danish fishing industry and fishermen, especially during the War.

His daughter, Dorothy Moseley (1911–2003), was also active in politics, at a local government level in Market Harborough, Leicestershire.

Parliament of the United Kingdom
Preceded by Tom Sutcliffe	Member of Parliament for Grimsby; 1922–1945	Succeeded by Kenneth Younger
Political offices
Preceded by Herwald Ramsbotham	Minister of Pensions; 1939–1945	Succeeded by Wilfred Paling
Baronetage of the United Kingdom
New creation	Baronet (of Grimsby); 1945–1961	Succeeded by Peter John Walter Womersley
