= Robert Burton (MP) =

14th-century English politician

Robert Burton (fl. 1380–1397) of Grimsby, Lincolnshire, was an English politician.

Burton was a member (MP) of the parliament of England for Great Grimsby in January 1380, 1385, February 1388, 1393, 1394, 1395, and January 1397.

Burton was Mayor of Grimsby in 1392–3.
