= John Heneage =

16th-century English politician

John Heneage (c. 1485 – 21 July 1557) was an English politician.

He was a member (MP) of the parliament of England for Great Grimsby in 1523 and 1529 and for Lincolnshire in 1539.
