= List of mayors of Grimsby =

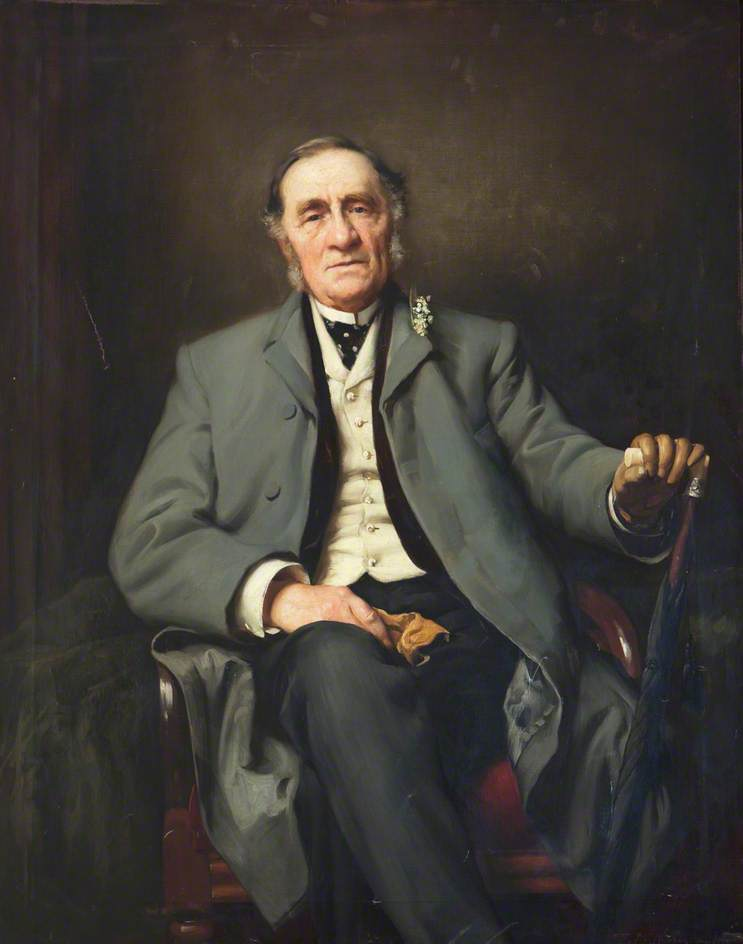
Painting of Edward John Bannister, Mayor of Grimsby (1868, 1869) completed in 1901/2

Below is a list of mayors of the town of Grimsby in the English ceremonial county of Lincolnshire.

The first recorded Mayor of Grimsby was in 1201. After 1835 the mayoral year usually began in November, although after 1949 it sometimes began in April or May.

The position became extinct in 1996 when Grimsby was merged with Cleethorpes to form the North East Lincolnshire Unitary Authority.

== Mayors of Grimsby ==
- 1218-19 Baldwin, son of Robert of Grimsby
- 1381-2, 1383-4, 1397-8: Geoffrey Askeby
- 1392-3: Robert Burton
- 1400-2: Simon Grimsby, MP for Grimsby
- 1512 George Barnardiston
- 1515 Thomas Barnardiston
- 1521 Willelmus Hattecliffe
- 1576: Thomas Moryson, MP
- 1582 Chris.Hattecliffe
- 1584 Johannes Hattecliffe
- 1596. Johannes Hattecliffe
- 1635: William Booth
- 1636: Gervase Holles, MP
- 1638: Gervase Holles, MP
- 1639: William Booth
- 1663: Gervase Holles, MP
- 1669: Frescheville Holles, MP

=== Nineteenth century ===
- 1835, Bransby Harrisson
- 1836, Thomas Bell
- 1837, William Brooks
- 1838, John Manton (retired)
- 1838, Thomas Bell
- 1839, William Bennett
- 1840, William Bennett
- 1841, Bransby Harrisson
- 1842, John Nicholson
- 1843, John Nicholson
- 1844, William Brooks
- 1845, William Brooks
- 1846, Thomas Bell
- 1847, William Heaford Daubney
- 1848, W. H. Daubney
- 1849, John Wintringham
- 1850, John Wintringham
- 1851, W. H. Daubney
- 1852, W. H. Daubney
- 1853, Robert Keetley
- 1854, Robert Keetley
- 1855, Charles Batholomew Moody
- 1856, C.B.Moody
- 1857, John Bell
- 1858, John Bell
- 1859, William Brooks
- 1860, Hildyard Marshall Leppington
- 1861, H.M.Leppington
- 1862, Henry Bennett
- 1863, Henry Bennett
- 1864, John Wintringham
- 1865, John Wintringham
- 1866, Thomas Oates
- 1867, Thomas Oates
- 1868, Edward John Bannister
- 1869, Edward John Bannister
- 1870, William Thomas Wintringham.
- 1871, W. T. Wintringham
- 1872, James Reed
- 1873, James Reed
- 1874, John Wintringham. The Wintringham schools, later Oasis Academy Wintringham were named after John Wintringham.
- 1875, Thomas Charlton
- 1876, Thomas Charlton
- 1877, Henry James Veal
- 1878, Henry James Veal
- 1879, Henry Bennett
- 1880, Henry Bennett
- 1881, William Jackson
- 1882, William Jackson
- 1883, Thomas Bell Keetley
- 1884, Thomas Bell Keetley
- 1885, Henry Smethurst, senior
- 1886, Henry Smethurst, senior
- 1887, Henry James Veal
- 1888, Henry James Veal
- 1889, Henry Bennett
- 1890, Henry Bennett
- 1891, George Shelton Dobson
- 1892, George Doughty
- 1893, George Doughty
- 1894, Enoch Palmer
- 1895, Enoch Palmer
- 1896, Jack Sutcliffe
- 1897, Jack Sutcliffe
- 1898, William Southworth
- 1899, William Southworth
- 1900, Harrison Mudd

=== Twentieth century ===
A list from 1900 onwards can be found in Cuppleditch's A Century of Grimsby

- 1901, Moses Abrahams
- 1902, Francis Evison
- 1903, Anthony Bannister
- 1904, Joseph Hewson
- 1905, Frederick William Riggall
- 1906, Jacob Pickwell
- 1907, Thomas George Tickler
- 1908, Frank Barrett
- 1909, Robert William Roberts
- 1910, James Whitley Wilkin
- 1911, Alfred John Knott
- 1912, Christopher Miller
- 1913, John Herbert Tate
- 1914, James William Eason
- 1915, Thomas Campbell Moss
- 1916, Joseph Barker
- 1917, Frederick Moss
- 1918, Frederick Moss
- 1919, John William Hobbs
- 1920, Franklin Thornton
- 1921, Joseph Henry Curry
- 1922, Walter James Womersley
- 1923, Richard Guy Kitching
- 1924, Frank Barrett
- 1925, Ernest Harrison
- 1926, Leslie Kingsford Osmond
- 1927, Leslie Kingsford Osmond
- 1928, Malcolm Guy Smith
- 1929, Isidore Abrahams
- 1930, Alfred John Knott
- 1931, Charles William Dixon
- 1932, Thomas Newby
- 1933, Cornelius Canning
- 1934, John Hogg
- 1935, John Wales Prior
- 1936, Thomas Sylvester Stone
- 1937, Charles Edwin Franklin
- 1938, Henry Weldrick
- 1939, John Joseph Sutton
- 1940, Charles Henry Wilkinson
- 1941, James Keay
- 1942, Edward Shaw Rudkin
- 1943, Max Bloom
- 1944, Charles William Hewson
- 1945, William Roberts
- 1946, John William Lancaster
- 1947, William Banks Bailey
- 1949, (May) Margaret Larmour
- 1950, William Henry Windley
- 1951, John Ashcroft Webster
- 1952, George Cedric Wilson
- 1953, George Herbert Atkinson
- 1954, Wilfred Harris
- 1955, John Cornelius Bernard Olsen
- 1956, (April) Wilfred Harris
- 1956, (May) Matthew Quinn
- 1957, John Henry Franklin
- 1958, Matthew Larmour
- 1959, Fred Goodfellow Gardner
- 1960, Reginald Swan Haylett
- 1961, George Herbert Pearson
- 1962, Elias William Marshall
- 1963, Cyril James Moody
- 1964, Jean Baxter Baillie McLaren
- 1965, Denys Eugene Petchell
- 1966, William James Molson
- 1967, Alfred Henry Chatteris
- 1968, Thomas Walter Sleeman
- 1969, Alfred Cyril Parker
- 1970, William Ernest Wilkins
- 1971, Lilian Trayer
- 1972, Florence Elizabeth Franklin
- 1973, Margaret E. Darley
- 1974, (Apr) Matthew Quinn
- 1974, (Apr) Ivor Hanson
- 1975, Alfred Neilson
- 1976, Peter Ellis
- 1977, Peter Willing
- 1978, Marjorie Elliott
- 1979, Chesney Aubrey Brocklesby
- 1980, Walter Banyard Smith
- 1981, Roy Bannister Cheeseman
- 1982, Roy James Ellis
- 1983, Anthony Jack Rouse
- 1984, Alexander MackieWebster
- 1985, Anthony Frederick Coleman
- 1986, Pauline Frances Ellis
- 1987, David Charles Casswell
- 1988, Sarah Campbell Woodliff
- 1989, David Andrew Currie
- 1990, Helen Douglas Hooton
- 1991, Kathleen Phoebe Bell
- 1992, Noel Granville Perkins
- 1993, Stephen J. Norton
- 1994, Alec Bovill
- 1995, John B. Colebrook
