= John Lufford =

Member of the Parliament of England

John Lufford was the member of Parliament for Great Grimsby in 1420.
