= Willielmus Grymesby (14th-century MP) =

Willielmus Grymesby was an English Member of Parliament (MP).

He was a Member of the Parliament of England for Great Grimsby in 1365, 1379 and 1382.
