= John Fildes =

British politician

John Fildes (1811 – 6 July 1875) was a British businessman and Liberal Party politician.

Fildes was a director of the Manchester, Sheffield and Lincolnshire Railway. At the 1865 general election, he was elected as the member of parliament (MP) for Great Grimsby, defeating the sitting Conservative MP John Chapman, who was another director of the Manchester, Sheffield and Lincolnshire Railway. Both candidates had canvassed vigorously during the campaign, with Fildes describing himself as a Liberal who had "ever supported measures conducive to the elevation and improvement of the condition of the people".

At the 1868 general election, no Conservative candidate stood in Grismby. However, Fildes was opposed by the Liberal George Tomline, who was described by The Times as a "formidable opponent". Tomline won the seat, defeating Fildes with a majority of 211 votes.

Parliament of the United Kingdom
Preceded by John Chapman	Member of Parliament for Great Grimsby; 1865–1868	Succeeded by George Tomline
