= Sir John Wray, 2nd Baronet =

English politician

Sir John Wray, 2nd Baronet (27 November 1586 – 31 December 1655) was an English politician who sat in the House of Commons at various times between 1614 and 1648. He supported the Parliamentary cause in the English Civil War.

== Life ==
Wray was the eldest surviving son of Sir William Wray, 1st Baronet, of Glentworth, by his first wife, Lucy Montagu, eldest daughter of Sir Edward Montagu of Boughton. He spent the last three years of his minority in foreign travel. He was knighted at Whitehall on 7 June 1612. In 1614, he was elected Member of Parliament for Grimsby. He succeeded to the baronetcy on the death of his father on 13 August 1617. In 1625 he was elected MP for Lincolnshire.

In 1627, Wray was High Sheriff of Lincolnshire, and on 15 February 1627 was placed on the commission for raising the forced loan in the county. He declined to act under the commission, to contribute to the loan, or to give security for his appearance before the council, and suffered in consequence a term of imprisonment in the Gatehouse Prison. In 1628 he was re-elected MP for Lincolnshire and sat until 1629 when King Charles decided to rule without parliament for eleven years.

In March 1636 Wray defaulted in payment of shipmoney. In April 1640 he was re-elected MP for Lincolnshire in the Short Parliament, when he was prominent as a zealous Presbyterian. He was re-elected MP for Lincolnshire for the Long Parliament in November 1640. He moved the "protestation" on 3 May 1641, subscribed £600 to the war fund on 9 April 1642, and took the covenant on 22 September 1643. He was a man of weight in the "eastern association" and in the propositions submitted to the king in July 1646 was nominated one of the conservators of the peace with Scotland. On their rejection he retired from political life and was excluded from Parliament after Pride's Purge in 1648.

Wray was one of the early patrons of Edward Rainbowe. Wray was not a republican. He approved the executions of Thomas Wentworth, 1st Earl of Strafford and William Laud, but not of the king.

== Family ==
By his wife (married in September 1607) Grisilla, only daughter of Sir Hugh Bethell of Ellerton, Yorkshire, he had eight daughters and four sons:

- Frances Wray (born December 1611), married on 13 January 1631 (N.S.) Capt. John Hotham
- William Wray (October 1613 – November 1613) (d.s.p.)
- Elizabeth Wray (August 1615 – February/March 1617 N.S.)
- Anne Wray (April 1617 – June/July 1621)
- Sir John Wray, 3rd Baronet (1619–1664)
- Theophilus Wray (June/July 1624 – 21 November 1664) (d.s.p.)
- William Wray (b. July 1626) (d.s.p.)
- Theodosia Wray (born January 1631 N.S.), married Sir Richard Barker in 1660.
- Bethell Wray (d.s.p.)
- Grisilla Wray, married on 19 December 1654 Anthony Thorold of Marston, Lincs. (died 1670) and had issue.

His heir, Sir John Wray, 3rd Baronet, captain in the parliamentary army, and member for Lincolnshire in the parliament of 1654–5, died in 1664, having married, first, Elizabeth, widow of Sir Simonds D'Ewes; and, secondly, in 1661, Sarah, daughter of Sir John Evelyn of West Dean, Wiltshire. His sole surviving issue was a daughter by his second wife, Elizabeth, wife of Nicholas Saunderson, eldest son of George Saunderson, 5th Viscount Castleton. On her death without surviving issue the Glentworth estates passed by entail to her next heir male, Sir Cecil Wray, 11th Baronet.

Parliament of England
Preceded by Sir William Wray; Sir George St Paul	Member of Parliament for Great Grimsby; 1614; With: Sir Christopher Wray	Succeeded by Henry Pelham; Sir Christopher Wray
Preceded by Montagu Bertie; Sir Thomas Grantham	Member of Parliament for Lincolnshire; 1625; With: Sir Nicholas Saunderson Bt	Succeeded by John Monson; Sir William Airmine
Preceded by John Monson; Sir William Airmine	Member of Parliament for Lincolnshire; 1628–1629; With: Sir William Airmine	Parliament suspended until 1640
Vacant Parliament suspended since 1629	Member of Parliament for Lincolnshire; 1640–1648; With: Sir Edward Hussey 1640; Sir Edward Ayscough 1640–1648	Not represented in Rump Parliament
Baronetage of England
Preceded by William Wray	Baronet (of Glentworth); 1617–1655	Succeeded by John Wray
