= Gilbert Keremond =

Member of the Parliament of England

Gilbert Keremond served as a member of Parliament for Great Grimsby in 1413 and 1416. He also held the position of mayor of the town.
