= Richard Misen =

Member of the Parliament of England

Richard Misen was the member of Parliament and mayor of Great Grimsby in 1390.
