= Geoffrey Askeby =

14th-century English politician

Geoffrey Askeby was the member of Parliament for Great Grimsby in 1378, October 1383, and September 1388; and Mayor of Grimsby in 1381–2, 1383–4, and 1397–8.
