= William Maxfield =

William Maxfield was a British Whig politician.

At the 1832 general election he was elected as a Member of Parliament (MP) for Grimsby, defeating the Tory MP Lord Loughborough. He stood down at the 1835 general election.

Parliament of the United Kingdom
Preceded by Henry Fitzroy; Lord Loughborough	Member of Parliament for Grimsby; 1832–1835	Succeeded by Edward Heneage
