= John Cooke (lawyer) =

English lawyer

Sir John Cooke (29 August 1666 – 31 March 1710) was an English lawyer who served as King's Advocate under William III.

He was born the son of John Cooke of Whitechapel, London and educated at Merchant Taylors' School from 1673 and St. John's College, Oxford, from 1684. He temporarily left his studies to fight in Ireland for William III (1690), but returned to graduate B.C.L. in 1691 and D.C.L. in 1694. He was admitted a member of the College of Advocates at Doctors' Commons in 1694.

In 1701 he was knighted and appointed King's Advocate by King William, in 1703 appointed Dean of Arches, the judge who sits at the ecclesiastical court of the Archbishop of Canterbury, by Archbishop Tenison and in 1706 appointed for life to the position of Clerk of the Pipe in the Exchequer.

He died in 1710 and was buried at St. Mary's, Whitechapel. At the time of his death he was the Earl Marshal's surrogate (judge) in the High Court of Chivalry. He had married Mary, only daughter of Matthew Bateman of London, and had one daughter.
