= Robert Saunderson =

Member of the Parliament of England

Robert Saunderson was an English barrister from Lincolnshire who served one term as a member of the House of Commons of England for the Cornish rotten borough of West Looe. He was the brother of Nicholas Saunderson, 1st Viscount Castleton, and a nephew of Thomas Grantham.

Born after 1561, he was the second son of Robert Saunderson of Saxby and Fillingham in the West Lindsey district of Lincolnshire. He was educated at Broadgates Hall of Oxford University, and in 1579 was admitted to Lincoln's Inn. He corresponded with Michael Hickes, and is believed to have been politically connected to Robert Cecil, 1st Earl of Salisbury. He served a single term as MP in 1589 in the 7th Parliament of Queen Elizabeth I.
