= Richard White (fl. 1402) =

Member of the Parliament of England

Richard White was the member of Parliament for Great Grimsby in 1402.
