= Arthur Campbell-Walker =

Scottish soldier, politician and golfer

Lt. Col. Arthur Campbell-Walker FRGS (1834 – 2 April 1887) was a Scottish soldier, politician and golf player, who taught at the School of Musketry, Fleetwood.

Campbell-Walker was born in Forfarshire or Dundee. He was a keen golf player who has been credited with founding the Fleetwood Golf Club.

Campbell-Walker had a distinguished Army career. He was ensign in the 79th Foot (Queens Own Cameron Highlanders) and took part in the Crimea War. He was present at the siege of Lucknow during the Indian Rebellion of 1857. He was appointed as an instructor at the School of Musketry, and became an advocate of armoured trains as means of strengthening the coastal defences of the United Kingdom. He was subsequently Adjutant to two of the Rifle Volunteer forces, Northumberland, (1868–1877) and the Hertfordshire (1877–1883). He was captain and a Fellow of the Royal Geographical Society at the time of publishing Correct Card.

He married firstly to Katharine Maria Barlow (1844–1874), with whom he had four sons. He married secondly in 1883 in Steyning, Sussex, to Adelaide Lucy Katherine Marton Mowbray, widow of General Edward Mowbray R.A. At the time he was reported to be the "accepted" Conservative candidate for Westbury, but he did not take part in the election.

He twice unsuccessfully contested Great Grimsby, and in 1886, announced that he would contest Midlothian against William Ewart Gladstone on account of Gladstone's support for Irish independence; however, Gladstone ran unopposed.

He died in Brighton in 1887, when it was reported that, "He will be remembered as having fought two good battles in the Conservative cause at Grimsby, and his doctors believed that the last of these was most prejudicial to his health, even if it was not directly responsible for his death."

He was the brother of Col. Inches Campbell-Walker (1842–1911).

== Works ==
- The Rifle: its Theory and Practice (1864)
- Coast Railways and Railway Artillery (1865)
- The Correct Card: A Whist Catechism (1876)
