= John Hesilden =

Member of the Parliament of England

John Hesilden was the member of Parliament for Great Grimsby in 1391. He was a trader in the local speciality of cured herring.
