= John Miles (fl. 1404) =

Member of the Parliament of England

John Miles was a member of Parliament for Great Grimsby in 1404.

He and his fellow burgess, William Hosier, were returned to the so-called Unlearned Parliament, which Henry IV summoned to Coventry and from which lawyers were barred; neither man appears to have sat in Parliament before. In July 1397 Miles and a friend, Robert Gillesson, were brought before the Grimsby mayor's court for persuading a neighbour's servant to join them on a fishing trip and were ordered to pay the neighbour 5s. in compensation, well short of the 40s. he had claimed.
