= Walter Slotheby =

Member of the Parliament of England

Walter Slotheby was three times the member of Parliament for Great Grimsby in the 1390s.
