= King's Advocate =

The King's Advocate (or Queen's Advocate when the monarch was female) was one of the Law Officers of the Crown. He represented the Crown in the ecclesiastical courts of the Church of England, where cases were argued not by barristers but by advocates (see Doctor's Commons). In the nineteenth century much of the jurisdiction of the ecclesiastical courts was transferred to other courts, firstly the Courts of Probate and Divorce and Matrimonial Causes and eventually the Probate, Divorce and Admiralty Division of the High Court of Justice. The position of Queen's Advocate remained vacant after the resignation of Sir Travers Twiss in 1872.

== Use in colonies and extraterritorial jurisdictions ==
In some British colonies and extraterritorial British courts, the principal British Government lawyer was called the King's Advocate, Queen's Advocate or Crown Advocate. For example, before the British Supreme Court for China and Japan and in Malta the principal British Government lawyer was called the Crown Advocate. In Cyprus, he was referred to as the King's Advocate. The Attorney General of Sri Lanka was known as the King's Advocate or Queen's Advocate between 1833 and 1884.

== King's/Queen's Advocates ==
- incomplete before 1660
- 3 March 1609 Sir Henry (Martin) Marten
- 1625: Sir Thomas Ryves
- 1660–1678: John Godolphin
- 1679–1686: Thomas Exton
- 1687: Sir Thomas Pinfold
- 1687–1688: Thomas Exton
- 1701–1710: Sir John Cooke
- 1715–1727: Sir Nathaniel Lloyd
- 1727–1755: George Paul
- 1755–1764: George Hay
- 1764–1778: James Marriott
- 1778–1788: William Wynne
- 1788–1798: William Scott
- 1798–1809: John Nicholl
- 1809–1828: Sir Christopher Robinson
- 1828–1834: Sir Herbert Jenner
- 1834–1852: John Dodson (knighted 29 October 1834)
- 1852–1862: John Dorney Harding (knighted 24 March 1852)
- 1862–1867: Robert Joseph Phillimore (knighted 17 September 1862)
- 1867–1872: Travers Twiss (knighted 4 November 1867)

== Other sources ==
- Joseph Haydn and Horace Ockerby, The Book of Dignities, London 1894, reprinted Bath 1969, p. 422
- Edward William Brabrook, paper on the Office of the King's Advocate-General, delivered 16 January 1879, recorded in Proceedings of the Society of Antiquaries of London, second series, vol. VIII, p. 13-21
