= Charles Anderson-Pelham =

Charles Anderson-Pelham may refer to:

- Charles Anderson-Pelham, 1st Baron Yarborough (1749–1823), British politician
- Charles Anderson-Pelham, 1st Earl of Yarborough (1781–1846), founder of the Royal Yacht Squadron
- Charles Anderson-Pelham, 2nd Earl of Yarborough (1809–1862), British nobleman
- Charles Anderson-Pelham, 3rd Earl of Yarborough (1835–1875), British peer
