= Marmaduke Tyrwhitt =

Marmaduke Tyrwhitt (1533/4 – 1600) was an English politician who represented Great Grimsby as a Member of Parliament in 1558.
