= Tom Sutcliffe (politician) =

Tom Sutcliffe (2 July 1865 – 8 January 1931) was an English businessman and Conservative Party politician.

Educated at Haileybury and Oxford, Sutcliffe became head of the shipping company J. Sutcliffe and Sons.

He was elected at the 1922 general election as the Member of Parliament for Great Grimsby. He was re-elected in 1923, but did not contest the 1924 general election.

He served as High Sheriff of Lincolnshire during the years 1929–30, and died aged 65 on 8 January 1931 at a nursing home in Harrogate, West Riding of Yorkshire, England, .

Parliament of the United Kingdom
Preceded by Thomas Tickler	Member of Parliament for Great Grimsby; 1922–1924	Succeeded by Walter Womersley
