= Womersley baronets =

Baronetcy in the Baronetage of the United Kingdom

The Womersley Baronetcy, of Grimsby in the County of Lincoln, is a title in the Baronetage of the United Kingdom. It was created on 3 September 1945 for the Conservative politician and former Minister of Pensions, Walter Womersley. As of 2026 the title is held by his grandson, the second Baronet, who succeeded in 1961.

== Womersley baronets, of Grimsby (1945) ==
- Sir Walter James Womersley, 1st Baronet (1878–1961)
- Sir Peter John Walter Womersley, 2nd Baronet (born 1941)
