= Sir John Monson, 2nd Baronet =

English landowner and politician (1599–1683)

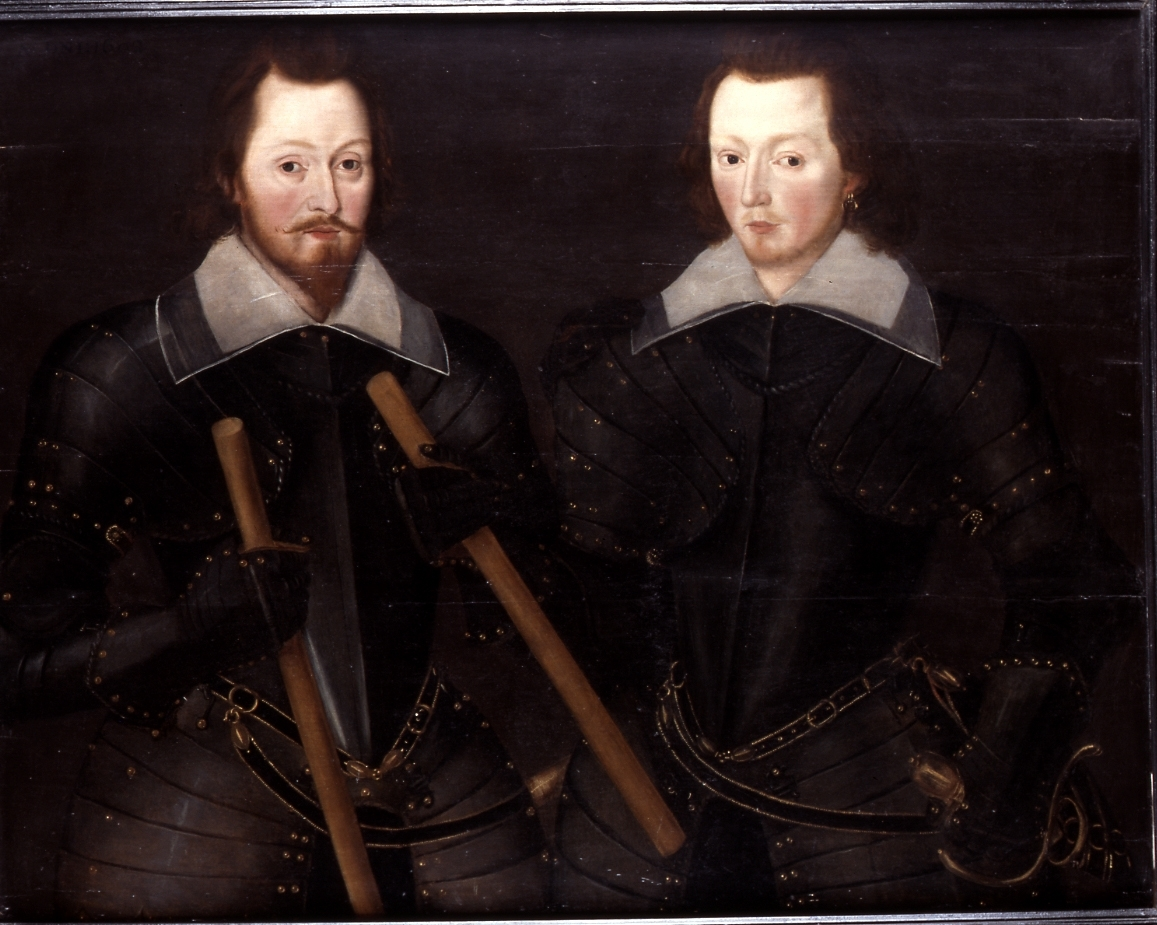
Sir John Monson (right) and his father Sir Thomas

Sir John Monson, 2nd Baronet (1599 – December 1683) was an English landowner and politician who sat in the House of Commons in 1625 and 1626.

Monson was born in the parish of St Sepulchre's, London, the son of Sir Thomas Monson, 1st Baronet of South Carlton, Lincolnshire and his wife Margaret Anderson, the daughter of Sir Edmund Anderson. He studied law. In 1625, he was elected Member of Parliament for Lincoln. He was elected MP for Lincolnshire in 1626. He was appointed Knight of the Order of the Bath at the coronation of King Charles I on 2 February 1627.

In May 1641 he succeeded to the baronetcy on the death of his father. When the Civil War broke out, he retired to Oxford where was awarded D.C.L. from the University of Oxford on 1 November 1642. In 1645, acquired the estate of Broxbourne through his wife's inheritance and subsequently resided there. He was concerned in the surrender of the Royalist garrison at Oxford to the Parliamentary army in 1646.

Monson died at the age of 84 and was buried at South Carlton on 29 December 1683. His widow was buried there on 10 December 1692.

Monson married in about 1625 Ursula Oxenbridge, daughter of Sir Robert Oxenbridge of Hurstbourne Priors, Hampshire and his wife Elizabeth Cook, daughter of Sir Henry Coke of Broxbourne.

Parliament of England
Preceded by Sir Lewis Watson; Thomas Hatcher	Member of Parliament for Lincoln; 1625; With: Sir Thomas Grantham	Succeeded by Sir Thomas Grantham; Robert Monson
Preceded by Sir John Wray; Sir Nicholas Saunderson Bt	Member of Parliament for Lincolnshire; 1626; With: Sir William Airmine	Succeeded by Sir John Wray; Sir William Airmine
Baronetage of England
Preceded by Thomas Monson	Baronet (of Carleton); 1641–1683	Succeeded by Henry Monson
