= James St Clair-Erskine, 3rd Earl of Rosslyn =

Scottish soldier and Tory politician

The Right Honourable The Earl of Rosslyn PC DL

Master of the Buckhounds
- In office 10 September 1841 – 29 June 1846
- Monarch: Victoria
- Prime Minister: Sir Robert Peel
- Preceded by: The Lord Kinnaird
- Succeeded by: The Earl Granville
- In office 28 February 1852 – 17 December 1852
- Monarch: Victoria
- Prime Minister: The Earl of Derby
- Preceded by: The Earl of Bessborough
- Succeeded by: The Earl of Bessborough

Member of the House of Lords Lord Temporal
- In office 18 January 1837 – 16 June 1866; Hereditary Peerage
- Preceded by: The 2nd Earl of Rosslyn
- Succeeded by: The 4th Earl of Rosslyn

Personal details
- Born: 15 February 1802
- Died: 16 June 1866 (aged 64)
- Party: Tory
- Spouse: Frances Wemyss (m. 1826; died 1858)
- Children: 3, including Robert
- Parent(s): James St Clair-Erskine, 2nd Earl of Rosslyn; Harriet Elizabeth Bouverie

General James Alexander St Clair-Erskine, 3rd Earl of Rosslyn PC, DL (15 February 1802 – 16 June 1866), styled Lord Loughborough from 1805 to 1837, was a Scottish soldier and Tory politician. A General in the British Army, he also held political office as Master of the Buckhounds between 1841 and 1846 and again in 1852 and as Under-Secretary of State for War in 1859.

== Early life ==
Rosslyn was the son of James St Clair-Erskine, 2nd Earl of Rosslyn, by his wife Harriet Elizabeth Bouverie, daughter of the Hon. Edward Bouverie (the second son of Jacob Bouverie, 1st Viscount Folkestone).

== Career ==
Rosslyn entered the British Army in 1819. He purchased a captaincy in the 9th Light Dragoons in 1823 and a lieutenant-colonelcy in 1828. He was promoted to Major-General in 1854, to Lieutenant-General in 1859 and to full General on 20 April 1866.

In 1864 he was appointed Regimental Colonel of the 7th Queen's Own Hussars after the death of General Sir William Tuyll. Lord Rosslyn also commanded the Auxiliary Cavalry Regiment, The Fife Mounted Rifle Volunteers from 1860 until his death in 1866.

=== Political career ===
Rosslyn was returned to Parliament for Dysart Burghs, in Fife, in 1830, a seat he held until 1831, and then represented Grimsby from 1831 to 1832. He succeeded his father in the earldom in 1837. In 1841 he was sworn of the Privy Council and appointed Master of the Buckhounds under Sir Robert Peel, which he remained until the government fell in 1846. He held the same office from February to December 1852 under Lord Derby, and was briefly Under-Secretary of State for War under Derby from March to June 1859.

Lord Rosslyn was also a Deputy Lieutenant for Fife.

== Personal life ==
In 1826, James married Frances Wemyss (1794–1858), daughter of Lt.-Gen. William Wemyss, of Wemyss Castle, Fife. Together, they were the parents of two sons and a daughter, including:

- Hon. James Alexander George St Clair-Erskine (1830–1851), styled Lord Loughborough, a Lieut. who died unmarried.
- Robert Francis St Clair-Erskine, 4th Earl of Rosslyn, who married Blanche Adeliza FitzRoy, great-granddaughter of Augustus FitzRoy, 3rd Duke of Grafton and widow of Col. Hon. Charles Henry Maynard.
- Lady Harriet Elizabeth St Clair-Erskine (d. 1867), who married Prince Georg Münster, Hereditary Marshal of Hanover and Hanoverian Ambassador to London (d. 1902) in 1865.

Lady Rosslyn died on 30 September 1858 and Lord Rosslyn died, several years later, in June 1866, aged 64. He was succeeded in the earldom by his only surviving son, Robert.

Parliament of the United Kingdom
Preceded by Sir Ronald Crauford Ferguson	Member of Parliament for Dysart Burghs; 1830–1831	Succeeded by Robert Ferguson
Preceded by George Harris; John Shelley	Member of Parliament for Grimsby; 1831–1832; With: Henry Fitzroy	Succeeded by William Maxfield
Political offices
Preceded by The Lord Kinnaird	Master of the Buckhounds; 1841–1846	Succeeded by The Earl Granville
Preceded by The Earl of Bessborough	Master of the Buckhounds; February–December 1852	Succeeded by The Earl of Bessborough
Preceded by The Viscount Hardinge	Under-Secretary of State for War; March–June 1859	Succeeded by The Earl de Grey and Ripon
Peerage of the United Kingdom
Preceded by James St Clair-Erskine	Earl of Rosslyn; 1837–1866	Succeeded by Robert St Clair-Erskine
