= William Paule =

English politician

William Paule (fl. 1388) of Grimsby, Lincolnshire, was an English politician.

He was a member (MP) of the parliament of England for Great Grimsby in February 1388.
