= Thomas Hatcliffe =

16th-century English politician

Thomas Hatcliffe (c. 1550 – 1610) was the member of Parliament for Great Grimsby in 1597. He was a justice of the peace for Lindsey, Lincolnshire.
