= John Newland (fl. 1384–1386) =

English politician

John Newland (fl. 1384–1386) of Grimsby, Lincolnshire, was an English politician.

He was a Member (MP) of the Parliament of England for Great Grimsby in April 1384, November 1384 and 1386.
