= William Fosse =

Member of the Parliament of England

William Fosse was an English lawyer and the member of Parliament for Great Grimsby in 1407 and 1411. He served six terms as the mayor of the town.
