= Gervase Holles =

English lawyer, antiquarian and politician

Gervase Holles (9 March 1607 – 10 February 1675) was an English lawyer, antiquarian and politician who sat in the House of Commons from 1640 to 1642. He fought in the Royalist army in the English Civil War.

Holles was the son of Frescheville Holles of Grimsby, Lincolnshire and was baptised at Grimsby on 13 March 1607. He was Mayor of Grimsby in 1636, 1638 and was called to the bar at Middle Temple in 1639.

In April 1640, Holles was elected Member of Parliament for Grimsby in the Short Parliament. He was re-elected MP for Grimsby for the Long Parliament in November 1640. He supported the King and was disabled in August, 1642. He was awarded MA at Oxford University on 1 November 1642 and served as colonel of foot to Charles I and Louis XIV. He was an antiquary and during his exile in Holland wrote on historical subjects including Parentela Hollesiorum and Lincolnshire Church Notes.

After the Restoration, Holles was re-elected MP for Grimsby in 1661 for the Cavalier Parliament and sat until his death in 1675. In 1663, he was Mayor of Grimsby for the third and last time. He was secretary of petitions to Charles II and one of the Masters of Requests.

Holles died at the age of 67 and was buried at Mansfield, Nottinghamshire.

Holles married twice. His second wife was Elizabeth Molesworth and their only son, Frescheville, was also Mayor and MP for Grimsby.

Parliament of England
Vacant Parliament suspended since 1629	Member of Parliament for Grimsby; 1640–1642; With: Christopher Wray	Succeeded by William Wray; Edward Rossiter
Preceded by Edward King; William Wray	Member of Parliament for Grimsby; 1661–1675; With: Adrian Scrope 1661–66; Sir Henry Belasyse 1666–67; Sir Philip Tyrwhitt 1667; Sir Frescheville Holles 1667–72; William Broxholme 1673–75	Succeeded by William Broxholme; Sir Christopher Wray
