= John Kelby =

Member of the Parliament of England

John Kelby was the member of Parliament for Great Grimsby in 1393, 1397, 1402 and 1406, and the bailiff of that town for 1393–94.
