= NovaCare Rehabilitation =

- Type: Division of Select Medical Corporation
- Industry: Healthcare
- Headquarters: Mechanicsburg, Pennsylvania, United States
- Products: Specialty Healthcare Services
- Parent: Select Medical Corporation
- Website: www.novacare.com

NovaCare Rehabilitation is a division of the Select Medical Corporation. NovaCare Rehabilitation operates as part of Select Medical Corporation's Outpatient Division, which includes approximately 1900 locations in 37 states and the District of Columbia and operates primarily as Select Physical Therapy, NovaCare Rehabilitation, Kessler Rehabilitation Center, First Choice Rehabilitation, Saco Bay Physical Therapy and KORT. Select Medical acquired the company in 1999.
