= Edward Skipwith =

Member of the Parliament of England

Edward Skipwith was the member of Parliament for Great Grimsby in 1601.
