= Robert Lord (MP) =

16th-century English politician

Robert Lord (by 1495 – 1531 or later), of Great Grimsby, Lincolnshire, was an English politician.

He was a member (MP) of the parliament of England for Great Grimsby in 1523.
