= William Lele =

Member of the Parliament of England

William Lele was the member of Parliament for Great Grimsby in 1406.
