= John Thoresby (burgess) =

Member of the Parliament of England

John Thoresby was a burgess of Great Grimsby who served briefly as one of its two members of parliament in 1411.
