= Edward Heneage (1802–1880) =

British Whig politician

Edward Heneage (24 July 1802 – 25 June 1880) was a British Whig politician.

Heneage was the son of George Robert Heneage (1768–1833) and his wife Frances Anne Ainslie. He was educated at Eton College.

At the 1835 general election he was elected unopposed as a Member of Parliament (MP) for Grimsby, a seat which had been held from 1826 to 1830 by his older brother George. He was re-elected unopposed in 1841 and 1847, but was defeated in a contest in 1852.

== Personal life ==
Heneage was married twice, firstly on 11 April 1840 to Charlotte Frances Anne Rolleston (died January 1853), daughter of Colonel Lancelot Rolleston and Caroline Chetwynd. On 25 August 1853 he married again, to Renee Elizabeth Levina Hoare, daughter of Captain Richard Hoare and Matilda Ottley Fahie.

Parliament of the United Kingdom
Preceded by William Maxfield	Member of Parliament for Grimsby; 1835–1852	Succeeded by Earl Annesley
