= Girolamo Conestaggio =

Girolamo Franchi di Conestaggio (Latin: Hieronymus Conestagius; 1530 – c.1616) was a Genoese merchant and scholar.

A nobleman, he was also a merchant and spent time on business in Antwerp. He participated in the Accademia dei Confusi, a literary circle, headed by Stefano Ambrogio Schiappalaria.

== Works ==
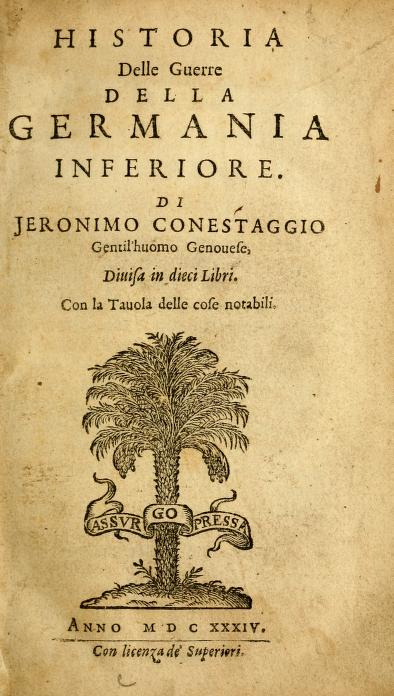
Title page of Historia delle guerre de Germania Inferiore (1614)

Dell' Unione del Reyno de Portogallo alia Corona di Castiglia (Genoa, 1585), was a chronicle of the Portuguese succession crisis of 1580, and a work that provoked a number of replies, in particular from Jerónimo de Mendonça; it was considered pro-Spanish, but Philip II of Spain tried to have it suppressed. It was translated into English as Historie of the Uniting of the Kingdom of Portugall by Edward Blount. It has been suggested that the real author was Juan de Silva, 4th Count of Portalegre. The work is now considered to be a reasonably objective account of the realpolitik of the Spanish annexation of Portugal, which noted Portuguese dislike of the events. An acceptable translation, from the Spanish point of view, was made by Luis de Bavia (1610), as well as versions in other languages.

Historia delle guerre de Germania Inferiore (Venice, 1614) was on the Dutch Revolt. It drew on sources written from the rebel point of view, and was criticised by Luis Cabrera de Córdoba as inaccurate.
