= William Welle =

Member of the Parliament of England

William Welle was the member of Parliament for Great Grimsby in January and October 1377, 1385, and 1391.
