= Frescheville Holles =

English Royal Navy officer and politician

Sir Frescheville Holles (8 June 1642 – 28 May 1672) was an English Royal Navy officer and politician who sat in the House of Commons from 1666 to 1672. He was killed in action fighting in the Anglo-Dutch war.

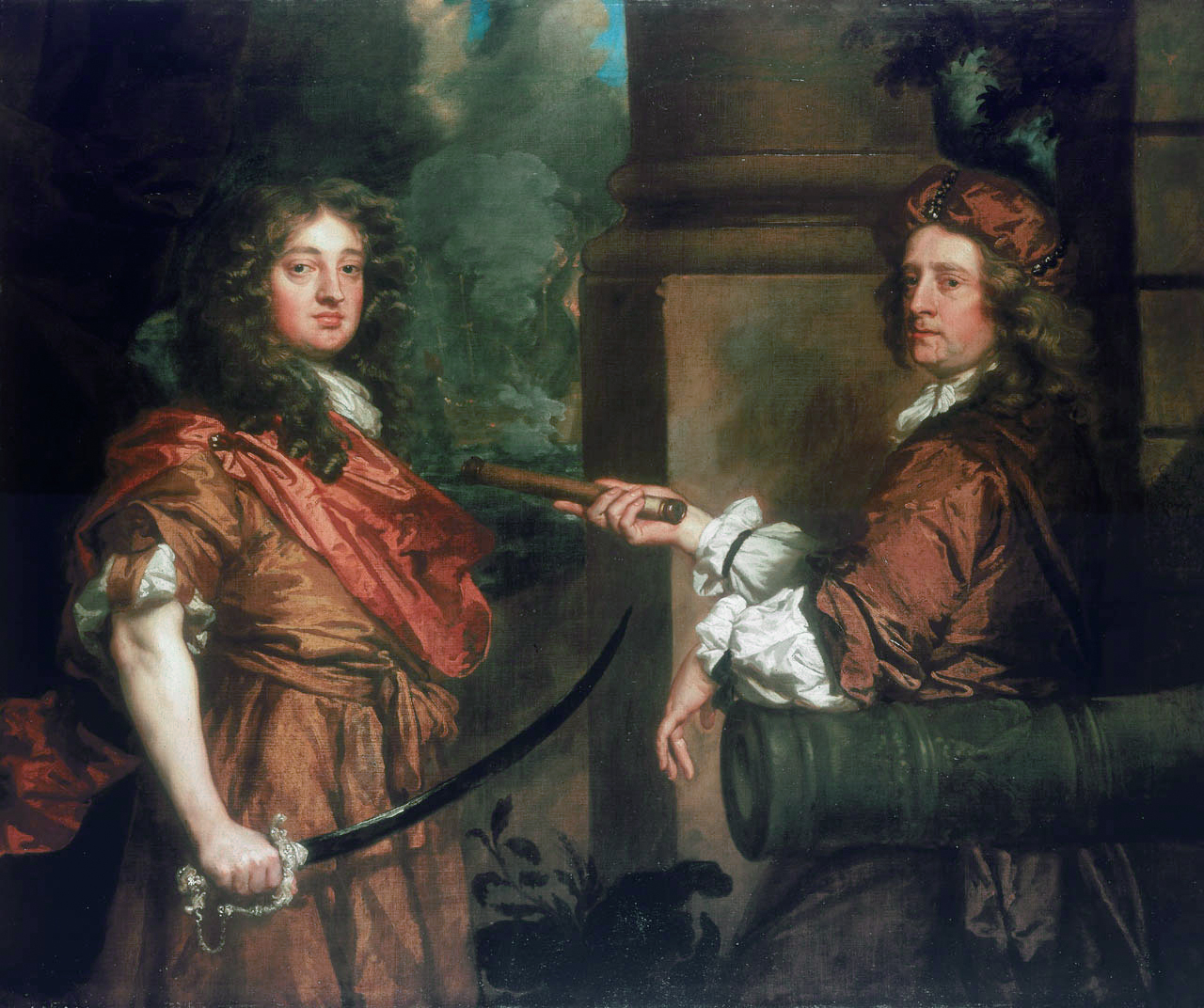
Sir Frescheville Holles and Sir Robert Holmes

Holles was the son of Gervase Holles and his second wife Elizabeth Molesworth. Gervase Holles had been Mayor and MP for Grimsby.

Frescheville Holles was a major in the Westminster militia and commanded a privateer called the Panther. He was recommended for the navy by George Monck, 1st Duke of Albemarle. and lost an arm at the Four Days Battle in 1666 while commanding HMS Antelope. He was knighted in June the same year (1666).

In 1667, Holles was elected Member of Parliament for Grimsby in the Cavalier Parliament. In 1667 he was also made a captain in the 2nd Foot Guards but lost his command in 1669, becoming Mayor of Grimsby that year instead in the footsteps of his father. In January, 1672 he was elected a Fellow of the Royal Society.

In March 1672, he and Sir Robert Holmes sailed from Portsmouth and attacked the Dutch Smyrna convoy in the English Channel on its return home. This foray had official sanction and led to the Third Dutch War. Holles was in command of HMS Cambridge at the Battle of Solebay on 28 May 1672 when he was killed at the age of 29. He was given a funeral in Westminster Abbey and was buried in St Edmund's chapel in an unmarked grave.

== Family ==
Holles married Jane, daughter of Richard Lewis, and widow of Valentine Crome, a London merchant.

Parliament of the United Kingdom
Preceded by Sir Philip Tyrwhitt, Bt; Gervase Holles	Member of Parliament for Great Grimsby; 1667 – 1673; With: Gervase Holles	Succeeded by Gervase Holles; William Broxholme
