= William Elmsall =

English politician

William Elmsall (fl. 1386–1399), of Grimsby, Lincolnshire, was an English politician.

He was a member (MP) of the parliament of England for Great Grimsby in 1386, 1395 and 1399.
