= Tristram Tyrwhitt =

16th-century English politician

Tristram Tyrwhitt (c. 1530 – 1590) was the member of Parliament for Huntingdon in 1571, Derby in 1572, and Great Grimsby in 1586 and 1589.

Tyrwhitt was a soldier.
