= Baptist Noel =

Baptist Noel may refer to:

- Baptist Noel (MP) (1658–1690), Member of Parliament for Rutland
- Baptist Noel, 3rd Earl of Gainsborough (1684–1714)
- Baptist Noel, 4th Earl of Gainsborough (1708–1751)
- Baptist Noel, 5th Earl of Gainsborough (1740–1759)
- Baptist Wriothesley Noel (1799–1873), English evangelical clergyman of aristocratic family
- Baptist Noel, 3rd Viscount Campden

== See also ==
- Earl of Gainsborough
- John Baptist Lucius Noel, mountaineer and filmmaker
