= Sir John Wray, 3rd Baronet =

English politician

Member of Parliament for Lincolnshire
- In office 1654–1654 Serving with Edward Rossiter, Thomas Hall, Thomas Lister, Charles Hall, Captain Francis Fiennes, Colonel Thomas Hatcher, William Woolley, William Savile, William Welby
- Preceded by: Sir William Brownlow; Richard Cust; Barnaby Bowtel; Humphrey Walcot; William Thompson
- Succeeded by: Edward Rossiter; Thomas Hall; Thomas Lister; Charles Hall; Captain Francis Fiennes; Sir Charles Hussey, 1st Baronet; Colonel Thomas Hatcher; William Woolley; William Savile; William Welby

Personal details
- Born: 21 September 1619
- Died: October 1664 (aged 45)
- Spouse(s): Elizabeth D'Ewes (died 1655) Sarah Evelyn (m. 1661; died 1664)
- Parent(s): Sir John Wray, 2nd Baronet; Grisella Bethell
- Education: Magdalene College, Cambridge

Sir John Wray, 3rd Baronet (21 September 1619 – October 1664) was an English politician who sat in the House of Commons in 1654.

== Early life ==
Wray was the son of Sir John Wray, 2nd Baronet and his wife Grisella Bethell. Among his siblings was Frances Wray (who married Capt. John Hotham), Theodosia Wray (who married Sir Richard Barker), and Grisilla Wray (who married Anthony Thorold of Marston, Lincolnshire). (died 1670).

His paternal grandparents were Sir William Wray, 1st Baronet, of Glentworth, and, his first wife, Lucy Montagu (eldest daughter of Sir Edward Montagu of Boughton). His maternal grandfather was Sir Hugh Bethell of Ellerton, Yorkshire.

He matriculated from Magdalene College, Cambridge at Easter 1635 and was awarded MA in 1636.

== Career ==
In 1654, Wray was elected Member of Parliament for Lincolnshire for the First Protectorate Parliament.

He succeeded his father as baronet in December 1655.

== Personal life ==
Wray married firstly Elizabeth (née Willoughby) d'Ewes (c. 1625–1655), widow of Sir Simonds d'Ewes of Stowlangtoft Hall and daughter of Sir Henry Willoughby, 1st Baronet and Elizabeth Knollys (a daughter of Sir Henry Knollys). From her first marriage, she was the mother of Sir Willoughby d'Ewes, 2nd Baronet. She died in 1655; they had no issue.

He married secondly, in 1661, Sarah Evelyn, daughter of Sir John Evelyn of West Dean, Wiltshire, by whom he left a daughter and heiress:

- Elizabeth Wray (1663–1714), who married the Hon. Nicholas Saunderson, eldest son of George Saunderson, 5th Viscount Castleton. On her death without surviving issue the Glentworth estates passed by entail to her next heir male, Sir Cecil Wray, 11th Baronet.

Wray died at the age of 45 and was buried at Glentworth, Lincolnshire on 29 October 1664. He was succeeded in the baronetcy by his cousin Sir Christopher Wray, 2nd Baronet, of Ashby. After his death, Sarah married Thomas Fanshawe, 2nd Viscount Fanshawe.

Parliament of England
Preceded by Sir William Brownlow; Richard Cust; Barnaby Bowtel; Humphrey Walcot; William Thompson	Member of Parliament for Lincolnshire; 1654; With: Edward Rossiter; Thomas Hall; Thomas Lister; Charles Hall; Captain Francis Fiennes; Colonel Thomas Hatcher; William Woolley; William Savile; William Welby	Succeeded by Edward Rossiter; Thomas Hall; Thomas Lister; Charles Hall; Captain Francis Fiennes; Sir Charles Hussey, 1st Baronet; Colonel Thomas Hatcher; William Woolley; William Savile; William Welby
Baronetage of England
Preceded by John Wray	Baronet (of Glentworth); 1655–1664	Succeeded by Christopher Wray
