= Thomas Hatcher =

English politician and army officer (c. 1589-1677)

Thomas Hatcher (c. 1589 – 1677) was an English politician who sat in the House of Commons at various times between 1624 and 1659. He fought on the Parliamentary side during the English Civil War.

Hatcher was the son of Sir John Hatcher of Careby, Lincolnshire (grandson of John Hatcher, sometime vice-chancellor of Cambridge University) and his wife Anne Crewes, daughter of James Crewes of Fotheringay, Northamptonshire. He was a student of Emmanuel College, Cambridge in 1603 and of Lincoln's Inn in 1607. He was elected member of parliament (MP) for Lincoln in 1624. In 1628 he was elected MP for Grantham and sat until 1629 when King Charles decided to rule without Parliament for eleven years.

In April 1640, Hatcher was elected MP for Stamford in the Short Parliament and was re-elected MP for Stamford for the Long Parliament in November 1640. He was one of the commissioners to Scotland in 1643, and was present at the Battle of Marston Moor and siege of York in 1644. He eventually reached the rank of Colonel. He was one of the members excluded from Parliament in Pride's Purge as being considered too moderate.

In 1654 Hatcher was elected MP for Lincolnshire in the First Protectorate Parliament. He was elected again in 1656 for the Second Protectorate Parliament and in 1659 for the Third Protectorate Parliament.

Hatcher married Katherine Ayscough, daughter of William Ayscough of South Kelsey, Lincolnshire on 14 October 1617. He had a son John and a daughter.

Parliament of England
Preceded by Sir Lewis Watson, Bt; Sir Edward Ayscough	Member of Parliament for Lincoln; 1624; With: Sir Lewis Watson, Bt	Succeeded by Sir Thomas Grantham; Sir John Monson
Preceded by John Wingfield; Edward Stirmin	Member of Parliament for Grantham; 1628–1629; With: Alexander Moor	Parliament suspended until 1640
Parliament suspended since 1629	Member of Parliament for Stamford; 1640–1648; With: Thomas Hatton 1640; Geoffrey Palmer 1640–1642; John Weaver 1645–1648	Succeeded by John Weaver
Preceded by Sir William Brownlow; Richard Cust; Barnaby Bowtel; Humphrey Walcot; William Thompson	Member of Parliament for Lincolnshire; 1654–1659; With: Edward Rossiter 1654–1659; Thomas Hall 1654–1656; Thomas Lister 1654–1656; Charles Hall 1654–1656; Captain Francis Fiennes 1654–1656; William Woolley 1654–1656; William Savile 1654–1656; William Welby 1654–1656 (Sir) John Wray 1654; Sir Charles Hussey 1656	Not represented in Restored Rump
