= Thomas Hall (MP for Lincolnshire) =

English politician

Thomas Hall (5 August 1619 – 28 September 1667) was an English politician who sat in the House of Commons at various times between 1654 and 1660.

In 1654, Hall was elected Member of Parliament for Lincolnshire in the First Protectorate Parliament and was re-elected MP for Lincolnshire in 1656 for the Second Protectorate Parliament. He was appointed assessment commissioner for Worcester in 1656.

In 1660, Hall was elected MP for Worcester in the Convention Parliament. He was appointed J.P. on 10 July 1660.

Hall died at the age of 48.

Parliament of England
Preceded by Sir William Brownlow; Richard Cust; Barnaby Bowtel; Humphrey Walcot; William Thompson	Member of Parliament for Lincolnshire; 1654–1656; With: Edward Rossiter; Thomas Lister; Charles Hall; Captain Francis Fiennes; Colonel Thomas Hatcher; William Woolley; William Savile; William Welby (Sir) John Wray 1654 (Sir) Charles Hussey 1656	Succeeded by Edward Rossiter; Thomas Hatcher
