= Charles Hall (Lincolnshire MP) =

English politician

Charles Hall (died 1 December 1669) was an English politician who sat in the House of Commons in 1654 and 1656.

Hall was probably the son of Thomas Hall of Barlow Lees, Derbyshire. He matriculated from Trinity College, Cambridge at Easter 1619 and was admitted at Lincoln's Inn on 15 November 1619.

In 1654, Hall was elected Member of Parliament for Lincolnshire in the First Protectorate Parliament and was re-elected MP for Lincolnshire in 1656 for the Second Protectorate Parliament.

Hall died in 1669 and was buried at Kettlethorpe.

Parliament of England
Preceded by Sir William Brownlow; Richard Cust; Barnaby Bowtel; Humphrey Walcot; William Thompson	Member of Parliament for Lincolnshire; 1654–1656; With: Edward Rossiter 1654–1656; Thomas Hall 1654–1656; Thomas Lister 1654–1656; Captain Francis Fiennes 1654–1656; Colonel Thomas Hatcher 1654–1656; William Woolley 1654–1656; William Savile 1654–1656; William Welby 1654–1656; John Wray 1654; Sir Charles Hussey, 1st Baronet 1656	Succeeded by Edward Rossiter; Colonel Thomas Hatcher
