= Sir Charles Hussey, 1st Baronet =

English politician

Sir Charles Hussey (1626 – 2 December 1664) was an English politician who sat in the House of Commons in two periods between 1656 and 1664.

Hussey was the son of Sir Edward Hussey, 1st Baronet of Honington and his wife Elizabeth Anton, daughter of George Anton of Lincoln. He was baptised on 30 October 1626. In 1646 he was admitted at Gray's Inn. His father died in 1648, but the baronetcy went to Hussey's nephew Thomas, son of his deceased brother Thomas. He was commissioner for assessment for Lincolnshire 1652. In 1656, he was elected Member of Parliament for Lincolnshire in the Second Protectorate Parliament. He was commissioner for assessment for Lincolnshire in 1657 and commissioner for militia for Lincolnshire in 1659.

Hussey was commissioner for assessment for Lincolnshire in January 1660 and commissioner for militia in March 1660. He was a J.P. for Kesteven from March 1660 until his death. From August 1660, he was. commissioner for assessment for Kesteven and commissioner for sewers for Lincolnshire. He was created baronet on 21 July 1661. In 1661 he was elected MP for Lincolnshire again in the Cavalier Parliament where he was an active member. He was commissioner for assessment for Lincolnshire from 1661 to 1663, commissioner for loyal and indigent officers in 1662, commissioner for complaints for the Bedford level 1663 and commissioner for assessment for Lincolnshire from 1663 until his death.

Hussey died at the age of 38 in London and was buried at Caythorpe where his estate was valued at about £2,500 p.a.

Hussey married by licence on 10 April 1649, Elizabeth Brownlow, daughter of Sir William Brownlow, 1st Baronet of Humby and had three sons and six daughters.

Parliament of England
Preceded by Edward Rossiter; Thomas Hall; Thomas Lister; Captain Francis Fiennes; Colonel Thomas Hatcher; William Woolley; William Savile; William Welby; John Wray; Charles Hall	Member of Parliament for Lincolnshire; 1656; With: Edward Rossiter; Thomas Hall; Thomas Lister; Captain Francis Fiennes; Colonel Thomas Hatcher; William Woolley; William Savile; William Welby; Charles Hall	Succeeded by Edward Rossiter; Colonel Thomas Hatcher
Preceded by Edward Rossiter; The Viscount Castleton	Member of Parliament for Lincolnshire; 1661–1664; With: The Viscount Castleton	Succeeded by Sir Robert Carr, Bt; The Viscount Castleton
Baronetage of England
New creation	Baronet (of Caythorpe); 1661–1664	Succeeded by Charles Hussey
