= William Montagu (judge) =

English judge and politician

Sir William Montagu (c.1618 – 26 August 1706) was an English judge and politician who sat in the House of Commons variously between 1640 and 1695.

== Life ==
Montagu was a younger son of Edward Montagu, 1st Baron Montagu of Boughton and his second wife Frances Cotton. He was educated at Oundle School and admitted to Sidney Sussex College, Cambridge on 15 April 1632. He was admitted to the Middle Temple on 22 October 1635.

In April 1640, Montagu was elected Member of Parliament for Huntingdon in the Short Parliament. He was called to the bar on 11 February 1642.

In 1660, Montagu was elected MP for Cambridge University in the Convention Parliament. He was elected MP for Stamford in 1661 for the Cavalier Parliament and sat until 1676. He became Attorney-General to Queen Catherine in 1662, holding the post until 1676. He was Treasurer of the Middle Temple in 1663 and Autumn reader in 1664. In 1676 he became Serjeant-at-Law and was Chief Baron of the Exchequer from 1676 to 1686.

He sat on the Bench at several of the Popish Plot trials, and appeared just as credulous as the other judges about the testimony of Oates and the other informers; but at the trial of Titus Oates for perjury in 1685, under pressure from Lord Chief Justice Jeffreys, he claimed that he had never thought Oates a credible witness. He is said to have pleaded for clemency in the case of the Dominican priest Lionel Anderson, convicted in 1680 of the capital crime of acting as a priest within England, since Lionel's father was a friend of his: Lionel, who was something a royal favourite in any event, was reprieved, but banished from England. Montagu was removed from the bench in 1686 because he refused to give an unqualified opinion in favour of the Royal Prerogative of dispensing individuals from the provisions of a statute, which was a crucial part of James II's policy of toleration for Roman Catholics. He was assessor to the Convention Parliament (1689) .

Montagu died in 1706 and was buried at Weekley.

== Family ==
Montagu married:

- Elizabeth, eldest daughter of Ralph Freeman of Aspeden, Hertfordshire; they had a son,
  - Christopher;
- Mary, (died 10 March 1699 – 1700) daughter of Sir John Aubrey, bart.; they had a son and a daughter,
  - William, married, 29 May 1670, Mary Anne, daughter of Richard Evelyn of Woodcote, Surrey, brother of John Evelyn the diarist, and died without issue in 1690;
  - Elizabeth, married Sir William Drake of Shardeloes, Buckinghamshire.

Legal offices
Preceded by Sir Edward Turnour	Lord Chief Baron of the Exchequer; 1676–1686	Succeeded by Edward Atkyns
Parliament of England
Vacant Parliament suspended since 1629	Member of Parliament for Huntingdon; 1640; With: Sir Robert Bernard, Bt	Succeeded by George Montagu; Edward Montagu
Preceded by George Monck; Thomas Crouch	Member of Parliament for Cambridge University; 1660; With: Thomas Crouch	Succeeded by Sir Richard Fanshawe, Bt; Thomas Crouch
Preceded by John Hatcher; Francis Wingfield	Member of Parliament for Stamford; 1661–1676; With: William Stafford 1661–1665; Peregrine Bertie 1665–1676	Succeeded by Peregrine Bertie; Henry Noel
Preceded by Sir William Drake; Edmund Waller	Member of Parliament for Amersham; 1690–1695; With: Edmund Waller	Succeeded by Edmund Waller; Montagu Drake
