= Wriothesley Noel, 2nd Earl of Gainsborough =

English peer and Member of Parliament

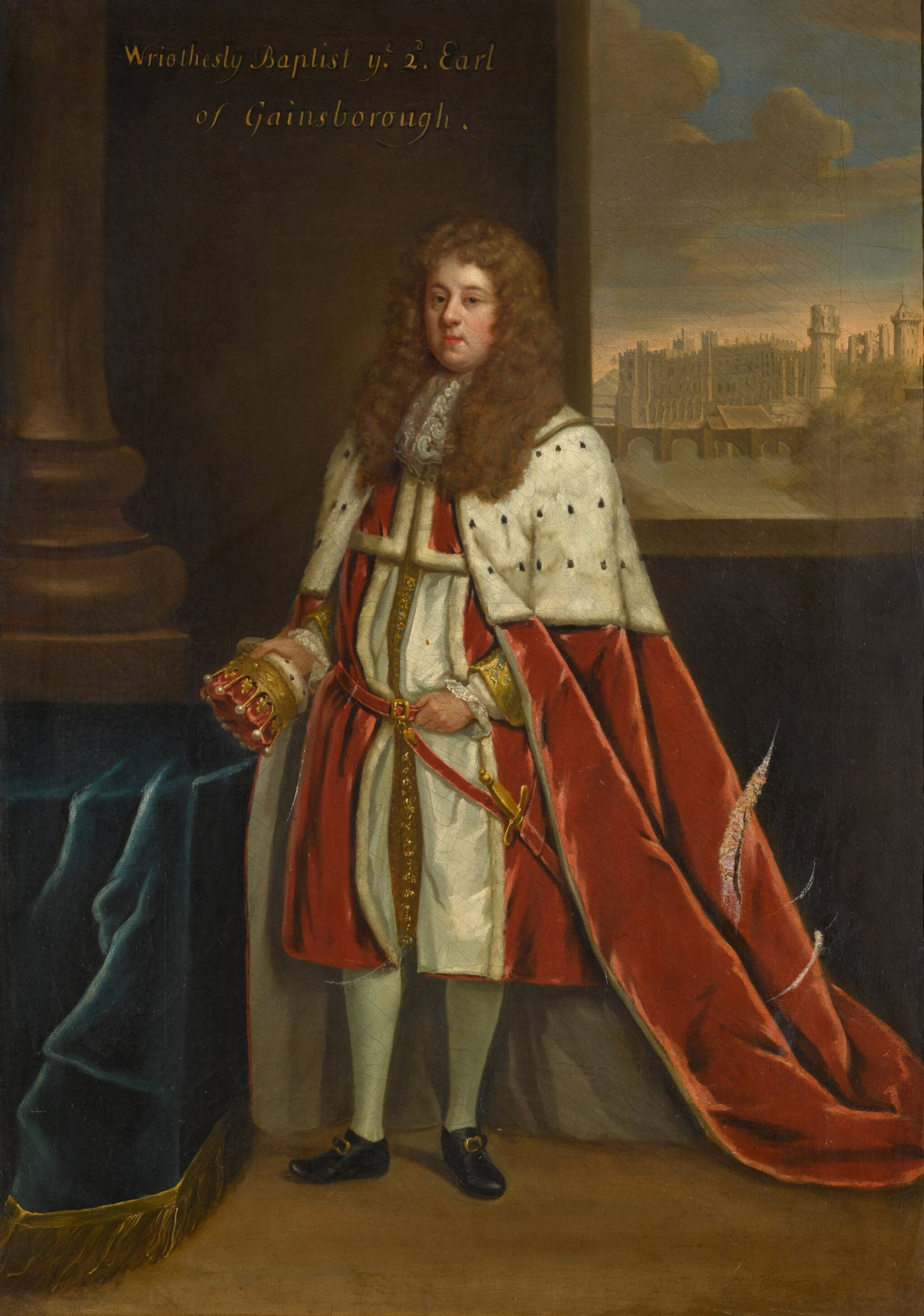
- Posthumous portrait of Wriothesley Baptist Noel, 2nd Earl of Gainsborough (by J. Henesy, 1737)
- Born: c. 1661
- Died: 21 September 1690
- Occupation(s): Aristocrat, politician
- Spouse: Catherine Greville
- Parent: Edward Noel, 1st Earl of Gainsborough
- Relatives: Hon. Baptist Noel (paternal uncle); Baptist Noel, 3rd Earl of Gainsborough (cousin)

Wriothesley Baptist Noel, 2nd Earl of Gainsborough (c. 1661– 21 September 1690) was an English peer and Member of Parliament, styled Viscount Campden from 1683 to 1689.

== Early life ==
Wriothesley Noel was born circa 1661. He was the son of Edward Noel, 1st Earl of Gainsborough.

== Career ==
Noel inherited the Earldom of Gainsborough in 1689. He was the MP for Hampshire 1685–1689. He was the Lord Lieutenant of Hampshire and Lord Lieutenant of Rutland.

== Personal life, death and legacy ==
Noel married Catherine Greville, daughter of Fulke Greville, 5th Baron Brooke of Beauchamps Court and Sarah Dashwood. He had no male heirs. His daughter Elizabeth married Henry Bentinck, who was created the 1st Duke of Portland in 1716. Noel died on 21 September 1690. He was succeeded by his cousin, Baptist Noel, 3rd Earl of Gainsborough, son of Hon. Baptist Noel and Susannah Fanshawe, daughter of Sir Thomas Fanshawe.

Parliament of England
Preceded by Sir Francis Rolle; Earl of Wiltshire	Member of Parliament for Hampshire; 1685–1689; With: Earl of Wiltshire	Succeeded by Earl of Wiltshire; Lord William Powlett
Honorary titles
Preceded by The Earl of Gainsborough	Lord Lieutenant of Hampshire; 1684–1687; With: The Earl of Gainsborough	Succeeded by The Duke of Berwick
Preceded by The Earl of Gainsborough	Lord Lieutenant of Rutland; 1685–1688; With: The Earl of Gainsborough	Succeeded by The Earl of Peterborough
Peerage of England
Preceded by Edward Noel	Earl of Gainsborough; 1689–1690	Succeeded by Baptist Noel
