= Richard Sutton (British Army officer) =

British Army officer

Richard Sutton (16 January 1674 – 23 July 1737), of Scofton, Nottinghamshire, was a British Army officer who fought in the War of Spanish Succession, and a politician who sat in the House of Commons between 1708 and 1737. He was primarily a Whig, but on occasion voted as a Tory.

== Biography ==
Sutton was the second son of Robert Sutton of Averham, Nottinghamshire and his wife Katherine Sherborne, daughter of Rev. William Sherborne, DD, of Pembridge, Herefordshire. His elder brother was the diplomat Robert Sutton.

Sutton was appointed ensign in Viscount Castleton's Regiment of Foot on 1 April 1690 and served in Ireland and in Flanders under King William III. He was afterwards promoted to major in the 8th Regiment of Foot, with which he served at the battles of Schellenberg and Blenheim in 1704, at the forcing of the French lines at Helixem in 1705, and at the Battle of Ramillies in 1706. Being afterwards promoted to the lieutenant-colonelcy, he commanded the regiment at the battle of Oudenarde in 1708.

On 23 March 1709 he was promoted to the colonelcy of a newly raised regiment and in 1710 nominated a brigadier-general. He commanded a brigade in Flanders during the campaign of 1711, served at the forcing of the French lines at Arleux, and at the siege and capture of siege of Bouchain. On 3 April 1712 he was removed to the colonelcy of the 19th Regiment of Foot, and the same year was nominated Governor of Hull, and commanded a brigade in Flanders under the Duke of Ormonde. in 1713–14 he was commander-in-chief in Bruges. He was afterwards promoted to the rank of major-general, but in 1715 he retired from active service. Sutton was restored to the colonelcy of the 19th Regiment on 27 October 1729, and promoted to the rank of lieutenant-general in 1735.

Sutton was returned unopposed as member of parliament for Newark at the 1708 general election. He voted for the naturalization of the Palatines in 1709 and for the impeachment of Dr Sacheverell in 1710. He lost the seat in a contest at the 1710 general election, but regained it at a by-election on 28 January 1712. Having taken his seat, he was appointed to a committee of inquiry into abuses in musters, clothing and army hospitals. He was re-elected MP for Newark at the 1713 general election but was probably absent on military duty throughout the Parliament.

Sutton was elected for Newark again at the 1715 general election but had to resign from his regiment on security grounds. He was returned unopposed at the 1722 general election. In 1724 he was appointed Clerk of the Green Cloth to 1726. He retained his seat in a close contest at the 1727 general election. He became a diplomat and was envoy to Hesse-Cassel from 1727 to 1729 and from 1730 to 1731, to Brunswick Wolfenbüttel in 1729 and from 1730 to 1731, and to Denmark in 1729. He was Governor of Guernsey from 1733 to 1735, and was returned again at the 1734 general election.

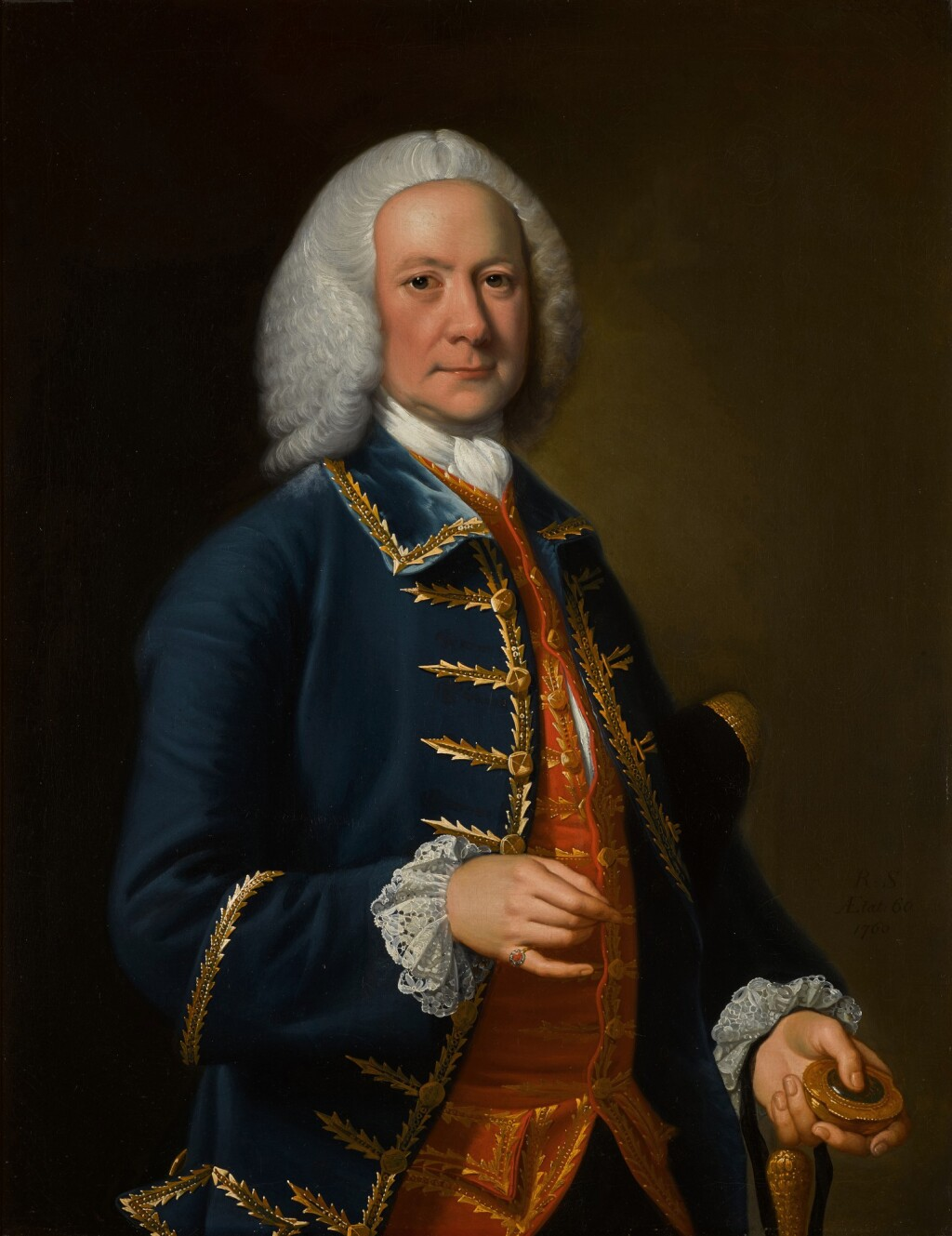
Robert Sutton (1699–1776), painting by Joseph Wright of Derby, 1760

Sutton married Catherine de Tolmer of Bruges before 1714. When he purchased the estate of Scofton, some delay arose in the transfer. As he was in the neighborhood with troops, he applied the adage 'possession is nine-tenths of the law', and sent a body of armed men to take and occupy the property. He died on 23 July 1737 and was buried at Averham, leaving two sons and a daughter. He was succeeded by his eldest son Robert.

Military offices
Preceded by George Macartney	Colonel of Sutton's Regiment of Foot; 1709–1712	Succeeded by James Leigh
Preceded by The Duke of Newcastle	Governor of Kingston-upon-Hull; 1711–1715	Succeeded by The Viscount of Irvine
Preceded by George Freke	Colonel of Sutton's Regiment of Foot; 1712–1715	Succeeded by George Grove
Preceded by George Grove	Colonel of Sutton's Regiment of Foot; 1729–1737	Succeeded by Sir Charles Howard
Preceded by The Earl of Cholmondeley	Governor of Guernsey; 1733–1735	Succeeded by The Marquis of Montandre
Parliament of Great Britain
Preceded by John Digby; James Saunderson	Member of Parliament for Newark; 1708–1710; With: James Saunderson	Succeeded by Sir Thomas Willoughby; Richard Newdigate
Preceded by Sir Thomas Willoughby; Richard Newdigate	Member of Parliament for Newark; 1712–1737; With: Richard Newdigate 1712–1715; Conyers Darcy 1715–1722; James Pelham 1722–1737	Succeeded by Lord William Manners; James Pelham
