= John Weaver (Stamford MP) =

English politician

Arms of Weaver, adopted c.1300: Or, on a fess azure between two cotises gules as many garbs of the field.

John Weaver (died March 1685) was an English politician who sat in the House of Commons at various times between 1645 and 1659. He supported the Parliamentarian side in the Civil War

Weaver was of North Luffenham, Rutland, and was admitted a freeman of Stamford, Lincolnshire on 25 October 1631. From 1643 to 1644, he was judge-advocate to the army of the Earl of Manchester. In 1645, Weaver was elected as Member of Parliament (MP) for Stamford for the Long Parliament. He became one of the recognised leaders of the Independents and remained in the House of Commons after Pride's Purge, although he refused to sit as one of the judges in the trial of King Charles I. From 1650 to 1653, he was one of the Commissioners for the government of Ireland. The officers of the Irish army petitioned for his removal on 18 February 1653 and on 22 February he was allowed to resign at his own request.

During the Commonwealth period, Weaver was elected MP for Stamford in 1654 for the First Protectorate Parliament, in 1656 for the Second Protectorate Parliament and in 1659 for the Third Protectorate Parliament. In December 1659, Weaver helped Anthony Ashley Cooper, 1st Earl of Shaftesbury and others in securing the Tower of London for the parliament, after the army had turned out the Long parliament. As a result, he became a member of the Council of State of 1659-1660. He stood for parliament at Stamford in 1660 for the Convention Parliament but the return was disputed and his election declared void.

Weaver died in 1685 and was buried at North Luffenham on 25 March 1685.

Parliament of England
Preceded by Sir Geoffrey Palmer, 1st Baronet; Thomas Hatcher	Member of Parliament for Stamford; 1645–1653; With: Thomas Hatcher 1645–1648	Succeeded by Not represented in Barebones Parliament
Preceded by Not represented in Barebones Parliament	Member of Parliament for Stamford; 1654–1659; With: Christopher Clapham 1659	Succeeded by John Hatcher; Francis Wingfield
