= James Saunderson, 1st Earl Castleton =

English landowner and Whig politician

James Saunderson, 1st Earl Castleton (c. 1667, Sandbeck, Yorkshire – 23 May 1723) was an English landowner and Whig politician who sat in the English and British House of Commons between 1698 and 1710.

Saunderson was the eighth and only surviving son of George Saunderson, 5th Viscount Castleton and his first wife Grace Belasyse, daughter of Henry Belasyse. He was educated at Laughton and was admitted at Magdalene College, Cambridge on 19 November 1681, aged 14 and admitted at Gray's Inn in 1686. He was appointed to the alienations office in 1689, probably to reward his father for his support of King William in the Glorious Revolution and succeeded to the stewardship of the manor of Kirton on the death of his elder brother, Nicholas, in 1693. He travelled abroad to Germany, Austria, Italy, Spanish Netherlands and France from 1695 to 1698. He attended Padua University in 1696.

Saunderson was returned as a Whig Member of Parliament for Newark at the 1698 English general election He was considered a Court supporter, and voted against the disbanding bill on 18 January 1699. He was defeated in the first general election of 1701 but succeeded in regaining his seat at the second general election of 1701. He was returned again in a contest at the 1702 English general election and was unopposed at the 1705 English general election. He held the office of Vice-Admiral of Lincolnshire from 1705 and the stewardship of the honor of Tickhill from 1708, retaining both for the rest of his life. At the 1708 British general election, he was again returned unopposed. He voted for the impeachment of Dr Sacheverell in 1710 and lost his seat again in the 1710 British general election. In 1711 he was a Commissioner for taking subscriptions to the South Sea Company. He did not stand at the 1713 British general election.

In 1714 Saunderson succeeded his father as 6th Viscount Castleton in the Irish peerage. He was created Baron Saunderson of Saxby, Lincolnshire in 1714, and Viscount Castleton in the English peerage in 1716. He was created finally Earl Castleton of Sandbeck in 1720.

Saunderson died unmarried at Richmond on 23 May 1723 'after a long illness'. All his titles became extinct and his estates passed to his cousin Thomas Lumley (later 3rd Earl of Scarbrough), who thereupon took the additional surname of Saunderson, by Act of Parliament.

Parliament of England
Preceded by Sir George Markham; Sir Francis Molyneux	Member of Parliament for Newark; 1698–1701; With: Sir Francis Molyneux 1698–1700; John Rayner 1700–1701	Succeeded by John Rayner; Sir George Markham
Preceded by John Rayner; Sir George Markham	Member of Parliament for Newark; 1701–1707; With: Sir Matthew Jenison 1701–1705; John Digby 1705–1707	Succeeded by Parliament of Great Britain
Parliament of Great Britain
Preceded by Parliament of England	Member of Parliament for Newark; 1707–1710; With: John Digby 1707–1708; Richard Sutton 1708–1710	Succeeded by Sir Thomas Middleton; Richard Newdigate
Honorary titles
Preceded by Thomas Saunderson	Vice-Admiral of Lincolnshire; 1705–1723	Vacant Title next held by The Lord Brownlow
Peerage of Great Britain
New title	Earl Castleton; 1720–1723	Extinct
New title	Viscount Castleton; 1716–1723	Extinct
New title	Baron Saunderson; 1714–1723	Extinct
Peerage of Ireland
Preceded by George Saunderson	Viscount Castleton; 1714–1723	Extinct
