= John Bell (Lincolnshire MP) =

English politician

John Bell (fl. 1380–1420) was an English politician. He sat as MP for Lincolnshire in May 1413.

He was the son of Walter Bell. By Easter 1386, he was married to Isabel and probably had at least one son. By APril 1405, he was married to Ibote.
