= William Tailboys =

Member of the Parliament of England

William Tailboys, de jure 7th Baron Kyme (c.1416 – 26 May 1464) was a wealthy Lincolnshire squire and adherent of the Lancastrian cause during the Wars of the Roses.

He was born in Kyme, Lincolnshire, the son of Sir Walter Tailboys and his first wife. Sir Walter had inherited considerable estates in Northumberland and Lincolnshire (with the main estate being at Goltho, Lincolnshire), and had been High Sheriff of Lincolnshire in 1423. William gained a reputation as a troublemaker, continually disputing with his neighbours, particularly Lord Cromwell, the ex-Treasurer.

He was Justice of the Peace for Lincolnshire and for Northumberland from 1441 and in 1445 became Knight of the Shire for Lincolnshire. However his unruly character led to his temporary imprisonment in the Marshalsea, London in 1448 for a series of murders and trespasses. He was also accused of having attempted to murder Lord Cromwell in the Star Chamber in 1449.

He espoused the Lancastrian cause and was knighted at the Second Battle of St Albans in 1461. He also fought at the Battle of Towton in 1461, escaped and was declared a rebel and had his property confiscated by King Edward IV. He was with Queen Margaret in Scotland in 1461 and was Captain of Alnwick Castle for the restored King Henry VI in 1462.

In 1464 he fought at the Battle of Hexham, where the Lancastrian forces were totally routed, but managed to escape the field. He was later discovered hiding in a coal pit near Newcastle with some 3000 marks (2000 pounds) of Lancastrian funds which had been intended as pay for the army. He was taken to the Sandhills in Newcastle and there beheaded.

He was buried in the Greyfriars' Church, Newcastle. He had married Elizabeth Bonville, daughter of William Bonville, 1st Baron Bonville. They had two sons, including his son and heir Sir Robert Tailboys, later de jure 8th Baron Kyme, to whom part of his father's forfeited lands was eventually restored.
