= Henry Noel (MP for Stamford) =

English politician

- Born: 1642
- Died: 20 September 1677 (aged 34–35)
- Occupations: Aristocrat, politician
- Spouse: Elizabeth Wale
- Children: 1 daughter
- Parent(s): Baptist Noel, 3rd Viscount Campden; Hester Wotton
- Relatives: Charles Boyle, 2nd Earl of Burlington (son-in-law)

Henry Noel (1642 – 20 September 1677) was an English politician during the reign of Charles II. A younger son of Viscount Campden, he inherited a large estate from an uncle in infancy. Returned as a court candidate for Stamford in an expensive by-election, he died less than a year later.

== Early life ==
Henry Noel was born in 1642. He was the second son of Baptist Noel, 3rd Viscount Campden by his third wife, Hon. Hester Wotton. He was baptized on 23 October 1642 at Exton, Rutland.

== Career ==
In 1643, he inherited Luffenham Hall, in North Luffenham, Rutland, from his uncle Henry, who died a prisoner of the Parliamentarians. He was admitted a fellow-commoner of Trinity College, Cambridge in 1660, and was considered for the proposed Knights of the Royal Oak at the Restoration, his income being estimated at £1,000 per year. Around this time, he made a gift of a fire engine to the town of Stamford, Lincolnshire.

In 1663, Noel was appointed a deputy lieutenant of Rutland, and to the commission of assessment for that county. In 1665, he was appointed to the commission for the enclosure of Deeping Fen, and was made a freeman of Portsmouth in 1668. In 1669, he was appointed a justice of the peace for Rutland.

In 1676, Hon. William Montagu, member for Stamford was appointed Chief Baron of the Exchequer, vacating his seat and necessitating a by-election. Noel contested the election with John Hatcher, a Presbyterian who had his own interest in the town, and was also backed by the strong interest of the Earl of Exeter. However, Noel's father Lord Campden and the Earl of Lindsey, supporters of the court party, lavishly treated the residents of Stamford and their friends, dismaying Hatcher, who could not match their expenditures and arranged to be appointed High Sheriff of Lincolnshire to escape from the contest. (Note: Sheriffs are disqualified from sitting in Parliament for constituencies within their own shrievalty.) Exeter switched his interest to a new candidate, William Thursby, who looked to have no better success; Hatcher put himself back into the race, hoping to delay the election long enough to obtain some advantage, but in vain. Noel was returned for Stamford on 27 February 1677, and Hatcher's petition against the result was disqualified due to his ineligibility as the Sheriff of the county.

Noel was appointed to the commission of assessment for Lincolnshire that year, but probably not to any committees in the Cavalier Parliament.

== Personal life and death ==
On 14 May 1671, he married Elizabeth Wale (d. 11 January 1681), the daughter and coheir of Sir William Wale (d. 1676), Vintner and alderman of London. They had one daughter, Juliana Noel, who married Charles Boyle, 2nd Earl of Burlington.

Noel died on 20 September 1677. He was survived by his daughter, but the Luffenham estate was entailed and passed to his half-brother, Hon. Baptist Noel.

== Notes ==
Parliament of England
Preceded by Hon. William Montagu; Hon. Peregrine Bertie	Member of Parliament for Stamford; 1677; With: Hon. Peregrine Bertie	Succeeded by Hon. Peregrine Bertie; Hon. Charles Bertie
