= Sir Robert Carr, 3rd Baronet =

English politician (1637–1682)

Sir Robert Carr Bt
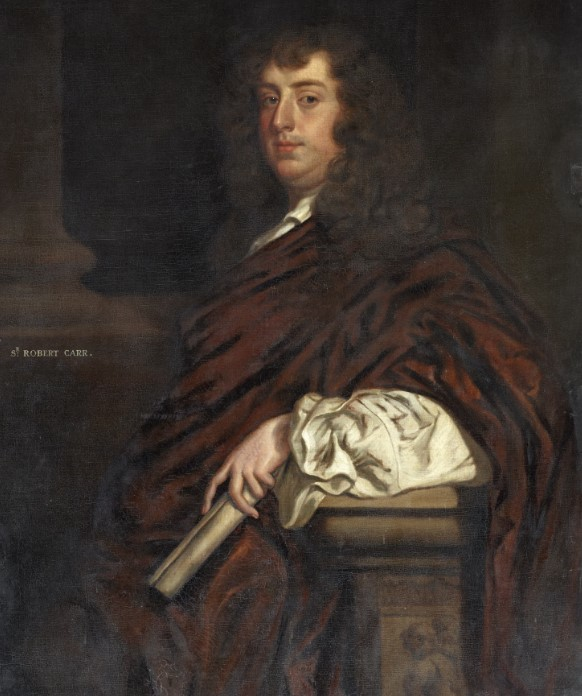
- c. 1670 portrait of Carr

Chancellor of the Duchy of Lancaster
- In office 1672–1682
- Monarch: Charles II
- Preceded by: Sir Thomas Ingram
- Succeeded by: Sir Thomas Chicheley

Personal details
- Born: c. 1637
- Died: 14 November 1682
- Parent(s): Sir Robert Carr, 2nd Baronet; Mary Gargrave

Sir Robert Carr, 3rd Baronet (c. 1637 – 14 November 1682) was an English politician of the Restoration period who served as Chancellor of the Duchy of Lancaster in the reign of Charles II.

== Early life and family ==
Carr was the only surviving son of Sir Robert Carr, 2nd Baronet and Mary Gargrave, daughter of Sir Richard Gargrave. He was educated at St John's College, Cambridge, where he was admitted as a Fellow Commoner on 6 March 1654, matriculated in 1655, and took his master's degree the same year. His father had been a Royalist and a supporter of the exiled king, Charles II. At the Restoration in 1660, Carr was identified as one of the potential Knights of the Royal Oak with an estate valued at £4,000.

In 1662 he married his mother's maid, Isabel Falkingham, with whom he had one daughter, Elizabeth Carr. In March 1664 he then married, likely bigamously, Elizabeth Bennet, daughter of Sir John Bennet and Dorothy Crofts. His daughter by this marriage, Isabella, married John Hervey, 1st Earl of Bristol. Through Carr's second wife's brother, Sir Henry Bennet (later Lord Arlington), Carr was afforded useful connections to the royal court. He was knighted at some point prior to 1665.

== Political career ==
In 1665 he was elected as a Member of Parliament for Lincolnshire on the anti-Presbyterian interest; he would hold the seat until his death in 1682. The same year he was appointed a deputy lieutenant for Lincolnshire. He became a very active member of the Cavalier Parliament, and was appointed to 391 committees and made over one hundred speeches.

On 14 August 1667 Carr inherited his father's baronetcy and estates, with an annual value of approximately £6,000. He established a London townhouse which became notorious for heavy drinking, and in 1667 Sir Henry Belasyse was killed in a duel after drinking with Thomas Porter and Carr.

Carr was an opponent of the Earl of Clarendon and took an active part in his downfall in 1667. He supported the motion for Clarendon's impeachment, both in the debate and vote. Carr led an inquiry into the miscarriages of the Second Anglo-Dutch War. In late 1669 he attended on the Duke of Albemarle to express the thanks of the Commons for the duke's service. From 1670 to 1671 he sat on a committee to consider the union of England and Scotland.

=== Member of the Court faction ===
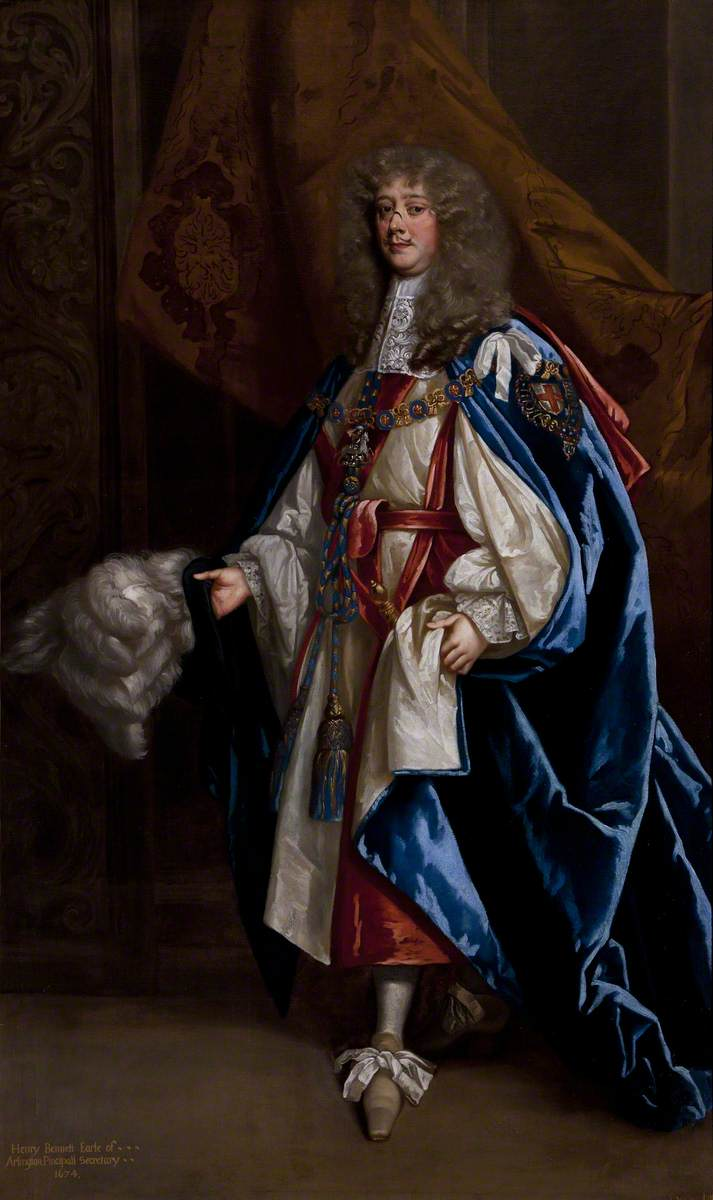
Henry Bennet, later the Earl of Arlington, who was Carr's brother-in-law and leader of the Court faction in parliament

In November 1670 he was one of five prominent MPs who crossed the floor to support the Court faction. In 1671 he was appointed a gentleman of the privy chamber, likely in reward for his sustained support for the king's policies. On 22 February 1672 Carr was appointed Chancellor of the Duchy of Lancaster and made a member of the Privy Council of England after his brother-in-law obtained a life patent for the role for Carr. Almost immediately, Carr was forced to support the Declaration of Indulgence to which he had previously been opposed. He later told the Commons that he "Likes neither the Papists nor the dissenters. But the Papists have fought for the King, the others have not; therefore would have more kindness for them."

In 1674, the French embassy reported that Arlington hoped to use Carr's prestige in the Commons to win support for the continuance of the Anglo-French alliance against the Dutch Republic. Despite this, there is evidence that Carr's sympathies were with the Dutch at this time. Carr spent much of the 1674 session defending his brother-in-law, Arlington, from impeachment by the Commons. He was also appointed to the committees to inspect the Scottish Army Act and to inquire into the condition of Ireland. In 1676, he incurred heavy betting losses at Newmarket Racecourse which forced him to mortgage most of his estate for £20,000.

Carr's support for the Court faction led to him being labelled "doubly vile" by Anthony Ashley Cooper, 1st Earl of Shaftesbury. Carr spoke repeatedly in support of increased supply; he helped to prepare the addresses asking the King to withstand the danger from France and promising a credit of £200,000 for developing a naval programme. He also spoke in the Commons against encroaching on the royal prerogative by demanding an alliance with the Dutch Republic.

=== Later career ===
On 12 June 1678 he was removed from the Privy Council after becoming caught in a scandal regarding the Earl of Lindsey's suspected use of militia to intimidate voters in Stamford. Nonetheless, following the Popish Plot, Carr defended giving commissions to Roman Catholic officers and supported allowing James, Duke of York to retain his seat in the House of Lords.

Carr continued to represent Lincolnshire in the Habeas Corpus Parliament and Exclusion Bill Parliament, during which he was a moderately active member. On 7 May 1679 he helped to prepare reasons for invalidating the pardon given to Lord Danby. He did not speak in the exclusion debate, but two months later he snubbed the Duke of York, who passed through Grantham on his way to Scotland. In 1680, Carr was restored to the Privy Council, but refused to convey the king's message to the Commons that the Exclusion Bill would be vetoed. He made no significant impact during the Oxford Parliament and died on 14 November 1682.

Parliament of England
Preceded by Sir Charles Hussey, Bt; The Viscount Castleton	Member of Parliament for Lincolnshire; 1664–1682; With: The Viscount Castleton	Succeeded by Sir Thomas Hussey, Bt; The Viscount Castleton
Political offices
Preceded by Sir Thomas Ingram	Chancellor of the Duchy of Lancaster; 1672–1682	Succeeded by Sir Thomas Chicheley
Baronetage of England
Preceded by Robert Carr	Baronet (of Sleaford); 1667–1682	Succeeded by Edward Carr
