= Lincolnshire (UK Parliament constituency) =

Parliamentary constituency in the United Kingdom, 1801–1832

- Former county constituency for the House of Commons

1290–1832
- Seats: Two
- Replaced by: North Lincolnshire and South Lincolnshire

Lincolnshire was a county constituency of the Parliaments of England before 1707, Great Britain before 1800 and the Parliament of the United Kingdom, which returned two Members of Parliament (MPs) to the House of Commons from 1290 until 1832.

== History ==
The constituency consisted of the historic county of Lincolnshire, excluding the city of Lincoln which had the status of a county in itself after 1409. (Although Lincolnshire contained four other boroughs, Boston, Grantham, Great Grimsby and Stamford, each of which elected two MPs in its own right for part of the period when Lincolnshire was a constituency, these were not excluded from the county constituency, and owning property within the borough could confer a vote at the county election. This was not the case, though, for Lincoln.)

As in other county constituencies the franchise between 1430 and 1832 was defined by the Forty Shilling Freeholder Act, which gave the right to vote to every man who possessed freehold property within the county valued at £2 or more per year for the purposes of land tax; it was not necessary for the freeholder to occupy his land, nor even in later years to be resident in the county at all.

Except during the period of the Commonwealth, Lincolnshire had two MPs, traditionally referred to as Knights of the Shire, elected by the bloc vote method, under which each voter had two votes. In the nominated Barebones Parliament, five members represented Lincolnshire. In the First and Second Parliaments of Oliver Cromwell's Protectorate, however, there was a general redistribution of seats and Lincolnshire elected ten members, while each of the boroughs apart from Lincoln had their representation reduced to a single MP. The traditional arrangements were restored from 1659.

At the time of the Great Reform Act in 1832, Lincolnshire had a population of approximately 317,000, though only 5,391 electors voted at the last contested election, a by-election in 1823.

Elections were held at a single polling place, Lincoln, and voters from the rest of the county had to travel to the county town to exercise their franchise. It was normal for voters to expect the candidates for whom they voted to meet their expenses in travelling to the poll, making the cost of a contested election substantial. Contested elections were therefore rare, potential candidates preferring to canvass support beforehand and usually not insisting on a vote being taken unless they were confident of winning; at all but 4 of the 29 general elections between 1701 and 1832, Lincolnshire's two MPs were elected unopposed.

The constituency was abolished in 1832 by the Great Reform Act, being divided into two two-member county divisions, Northern Lincolnshire (or The Parts of Lindsey) and Southern Lincolnshire (or The Parts of Kesteven and Holland).

== Members of Parliament ==
=== MPs 1290–1640 ===
| Year | First member | Second member |
|---|---|---|
| 1290 | John Dyne | John de Hoyland |
| 1295 | Ranulph de Otteby | Ralph de Littlebury |
| 1297 | Simon fitz Ralph | Richard de Huwell |
| 1298 | William Disney | Sir John Marmion |
| 1300 | Thomas de Burnham | Thomas fitz Eustace |
| 1301 | Thomas fitz Eustace | Thomas de Burnham |
| 1302 | Thomas de Burnham | Simon fitz Ralph of Ormesby |
| 1305 | Henry de Bayeaux | Thomas de Burnham |
| 1306 | Ranulph de Friskney | John de Neville of Stoke |
| 1307 (Jan) | Ranulph de Friskney | William de Alta Ripa |
| 1307 (Oct) | Simon fitz Ralph | Ranulph de Friskney |
| 1309 | Henry de Bayeaux | Thomas de Burnham |
| 1311 (Aug) | Simon fitz Ralph | William Disney |
| 1311 (Nov) | William Disney | Simon de Lunderthorp |
| 1313 (Mar) | Henry de Bayeaux | John de Neville |
| 1313 | Laurence de Holbech | William de Helewell |
| 1314 | Laurence de Holbech | William de Helewell |
| 1315 | Thomas de Tittele | William de Paris |
| 1316 (Jan) | Roger de Cubbeldyk | Simon le Chamberlain |
| 1316 (Jul) | Richard de Buslingthorpe | William Disney |
| 1318 | Laurence de Holbech | William Disney |
| 1319 | Robert Darcy | John Darcy (le Frere) |
| 1320 | Henry de Bayeaux | Simon de Berford |
| 1321 | William de Paris | Walter de Trikingham |
| 1322 (May) | Thomas de Newmarch | Simon le Chamberlain |
| 1322 (Nov) | Richard Byron | William de Paris |
| 1324 (Feb) | John Darcy (le Frere) | William Disney |
| 1324 (Oct) | Sir William de Wasteneys | John de Trehampton, sergeant |
| 1325 | Thomas de Willoughby | John de Yordeburgh |
| 1327 (Jan) | William de Bayeaux | John de Barkeworth |
| 1327 (Sep) | Thomas de Newmarch | Norman Darcy |
| 1328 (Feb) | Simon de Kynardesleye | Thomas de Newmarch |
| 1328 (Apr) | Simon de Kynardesleye | Thomas de Newmarch |
| 1328 (Jul) | Simon de Kynardesleye | John Torny |
| 1329 | Simon de Kynardesleye | John Torny |
| 1330 (Mar) | Thomas de Newmarch | John de Trehampton |
| 1330 (Nov) | John de Trehampton | Thomas de Carleton |
| 1331 | Thomas de Willoughby | John de Barkeworth |
| 1332 (Mar) | William de Trikingham | John de Trehampton |
| 1332 (Sep) | Thomas de Newmarch | William de Lunderthorp |
| 1333 | John de Trehampton | Thomas de Carleton |
| 1334 (Feb) | Ralph de St. Lo | John de Trehampton |
| 1334 (Sep) | John de Trehampton | Gilbert de Ledred |
| 1335 | Philip de Nevill, jnr. | Richard de Waldegrave |
| 1336 (Mar) | Norman Darcy | John Darcy |
| 1336 (Sep) | Norman Darcy | John Deyncourt |
| 1337 (Mar) | Thomas Lovelaunce | Ranulph de Paris |
| 1337 (Sep) | Walter de Trikingham | Richard Byron |
| 1338 (Feb) | Thomas de Willoughby | Henry de Killingholme |
| 1338 (Jul) | Gilbert de Ledred | Thomas Lovelaunce |
| 1339 (Feb) | Sir Walter de Trikingham | Sir John Torny |
| 1339 (Oct) | John Torny | Thomas Lovelaunce |
| 1340 (Jan) | John Torny | |
| 1340 (Mar) | Sir John Torny | Sir Walter de Trikingham |
| 1341 | Sir William de Bayeaux | Sir William de Friskney |
| 1343 | Saierus de Rochford | John de Bayeaux |
| 1344 | Thomas de Roos of Dowesby | Thomas Lovelaunce |
| 1346 | Walter de Trikingham | John Bernack |
| 1348 (Jan) | Sir Walter de Trikingham | Thomas Lovelaunce |
| 1348 (Mar) | Sir John de Trehampton | Sir John de Gaunt |
| 1351 | Sir William de Belesby | Sir William de Toutheby |
| 1352 | Edmund de Cornewaill | Thomas de Swynford |
| 1353 | Nicholas de Ry | |
| 1354 | Norman de Swynford | William de Colvill |
| 1355 | John de Boys | William Hauley |
| 1357 | Sir William Marmion | Thomas de Fulnetby |
| 1358 | Sir Thomas de Bernardeston | Sir Thomas de Fulnetby |
| 1360 | Edmund de Cornewaill | Thomas de Swynford |
| 1361 | Sir Thomas de Fulnetby | Sir Laurence de Flete |
| 1362 | Sir Thomas de Fulnetby | Sir Laurence de Flete |
| 1363 | Sir Thomas de Fulnetby | Sir Laurence de Flete |
| 1365 | Sir William de Belesby | Sir William Marmion |
| 1366 | Sir Thomas de Fulnetby | William Hauley, Snr. |
| 1368 | Sir Thomas de Fulnetby | William Bussy |
| 1369 | Edmund de Cornewaill | Thomas de Fulnetby |
| 1371 | Robert Hauley | |
| 1372 | John Dymoke | Sir William Marmion |
| 1373 | Sir John Dymoke | Sir John de Multon |
| 1376 | Sir Thomas de Kydale | Sir William Bussy |
| 1377 (Jan) | John de Rochford | John Auncell |
| 1377 (Oct) | Sir John Dymoke | Sir John Auncell |
| 1378 | Sir William Bussy | Sir John Auncell |
| 1379 | Ralph Rochford | John Auncell |
| 1380 (Jan) | Sir William Bussy | John de Boys |
| 1380 (Nov) | William Spaigne | |
| 1381 | Sir John de Toutheby | Sir Robert de Leek |
| 1382 (May) | John de Toutheby | William Airmyn |
| 1382 (Oct) | Robert de Leek | William Spaigne |
| 1383 (Feb) | Sir John Bozoun | Walter Tailboys |
| 1383 (Oct) | John de Multon | John Bussy |
| 1384 (Apr) | Sir John de Multon | Sir John Bozoun |
| 1384 (Nov) | Sir John Bozoun | Sir Robert de Leek |
| 1385 | Sir Philip de Tilney | Sir William Airmyn |
| 1386 | Sir John Bozoun | Sir Walter Tailboys |
| 1388 (Feb) | Sir Philip Tilney | Sir Walter Tailboys |
| 1388 (Sep) | Sir Philip Tilney | Sir John Bussy |
| 1390 (Jan) | Sir Philip Tilney | Sir John Bussy |
| 1390 (Nov) | John Rochford | Sir John Bussy |
| 1391 | Gerard Sothill | Sir John Bussy |
| 1393 | Robert Cumberworth | Sir John Bussy |
| 1394 | John Rochford | Sir John Bussy |
| 1395 | Robert Cumberworth | Sir John Bussy |
| 1397 (Jan) | Sir John Copledyke | Sir John Bussy |
| 1397 (Sep) | John Rochford | Sir John Bussy |
| 1397 | Philip Spencer | |
| 1399 | John Rochford | Sir Thomas Hawley |
| 1401 | Sir Henry de Retford | Sir John Copildyke |
| 1402 | Sir Henry de Retford | (Sir) Gerard Sothill |
| 1404 (Jan) | Sir Richard Hansard | Sir John Copildyke |
| 1404 (Oct) | Sir Henry de Retford | Sir Thomas Hawley |
| 1406 | John Skipwith | Sir John Copildyke |
| 1407 | John Skipwith | John Meres |
| 1410 | | |
| 1411 | Sir Thomas Willoughby | John Pouger |
| 1413 (Feb) | | |
| 1413 (May) | Sir Richard Hansard | John Bell |
| 1414 (Apr) | John Skipwith | Thomas Cumberworth |
| 1414 (Nov) | Sir Richard Hansard | Sir Thomas Willoughby |
| 1415 | | |
| 1416 (Mar) | Sir Robert Hilton | William Tirwhit |
| 1416 | Geoffrey Paynel | |
| 1416 (Oct) | | |
| 1417 | | |
| 1419 | | |
| 1420 | Sir Robert Hakebeche | Sir Thomas Cumberworth |
| 1421 (May) | Sir Richard Hansard | Sir Godfrey Hilton |
| 1421 (Dec) | Richard Welby | Sir Thomas Cumberworth |
| 1423 | Sir Richard Hansard | William Tyrwhit |
| 1425 | Sir Thomas Cumberworth | |
| 1426 | William Tyrwhit | |
| 1431 | Hamond Sutton | |
| 1435 | Hamond Sutton | |
| 1432 | Geoffrey Paynel | |
| 1437 | Sir Thomas Cumberworth | |
| 1439 | Hamond Sutton | |
| 1445 | William Tailboys | |
| 1447 | John Byron | Sir Manser Marmion |
| 1488 | Sir Thomas Fitzwilliam | |
| 1491 | Sir William Tyrwhitt | |
| 1510 | | |
| 1512 | ?Sir Robert Sheffield | ? |
| 1515 | ?Sir Robert Sheffield | ?John Hussey, 1st Baron Hussey of Sleaford |
| 1523 | John Hussey, 1st Baron Hussey of Sleaford | ? |
| 1529 | John Hussey, 1st Baron Hussey of Sleaford | Gilbert Tailboys |
| 1536 | | |
| 1539 | Sir William Skipwith | John Heneage |
| 1542 | | |
| 1545 | Sir Robert Tyrwhitt I | Sir William Willoughby |
| 1547 | Sir Edward Dymoke | Sir William Skipwith |
| 1553 (Mar) | ?Sir William Cecil | Sir Robert Tyrwhitt II |
| 1553 (Oct) | William Dalison | Thomas Hussey |
| 1554 (Apr) | Sir Edward Dymoke | Sir Robert Tyrwhitt II |
| 1554 (Nov) | Sir John Copledyke | Philip Tyrwhitt |
| 1555 | Sir William Cecil | George St. Poll |
| 1558 | Sir Edward Dymoke | Sir Robert Tyrwhitt II |
| 1559 (Jan) | Sir William Cecil | Sir Richard Thymbleby |
| 1562–1563 | Sir William Cecil | Richard Bertie |
| 1563 | Sir Thomas Heneage | |
| 1571 | Sir Henry Clinton | Sir Thomas Heneage |
| 1572 | Sir Thomas Heneage | Thomas St Poll |
| 1584 (Nov) | Sir Thomas Cecil | Sir Edward Dymoke |
| 1586 (Oct) | Sir Thomas Cecil | Sir Edward Dymoke |
| 1588–1589 | Sir Edward Dymoke | George St. Poll |
| 1593 | Sir Edward Dymoke | George St. Poll |
| 1597 (Oct) | Thomas Monson | William Pelham |
| 1601 (Oct) | John Sheffield | William Wray |
| 1604 | John Sheffield | Thomas Clinton, Lord Clinton |
| 1610 | John Sheffield | Sir Valentine Browne |
| 1614 | Sir George Manners | Sir Peregrine Bertie |
| 1621 | Sir George Manners | Sir Thomas Grantham |
| 1624 | Montagu Bertie | Sir Thomas Grantham |
| 1625 | Sir John Wray, 2nd Baronet | Sir Nicholas Saunderson Bt |
| 1626 | John Monson | Sir William Airmine |
| 1628–1629 | Sir John Wray, 2nd Baronet | Sir William Airmine |
| 1629–1640 | No Parliaments summoned | |

=== MPs 1640–1832 ===
| Election | First member | First party | Second member | Second party |
|---|---|---|---|---|
| April 1640 | Sir John Wray | Parliamentarian | Sir Edward Hussey | |
| November 1640 | Sir John Wray | Parliamentarian | Sir Edward Ayscough | Parliamentarian |
| December 1648 | Wray and Ayscough excluded in Pride's Purge – both seats vacant | | | |
| 1653 | Lincolnshire was represented by five MPs in the Barebones Parliament: Sir William Brownlow, Richard Cust, Barnaby Bowtel, Humphrey Walcot, William Thompson | | | |
| 1654 | Lincolnshire was represented by ten MPs in the First Protectorate Parliament: Edward Rossiter, Thomas Hall, Thomas Lister, Charles Hall, Captain Francis Fiennes, (Sir) John Wray, Colonel Thomas Hatcher, William Woolley, William Savile, William Welby | | | |
| 1656 | Lincolnshire was represented by ten MPs in the Second Protectorate Parliament: Edward Rossiter, Thomas Hall, Thomas Lister, Charles Hall, Captain Francis Fiennes, Colonel Thomas Hatcher, William Woolley, William Savile, William Welby, Sir Charles Hussey | | | |
| January 1659 | Edward Rossiter | | Colonel Thomas Hatcher | |
| May 1659 | Not represented in the restored Rump | | | |
| 1660 | Edward Rossiter | | George Saunderson, Viscount Castleton | |
| Apr 1661 | Sir Charles Hussey, 1st Bt. | | George Saunderson, Viscount Castleton | |
| Jan 1665 | Sir Robert Carr, 3rd Baronet | | George Saunderson, Viscount Castleton | |
| Mar 1685 | Sir Thomas Hussey, 2nd Bt. | | George Saunderson, Viscount Castleton | |
| Aug 1698 | Charles Dymoke | | George Whichcot | |
| Jan 1701 | Charles Dymoke | | Sir John Thorold, 4th Bt. | |
| Feb 1703 | Lewis Dymoke | | Sir John Thorold, 4th Bt. | |
| May 1705 | George Whichcot | | Albemarle Bertie | |
| May 1708 | George Whichcot | | Peregrine Bertie, Baron Willoughby de Eresby | |
| Oct 1710 | Lewis Dymoke | | Peregrine Bertie, Baron Willoughby de Eresby | |
| Sep 1713 | Sir Willoughby Hickman, 3rd Bt. | | Peregrine Bertie, Baron Willoughby de Eresby | |
| Feb 1715 | Sir Willoughby Hickman, 3rd Bt. | | Sir John Brownlow, Bt. | |
| Jan 1721 | Sir William Massingberd, 3rd Bt. | | Sir John Brownlow, Bt. | |
| Apr 1722 | Sir William Massingberd, 3rd Bt. | | Henry Heron | |
| Feb 1724 | Robert Vyner | | Henry Heron | |
| Aug 1727 | Robert Vyner | | Sir Thomas Lumley Saunderson | |
| Feb 1740 | Robert Vyner | | Thomas Whichcot | |
| Apr 1761 | Lord Brownlow Bertie | | Thomas Whichcot | |
| Oct 1774 | Lord Brownlow Bertie | | Charles Anderson-Pelham | |
| Dec 1779 | Sir John Thorold, 9th Bt. | | Charles Anderson-Pelham | |
| Sep 1794 | Sir John Thorold, 9th Bt. | | Robert Vyner | |
| Jun 1796 | Sir Gilbert Heathcote, Bt. | | Robert Vyner | |
| Jul 1802 | Sir Gilbert Heathcote, Bt. | | Charles Chaplin | |
| May 1807 | Charles Anderson-Pelham | | Charles Chaplin | |
| Oct 1816 | Charles Anderson-Pelham | | William Cust | |
| Jun 1818 | Charles Anderson-Pelham | | Charles Chaplin | |
| Dec 1823 | Sir William Amcotts-Ingilby, Bt. | | Charles Chaplin | |
| May 1831 | Sir William Amcotts-Ingilby, Bt. | | Charles Anderson Worsley Pelham | |
| 1832 | Great Reform Act: constituency abolished | | | |

== Election results ==
June 1818

- Hon. C. A. Pelham 3693 votes
- Sir Robert Heron 2623 votes
- Charles Chaplin Esq. 3069 votes
- Pelham and Chaplin elected. Total number of freeholders polled 5598.
