= John Hatcher (commissioner) =

Member of the Parliament of England

John Hatcher (1634–1678) was a magistrate and commissioner of several kinds in Lincolnshire, England, who also sat in the Convention Parliament from April to December of 1660. He was Sheriff of Lincolnshire for 1676.

Hatcher was the only son of Thomas Hatcher and was a presbyterian, like his father. He was commissioner for sewers for Lincolnshire in 1659, commissioner for assessment in January 1660, and commissioner for militia for Lincolnshire in March 1660. He was a J.P. for Kesteven, Lincolnshire from March 1660 to 1676. In April 1660, he was elected as one of the two Members of Parliament for Stamford. He was captain of militia horse in Lincolnshire in April 1660. In August 1660, he was commissioner for sewers for Lincolnshire and commissioner for assessment for Kesteven until 1661. He was commissioner for assessment for Lincolnshire from 1661 to 1663, for Kesteven from 1663 to 1664 and for Lincolnshire again from 1664 to his death. He was commissioner for recusants in 1675. From 1676 to 1677 he was Sheriff of Lincolnshire. He succeeded his father in 1677.

Hatcher died at the age of about 34 and was buried on 1 January 1679 at Careby.

Hatcher married Elizabeth Anderson, daughter of Sir Richard Anderson of Pendley, Hertfordshire on 8 April 1656 and had four sons and four daughters.

Parliament of England
Preceded by Not represented in Restored Rump	Member of Parliament for Stamford; 1660; With: Francis Wingfield	Succeeded by William Stafford; William Montagu
