= Thomas Crouch =

English academic and politician

Thomas Crouch (1607 – August 1679) was an English academic and politician who sat in the House of Commons from 1660 to 1679.

Crouch was the son of Thomas Crouch of Letchworth, Hertfordshire and was baptised in St Bartholomew's Church Layston on 18 October 1607. He was educated at Eton College and was admitted as a scholar to King's College, Cambridge on 26 June 1626. He was awarded BA in 1630 and MA in 1633. He was a Fellow of King's College from 1629 to 1650, when he was ejected. In 1643, he was proctor, and held the post again from 1649 to 1650. He migrated to Trinity Hall, Cambridge where he resided as Fellow.

In 1660, Crouch was elected Member of Parliament for Cambridge University in the Convention Parliament. he was re-elected in 1661 for the Cavalier Parliament and sat until 1679.

Crouch died at the age of 71 and was buried on 30 August 1679 in King's College Chapel where there is a monument. This reads in Latin

Aperiet Deus tumulos; et educet
Nos de sepulchris.
Qualis eram, dies isthaec cum
Venerit, scies.

(God will open up the graves, and lead us from our sepulchres. What manner of man I was, you will know, when that day comes)

Parliament of England
Preceded by Not represented in Restored Rump	Member of Parliament for Cambridge University; 1660–1679; With: George Monck 1660; William Montagu 1660; Sir Richard Fanshawe, 1st Baronet 1661–1666; Charles Wheler 1667–1679	Succeeded by Sir Thomas Exton; James Vernon
