= William de Paris =

Member of the Parliament of England

Sir William de Paris
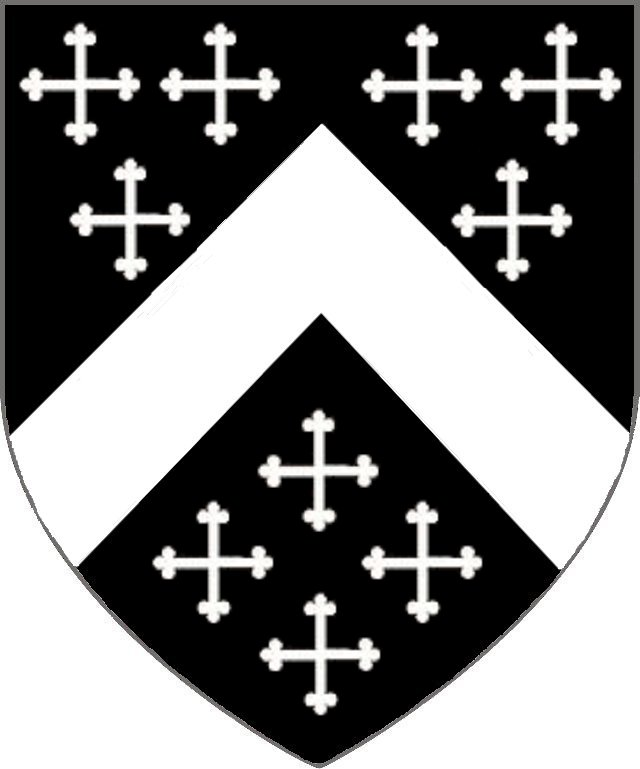
- Arms of Sir William de Paris:- sable, crusilly and a chevron argent

MP for Lincs
- In office 1315, 1321 & 1322 – 29 November 1322
- Monarch: Edward II

Sir William de Paris was a Member of Parliament for Lincolnshire and soldier of the Wars of Scottish Independence.

== Career and Life ==
William served in Edward I's invasion of Scotland of 1303 and a year later was rewarded for his service with a pardon for the murder of William de Haceby.

On 8 January 1310 William was accused of being in a gang that hunted deer illegally on Sir Thomas Ludlow's land at Scrivelsby and assaulted his servants. Ludlow retaliated by gathering up a band of men and robbing and maiming William at Morton by Horncastle, Lincolnshire. A warrant for their arrests was issued on 18 March 1310.

On 16 October 1313 William was pardoned for his role in the death of Piers Gaveston.

de Paris was summoned to defend the north against the Scots on 30 June 1314 shortly after the Battle of Bannockburn.

He attended Parliament at Westminster as a Knight of the Shire for Lincolnshire on 25 January 1315.

In 1320 William was accused of breaking the parks, with others, of Humphrey de Waleden at Stanford Rivers, Essex.

In 1321 discontent was once more brewing among the barons and William attended the meeting in Westminster known as the "Parliament of White Bands" in which the lords defied the king by wearing martial dress and ignoring the king. This culminated in the Battle of Boroughbridge in 1322 at which William de Paris fought on the king's side.

He attended Parliament at York as a Knight of the Shire for Lincolnshire on 14 November 1322 but by 1324 was "so ill that his life was despaired of" and did not attend again.

In 1326 the corrupt and unpopular judge Roger Beler was murdered by Eustace Folville and his Gang. On 1 March 1326 a warrant for the arrest of the gang was issued to William de Paris and others. The only member of the gang to ever be punished was Eustace's brother the Rev. Richard Folville, Vicar of Teigh.

In April 1327 de Paris sued John Marmion, 4th Baron Marmion of Winteringham for the wardship of William, the underage son and heir of the late Leicestershire MP and knight Sir William Marmion (a leading candidate to be the Knight of Norham Castle fame) and his land at Keisby, Lincs. William Marmion is not known to have been a tenant of de Paris so the legitimacy of this claim is dubious. (Note: Fraud and forgery were rife in Lincolnshire until the mid C16th.)

During William De Paris' life he was described as being of Morton by Horncastle but his family also held land at Great Humby and Old Somerby.

== Bibliography ==
- Foster, Joseph (1902). Some Feudal Coats of Arms. London: J.Parker & Co.
- Moor, Charles (1931). The Knights of Edward I. London: Harleian Society.
- Close Rolls. Westminster: Parliament of England. 1224–1468.
- Fine Rolls. Westminster: Parliament of England. 1199–1461.
- Patent Rolls. Westminster: Parliament of England. 1232–1509.
- Lists and Indexes, No. XXXII. (In Two Parts). Index of Placita De Banco, preserved in the Public Record Office. A.D. 1327-1328. Vol. I. London: Public Record Office. 1909.
- Parliamentary Writs. Vol. I. London: Public Record Office. 1827.
- Parliamentary Writs. Vol. II. London: Public Record Office. 1830.
