= Earl Castleton =

Earldom in the Peerage of Great Britain

Earldom of Castleton
- Paly of six, argent and azure, a bend, sable, three annulets or
- Creation date: 18 June 1720
- Created by: George I
- Peerage: Peerage of Great Britain
- First holder: James Saunderson, 6th Viscount Castleton
- Last holder: James Saunderson, 1st Earl
- Remainder to: Heirs male of the first earl's body lawfully begotton
- Subsidiary titles: Viscount Castleton (GB, 1716); Viscount Castleton (Ire, 1627); Baron Saunderson (GB, 1714); Baron Saunderson (Ire, 1627); Baronet (of Saxby)
- Status: Extinct
- Extinction date: 23 May 1723
- Seats: Sandbeck Park; Castle Saunderson
- Motto: Je suis veillant à plaire ("I am watchful to please") or Sans Dieu rien ("Without God, nothing")

The title Earl Castleton, of Sandbeck in the County of York, was created in the Peerage of Great Britain in 1720 for the 6th Viscount Castleton, who had previously been created Baron Saunderson, of Saxby in the County of Lincoln, in 1714, and Viscount Castleton, of Sandbeck in the County of York, in 1716, both also in the Peerage of Great Britain.

The title Viscount Castleton, in the County of Limerick, had been created in the Peerage of Ireland in 1627, along with the subsidiary title Baron Saunderson, of Bantry in the County of Cork, for Sir Nicholas Saunderson, 1st Baronet, who had been created a Baronet, styled "of Saxby in the County of Lincoln", in the Baronetage of England, in 1611.

All of the titles became extinct on the death of the 1st Earl in 1723. His estates passed to his cousin Lieutenant-Colonel Thomas Lumley, who thereupon took the additional surname of Saunderson by Act of Parliament and subsequently succeeded as 3rd Earl of Scarbrough.

== Saunderson Baronets (1611) ==
- Sir Nicholas Saunderson, 1st Baronet (1561–1630) (created Viscount Castleton in 1627)

== Viscounts Castleton (1627) ==
- Nicholas Saunderson, 1st Viscount Castleton (1561–1630)
- Nicholas Saunderson, 2nd Viscount Castleton (d. 1640)
- Nicholas Saunderson, 3rd Viscount Castleton (1625–1641)
- Peregrine Saunderson, 4th Viscount Castleton (1628–1650)
- George Saunderson, 5th Viscount Castleton (1631–1714)
- James Saunderson, 6th Viscount Castleton (1667–1723) (created Earl Castleton in 1720)

== Earls Castleton (1720) ==
- James Saunderson, 1st Earl Castleton (1667–1723)

Baronetage of England
Preceded by Essex Baronets	Saunderson Baronets; 25 November 1611	Succeeded by Gostwick Baronets
