= Baptist Noel, 3rd Earl of Gainsborough =

English peer and Member of Parliament

The Right Honourable The Earl of Gainsborough
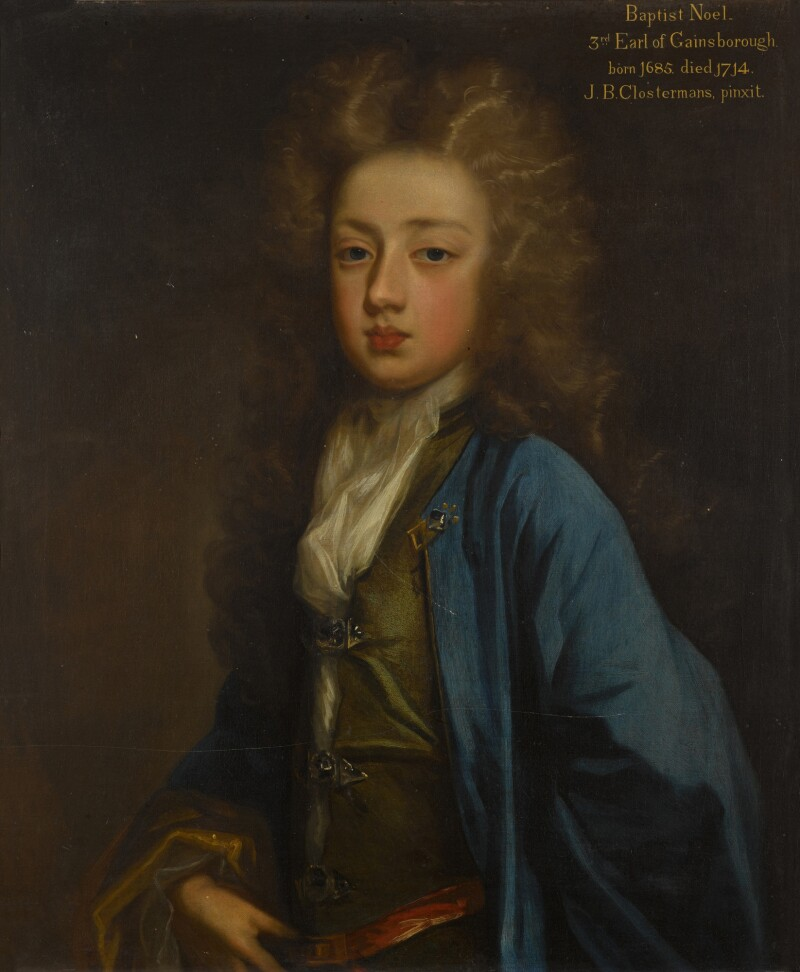
- Portrait of Baptist Noel, 3rd Earl of Gainsborough, when a boy (by John Baptist Closterman)

Personal details
- Born: 1684
- Died: 17 April 1714 (aged 29–30)
- Spouse: Lady Dorothy Manners
- Parent(s): Baptist Noel; Susannah Fanshawe
- Relatives: Wriothesley Noel, 2nd Earl of Gainsborough (cousin)
- Occupation: Aristocrat

Baptist Noel, 3rd Earl of Gainsborough (1684 – 17 April 1714) was an English peer and Member of Parliament.

== Early life ==
Baptist Noel was born in 1684. He was the son of Baptist Noel and a cousin to Wriothesley Noel, 2nd Earl of Gainsborough.

== Career ==
Noel inherited the earldom from his cousin in 1690. He served as the High Steward of Chipping Campden.

== Personal life ==
Noel married his first cousin Lady Dorothy Manners, daughter of Catherine Wriothesley Noel (daughter of Baptist Noel, 3rd Viscount Campden) and John Manners, 1st Duke of Rutland. They had three sons and three daughters:

- Baptist Noel, 4th Earl of Gainsborough (1708-1751)
- John Noel (died 1718)
- James Noel (died 1752), MP for the county of Rutland, who died unmarried
- Lady Susan(nah) Noel (1710-1758), who married Anthony Ashley-Cooper, 4th Earl of Shaftesbury, and had no children
- Lady Catherine Noel, who died unmarried
- Lady Mary Noel (died 1718)

== Death and legacy ==
The earl died of smallpox, aged 29, on 17 April 1714, and was succeeded by his eldest son.

Peerage of England
Preceded by Wriothesley Noel	Earl of Gainsborough; 1690–1714	Succeeded by Baptist Noel
