= Christopher Clapham =

17th-century English politician

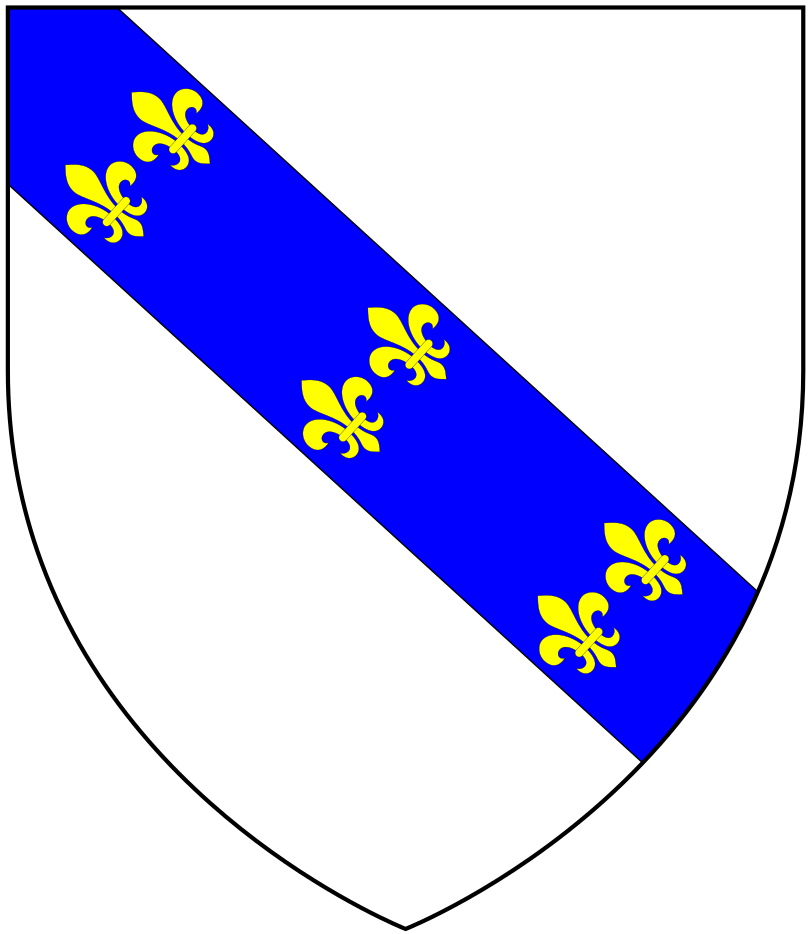
Arms of Clapham: Argent, on a bend azure six fleurs-de-lys or, two, two and two

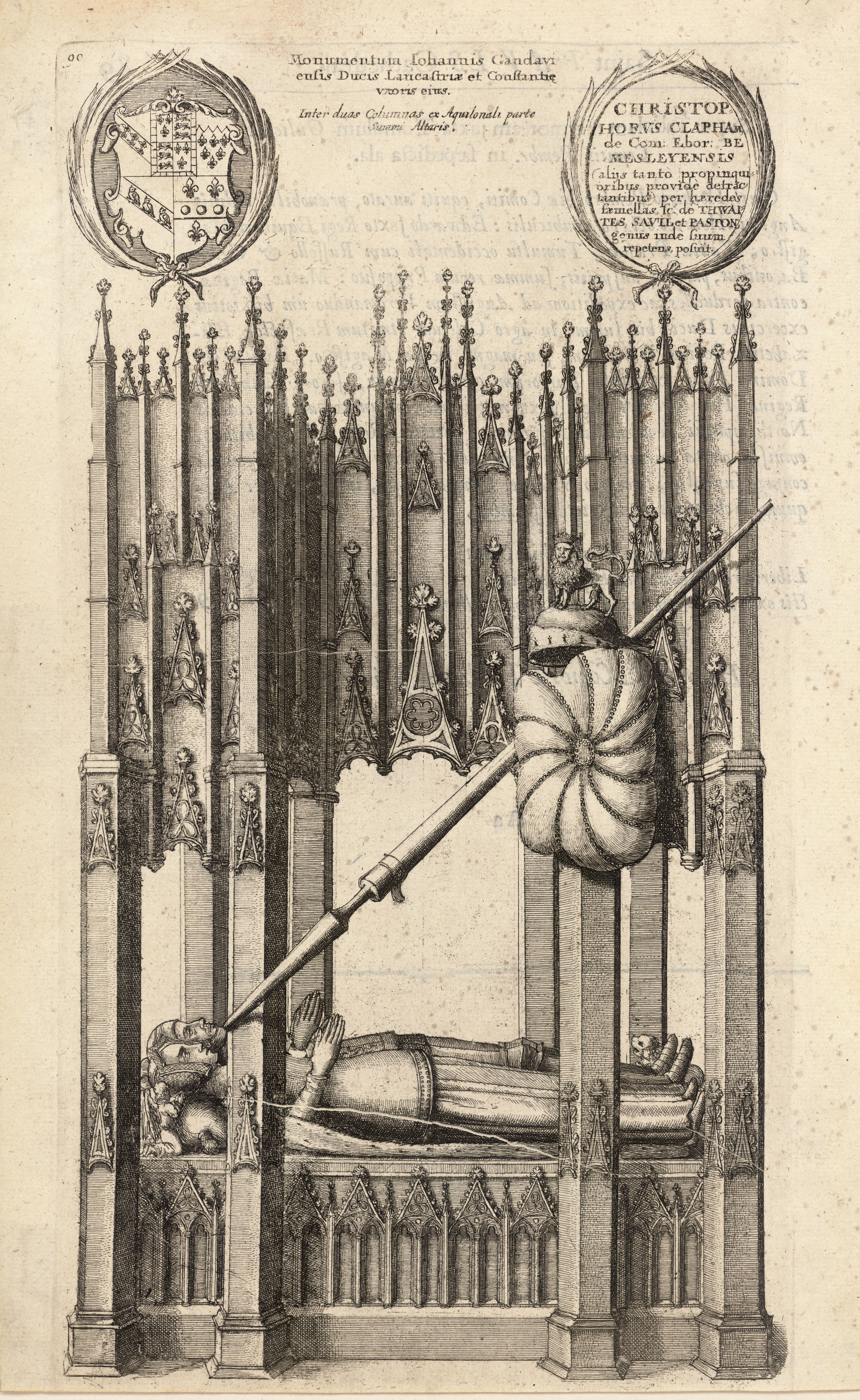
Drawing by Wenceslaus Hollar (1607–1677) of monument to John of Gaunt in Old St Paul's Cathedral, dedicated to Christopher Clapham and displaying his arms with five quarters. In the second quarter are the arms of Beaufort, suggesting his descent from John of Gaunt

Christopher Clapham (c. 1608 – 1686) of Beamsley near Skipton in Yorkshire, England, was a politician who sat in the House of Commons in 1659 and 1660.

== Origins ==
Clapham was the eldest son of George Clapham (d.1629) of Beamsley, by his wife Martha Heber, a daughter of Reginald Heber of Marton, Yorkshire.

== Career ==
He avoided commitment in the Civil war, although three of his brothers fought for the King. In 1658 Clapham became freeman of Stamford and in 1659 was elected a member of parliament for Stamford for the Third Protectorate Parliament. In 1660 he was elected as an MP for Appleby in the Convention Parliament. He was knighted on 8 June 1660 and became a justice of the peace for the West Riding of Yorkshire in July 1660. In August 1660 he became commissioner for assessment for Westmorland and Kesteven until 1661 and commissioner for assessment for West Riding of Yorkshire until 1690. He was commissioner for oyer and terminer for Lincoln in 1661 and commissioner for assessment for Lincolnshire from 1661 to 1663. In 1663 he became captain in the horse volunteers for Lincolnshire and JP for Kesteven, Lincolnshire until his death. He was commissioner for assessment for West Riding of Yorkshire from 1665 to 1680. He was a JP for Yorkshire West Riding from 1672 until before 1680 and commissioner for recusants for West Riding in 1675. In 1681 he became deputy lieutenant for Lincolnshire until his death and was High Sheriff of Lincolnshire from 1682 to 1683. He was JP for West Riding of Yorkshire from 1685 until his death.

== Marriages and children ==
Clapham married firstly by 1627, Mary Lowden (d.1637), a daughter of John Lowden of Wrenthorpe, Yorkshire, by whom he had two sons and a daughter. Mary died on 1 August 1637 and he married secondly on 14 May 1639, Margaret Oldfield (d.1674), widow of Robert Moyle, and daughter of Anthony Oldfield, attorney, of Spalding, Lincolnshire by whom he had a further four sons and four daughters. Margaret died in 1674 and he married thirdly by licence issued on 26 April 1678, Mary Needham, daughter of Robert Needham, 2nd Viscount Kilmorey of Shavington, Shropshire.

== Death and burial ==
Clapham died at the age of 77 and was buried at St Mary's Church, Stamford on 16 August 1686.

Parliament of England
Preceded by John Weaver	Member of Parliament for Stamford; 1659; With: John Weaver	Succeeded by Not represented in Restored Rump
