= George Saunderson, 5th Viscount Castleton =

English soldier and politician

George Saunderson, 5th Viscount Castleton (12 October 1631 – 27 May 1714) was an English soldier and politician who sat in the House of Commons from 1660 to 1698.

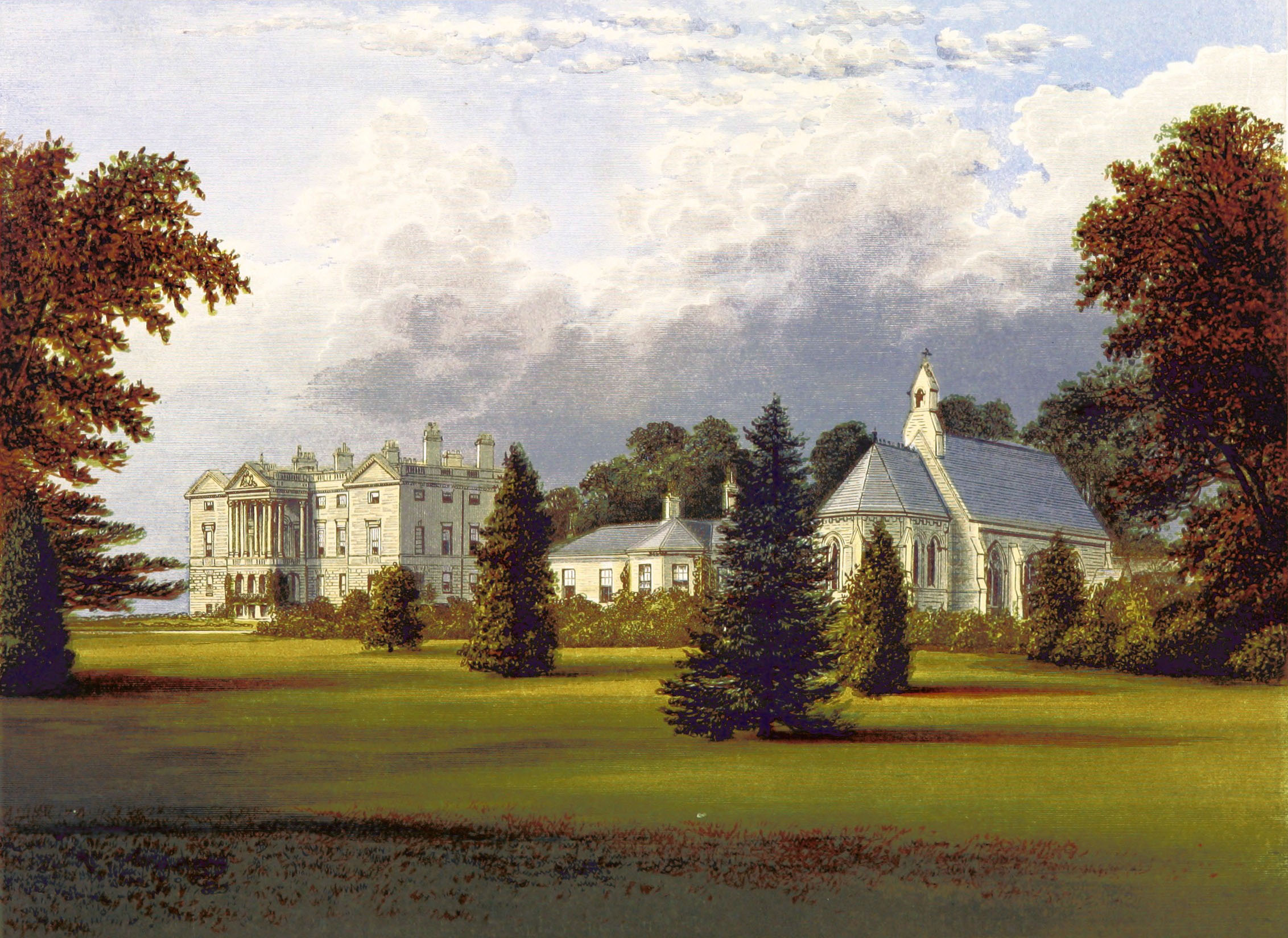
Sandbeck Park, Yorkshire

Saunderson was born in Fillingham, Lincolnshire, the son of Sir Nicholas Saunderson, 2nd Viscount Castleton and his wife Frances Manners, daughter of Sir George Manners of Haddon Hall, Derbyshire. He inherited the viscountcy in the Peerage of Ireland in 1650 on the death of his brother.

In 1660, Saunderson was elected Member of Parliament for Lincolnshire in the Convention Parliament. He was re-elected MP for Lincolnshire in 1661 for the Cavalier Parliament and held the seat until 1698. From 1689–94 he was colonel of a regiment of foot which he raised in Yorkshire and which served in Ireland and in Flanders under King William III.

Saunderson died at Sandbeck Park, South Yorkshire at the age of 82.

Saunderson first married Grace Belasyse, daughter of Henry Belasyse, and then married Lady Sarah Fanshawe, widow of both her first husband, Sir John Wray, 3rd Baronet of Glentworth, and her second husband, Lord Thomas Fanshawe, 2nd Viscount Fanshawe. She was the daughter of Sir John Evelyn of West Dean. Her father left her only five shillings in his will because he disapproved of her marriage to Lord Castleton.

Parliament of England
Preceded by Not represented in the restored Rump	Member of Parliament for Lincolnshire; 1660–1698; With: Edward Rossiter 1660–1661; Sir Charles Hussey, Bt 1661–1665; Sir Robert Carr, Bt 1665–1685; Sir Thomas Hussey, 2nd Baronet 1685–1698	Succeeded by Charles Dymoke; George Whichcot
Peerage of Ireland
Preceded by Peregrine Saunderson	Viscount Castleton; 1650–1714	Succeeded by James Saunderson
