= John Rochford =

English politician

Sir John Rochford or John de Rochford (died 1410) of Fenn of Boston, Lincolnshire, was an English politician. He was a Member (MP) of the Parliament of England for Lincolnshire November 1390, 1394, September 1397 and 1399 and for Cambridgeshire in 1407. He was knighted by 1399. He was appointed High Sheriff of Lincolnshire for 1391–92, 1400–01 and 1409–10, and Constable of Wisbech Castle, Cambridgeshire from 1401 to his death. He was married and had a son and two daughters.
