= Baptist Noel, 4th Earl of Gainsborough =

English peer and Member of Parliament

The Right Honourable The Earl of Gainsborough
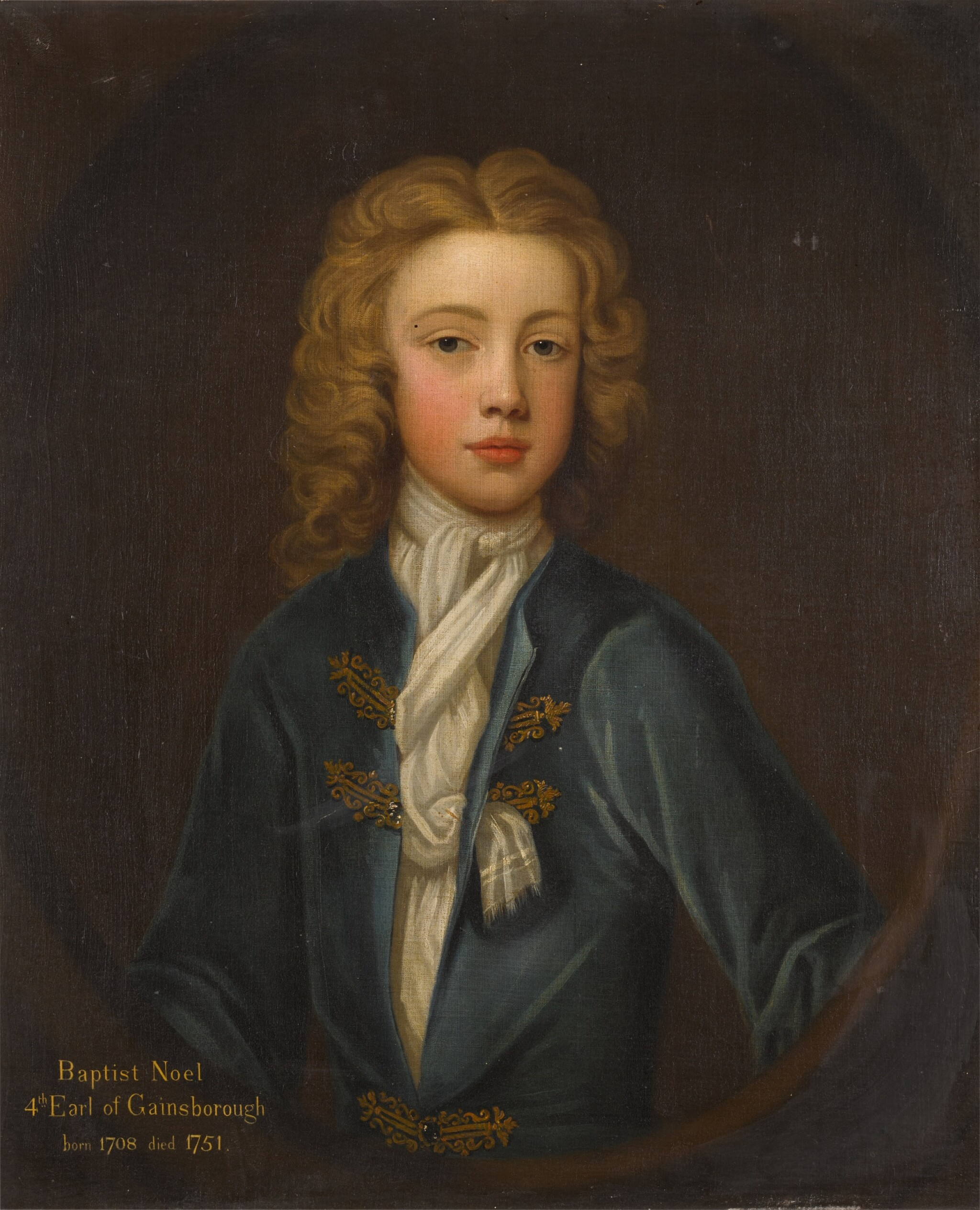
- Portrait of Baptist Noel, 4th Earl of Gainsborough (circle of Sir Godfrey Kneller)

Personal details
- Born: Baptist Noel; 1708
- Died: 21 March 1751 (aged 42–43)
- Spouse: Elizabeth Chapman (m. 1728)
- Parent(s): Baptist Noel, 3rd Earl of Gainsborough; Lady Dorothy Manners
- Relatives: John Manners, 1st Duke of Rutland (grandfather)
- Education: St John's College, Cambridge
- Occupation: Aristocrat

Baptist Noel, 4th Earl of Gainsborough (1708 – 21 March 1751) was an English peer and Member of Parliament, styled Viscount Campden until 1714.

== Early life ==
He was the son of Baptist Noel, 3rd Earl of Gainsborough and Lady Dorothy Manners, the second daughter of John Manners, 1st Duke of Rutland, by his third wife, the Hon. Catherine Noel (eldest daughter by his fourth wife of Baptist Noel, 3rd Viscount Campden). His sister, Lady Susan Noel married their second cousin, Anthony Ashley Cooper, 4th Earl of Shaftesbury.

== Career ==
In 1714, he inherited the earldom of Gainsborough upon his father's death.

Gainsborough was High Steward of Chipping Campden and was appointed Warden and Chief Ranger of Lyfield Forest in 1737.

== Personal life ==
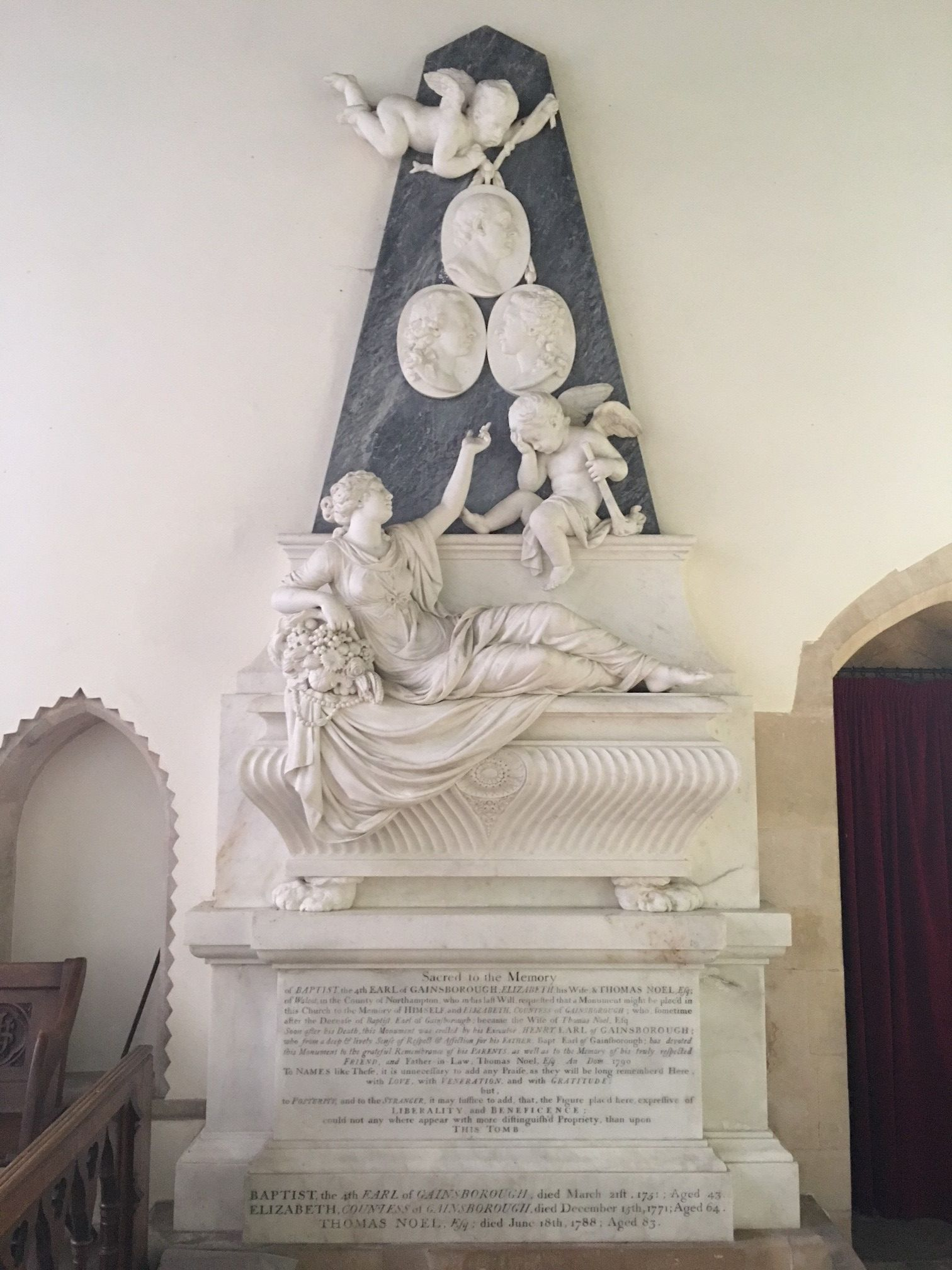
Memorial to Baptist Noel, 4th Earl of Gainsborough, in the church of St Peter & St Paul, Exton, Rutland

In 1728 he married Elizabeth Chapman. Their children were:

- Lady Lucy Noel, who married Sir Horatio Mann, 2nd Baronet, and had children
- Lady Sophia Noel, who married Christopher Nevile of Wellingore Hall and had one child.
- Lady Elizabeth Noel (1731–1801)
- Lady Jane Noel (1733–1811), who married Gerard Edwardes, an illegitimate son of Lord Anne Hamilton (the younger son of James Hamilton, 4th Duke of Hamilton), and had one child, Sir Gerard Noel, 2nd Baronet.
- Lady Juliana Noel (1734–1760), who married George Evans, 3rd Baron Carbery, and had one child, The Hon. Juliana Evans
- Baptist Noel, 5th Earl of Gainsborough (1740–1759), who died unmarried.
- Henry Noel, 6th Earl of Gainsborough (1743–1798), who died unmarried.

The earl died in his early forties, and was succeeded by his eldest son. His widow later married his cousin, Thomas Noel. On the death of the 6th Earl of Gainsborough in 1798, all his titles became extinct and his estates were inherited by his nephew Sir Gerard Noel, 2nd Baronet. In 1841 his eldest son, Sir Charles Noel, 3rd Baronet, was created Earl of Gainsborough.

Peerage of England
Preceded by Baptist Noel	Earl of Gainsborough; 1714–1751	Succeeded by Baptist Noel
