= John Digby (1668–1728) =

English politician (1668–1728)

John Digby (1668 – 3 August 1728) was an English Tory politician. He sat as MP for Newark from 1705 till 1708 and East Retford from 1713 till 1722.

== Family and education ==
He was baptised on 22 September 1668. He was the first surviving son of John Digby (died before 1697) and Frances, the daughter of Leonard Pinkney. He was educated at Jesus College, Cambridge and matriculated in 1684. He married his second wife, Jane, the daughter of Sir Thomas Wharton, and they had two sons and twelve daughters.

== Political career ==
In 1698, he voted for Gervase Eyre and Sir Thomas Willoughby, 2nd Baronet. In 1705, he was elected for Newark. On 25 October 1705, he voted against the Court (Whig) candidate for Speaker, John Smith (Chancellor of the Exchequer instead supporting the Tory candidate William Bromley. On 20 December 1705, he was granted a leave of absence due to ill health.

In 1708, he did not seek re-election. In 1710, he attempted to get re-elected to Newark but withdrew when his former ally Willoughby stood against him. He was defeated heavily by Richard Sutton in the 1711 by-election. In 1713, he was returned unopposed for East Retford. In April 1714, he was incapacitated by severe gout. In 1715, he was re-elected to East Retford and voted against the impeachements of Tory ministers after the Hanoverian Succession. He sat until 1722. In 1722, he voted for both Tory candidates in the Nottinghamshire election.

== Death ==
On 3 August 1728, he died having remained active as a justice of the peace and in the administration of Sherwood Forest.
