= Francis Wingfield =

Member of the Parliament of England

Francis Wingfield or Wingfeild (born September 1628) was a Stamford lawyer in the mid-seventeenth century. He went on to become Member of Parliament for Stamford in 1660 and first Serjeant-at-law to Charles II of England in 1677.

== Early life and family ==
Francis, born at Tickencote in September 1628, was the fourth son of Sir John Wingfield and Frances, daughter of Edward Cromwell, 3rd Baron Cromwell of Oakham. According to traditional tales, Frances Wingfield, his mother, entertained Oliver Cromwell and saved the town of Stamford from destruction, by allowing the gates to be closed.

He later became a lawyer at Gray's Inn.

He married twice, with his first wife Anne, the daughter of Edward Palmer of Stoke Doyle, he had two sons and a daughter, Frances, later the wife of Richard Butler of Hundleby.

With his second wife, Lucy Ashfield or Lucia Poultney, daughter of the Governor of York, he had two sons and three daughters, two of the daughters, Lucy (1668) and Sarah (1671) died in infancy, the third Anne (1673) married John Cock.

== 1660 election ==
The 1660 election to the Convention Parliament of 1660 was the first after the Long Parliament and the first of the English Restoration, and hence the first for some twenty years. The returning officer for Stamford could not determine the winner of the election between Wingfield, backed by the Cecils, and the incumbent John Weaver, thereby calling a double return. Eventually, Wingfield was returned for Stamford in 1660, although not without some confusion as the following two entries from journal of the House of Commons for 9 May 1660 show:

Stamford Election.

Mr. Turner reports from the Committee for Privileges and Elections, touching the double Return for the Borough of Stamford in the County of Lyncoln, that, upon Examination of the Fact, it appeared to the Committee that Francis Wingfeild is duly chosen to serve in this Parliament for the said Borough, and ought to sit.

Resolved, That this House doth agree with the Committee, that the said Mr. Wingfeild is duly chosen, and ought to sit in this House.

Stamford Return amended. The House being also informed, that the Alderman of Stamford in the County of Lincoln was at the Door; he was called in, and, being at the Bar of this House, did there amend the Return for the said Borough; and put out the Name of Mr. Weaver, and inserted the Name of Mr. Wingfeild, who was adjudged by the House to have Right to sit.

He only sat for one year.

== Barnwell House ==
In January 1662 he bought Barnwell House in Clipshill, Stamford from William Wolfe, then occupied by Elizabeth Cromwell, widow. The house was the last resting place of Charles I on his flight to Newark before surrendering himself to the Scots. At the same time he bought Hills Orchard, a half acre plot presumably as a garden to Barnwell House, from John Cecil, 4th Earl of Exeter. The house passed to his daughter Frances Butler.

== Serjeant-at-law ==
In 1677, supported by Robert Bertie, Wingfield was promoted to Serjeant-at-law.
