= William Stafford (MP) =

English politician

William Stafford (1627–1665) of Blatherwycke, Northamptonshire was an English politician.

He was born the third son of William Stafford (d.1637) of Blatherwycke and succeeded his brother in 1644.

He was elected a member (MP) of the parliament of England for Stamford on 6 April 1661, sitting until his death in 1665.

He married Margaret, the daughter of Sir John Corbet, 1st Baronet of Stoke, Shropshire and left a surviving son and 2 daughters.
