= Walter Tailboys =

English landowner, soldier, administrator and politician

Sir Walter Tailboys (c. 1350–1417) was an English landowner, soldier, administrator and politician who made his home in Lincolnshire.
