= Baptist Noel (MP) =

English politician

- Born: 2 November 1658
- Died: 28 July 1690 (aged 31); Rutland, U.K.
- Occupation: Aristocrat
- Parent(s): Baptist Noel, 3rd Viscount Campden; Elizabeth Bertie
- Relatives: Henry Noel (half-brother)

Baptist Noel (2 November 1658 – 28 July 1690) was an English politician. He was a member of parliament (MP) for Rutland.

Baptist Noel was born on 2 November 1658. He was the second surviving son of Baptist Noel, 3rd Viscount Campden and Elizabeth Bertie. He succeeded his half-brother Henry in 1677.

He was a justice of the peace (JP) for Rutland from 1685 until his death and a JP and Deputy Lieutenant for Leicestershire from 1689 to his death. He was elected a Tory knight of the shire (MP) for Rutland in March 1685.

He died aged 31 and was buried at Exton, Rutland. He had married Susannah, daughter and heiress of Sir Thomas Fanshawe of Jenkins, Barking, Essex. They had a son and three daughters. He was succeeded by his son Baptist who became the third Earl of Gainsborough.

Parliament of England
Preceded by Philip Sherard	MP for Rutland; 1685–1687	Succeeded by Bennet Sherard
