= Baptist Noel, 3rd Viscount Campden =

English Member of Parliament

The Right Honourable The Viscount Campden
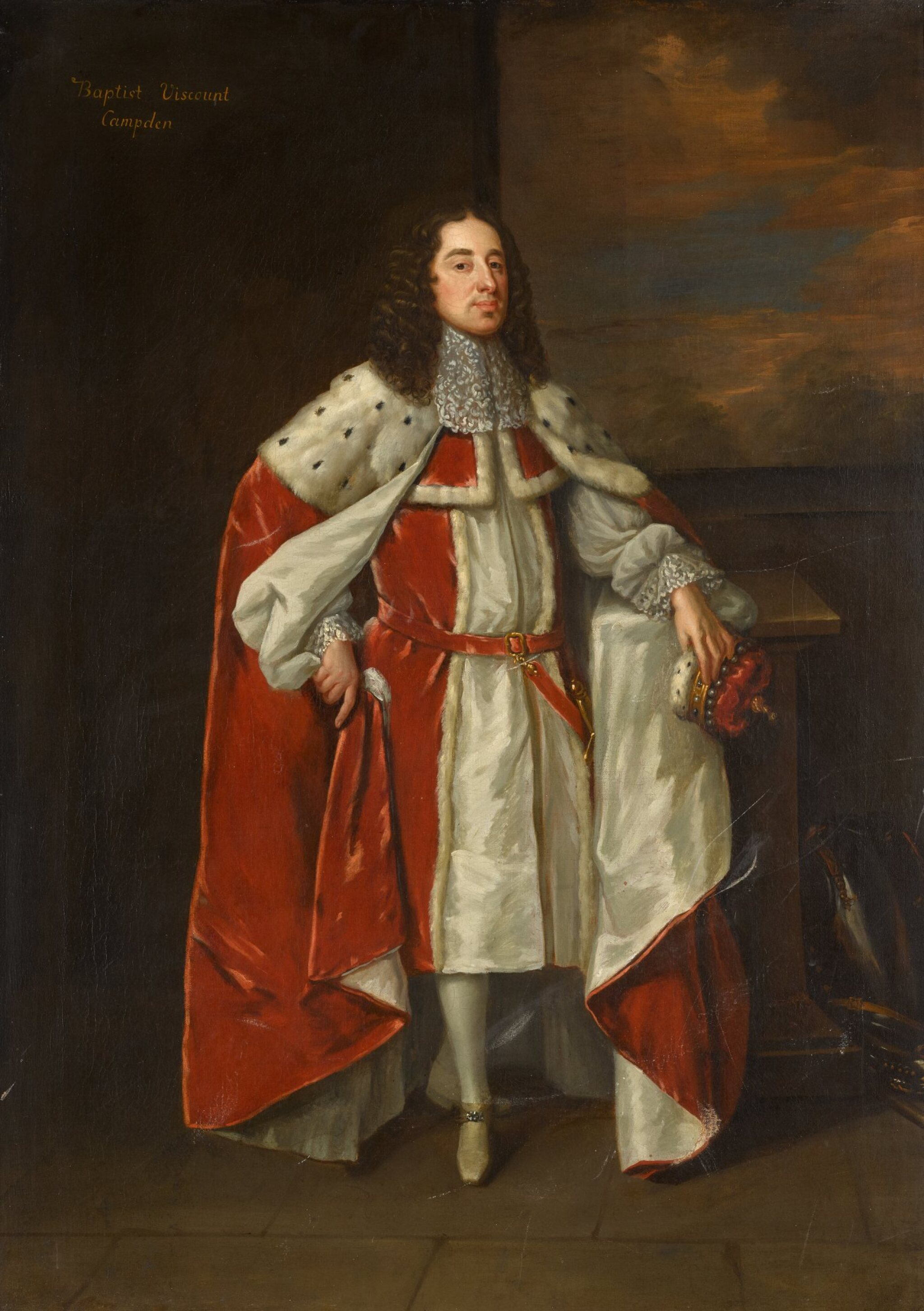
- Posthumous portrait of Baptist Noel, 3rd Viscount Campden (by J. Henesy, 1737)

Member of Parliament for Rutland
- In office 1640–1643 Serving with Sir Guy Palmes
- Preceded by: Parliament suspended since 1629
- Succeeded by: Seats vacant until 1646

Personal details
- Born: Baptist Noel; 1611 Exton, Rutland, England
- Died: 29 October 1682 (aged 70–71)
- Spouses: Lady Anne Feilding (m. 1632; died 1636) Anne Bourchier, Countess of Bath (m. 1638; died 1639) Hester Wotton (m. 1639; died 1645) Lady Elizabeth Bertie (m. 1655)
- Relations: Baptist Hicks, 1st Viscount Campden (grandfather)
- Children: 19
- Parent(s): Edward Noel, 2nd Viscount Campden; Hon. Juliana Hicks

Baptist Noel, 3rd Viscount Campden (1611 – 29 October 1682) was an English politician. He was Lord Lieutenant of Rutland, Custos Rotulorum of Rutland and the Member of Parliament for Rutland.

== Early life ==
Baptist Noel was born at Exton Hall, Rutland the son of Edward Noel, 2nd Viscount Campden and the former Hon. Juliana Hicks. His younger brother, Hon. Henry Noel, married Mary Perry. His sister, Hon. Elizabeth Noel, was the wife of John Chaworth, 2nd Viscount Chaworth, and other sister, Hon. Mary Noel, was the wife of Sir Erasmus de la Fontaine, of Kirby Ballers.

His father was the eldest son and heir of Sir Andrew Noel and Mabel Harington (sister of John Harington, 1st Baron Harington). His mother was the eldest daughter and co-heiress of Baptist Hicks, 1st Viscount Campden and Elizabeth May, sister of Sir Humphrey May, Master of the Rolls, children of Richard May, a merchant tailor of London.

== Career ==
In 1640, he was returned alongside Sir Guy Palmes as knight of the shire, (Member of Parliament) for Rutland after Parliament had been suspended since 1629. He sat in the Long Parliament.

Noel succeeded to his titles on the death of his father in 1643 and was required to leave the House of Commons. He was also Baron Noel of Ridlington and Baron Hicks of Ilmington.

During the English Civil War he was a military commander, rising to the level of brigadier-general. A supporter of King Charles, he was fined £9,000 for delinquency and Campden House, his house at Campden was destroyed.

== Personal life ==
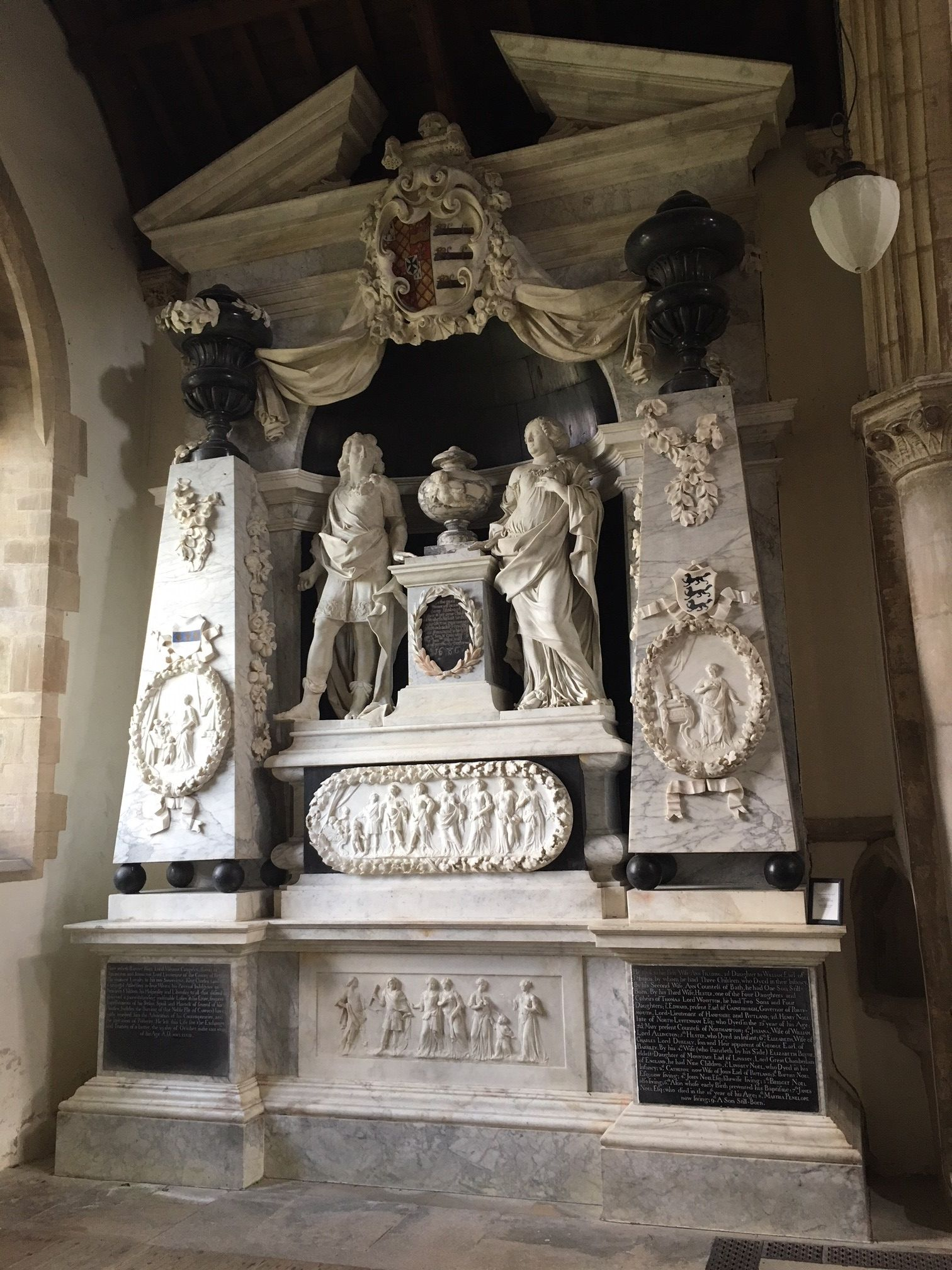
Memorial to Baptist Noel, 3rd Viscount Campden, in the church of St Peter & St Paul, Exton

Noel was married four times. His first marriage was on 25 December 1632 to Lady Anne Feilding, a daughter of Susan Feilding, Countess of Denbigh and William Feilding, 1st Earl of Denbigh. Before her death on 24 March 1636, they had three children, all of whom died young.

His second marriage was on c. June 1638 to Anne Bourchier, Countess of Bath. Ann, the widow of Edward Bourchier, 4th Earl of Bath, was a daughter of Sir Robert Lovett of Liscombe, Buckinghamshire. She died in 1639.

He married thirdly on 21 December 1639 to Hester Wotton, a daughter of Thomas Wotton, 2nd Baron Wotton. Before her death on c. 1645, they were the parents of four daughters and two sons, including:

- Hon. Mary Noel (d. 1719), who married, as his second wife, James Compton, 3rd Earl of Northampton, before 1664.
- Hon. Juliana Noel (1645–1667), who married, as his second wife, William Alington, 3rd Baron Alington, in 1664.
- Hon. Elizabeth Noel (d. 1719), who married Charles Berkeley, 2nd Earl of Berkeley, in 1677.
- Edward Noel, 1st Earl of Gainsborough
- Henry Noel, who married Elizabeth Wale, third daughter and co-heiress of Sir William Wale, Alderman of London.

His fourth, and final, marriage was on 6 July 1655 to Lady Elizabeth Bertie (1640–1683), daughter of Montagu Bertie, 2nd Earl of Lindsey. Together, they were the parents of nine children, including:

- Baptist Noel (1658–1690), who married Susannah Fanshawe, daughter and heiress of Sir Thomas Fanshawe, of Jenkins in Barking, in 1662.
- Hon. John Noel (d. 1718), who married Hon. Elizabeth Ingram, widow of Edward Ingram, 2nd Viscount Irvine, sister of Bennet Sherard, 1st Earl of Harborough, and eldest daughter of Bennet Sherard, 2nd Baron Sherard, in 1696.
- Hon. Catherine Noel (1657–1723/4), who married, as his third wife, John Manners, 1st Duke of Rutland.
- Hon. Martha Penelope Noel, who married Dormer.

Lord Campden died on 29 October 1682 and was buried in the church of St Peter and St Paul, Exton. His grave is marked by a fine marble tomb by Grinling Gibbons, dating from 1685, showing the Viscount with his fourth wife, Lady Elizabeth Bertie, and carvings of his nineteen children. He was succeeded by his eldest surviving son, Edward Noel, 1st Earl of Gainsborough.

Parliament of England
Parliament suspended since 1629	Member of Parliament for Rutland; 1640–1643; With: Sir Guy Palmes	Vacant until 1646 Title next held by James Harington; Thomas Waite
Honorary titles
English Interregnum	Lord Lieutenant of Rutland; 1661–1682	Succeeded by The Viscount Campden
English Interregnum	Custos Rotulorum of Rutland; 1661–1682	Succeeded by The Viscount Campden
Peerage of England
Preceded by Edward Noel	Viscount Campden; 1643–1682	Succeeded by Edward Noel
