= Sir Richard Cust, 1st Baronet =

Member of the English Parliament

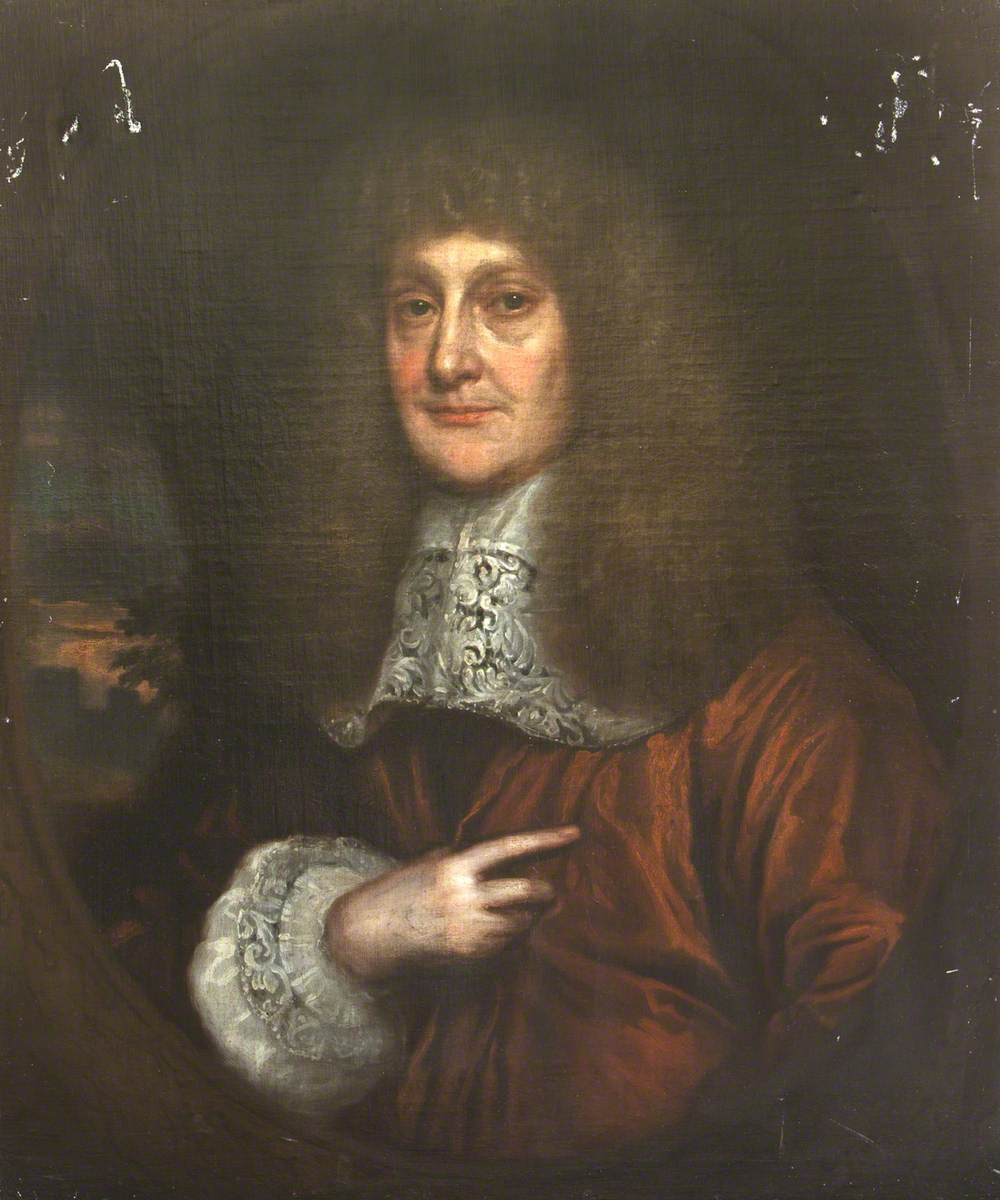

Member of the English Parliament for Lincolnshire
- In office 1653

Member of Parliament for Stamford
- In office 1679–1685

Personal details
- Spouse: Beatrice Pury

Sir Richard Cust, 1st Baronet (23 June 1622 – 30 August 1700) was an English barrister and Member of Parliament.

== Biography ==
Cust was the only son of Samuel Cust and Ann Burrell. He was edcuated at Trinity College, Cambridge, and was afterwards admitted to Inner Temple on 18 February 1640/41 to study law as a barrister. He gained the rank of Captain on 31 December 1642 in the service of the trained bands in the Roundhead army during the First English Civil War. He later became a prominent county magistrate and landowner under The Protectorate, including serving as a captain of a militia horse regiment and as a commissioner for the assessment of taxation.

He represented Lincolnshire in the House of Commons in 1653. At the Stuart Restoration in 1660, Cust sued out a pardon and then represented Stamford from 1679 to 1685. In 1677 he was created a baronet, of Stamford in the County of Lincoln. During the Exclusion Crisis, he voted with Whig efforts to exclude James, Duke of York from the throne. He was a very active member of the Exclusion Bill Parliament, sitting on 19 committees, but left no trace on the record of the Oxford Parliament of 1681. In April 1681, he was alleged to be a member of the Green Ribbon Club and his house was searched for arms during the Rye House Plot; no arms were found. In 1687 he was recorded as being among the opposition during the Loyal Parliament. Cust was an active supporter of the Glorious Revolution, but he was defeated in Stamford at the 1689 English general election.

Cust married Beatrice Pury, daughter of William Pury, on 29 August 1644. He died on 30 August 1700, aged 78, and was buried on 6 September 1700 at St George's Church, Stamford. He was succeeded by his grandson Richard Cust. The latter's son, Sir John Cust, 3rd Baronet, served as Speaker of the House of Commons from 1761 to 1770.

Parliament of England
| Preceded by Peregrine Bertie; Charles Bertie | Member of Parliament for Stamford; 1679–1685; With: William Hyde | Succeeded by Peregrine Bertie; Charles Bertie |
Baronetage of England
| New creation | Baronet (of Stamford); 1677–1700 | Succeeded by Richard Cust |
