= Thomas Lister (regicide) =

English Civil War colonel and politician

Thomas Lister (1597–1668) was colonel in the Parliamentary army during the English Civil War and an MP. He was appointed a judge at the trial of Charles I, but on the restoration escaped with a light punishment.

== Early life ==
Lister was born in 1597, the eldest son of William and Griselle Lister (née Rivett). He grew up at the family home, Coleby Hall in Lincolnshire and was admitted to Gray's Inn 1616. In 1622, he married Margaret Armine.

== Military and Parliamentary career ==
On the outbreak of the English Civil War, Lister was arrested by a party of 60 royalist troopers led by the sheriff of Lincolnshire who broke into Coleby Hall and he was taken before the King's council. After his release he rose to become a lieutenant-colonel in the parliamentary army and deputy governor of Lincoln. In 1644 he served as high sheriff of Lincolnshire and also served as a member of the parliamentarian county committee.

He was chosen as M.P. for Lincoln in 1647, replacing John Broxholme who had died. He survived Pride's Purge (the military coup that ejected from parliament MPs that did not support the army) and continued as the city's MP until 1653. He was nominated as a judge in the trial of Charles I, but only attended a few sessions of the court and did not sign the death warrant.

In February 1651, he was appointed a member of the council of state. He was MP for the county of Lincolnshire in the Protectorate Parliaments but he once again represented the city in 1659 with the recall of the Rump Parliament. At the restoration, he was excluded from the Indemnity and Oblivion Act, because of his role in the trial and execution of Charles I and was tried for regicide. He knelt at the bar of the House of Lords and pleaded "deep repentance". He escaped with a light penalty, being forbidden to hold public office from 1660.

He died at Grays Inn in 1668 and his nephew, William, inherited his property.
