= Edward Rossiter =

English Parliamentarian soldier and politician (1619–1683)

Sir Edward Rossiter
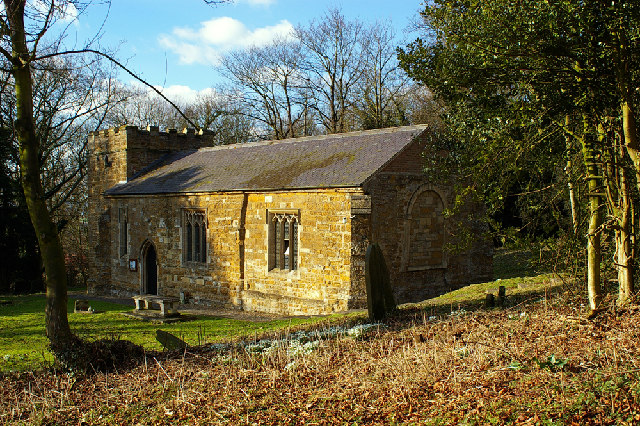
- St Margaret's, Somerby where Rossiter was buried

Deputy Lieutenant of Lincolnshire
- In office August 1660 – January 1669

Member of Parliament for Lincolnshire
- In office April 1660 – December 1660

Member of Parliament for Great Grimsby
- In office March 1646 – December 1648 (excluded in Pride's Purge)

Personal details
- Born: 1 January 1618 Somerby, England
- Died: 9 January 1669 (aged 51) Somerby, England
- Resting place: St Margaret's, Somerby
- Party: Parliamentarian
- Spouse(s): (1) Jane Samwell (1646–?) (2) Arabella Holles (1660–1669)
- Children: (1) Mary and Elizabeth (2) John, Edward, Horatio, Richard and Vere
- Education: Sidney Sussex College, Cambridge
- Occupation: Soldier and politician

Military service
- Allegiance: England
- Years of service: 1642 to 1648
- Rank: Colonel
- Battles/wars: Wars of the Three Kingdoms; Gainsborough; Relief of Newark; Battle of Melton Mowbray; Naseby; Siege of Newark; Battle of Willoughby; Siege of Pontefract Castle

Sir Edward Rossiter (1 January 1618 – 9 January 1669) was an English landowner, soldier and politician from Lincolnshire. He fought with the Parliamentarian army in the Wars of the Three Kingdoms, and sat as an MP at various times between 1646 and 1660.

When the First English Civil War began in August 1642, Rossiter joined the Eastern Association army, then transferred to the New Model Army in April 1645. He also played a prominent role in the civil administration of the East Midlands, and was nominated MP for Grimsby in March 1646. From February to July 1647, he commanded the garrison of Holdenby House, where Charles I was being held.

Rossiter was subsequently dismissed by the Army Council, who viewed him as an ally of their opponents in Parliament. Restored to the army during the 1648 Second English Civil War, he suppressed Royalist revolts in South Yorkshire and Lincolnshire. However, he was among those MPs excluded from the Commons by Pride's Purge in December 1648, and opposed the Execution of Charles I in January 1649, unlike his grandfather Sir John Bourchier.

During The Protectorate, Rossiter was elected MP for Lincolnshire in 1654, 1656 and 1659, but prevented from taking his seat as a suspected Royalist. In return for supporting the Stuart Restoration, he was knighted in May 1660 and appointed Deputy Lieutenant of Lincolnshire. However, he retired from politics and died in January 1669.

== Personal details ==
Edward Rossiter was born on 1 January 1618, second son of Richard (died before 1620) and Elizabeth Rossiter of Somerby by Bigby, Lincolnshire. He had two brothers, Richard (1616–1636) and John (before 1620-after 1634). His mother was a daughter of Sir John Bourchier (1595–1660), a devout Puritan who acted as a judge at the trial of Charles I in 1649. Following the 1660 Stuart Restoration, he escaped execution as a regicide by dying of illness while awaiting trial.

Rossiter became heir to Somerby when his elder brother Richard died in 1636, and in 1646 married Jane Samwell (1615-before 1660); they had two daughters, Mary and Elizabeth (ca 1650 to 1706).

He re-married in 1660, this time to Arabella Holles, daughter of John Holles, 2nd Earl of Clare and niece of Denzil Holles, one of the Five Members whose attempted arrest in January 1642 was a key point on the road to civil war. At his death in 1669 they had five children still living, John, Edward, Horatio, Richard and Vere; the last may have been disabled in some way as a legal guardian was appointed for her in 1689.

== First English Civil War ==
The Rossiters ranked as middle to lower members of the Lincolnshire gentry, with an estimated annual income of £1,000 in 1640 compared to £5,000 to £8,000 for the upper levels. After his father died in 1620, Elizabeth apparently took her children to live with their grandfather in Yorkshire, as Rossiter was educated at Kirton and Beverley Grammar School, before attending Sidney Sussex College, Cambridge in 1636.

When the First English Civil War began in August 1642, Rossiter joined the Parliamentarian army as captain in a regiment of cavalry raised by the Earl of Lincoln. The unit was restricted to service in Lincolnshire until April 1643, when Rossiter was promoted colonel and it became part of the Eastern Association army, commanded by Lord Willoughby. At the beginning of 1643, Royalists based in Newark captured Gainsborough, which was retaken on 16 July by the Eastern Association. On 28 July, Rossiter was with a detachment led by Oliver Cromwell which repulsed a Royalist relief force outside Gainsborough, although the Parliamentarian garrison surrendered a few days later.

East Midlands and Lincolnshire; key locations

Newark was a key strategic position linking the Royalist capital of Oxford with their armies in the north, and Rossiter spent the next two years based in Melton Mowbray as part of the Parliamentarian blockade. In March 1644, he was part of a force commanded by Sir John Meldrum defeated outside Newark by Prince Rupert. While this ensured Royalists held the town until the end of the war, the capture of Lincoln in May meant Parliament controlled the surrounding areas.

Near Melton Mowbray on 25 February 1645, Rossiter intercepted Royalist cavalry under Sir Marmaduke Langdale, on their way to lift the siege of Pontefract Castle. After a short struggle, his men retreated and although Rossiter occupied the bridge near Doncaster, he was too late to stop Langdale crossing.

In April, his unit was transferred to the New Model Army as the 5th Regiment of Horse, the only unit made up of men who had not previously served in the field armies of either Essex, Manchester, or William Waller. Although its main purpose remained securing Lincolnshire, It arrived on the morning of the Battle of Naseby in June, a victory that reduced the Royalist presence in the region to a few scattered garrisons, chiefly Oxford and Newark.

Rossiter did not participate in the New Model's 1645 Western Campaign, but remained in the region. He played a prominent part in the administration of the Eastern Association, and on 6 October 1645, he captured letters outlining Royalist attempts to win support from the Irish Confederacy. Claims that Charles wanted to employ Irish Catholics in England had been a recurring element in Parliamentarian propaganda, and they were published as proof he could not be trusted.

Another of his functions was negotiating with Royalists who wanted to surrender; when Prince Rupert and his brother Maurice were dismissed by Charles in October, they applied to Rossiter for passes to leave England, a request quickly granted by Parliament. In March 1646, Rossiter was nominated MP for Great Grimsby in place of Gervase Holles, excluded Royalist cousin of Denzil Holles. Now close to defeat, Charles left Oxford in disguise on 27 April and joined the Scots Covenanter army outside Newark, which surrendered the next day. Despite furious objections from Parliament, the Scots withdrew north to Newcastle, taking the king with them.

== Second English Civil War ==
Parliament went to war to achieve a political settlement with the king, not remove him, but arguments over the terms divided mostly Presbyterian moderates in Parliament from radicals within the New Model. At the end of January 1647 the Committee of Both Kingdoms that had governed England and Scotland since February 1644 was dissolved and replaced by the Derby House Committee, led by Holles and dominated by moderate MPs, including Rossiter. They paid the Scots £400,000 to return to Scotland and hand over Charles, who was escorted to Holdenby House, near Holmby in Northamptonshire, where Rossiter's regiment formed part of his guard.

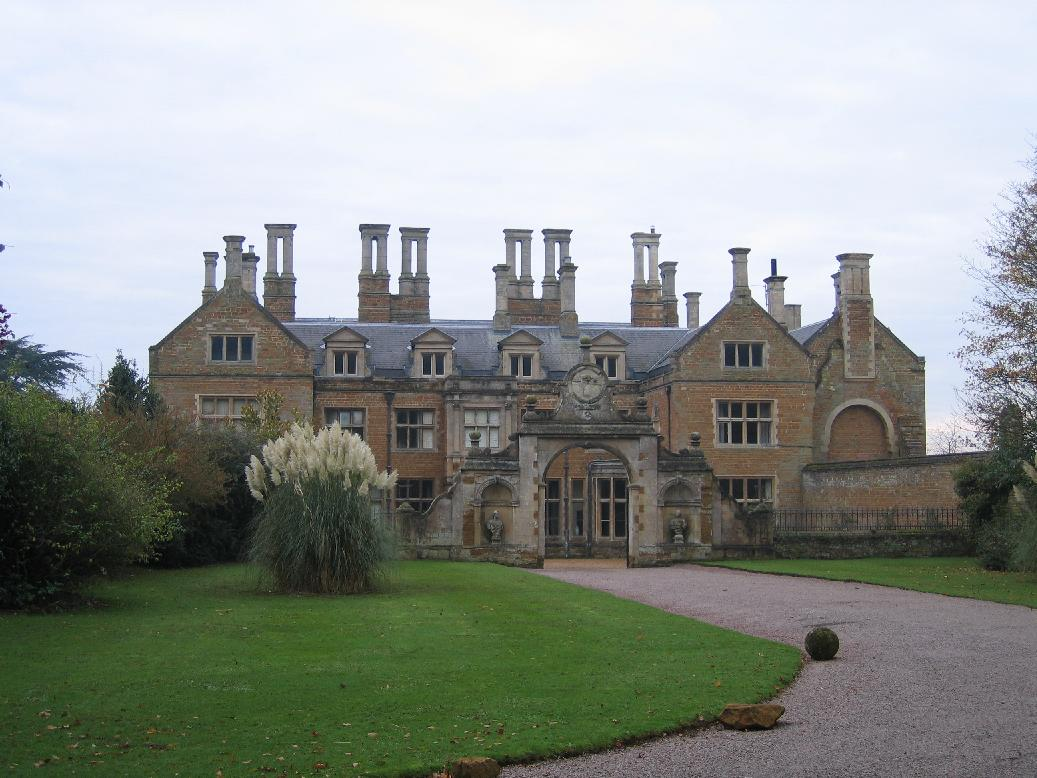
Holdenby House, where Charles was held from February to June 1647; Rossiter formed part of his guard

Divisions between Parliament and the Army Council were exacerbated by financial issues and by March 1647, the New Model was owed more than £2.5 million in unpaid wages. Parliament ordered it to Ireland, stating only those who agreed would be paid; when their representatives demanded full payment for all in advance, it was disbanded, but the Army Council refused to comply. In early June, troops from the New Model removed Charles from Holdenbury House; viewed by the Army Council as unreliable, Rossiter was dismissed in August.

When the Second English Civil War broke out in April 1648, the New Model faced multiple risings throughout England and South Wales, as well as a Scottish invasion. This left them short of men and on 6 June, Rossiter was recalled and sent to Lincoln to secure the Midlands. The Parliamentarian garrison of Pontefract defected to the Royalists and were joined by other insurgents, who sent a force of around 1,000 men into Lincolnshire to seize provisions. They were pursued by Rossiter, who defeated them near Willoughby on 5 July. John Lambert, Parliamentarian commander in the north, left Rossiter to oversee the siege of Pontefract, while he supervised the campaign that ended with the Battle of Preston in August.

The Second Civil War was notably more brutal than the first and captured Royalists previously released on parole were often executed. Prisoners taken at Willoughby included Sir Philip Monckton and Gilbert Byron, youngest brother of the Royalist general Sir John Byron; Rossiter reportedly persuaded Sir Thomas Fairfax to set them free.

== Inter-regnum and Restoration ==
Moderates like Holles grew increasingly desperate to reach agreement with Charles, who refused meaningful concessions, leading Cromwell and his supporters to conclude further talks were pointless. As one of the MPs who backed Holles and voted in favour of continuing negotiations, Rossiter was among those excluded by Pride's Purge on 6 December 1648. Unlike his grandfather, he opposed the Execution of Charles I in January 1649 and spent much of the 1649 to 1660 Interregnum in obscurity. Although elected MP for Lincolnshire in 1654, 1656 and 1659, he was prevented from sitting as a suspected Royalist. This claim had some merit, as he was allegedly involved in co-ordinating the 1659 Booth's Uprising.

He supported the Restoration of Charles II and in April 1660 was elected for Lincolnshire in the Convention Parliament. Part of the delegation sent to welcome Charles on his arrival in England, he was knighted on 27 May and appointed Deputy Lieutenant of Lincolnshire in August. However, he did not stand for re-election to Parliament in 1661, and died of cancer at home in Somerby on 9 January 1669.

== Sources ==
- Barratt, John (1975). "A Royalist Account of the Relief of Pontefract, 1st March 1645". Society for Army Historical Research. 53 (215): 159–169. JSTOR 44225367.
- Barton, Tony (2008). Colonel Edward Rossiter's Regiment of Horse. Archived from the original on 14 June 2021.
- Beardsley, WF (1908). The Battle of Willoughby Field (PDF). Leicestershire Architectural Society.
- Charles I (1645). The Kings packet of letters taken by Colonell Rossiter, as they were carrying from Newark to Belvoyr, on Munday last, Octob. 6. 1645.
- Gentles, Ian (2004). "Pride, Thomas, appointed Lord Pride under the protectorate". Oxford Dictionary of National Biography (online ed.). Oxford University Press. doi:10.1093/ref:odnb/22781. (Subscription, Wikipedia Library access or UK public library membership required.)
- Helms, MW; Crosette, JS (1983). Rossiter, Edward (1618-69), of Somerby, Lincs in The History of Parliament: the House of Commons 1660-1690. Boydell & Brewer.
- Hensman, EW (1923). "The East Midlands and the Second Civil War, May to July, 1648". Transactions of the Royal Historical Society. 6. doi:10.2307/3678430. JSTOR 3678430. S2CID 159909834.
- HMSO (1830). House of Lords Journal Volume 7: 1 November 1645. HMSO.
- Maddison, Rev A (1907). Lincolnshire pedigrees, Volume III. Publications of the Harleian society ...vol. L-LII, LV. p. 834. hdl:2027/njp.32101072878687.
- Morrill, John (1972). "Mutiny and discontent in English provincial armies 1645-1647". Past and Present. 56 (1): 49–74. doi:10.1093/past/56.1.49.
- Newton, Russell (2016). The Social Production of Gentility and Capital in Early Modern England: The Newtons of Lincolnshire (PDF) (PHD). Durham University.
- Rees, John (2016). The Leveller Revolution. Verso. ISBN 978-1784783907.
- Roberts, Stephen K (2017). 'Edward Rossiter in The Cromwell Association Online Directory of Parliamentarian Army Officers. British History Online.
- Royle, Trevor (2004). Civil War: The Wars of the Three Kingdoms 1638–1660. Abacus. ISBN 978-0-349-11564-1.
- Scott, David (2004). "Bourchier, Sir John (1595-1660". Oxford Dictionary of National Biography (online ed.). Oxford University Press. doi:10.1093/ref:odnb/2991. (Subscription, Wikipedia Library access or UK public library membership required.)
- Temple, Robert KG (1986). "The Original Officer List of the New Model Army". Historical Research. 59 (139): 50–77. doi:10.1111/j.1468-2281.1986.tb01179.x.
- Young, Peter; Holmes, Richard (2000). The English Civil War. Wordsworth Editions. ISBN 1-84022-222-0.
- West, John (1993). Gaunt, Peter (ed.). "Oliver Cromwell and the Battle of Gainsborough, July 1643" (PDF). Cromwelliana 1993. The Cromwell Association. ISBN 0-905729-04-8.
