= 1995–96 Barnsley F.C. season =

Barnsley
1995–96 season
- Chairman: John Dennis
- Manager: Danny Wilson
- Stadium: Oakwell
- First Division: 10th
- FA Cup: Third round
- League Cup: Third round
- Top goalscorer: League: Payton (16); All: Payton (19)
- Average home league attendance: 8,086

During the 1995–96 English football season, Barnsley F.C. competed in the Football League First Division.

== Season summary ==
In the 1995–96 season, Barnsley started brightly with 5 league wins from their first 9 games which saw them sit in 3rd place by around mid-September but their form faltered through the first half of the season afterwards and by Christmas, Barnsley sat in a lowly 15th place after winning just two from their next 14 league games onwards. From Boxing Day to the end of February, Barnsley went on a good run of form winning five of the next 9 league matches with just one defeat, which saw the Tykes in the playoff places and a top six finish seemed possible but again from there until the end of the season, their form faltered again winning two from their final 14 league games and ended the season in a disappointing 10th place, after being playoff contenders at one stage.

== Final league table ==
Pos	Team	Pld	W	D	L	GF	GA	GD	Pts
8	Huddersfield Town	46	17	12	17	61	58	+3	63
9	Sheffield United	46	16	14	16	57	54	+3	62
10	Barnsley	46	14	18	14	60	66	−6	60
11	West Bromwich Albion	46	16	12	18	60	68	−8	60
12	Port Vale	46	15	15	16	59	66	−7	60

Rules for classification: 1) Points; 2) Goals scored; 3) Goal difference

== Results ==
Barnsley's score comes first

=== Legend ===
Win	Draw	Loss

=== Football League First Division ===
Date	Opponent	Venue	Result	Attendance	Scorers
12 August 1995	Crystal Palace	A	3–4	12,067	Liddell, Davis, Viveash
19 August 1995	Oldham Athletic	H	2–1	8,795	Payton, Redfearn (pen)
26 August 1995	Watford	A	3–2	8,049	Rammell (2), Davis
29 August 1995	Tranmere Rovers	H	2–1	9,710	Payton, Davis
2 September 1995	Birmingham City	H	0–5	11,121	
9 September 1995	Millwall	A	1–0	9,272	Redfearn
12 September 1995	Huddersfield Town	A	0–3	14,635	
17 September 1995	Sheffield United	H	2–2	7,150	Davis, Payton
23 September 1995	Derby County	H	2–0	8,929	Liddell (2)
30 September 1995	Charlton Athletic	A	1–1	11,219	Redfearn
7 October 1995	Leicester City	H	2–2	13,669	Payton, Bullock
14 October 1995	Norwich City	A	1–3	14,002	Eaden
21 October 1995	Port Vale	H	1–1	7,332	Archdeacon
28 October 1995	Sunderland	A	1–2	17,024	Liddell
4 November 1995	Wolverhampton Wanderers	H	1–0	9,668	Redfearn
11 November 1995	Grimsby Town	A	1–3	6,166	Davis
18 November 1995	Reading	A	0–0	6,695	
21 November 1995	Portsmouth	H	0–0	6,194	
25 November 1995	Luton Town	H	1–0	6,437	Redfearn
2 December 1995	Leicester City	A	2–2	15,125	Payton (2)
9 December 1995	Derby County	A	1–4	14,415	Rammell
16 December 1995	Charlton Athletic	H	1–2	6,140	Payton
22 December 1995	Ipswich Town	A	2–2	11,791	Liddell, de Zeeuw
26 December 1995	Stoke City	H	3–1	9,229	Redfearn, Rammell, Liddell
1 January 1996	Southend United	A	0–0	6,537	
13 January 1996	Oldham Athletic	A	1–0	6,029	Payton
20 January 1996	Crystal Palace	H	1–1	6,620	Liddell
3 February 1996	Watford	H	2–1	6,139	Archdeacon, Payton
10 February 1996	Tranmere Rovers	A	3–1	6,376	Payton (2), Redfearn (pen)
20 February 1996	Birmingham City	A	0–0	14,168	
24 February 1996	Sheffield United	A	0–1	14,584	
27 February 1996	Millwall	H	3–1	6,331	Payton (2), Liddell
2 March 1996	Stoke City	A	0–2	12,655	
9 March 1996	Ipswich Town	H	3–3	7,705	Redfearn (2), Liddell
16 March 1996	West Bromwich Albion	A	1–2	12,701	Payton
19 March 1996	Huddersfield Town	H	3–0	10,660	Eaden, Redfearn, Archdeacon
23 March 1996	Southend United	H	1–1	6,754	Rammell
30 March 1996	Port Vale	A	0–3	7,358	
2 April 1996	Norwich City	H	2–2	6,375	Redfearn, Payton
6 April 1996	Sunderland	H	0–1	13,189	
8 April 1996	Wolverhampton Wanderers	A	2–2	23,789	Payton, Moses
13 April 1996	Reading	H	0–1	5,440	
20 April 1996	Portsmouth	A	0–0	8,734	
27 April 1996	Luton Town	A	3–1	6,194	Redfearn (2), O'Connell
30 April 1996	West Bromwich Albion	H	1–1	6,981	Regis
4 May 1996	Grimsby Town	H	1–1	6,108	Redfearn

=== FA Cup ===
Round	Date	Opponent	Venue	Result	Attendance	Goalscorers
R3	6 January 1996	Oldham Athletic	H	0–0	9,751	
R3R	23 January 1996	Oldham Athletic	A	1–2	6,670	Redfearn

=== League Cup ===
Round	Date	Opponent	Venue	Result	Attendance	Goalscorers
R2 1st Leg	19 September 1995	Huddersfield Town	A	0–2	8,264	
R2 2nd Leg	3 October 1995	Huddersfield Town	H	4–0 (won 4–2 on agg)	8,192	Payton (3), Rammell
R3	24 October 1995	Arsenal	H	0–3	18,429	

== Squad ==
Note: Flags indicate national team as defined under FIFA eligibility rules; some limited exceptions apply. Players may hold more than one non-FIFA nationality.

No.	Pos.	Nation	Player
—	GK	ENG	Lee Butler
—	GK	ENG	Adam Sollitt
—	GK	ENG	David Watson
—	DF	ENG	Charlie Bishop
—	DF	ENG	Steve Davis
—	DF	ENG	Nicky Eaden
—	DF	ENG	Adie Moses
—	DF	NED	Arjan de Zeeuw
—	DF	NIR	Gary Fleming
—	DF	ENG	Scott Jones
—	DF	ENG	Peter Shirtliff
—	DF	ENG	Malcolm Shotton
—	DF	ENG	Adi Viveash (on loan from Swindon Town)
—	MF	SCO	Owen Archdeacon
—	MF	ENG	Martin Bullock
—	MF	ENG	Andrew Gregory

No.	Pos.	Nation	Player
—	MF	SCO	Paul Kane (on loan from Aberdeen)
—	MF	DEN	Jan Mølby (on loan from Liverpool)
—	MF	ENG	Brendan O'Connell
—	MF	ENG	Neil Redfearn
—	MF	ENG	Darren Sheridan
—	MF	NED	Carel van der Velden
—	FW	ENG	Luke Beckett
—	FW	ENG	Simon Bochenski
—	FW	ENG	Glynn Hurst
—	FW	ENG	Chris Jackson
—	FW	SCO	Andy Liddell
—	FW	ENG	Andy Payton
—	FW	ENG	Andy Rammell
—	FW	ENG	Dave Regis
—	FW	ENG	Karl Rose
—	FW	NED	Laurens ten Heuvel
