= 1994–95 Barnsley F.C. season =

Barnsley
1994–95 season
- Chairman: John Dennis
- Manager: Danny Wilson (player-manager)
- Stadium: Oakwell
- First Division: 6th
- FA Cup: Third round
- League Cup: Second round
- Top goalscorer: Liddell (13)
- Average home league attendance: 6,509

During the 1994–95 English football season, Barnsley F.C. competed in the Football League First Division.

== Season summary ==
In the 1994–95 season, the Tykes finished sixth in the First Division. In an ordinary season this would have meant occupying a playoff place, but due to the Premier League reducing from 22 to 20 clubs, only two teams would be promoted (with fifth placed club occupying the final playoff place) and Barnsley missed out.

== Final league table ==
Pos	Team	Pld	W	D	L	GF	GA	GD	Pts	Qualification or relegation
4	Wolverhampton Wanderers	46	21	13	12	77	61	+16	76	Qualification for the First Division play-offs
5	Tranmere Rovers	46	22	10	14	67	58	+9	76	Qualification for the First Division play-offs
6	Barnsley	46	20	12	14	63	52	+11	72	
7	Watford	46	19	13	14	52	46	+6	70	
8	Sheffield United	46	17	17	12	74	55	+19	68	

Rules for classification: 1) Points; 2) Goals scored; 3) Goal difference

== Results ==
Barnsley's score comes first

=== Legend ===
Win	Draw	Loss

=== Football League First Division ===
Date	Opponent	Venue	Result	Attendance	Scorers
13 August 1994	Derby County	H	2–1	8,737	Rammell (2)
20 August 1994	Charlton Athletic	A	2–2	8,171	Davis, Payton
27 August 1994	Reading	H	0–2	4,771	
30 August 1994	Port Vale	A	1–2	7,228	O'Connell
3 September 1994	Burnley	A	1–0	11,989	Payton
10 September 1994	Watford	H	0–0	4,251	
13 September 1994	Notts County	H	1–1	3,928	Rammell
17 September 1994	Sunderland	A	0–2	16,145	
24 September 1994	Oldham Athletic	A	0–1	7,941	
1 October 1994	Swindon Town	H	2–1	3,911	Redfearn (2)
8 October 1994	Southend United	H	0–0	3,659	
16 October 1994	Sheffield United	A	0–0	12,317	
22 October 1994	West Bromwich Albion	H	2–0	5,082	O'Connell, Redfearn
29 October 1994	Luton Town	A	1–0	7,212	Rammell
1 November 1994	Tranmere Rovers	A	1–6	5,592	Rammell
5 November 1994	Stoke City	H	2–0	5,117	O'Connell, Sheridan
19 November 1994	Millwall	A	1–0	7,040	Liddell
26 November 1994	Bolton Wanderers	H	3–0	8,507	Eaden, Davis, Redfearn
3 December 1994	West Bromwich Albion	A	1–2	13,921	Jackson
7 December 1994	Bristol City	H	2–1	4,305	Liddell, Archdeacon
10 December 1994	Charlton Athletic	H	2–1	5,465	Redfearn, Liddell
17 December 1994	Derby County	A	0–1	13,205	
26 December 1994	Grimsby Town	H	4–1	8,669	Payton (3), Liddell
27 December 1994	Portsmouth	A	0–3	6,751	
31 December 1994	Wolverhampton Wanderers	H	1–3	9,207	Redfearn (pen)
14 January 1995	Luton Town	H	3–1	4,808	Redfearn, Liddell (2)
4 February 1995	Bristol City	A	2–3	6,408	Wilson, Rammell
11 February 1995	Tranmere Rovers	H	2–2	5,506	Rammell, Redfearn
18 February 1995	Bolton Wanderers	A	1–2	12,463	Liddell
21 February 1995	Millwall	H	4–1	4,733	Redfearn (2), Payton (2)
25 February 1995	Swindon Town	A	0–0	8,636	
7 March 1995	Burnley	H	2–0	5,537	Taggart, Payton
11 March 1995	Reading	A	3–0	7,556	O'Connell, Taggart, Payton
14 March 1995	Middlesbrough	A	1–1	19,655	Payton
18 March 1995	Port Vale	H	3–1	6,878	Liddell (2), Sheridan
21 March 1995	Watford	A	2–3	6,883	Liddell (2)
24 March 1995	Sunderland	H	2–0	7,804	Shotton, Payton
1 April 1995	Notts County	A	3–1	6,834	O'Connell, Liddell, Wilson
8 April 1995	Wolverhampton Wanderers	A	0–0	26,385	
12 April 1995	Stoke City	A	0–0	10,734	
15 April 1995	Portsmouth	H	1–0	6,825	Payton
17 April 1995	Grimsby Town	A	0–1	7,277	
22 April 1995	Middlesbrough	H	1–1	11,711	Liddell
29 April 1995	Sheffield United	H	2–1	10,844	O'Connell (2)
2 May 1995	Oldham Athletic	H	1–1	9,838	Taggart
7 May 1995	Southend United	A	1–3	6,425	Redfearn

=== FA Cup ===
Round	Date	Opponent	Venue	Result	Attendance	Goalscorers
R3	7 January 1995	Aston Villa	H	0–2	11,469	

=== League Cup ===
Round	Date	Opponent	Venue	Result	Attendance	Goalscorers
R1 First Leg	17 August 1994	Darlington	A	2–2	2,207	Redfearn, Taggart
R1 Second Leg	23 August 1994	Darlington	H	0–0 (won on away goals)	3,263	
R2 First Leg	21 September 1994	Newcastle United	A	1–2	27,208	Redfearn 20'
R2 Second Leg	5 October 1994	Newcastle United	H	0–1 (lost 1–3 on agg)	10,992	

== Squad ==
Note: Flags indicate national team as defined under FIFA eligibility rules; some limited exceptions apply. Players may hold more than one non-FIFA nationality.

No.	Pos.	Nation	Player
—	GK	ENG	Lee Butler
—	GK	ENG	David Watson
—	DF	NIR	Gary Fleming
—	DF	ENG	Nicky Eaden
—	DF	NIR	Gerry Taggart
—	DF	ENG	Charlie Bishop
—	DF	ENG	Adie Moses
—	DF	ENG	Steve Davis
—	DF	ENG	Malcolm Shotton
—	DF	ENG	Scott Jones
—	DF	ENG	Glynn Snodin
—	MF	ENG	Brendan O'Connell

No.	Pos.	Nation	Player
—	MF	SCO	Owen Archdeacon
—	MF	ENG	Neil Redfearn
—	MF	ENG	Darren Sheridan
—	MF	ENG	Martin Bullock
—	MF	NIR	Danny Wilson (player-manager)
—	MF	ENG	Gareth Williams
—	FW	SCO	Andy Liddell
—	FW	ENG	Andy Payton
—	FW	ENG	Andy Rammell
—	FW	ENG	Glynn Hurst
—	FW	ENG	Chris Jackson
