= 1993–94 Barnsley F.C. season =

Barnsley
1993–94 season
- Chairman: John Dennis
- Manager: Viv Anderson (player-manager)
- Stadium: Oakwell
- First Division: 18th
- FA Cup: Fifth round
- League Cup: Second round
- Top goalscorer: League: Redfearn/Payton (12); All: Payton (13)
- Average home league attendance: 7,610

During the 1993–94 English football season, Barnsley F.C. competed in the Football League First Division.

== Season summary ==
In June 1993, Barnsley appointed Viv Anderson as player-manager but endured a poor 1993–94 season and were stuck in a relegation battle for most of the season but a good run of 7 wins from 9 league games in the 2nd half of the season (picking up 21 points out of the possible 27), was just enough to keep the Tykes in the division despite losing 7 out of the final 10 league games.

== Final league table ==
Pos	Team	Pld	W	D	L	GF	GA	GD	Pts
16	Grimsby Town	46	13	20	13	52	47	+5	59
17	Portsmouth	46	15	13	18	52	58	−6	58
18	Barnsley	46	16	7	23	55	67	−12	55
19	Watford	46	15	9	22	66	80	−14	54
20	Luton Town	46	14	11	21	56	60	−4	53

Source: rsssf.com
Rules for classification: 1) Points; 2) Goals scored; 3) Goal difference

== Results ==
Barnsley's score comes first

=== Legend ===
Win	Draw	Loss

=== Football League First Division ===
Date	Opponent	Venue	Result	Attendance	Scorers
14 August 1993	West Bromwich Albion	H	1–1	12,940	Anderson
17 August 1993	Peterborough United	A	1–4	5,875	Currie
21 August 1993	Watford	A	2–0	5,937	Biggins, Bryson
24 August 1993	Middlesbrough	H	1–4	10,597	Anderson
28 August 1993	Birmingham City	H	2–3	7,241	Anderson, Redfearn
4 September 1993	Millwall	A	0–2	8,004	
11 September 1993	Nottingham Forest	H	1–0	13,270	Archdeacon (pen)
18 September 1993	Tranmere Rovers	A	3–0	18,292	Rammell, Redfearn, O'Connell
25 September 1993	Leicester City	H	0–1	10,392	
2 October 1993	Luton Town	A	0–5	6,201	
9 October 1993	Charlton Athletic	H	0–1	5,186	
16 October 1993	Bristol City	A	2–0	6,923	Bryson, Redfearn
23 October 1993	Southend United	H	1–3	5,240	Redfearn (pen)
30 October 1993	Stoke City	A	4–5	14,679	Archdeacon, Redfearn, O'Connell, Bryson
2 November 1993	Oxford United	A	1–1	4,065	Redfearn
7 November 1993	Grimsby Town	H	1–2	5,797	O'Connell
13 November 1993	Wolverhampton Wanderers	A	1–1	18,355	Biggins
20 November 1993	Crystal Palace	H	1–3	5,384	Redfearn
27 November 1993	Bolton Wanderers	H	1–1	6,755	Jackson
4 December 1993	Grimsby Town	A	2–2	8,123	Redfearn, Payton
11 December 1993	Peterborough United	H	1–0	6,424	Payton
19 December 1993	West Bromwich Albion	A	1–1	16,062	Payton
27 December 1993	Derby County	H	0–1	11,562	
1 January 1994	Portsmouth	H	2–0	6,328	O'Connell, Redfearn
3 January 1994	Sunderland	A	0–1	19,096	
15 January 1994	Bristol City	H	1–1	5,222	Rammell
22 January 1994	Charlton Athletic	A	1–2	7,072	Payton
5 February 1994	Southend United	A	3–0	4,101	Eaden, Redfearn, Rammell
12 February 1994	Stoke City	H	3–0	7,651	Rammell, Redfearn, Taggart
1 March 1994	Notts County	A	1–3	6,297	Payton
5 March 1994	Birmingham City	A	2–0	28,039	O'Connell, Rammell
12 March 1994	Tranmere Rovers	H	1–0	6,203	Payton
16 March 1994	Nottingham Forest	A	1–2	20,491	Taggart
19 March 1994	Leicester City	A	1–0	15,640	Payton
26 March 1994	Luton Town	H	1–0	6,289	Payton
29 March 1994	Sunderland	H	4–0	12,405	Eaden, Liddell, Rammell, Payton
2 April 1994	Derby County	A	0–2	14,968	
4 April 1994	Notts County	H	0–3	6,827	
9 April 1994	Portsmouth	A	1–2	7,005	Redfearn (pen)
12 April 1994	Watford	A	0–1	4,380	
16 April 1994	Oxford United	H	1–0	4,874	Williams
23 April 1994	Crystal Palace	A	0–1	20,522	
26 April 1994	Middlesbrough	A	0–5	6,368	
30 April 1994	Wolverhampton Wanderers	H	2–0	11,329	O'Connell, Payton
3 May 1994	Millwall	H	0–1	5,059	
8 May 1994	Bolton Wanderers	A	3–2	11,661	Bishop, Payton (2)

=== FA Cup ===
Round	Date	Opponent	Venue	Result	Attendance	Goalscorers
R3	8 January 1994	Bromsgrove Rovers	A	2–1	4,893	Rammell, Archdeacon
R4	29 January 1994	Plymouth Argyle	A	2–2	12,760	Taggart, Payton
R4R	19 February 1994	Plymouth Argyle	H	1–0	10,900	O'Connell
R5	2 March 1994	Oldham Athletic	A	0–1	15,685	

=== League Cup ===
Round	Date	Opponent	Venue	Result	Attendance	Goalscorers
R2 1st leg	21 September 1993	Peterborough United	H	1–1	4,549	Archdeacon (pen)
R2 2nd leg	5 October 1993	Peterborough United	A	1–3 (lost 2–4 on agg)	3,533	Bryson

== Squad ==
Note: Flags indicate national team as defined under FIFA eligibility rules; some limited exceptions apply. Players may hold more than one non-FIFA nationality.

No.	Pos.	Nation	Player
-	GK	ENG	Lee Butler
-	DF	ENG	Nicky Eaden
-	DF	NIR	Gerry Taggart
-	DF	ENG	Steve Davis
-	DF	NIR	Gary Fleming
-	MF	ENG	Neil Redfearn
-	MF	ENG	Martin Bullock
-	MF	ENG	Brendan O'Connell
-	FW	SCO	Andy Liddell
-	FW	ENG	Andy Rammell
-	DF	ENG	Adie Moses
-	GK	ENG	David Watson
-	DF	ENG	Charlie Bishop

No.	Pos.	Nation	Player
-	MF	ENG	Darren Sheridan
-	MF	SCO	Owen Archdeacon
-	FW	ENG	Andy Payton
-	MF	NIR	Danny Wilson
-	DF	ENG	Scott Jones
-	DF	ENG	Viv Anderson (player-manager)
-	MF	ENG	Gareth Williams
-	FW	WAL	Deiniol Graham
-	DF	ENG	Glynn Snodin
-	DF	ENG	Chris Boden (on loan from Aston Villa)
-	FW	ENG	Chris Jackson
-	DF	ENG	Jamie Robinson

=== Left the club during season ===
Note: Flags indicate national team as defined under FIFA eligibility rules; some limited exceptions apply. Players may hold more than one non-FIFA nationality.

No.	Pos.	Nation	Player
-	GK	ENG	Phil Whitehead (to Oxford United)
-	MF	SCO	Ian Bryson (to Preston North End)

No.	Pos.	Nation	Player
-	FW	ENG	Wayne Biggins (to Celtic)
