= 1996–97 Barnsley F.C. season =

Barnsley
1996–97 season
- Chairman: John Dennis
- Manager: (Northern Ireland) Danny Wilson
- Stadium: Oakwell
- Football League First Division: 2nd (promoted)
- FA Cup: Fourth round
- League Cup: Second round
- Top goalscorer: League: Redfearn (17); All: Redfearn (19)
- Highest home attendance: 18,605 vs. Bradford City (26 April 1997)
- Lowest home attendance: 6,337 vs. Oxford United (15 October 1996)
- Average home league attendance: 11,356

During the 1996–97 English football season, Barnsley F.C. competed in the Football League First Division.

== Season summary ==
Manager Danny Wilson successfully acquired a number of signings in the summer that were to play huge roles, amongst these were the vastly experienced duo Neil Thompson and Paul Wilkinson, as well as youngster Matty Appleby.

Oakwell also gained an international flavour, as Jovo Bosančić and Trinidad and Tobago international Clint Marcelle were to sign, with Marcelle's work permit clearing just a couple of days prior to the Red's first game of the season, an away match at West Bromwich Albion. Marcelle was cleared to play and scored the opening goal of the season in a 2–1 victory. Barnsley went on to equal their best start to a season by winning the next four games. Wilson then further improved the team by bringing in Scottish forward John Hendrie, who had partnered Wilkinson at Middlesbrough.

Bolton Wanderers looked increasingly likely to win the league as the season progressed, the Reds played both games against the Trotters relatively early on in the season, with the two games both resulting in 2–2 draws. As the season neared its closing stages, it looked as if either Barnsley or Mark McGhee's Wolverhampton Wanderers would join Bolton.

In Barnsley's final home game of the season, a Yorkshire derby against Bradford City, the team knew a win would be enough to secure promotion to the top tier of English football for the first time in the club's history. The side dominated the game, but led only 1–0 at half time thanks to a Wilkinson goal. With only a few minutes remaining, Clint Marcelle, the man who had scored the opening goal of the season scored the Red's final goal at home. As the final whistle blew, the fans swarmed onto the pitch amid jubilant celebrations.

The team lost their final game of the season 5–1 away at Oxford United; however the joy of promotion remained throughout the summer and the team later had an open-top bus celebration around the town, culminating at the town hall.

== Final league table ==
Pos	Team	Pld	W	D	L	GF	GA	GD	Pts	Qualification or relegation
1	Bolton Wanderers (C, P)	46	28	14	4	100	53	+47	98	Promotion to the Premier League
2	Barnsley (P)	46	22	14	10	76	55	+21	80	Promotion to the Premier League
3	Wolverhampton Wanderers	46	22	10	14	68	51	+17	76	Qualification for the First Division play-offs
4	Ipswich Town	46	20	14	12	68	50	+18	74	Qualification for the First Division play-offs
5	Sheffield United	46	20	13	13	75	52	+23	73	Qualification for the First Division play-offs

Rules for classification: 1) Points; 2) Goals scored; 3) Goal difference
(C) Champions; (P) Promoted

== Results ==
Barnsley's score comes first

=== Legend ===
Win	Draw	Loss

=== Football League First Division ===
Date	Opponent	Venue	Result	Attendance	Scorers
17 August 1996	West Bromwich Albion	A	2–1	18,561	Marcelle, Liddell
25 August 1996	Huddersfield Town	H	3–1	9,787	Wilkinson, Redfearn, Marcelle
28 August 1996	Reading	H	3–0	7,523	Sheridan, Liddell (2)
7 September 1996	Manchester City	A	2–1	26,464	Marcelle (2)
10 September 1996	Stoke City	H	3–0	11,696	Davis, Thompson, Liddell
14 September 1996	Queens Park Rangers	H	1–3	13,003	Wilkinson
21 September 1996	Oldham Athletic	A	1–0	7,043	Redfearn (pen)
28 September 1996	Grimsby Town	H	1–3	8,833	Liddell
1 October 1996	Ipswich Town	A	1–1	9,041	Redfearn (pen)
12 October 1996	Crystal Palace	H	0–0	9,183	
15 October 1996	Oxford United	H	0–0	6,337	
19 October 1996	Bradford City	A	2–2	11,477	Liddell, Davis
25 October 1996	Bolton Wanderers	H	2–2	9,413	Redfearn (2, 1 pen)
29 October 1996	Port Vale	A	3–1	5,231	Hendrie, de Zeeuw, Marcelle
2 November 1996	Wolverhampton Wanderers	A	3–3	22,840	de Zeeuw, Redfearn (pen), Eaden
12 November 1996	Norwich City	H	3–1	9,697	Moses, Wilkinson, Hendrie
16 November 1996	Swindon Town	A	0–3	10,837	
23 November 1996	Portsmouth	H	3–2	7,449	Wilkinson, Hendrie, Davis
30 November 1996	Bolton Wanderers	A	2–2	16,852	Redfearn (2, 1 pen)
3 December 1996	Birmingham City	A	0–0	24,004	
7 December 1996	Southend United	H	3–0	7,483	Hendrie, Wilkinson (2)
14 December 1996	Tranmere Rovers	H	3–0	8,513	Hendrie, Wilkinson, Redfearn (pen)
21 December 1996	Sheffield United	A	1–0	24,384	Hendrie
26 December 1996	Stoke City	A	0–1	19,025	
28 December 1996	Manchester City	H	2–0	17,159	Bosančić (pen), Moses
11 January 1997	Queens Park Rangers	A	1–3	12,058	Redfearn
18 January 1997	Ipswich Town	H	1–2	9,872	Liddell
28 January 1997	Grimsby Town	A	3–2	6,323	Hendrie (3)
1 February 1997	Norwich City	A	1–1	17,001	Eaden
8 February 1997	Port Vale	H	1–0	12,246	Hendrie
15 February 1997	Charlton Athletic	A	2–2	9,104	Hendrie (2)
22 February 1997	Wolverhampton Wanderers	H	1–3	18,024	Sheridan
1 March 1997	Southend United	A	2–1	4,855	Redfearn (2)
4 March 1997	Swindon Town	H	1–1	8,518	Redfearn
7 March 1997	Sheffield United	H	2–0	14,668	Hendrie, Eaden
15 March 1997	Tranmere Rovers	A	1–1	7,347	Wilkinson
22 March 1997	Huddersfield Town	A	0–0	14,754	
28 March 1997	West Bromwich Albion	H	2–0	12,087	Redfearn, Thompson (pen)
31 March 1997	Reading	A	2–1	10,244	Holsgrove (own goal), Liddell
5 April 1997	Birmingham City	H	0–1	13,092	
12 April 1997	Charlton Athletic	H	4–0	11,701	Marcelle, Thompson (2), Hendrie
15 April 1997	Oldham Athletic	H	2–0	17,476	Hendrie, Marcelle
19 April 1997	Crystal Palace	A	1–1	20,006	Thompson (pen)
22 April 1997	Portsmouth	A	2–4	8,328	Redfearn (2)
26 April 1997	Bradford City	H	2–0	18,605	Wilkinson, Marcelle
4 May 1997	Oxford United	A	1–5	8,693	Redfearn

=== FA Cup ===
Round	Date	Opponent	Venue	Result	Attendance	Goalscorers
R3	14 January 1997	Oldham Athletic	H	2–0	9,936	Bullock, Marcelle
R4	25 January 1997	Queens Park Rangers	A	2–3	14,317	Redfearn, Hendrie

=== League Cup ===
Round	Date	Opponent	Venue	Result	Attendance	Goalscorers
R1 First Leg	20 August 1996	Rochdale	A	1–2	2,426	Wilkinson
R1 Second Leg	3 September 1996	Rochdale	H	2–0	5,638	Redfearn, Wilkinson
R2 First Leg	17 September 1996	Gillingham	H	1–1	4,491	Onuora (own goal)
R2 Second Leg	24 September 1996	Gillingham	A	0–1	5,666	

== Squad ==
Note: Flags indicate national team as defined under FIFA eligibility rules; some limited exceptions apply. Players may hold more than one non-FIFA nationality.

No.	Pos.	Nation	Player
-	GK	(England) ENG	David Watson
-	DF	(England) ENG	Nicky Eaden
-	DF	(Netherlands) NED	Arjan de Zeeuw
-	DF	(England) ENG	Adie Moses
-	DF	(England) ENG	Neil Thompson
-	MF	(England) ENG	Neil Redfearn
-	FW	(Scotland) SCO	John Hendrie
-	MF	(England) ENG	Martin Bullock
-	DF	(England) ENG	Steve Davis
-	FW	(England) ENG	Paul Wilkinson
-	MF	(England) ENG	Darren Sheridan

No.	Pos.	Nation	Player
-	FW	(Trinidad and Tobago) TRI	Clint Marcelle
-	MF	(England) ENG	Matty Appleby
-	FW	(Scotland) SCO	Andy Liddell
-	DF	(England) ENG	Peter Shirtliff
-	MF	(Federal Republic of Yugoslavia) YUG	Jovo Bosančić
-	DF	(England) ENG	Scott Jones
-	FW	(South Africa) RSA	Glynn Hurst
-	FW	(Netherlands) NED	Laurens ten Heuvel
-	MF	(Netherlands) NED	Carel van der Velden
-	FW	(England) ENG	Dave Regis
