= Charlie Bishop (footballer) =

English footballer (born 1968)

Personal information
- Full name: Darren Charles Bishop
- Date of birth: 16 February 1968 (age 58)
- Place of birth: Nottingham, England
- Height: 5 ft 11 in (1.80 m)
- Position: Defender

Senior career*
Years	Team	Apps	(Gls)
1985–1986	Stoke City	0	(0)
1986–1987	Watford	0	(0)
1987–1991	Bury	114	(6)
1991–1996	Barnsley	130	(1)
1996	→ Preston North End (loan)	4	(0)
1996	→ Burnley (loan)	9	(0)
1996–1997	Wigan Athletic	28	(0)
1997–1998	Northampton Town	12	(0)
1998–2000	Ilkeston Town		

Managerial career
- 2001: Ilkeston Town (joint manager)
- 2002–2003: Ilkeston Town
- * Club domestic league appearances and goals

Darren Charles Bishop (born 16 February 1968) is an English former professional footballer who played as a defender. He played in the Football League for Bury, Barnsley, Preston North End, Burnley, Wigan Athletic and Northampton Town, making more than 350 senior appearances.

== Playing career ==
Born in Nottingham, Bishop started his playing career as an apprentice at Stoke City before joining Watford in April 1986, but he did not make a senior appearance for either club. He signed for Bury ahead of the 1987–88 season and went on to score six goals in 114 league matches for the side. In the summer of 1991 Bishop transferred to Second Division outfit Barnsley for a fee of £50,000. He spent five years with the Oakwell club, making more than 150 first-team appearances in all competitions and scoring once. He lost his first-team place to Steve Davis during his final season with Barnsley and was consequently loaned out on two occasions, firstly to Preston North End, where he played four league matches, before joining Burnley on the last day of the 1996 transfer window.

Bishop made his debut for Burnley on 30 March 1996 in the 1–4 away defeat to Wycombe Wanderers, taking the place of Chris Vinnicombe, who was out with a broken ankle. He played eight more matches for the Lancashire club before leaving at the end of the 1995–96 season. Burnley manager Adrian Heath considered signing Bishop on a permanent deal that summer but the player instead moved to Wigan Athletic for a transfer fee of £20,000. He made 32 appearances for the club before joining Northampton Town for the same fee in December 1997, where he played 12 league games during an 18-month spell. Bishop ended his playing career with a spell at non-league Ilkeston Town before retiring from football in 2000.

== Managerial career ==
Towards the end of the 2000–01 season, Bishop was one of a trio of managers alongside Chris Marples and former Burnley teammate Ian Helliwell hired by Ilkeston Town, who then played in Southern League Premier Division, to save the club from relegation. The task was achieved successfully and Marples was consequently given the managerial role on a permanent basis while Helliwell returned to his playing role and Bishop left the club. In October 2002, Bishop was appointed manager of Ilkeston for a second time with fellow former player John Knapper as his assistant. The pair took over from John McGinlay, who had been sacked the previous week. The team were relegated during his first season in charge to the Southern League Western Division. Ilkeston started the following campaign well but following a run of poor form which included five defeats in six matches, Bishop was dismissed and Phil Stant was brought in as his replacement.

== Career statistics ==
Appearances and goals by club, season and competition
Club	Season	League			FA Cup		League Cup		Other		Total	
Club	Season	Division	Apps	Goals	Apps	Goals	Apps	Goals	Apps	Goals	Apps	Goals
Stoke City	1985–86	Second Division	0	0	0	0	0	0	0	0	0	0
Watford	1986–87	First Division	0	0	0	0	0	0	0	0	0	0
Bury	1987–88	Third Division	17	0	0	0	0	0	4	0	21	0
Bury	1988–89	Third Division	38	3	2	0	4	0	1	0	48	3
Bury	1989–90	Third Division	30	1	2	1	0	0	4	0	36	2
Bury	1990–91	Third Division	29	2	0	0	1	0	4	0	34	2
Bury	Total		114	6	4	1	5	0	13	0	136	7
Barnsley	1991–92	Second Division	28	0	1	0	1	0	1	0	31	0
Barnsley	1992–93	First Division	43	0	4	0	2	0	2	0	51	0
Barnsley	1993–94	First Division	38	1	4	0	2	0	2	0	46	1
Barnsley	1994–95	First Division	8	0	0	0	4	0	0	0	12	0
Barnsley	1995–96	First Division	13	0	0	0	3	0	0	0	15	0
Barnsley	Total		130	1	9	0	12	0	5	0	156	1
Preston North End (loan)	1995–96	Third Division	4	0	0	0	0	0	0	0	4	0
Burnley (loan)	1995–96	Second Division	9	0	0	0	0	0	0	0	9	0
Wigan Athletic	1996–97	Third Division	20	0	0	0	1	0	1	0	21	0
Wigan Athletic	1997–98	Second Division	7	0	0	0	0	0	1	0	8	0
Wigan Athletic	Total		27	0	0	0	1	0	2	0	29	0
Northampton Town	1997–98	Second Division	7	0	1	0	0	0	1	0	9	0
Northampton Town	1998–99	Second Division	4	0	0	0	2	0	0	0	6	0
Northampton Town	Total		11	0	1	0	2	0	1	0	15	0
Career total			295	7	14	1	20	0	21	0	350	8

== Honours ==
Wigan Athletic

- Football League Third Division: 1996–97
