= Martin Bullock =

English footballer (born 1975)

Personal information
- Full name: Martin John Bullock
- Date of birth: 5 March 1975 (age 51)
- Place of birth: Derby, England
- Height: 5 ft 6 in (1.68 m)
- Position: Midfielder

Team information
- Current team: New Zealand U17 (head coach)

Senior career*
Years	Team	Apps	(Gls)
1992–1993	Eastwood Town	?	(?)
1993–2001	Barnsley	185	(4)
2000	→ Port Vale (loan)	6	(1)
2001–2005	Blackpool	153	(4)
2005–2007	Macclesfield Town	83	(11)
2007–2008	Wycombe Wanderers	25	(0)
2009–2012	Waitakere United	33	(0)
Total		485	(20)

International career
1996	England U21	1	(0)

Managerial career
- 2020–: New Zealand U17
- * Club domestic league appearances and goals

Martin John Bullock (born 5 March 1975) is an English former professional footballer and manager who is the head coach of the New Zealand U17 team and a Football Development Officer at the Northern Football Federation. He previously played for five league teams over 15 years, making 452 league appearances. He also won a cap for the England under-21 side in 1996.

Bullock played as a midfielder and began his career at non-League Eastwood Town before earning a move to Barnsley in 1993. In an eight-year association with the club he played almost 200 league games for the club, helping them to the Premier League at the end of the 1996–97 season. Loaned out to Port Vale in 2000, the following year he transferred to Blackpool. He enjoyed a highly successful four years with the club, lifting the Football League Trophy in 2002 and 2004. He then played for Macclesfield Town between 2005 and 2007 before ending his professional career with Wycombe Wanderers in 2008. He later turned out for leading New Zealand side Waitakere United, helping them to three Premiership titles before his retirement in June 2012.

== Club career ==
Bullock began his career with Northern Premier League First Division side Eastwood Town. He turned professional after a £15,000 move to Barnsley in 1993. He remained at Oakwell for eight years, making 218 appearances in all competitions for the "Tykes". He played 28 league games, mostly as a substitute, in the club's historic 1996–97 campaign, which saw them finish second in the First Division. In the subsequent 1997–98 Premier League season he played 33 top-flight games. Barnsley were relegated, though Bullock remained a key part of their 1998–99 campaign. He found himself out of favour in 1999–2000, however, making just six starts, five of which were in the League Cup. He was utilised more frequently in 2000–01, after spending February 2000 on loan at Second Division Port Vale, for whom he scored once against Queens Park Rangers.

In September 2001, he joined Steve McMahon's Second Division newcomers Blackpool on a free transfer. He became a key player for the club, making 43 league appearances in his maiden season there. His contribution was particularly telling in the semi-final of the Football League Trophy, as he scored the golden goal winner against Huddersfield Town that ensured the club a date at the Millennium Stadium. He went on to play the full ninety minutes of the club's triumph over Cambridge United in the final.

He enjoyed a similarly successful campaign in 2002–03 and was offered a two-year contract extension in March 2003. He was later named in the PFA Second Division Team of the Year for his performances throughout the season. The 2003–04 campaign was also memorable for Bullock, as he helped Blackpool to lift the League Trophy for the second time in three seasons, following victory over Southend United. He made a further 28 league appearances for the club in 2004–05. The new boss Colin Hendry told him he would not be offered a new contract. He signed for Brian Horton's Macclesfield Town in June 2005. In his first season with the club he made 40 appearances in League Two. He made a further 43 appearances in his second season at Moss Rose. In May 2007, he switched clubs to Wycombe Wanderers, penning a two-year deal. He made 27 appearances in all competitions for the club in 2007–08, before he announced his retirement from the professional game in May 2008.

In 2009, he made a late move to New Zealand to play for Waitakere United. Following a second-place finish in 2009–10, Waitakere went on to reach the final of the OFC Champions League, and Bullock played both games of the 4–2 aggregate defeat to Papua New Guinea side Hekari United. Waitakere went on to win the championship in 2010–11 after defeating rivals Auckland City. They retained their title in 2011–12 with a 4–1 win over Team Wellington. He retired at the age of 37 in June 2012.

== International career ==
Whilst with Barnsley, Bullock won a cap for the England under-21 side in 1996.

== Coaching career ==
Bullock was appointed head coach of the New Zealand U17 team and a Football Development Officer at the Northern Football Federation in March 2020. In December 2024, he became the first coach in Oceania to complete his assessment and achieve the OFC/NZF Pro Licence coaching diploma.

== Career statistics ==
Appearances and goals by club, season and competition
Club	Season	League			FA Cup		Other		Total	
Club	Season	Division	Apps	Goals	Apps	Goals	Apps	Goals	Apps	Goals
Barnsley	1993–94	First Division	0	0	0	0	1	0	1	0
Barnsley	1994–95	First Division	29	0	1	0	1	0	31	0
Barnsley	1995–96	First Division	41	1	2	0	3	0	46	1
Barnsley	1996–97	First Division	28	0	2	1	2	0	32	1
Barnsley	1997–98	Premier League	33	0	5	0	2	0	40	0
Barnsley	1998–99	First Division	32	2	5	2	5	0	42	2
Barnsley	1999–2000	First Division	4	0	0	0	5	0	9	0
Barnsley	2000–01	First Division	18	1	0	0	0	0	18	1
Barnsley	Total		185	4	15	3	19	0	219	7
Port Vale (loan)	1999–2000	First Division	6	1	0	0	0	0	6	1
Blackpool	2001–02	Second Division	43	2	4	0	8	3	55	5
Blackpool	2002–03	Second Division	38	1	3	0	2	0	43	1
Blackpool	2003–04	Second Division	44	1	3	0	10	0	57	1
Blackpool	2004–05	League One	28	0	1	0	1	0	30	0
Blackpool	Total		153	4	11	0	21	3	185	7
Macclesfield Town	2005–06	League Two	40	7	2	0	6	1	48	8
Macclesfield Town	2006–07	League Two	43	4	4	0	0	0	47	4
Macclesfield Town	Total		83	11	6	0	6	1	95	12
Wycombe Wanderers	2007–08	League Two	25	0	1	0	1	0	27	0
Waitakere United	2009–10	NZ Premiership	13	0	—		11 (Note: Eight appearances; one goal in OFC Champions League; three appearances in New Zealand Football Championship play-offs)	1	24	1
Waitakere United	2010–11	NZ Premiership	6	0	—		6 (Note: Three appearances in OFC Champions League; three appearances in New Zealand Football Championship play-offs)	0	9	0
Waitakere United	2011–12	NZ Premiership	14	0	—		9 (Note: Five appearances in OFC Champions League; three appearances in New Zealand Football Championship play-offs; one appearance in Charity Cup)	0	23	0
Waitakere United	Total		33	0	0	0	26	1	59	1
Career total			485	20	33	3	73	5	591	28

== Honours ==
Barnsley

- Football League First Division second-place promotion: 1996–97

Blackpool

- Football League Trophy: 2001–02, 2003–04

Waitakere United

- New Zealand Football Championship: 2010–11, 2011–12
- OFC Champions League runner-up: 2010

Individual

- PFA Team of the Year: 2002–03 Second Division
