= 2001–02 Burnley F.C. season =

English football club season

Burnley
2001–02 season
- Chairman: Barry Kilby
- Manager: Stan Ternent
- First Division: 7th
- FA Cup: Fourth round
- League Cup: First round
- Top goalscorer: League: Gareth Taylor (16); All: Gareth Taylor (16)
- Highest home attendance: 21,823 v Wolverhampton Wanderers (30 March 2002)
- Lowest home attendance: 4,398 v Rushden & Diamonds (21 August 2001)
- Average home league attendance: 15,948

The 2001–02 season was Burnley's 2nd season in the second tier of English football. They were managed by Stan Ternent in his fourth full season since he replaced Chris Waddle at the beginning 1998–99 campaign.

== Appearances and goals ==
No.	Pos	Nat	Player	Total		First Division		League Cup		FA Cup	
No.	Pos	Nat	Player	Apps	Goals	Apps	Goals	Apps	Goals	Apps	Goals
1	GK	(Greece) GRE	Nikolaos Michopoulos	36	0	33+0	0	1+0	0	2+0	0
2	DF	(England) ENG	Dean West	46	0	43+1	0	0+0	0	2+0	0
3	DF	(England) ENG	Mitchell Thomas	12	0	10+2	0	0+0	0	0+0	0
4	MF	(England) ENG	Kevin Ball	45	0	37+5	0	1+0	0	2+0	0
5	DF	(England) ENG	Steve Davis	24	1	22+1	1	1+0	0	0+0	0
6	DF	(England) ENG	Gordon Armstrong	18	2	11+7	2	0+0	0	0+0	0
7	MF	(England) ENG	Glen Little	40	10	31+6	9	0+1	0	2+0	1
8	MF	(England) ENG	Paul Cook	30	5	25+3	5	0+1	0	0+1	0
9	FW	(Wales) WAL	Gareth Taylor	43	16	35+5	16	1+0	0	2+0	0
10	FW	(England) ENG	Andy Payton	17	4	0+17	4	0+0	0	0+0	0
11	MF	(England) ENG	Lenny Johnrose	6	0	0+6	0	0+0	0	0+0	0
12	MF	(England) ENG	John Mullin	5	0	0+4	0	1+0	0	0+0	0
12	MF	(England) ENG	Tony Grant	30	0	26+2	0	0+0	0	2+0	0
14	DF	(Trinidad and Tobago) TRI	Ian Cox	37	2	32+2	2	1+0	0	2+0	0
15	MF	(England) ENG	Graham Branch	11	0	8+2	0	0+0	0	1+0	0
16	FW	(England) ENG	Ian Moore	49	14	41+5	11	0+1	0	2+0	3
17	FW	(England) ENG	Anthony Shandran	0	0	0+0	0	0+0	0	0+0	0
18	MF	(England) ENG	Paul Weller	39	2	29+9	2	0+0	0	0+1	0
19	DF	(England) ENG	Lee Briscoe	46	5	43+1	5	0+0	0	2+0	0
20	MF	(England) ENG	Brad Maylett	12	0	0+10	0	1+0	0	0+1	0
21	FW	(England) ENG	Mark Rasmussen	0	0	0+0	0	0+0	0	0+0	0
22	DF	(England) ENG	John Williamson	0	0	0+0	0	0+0	0	0+0	0
23	DF	(England) ENG	Mark McGregor	3	0	1+0	0	1+1	0	0+0	0
24	GK	(Greece) GRE	Luigi Cennamo	1	0	0+0	0	0+0	0	0+1	0
26	DF	(Ivory Coast) CIV	Arthur Gnohéré	37	3	31+3	3	1+0	0	2+0	0
27	FW	(England) ENG	Robbie Blake	10	0	1+9	0	0+0	0	0+0	0
28	MF	(Republic of Ireland) IRL	Alan Moore	32	6	23+6	3	1+	2	2+0	1
29	FW	(Greece) GRE	Dimitrios Papadopoulos	7	0	0+5	0	1+0	0	0+1	0
30	FW	(England) ENG	Tony Ellis	10	1	0+10	1	0+0	0	0+0	0
31	GK	(England) ENG	Marlon Beresford (on loan)	13	0	13+0	0	0+0	0	0+0	0
33	FW	(Jamaica) JAM	David Johnson (on loan)	8	5	8+0	5	0+0	0	0+0	0
34	MF	(England) ENG	Paul Gascoigne	6	0	3+3	0	0+0	0	0+0	0

== Transfers ==
=== In ===
#	Pos	Player	From	Fee	Date
9	FW	(Wales) Gareth Taylor	Manchester City	Free	22 June 2001
23	DF	(England) Mark McGregor	Wrexham	Free	10 July 2001
24	GK	(Greece) Luigi Cennamo	Olympiacos	Free	10 July 2001
29	FW	(Greece) Dimitrios Papadopoulos	Akratitos	£500k	24 July 2001
30	FW	(England) Tony Ellis	Rochdale	Free	26 July 2001
26	DF	(Ivory Coast) Arthur Gnohéré	Caen	Free	1 August 2001
28	MF	(Republic of Ireland) Alan Moore	Middlesbrough	Free	7 August 2001
12	MF	(England) Tony Grant	Manchester City	£250k	11 October 2001
27	FW	(England) Robbie Blake	Bradford City	£1m	25 January 2002
31	GK	(England) Marlon Beresford	Middlesbrough	Loan	31 January 2002
33	FW	(Jamaica) David Johnson	Nottingham Forest	Loan	12 March 2002
34	MF	(England) Paul Gascoigne	Everton	Free	17 March 2002

=== Out ===
#	Pos	Player	To	Fee	Date
	DF	(England) John Boardman		Released	8 May 2001
	DF	(England) Chris Scott	Leigh RMI	Free	8 May 2001
	DF	(England) Michael Devenney		Released	8 May 2001
	FW	(England) Ronnie Jepson		Retired	1 June 2001
	GK	(England) Paul Crichton	Norwich City	£150k	23 June 2001
	MF	(England) John Mullin	Rotherham United	£150k	4 October 2001
	MF	(England) Paul Smith	Hartlepool United	Free	3 November 2001
	MF	(England) Alex Kevan	Hereford United	Free	17 November 2001
8	MF	(England) Paul Cook	Wigan Athletic	Loan	1 December 2001
10	FW	(England) Andy Payton	Blackpool	Loan	4 December 2001
17	FW	(England) Anthony Shandran	St Patrick's Athletic	Loan	28 January 2002
17	FW	(England) Anthony Shandran	Stalybridge Celtic	Loan	26 March 2002

== Matches ==
=== First Division ===
12 August 2001
6:15pm

Sheffield Wednesday	0–2	Burnley
	(Report)	Taylor 57'; Cook 79' (pen.)

Hillsborough, Sheffield
Attendance: 21,766 (2,325 away)
Referee: P Dowd

18 August 2001
3:00pm

Burnley	3–2	Wimbledon
A. Moore 12'; Cook 31' (pen.); Armstrong 40'	(Report)	Nielsen 10'; Shipperley 65'

Turf Moor, Burnley
Attendance: 14,473 (307 away)
Referee: M Jones

25 August 2001
3:00pm

Millwall	0–2	Burnley
	(Report)	I. Moore 63'; A. Moore 68'

The New Den, London
Attendance: 11,903 (1,010 away)
Referee: D Pugh

27 August 2001
6:15pm

Burnley	2–4	Manchester City
Davis 25'; Briscoe 52'	(Report)	Goater 17' 62' 86'; Wanchope 50'

Turf Moor, Burnley
Attendance: 19,602 (3,945 away)
Referee: C Wilkes

2 September 2001
3:00pm

Bradford City	2–3	Burnley
Ward 61'; McCall 81'	(Report)	Little 46' 79'; Ellis 85'

Valley Parade, Bradford
Attendance: 17,547 (3,107 away)
Referee: R Pearson

8 September 2001
3:00pm

Burnley	3–0	Rotherham United
I. Moore 48'; Weller 49'; Payton 90'	(Report)

Turf Moor, Burnley
Attendance: 14,820 (1,015 away)
Referee: M Warren

15 September 2001
3:00pm

Burnley	5–2	Walsall
Taylor 31'; I. Moore 45'; Briscoe 69' 72'; Cook 80'	(Report)	Wrack 51'; Davis 64' (o.g.)

Turf Moor, Burnley
Attendance: 14,019 (455 away)
Referee: P Prosser

18 September 2001
7:45pm

Birmingham City	2–3	Burnley
Johnson 19' 40'	(Report)	Little 10' 72'; I. Moore 34'

St Andrew's, Birmingham
Attendance: 18,426 (1,367 away)
Referee: S Mathieson

22 September 2001
3:00pm

Norwich City	2–1	Burnley
Holt 4'; Roberts 55'	(Report)	Armstrong 58'

Carrow Road, Norwich
Attendance: 19,849 (1,657 away)
Referee: P Alcock

25 September 2001
7:45pm

Burnley	3–3	Crewe Alexandra
Taylor 62'; Payton 83' (pen.) 90'	(Report)	Lunt 17'; Foster 28'; Hulse 90'

Turf Moor, Burnley
Attendance: 13,964 (289 away)
Referee: C Webster

29 September 2001
3:00pm

West Bromwich Albion	1–0	Burnley
Dobie 67'	(Report)

The Hawthorns, West Bromwich
Attendance: 21,442 (2,503 away)
Referee: A Butler

13 October 2001
3:00pm

Nottingham Forest	1–0	Burnley
Bart-Williams 42'	(Report)

City Ground, Nottingham
Attendance: 24,016 (2,523 away)
Referee: B Jordan

20 October 2001
3:00pm

Burnley	3–3	Barnsley
Morgan 23' (o.g.); Briscoe 36'; Payton 86' (pen.)	(Report)	Lumsdon 45' (pen.); Morgan 52'; Barnard 88'

Turf Moor, Burnley
Attendance: 14,690 (475 away)
Referee: G Laws

23 October 2001
7:45pm

Burnley	1–0	Crystal Palace
Cook 17'	(Report)

Turf Moor, Burnley
Attendance: 14,713 (593 away)
Referee: M Clattenburg

28 October 2001
3:00pm

Wolverhampton Wanderers	3–0	Burnley
Taylor 10' (o.g.); Rae 20'; Cameron 39'	(Report)

Molineux, Wolverhampton
Attendance: 24,893 (1,623 away)
Referee: P Joslin

30 October 2001
7:45pm

Gillingham	2–2	Burnley
Osborn 8'; Ipoua 15'	(Report)	Taylor 32'; Little 52'

Priestfield Stadium, Gillingham
Attendance: 8,067 (403 away)
Referee: C Wilkes

4 November 2001
2:15pm

Burnley	2–0	Sheffield United
Taylor 30'; Cook 33'	(Report)

Turf Moor, Burnley
Attendance: 13,166 (449 away)
Referee: S Baines

10 November 2001
3:00pm

Burnley	1–1	Portsmouth
Taylor 69'	(Report)	Crouch 72'

Turf Moor, Burnley
Attendance: 14,123 (723 away)
Referee: G Frankland

13 November 2001
7:45pm

Burnley	1–0	Watford
Little 2'	(Report)

Turf Moor, Burnley
Attendance: 13,162 (256 away)
Referee: T Parkes

17 November 2001
3:00pm

Coventry City	0–2	Burnley
	(Report)	Taylor 11'; Little 33'

Highfield Road, Coventry
Attendance: 16,849 (1,946 away)
Referee: F Stretton

23 November 2001
7:45pm

Burnley	1–0	Grimsby Town
Taylor 3'	(Report)

Turf Moor, Burnley
Attendance: 18,535 (292 away)
Referee: G Cain

1 December 2001
3:00pm

Crystal Palace	1–2	Burnley
Morrison 38'	(Report)	I. Moore 23' 63'

Selhurst Park, London
Attendance: 18,457 (1,667 away)
Referee: P Taylor

9 December 2001
1:00pm

Preston North End	2–3	Burnley
McKenna 29'; Alexander 41' (pen.)	(Report)	Gnohéré 17' 61'; Little 25'

Deepdale, Preston
Attendance: 20,370 (5,208 away)
Referee: R Pearson

15 December 2001
3:00pm

Burnley	3–2	Stockport County
Little 9' (pen.); Taylor 66'; I. Moore 70'	(Report)	McSheffrey 11'; Kuqi 90' (pen.)

Turf Moor, Burnley
Attendance: 15,526 (493 away)
Referee: A Hall

22 December 2001
3:00pm

Burnley	0–0	Millwall
	(Report)

Turf Moor, Burnley
Attendance: 16,131 (380 away)
Referee: N Barry

29 December 2001
12:00pm

Manchester City	5–1	Burnley
Wanchope 2' 28' 45'; Berkovic 38'; Huckerby 90'	(Report)	I. Moore 61'

Maine Road, Manchester
Attendance: 34,250 (2,005 away)
Referee: M Messias

12 January 2002
3:00pm

Wimbledon	0–0	Burnley
	(Report)

Selhurst Park, London
Attendance: 7,675 (1,675 away)
Referee: A Kaye

19 January 2002
3:00pm

Burnley	1–2	Sheffield Wednesday
Taylor 77' (pen.)	(Report)	McLaren 33'; Kuqi 90'

Turf Moor, Burnley
Attendance: 16,081 (1,028 away)
Referee: M Pike

3 February 2002
6:15pm

Burnley	0–2	West Bromwich Albion
	(Report)	Roberts 36' 41'

Turf Moor, Burnley
Attendance: 15,846 (1,452 away)
Referee: J Winter

6 February 2002
8:00pm

Watford	1–2	Burnley
Pennant 23'	(Report)	Cox 72'; Weller 90'

Vicarage Road, Watford
Attendance: 12,160 (915 away)
Referee: M Messias

9 February 2002
3:00pm

Barnsley	1–1	Burnley
Barnard 6'	(Report)	Taylor 38'

Oakwell, Barnsley
Attendance: 14,411 (2,439 away)
Referee: R Beeby

12 February 2002
7:45pm

Rotherham United	1–1	Burnley
Robins 12' (pen.)	(Report)	Taylor 9' (pen.)

Millmoor, Rotherham
Attendance: 9,021 (2,602 away)
Referee: J Brandwood

16 February 2002
3:00pm

Burnley	1–1	Nottingham Forest
Gnohéré 88'	(Report)	Harewood 69' (pen.)

Turf Moor, Burnley
Attendance: 15,085 (908 away)
Referee: G Frankland

23 February 2002
3:00pm

Crewe Alexandra	1–2	Burnley
Hulse 63'	(Report)	Taylor 20'; A. Moore 58'

Gresty Road, Crewe
Attendance: 6,458 (1,923 away)
Referee: P Rejer

26 February 2002
7:45pm

Burnley	0–1	Birmingham City
	(Report)	Mooney 25'

Turf Moor, Burnley
Attendance: 13,504 (760 away)
Referee: R Harris

2 March 2002
3:00pm

Burnley	1–1	Norwich City
Taylor 6'	(Report)	Libbra 55'

Turf Moor, Burnley
Attendance: 14,679 (622 away)
Referee: P Jones

5 March 2002
7:45pm

Walsall	1–0	Burnley
Marcelo 52'	(Report)

Bescot Stadium, Walsall
Attendance: 5,611 (1,111 away)
Referee: P Alcock

9 March 2002
3:00pm

Stockport County	0–2	Burnley
	(Report)	Taylor 51'; Cox 83'

Edgeley Park, Stockport
Attendance: 6,410 (2,171 away)
Referee: P Walton

17 March 2002
6:15pm

Burnley	2–1	Preston North End
I. Moore 5'; Johnson 25'	(Report)	Anderson 84'

Turf Moor, Burnley
Attendance: 18,388 (2,277 away)
Referee: P Durkin

20 March 2002
7:45pm

Burnley	1–1	Bradford City
Johnson 20'	(Report)	Jørgensen 78'

Turf Moor, Burnley
Attendance: 19,479 (1,630 away)
Referee: A Bates

23 March 2002
3:00pm

Sheffield United	3–0	Burnley
Jagielka 19' 88'; D'Jaffo 47'	(Report)

Bramall Lane, Sheffield
Attendance: 19,003
Referee: G Laws

30 March 2002
3:00pm

Burnley	2–3	Wolverhampton Wanderers
I. Moore 47'; Johnson 85'	(Report)	Sturridge 9' 26'; Cameron 45'

Turf Moor, Burnley
Attendance: 21,823 (4,031 away)
Referee: B Knight

1 April 2002
3:00pm

Portsmouth	1–1	Burnley
Todorov 75'	(Report)	Johnson 20'

Fratton Park, Portsmouth
Attendance: 18,020 (1,385 away)
Referee: S Tomlin

6 April 2002
3:00pm

Burnley	2–0	Gillingham
I. Moore 55'; Johnson 62'	(Report)

Turf Moor, Burnley
Attendance: 16,236 (511 away)
Referee: C Webster

13 April 2002
3:00pm

Grimsby Town	3–1	Burnley
Boulding 5' 43'; Allen 12'	(Report)	Briscoe 90'

Blundell Park, Grimsby
Attendance: 9,275
Referee: M Pike

21 April 2002
2:00pm

Burnley	1–0	Coventry City
Taylor 68'	(Report)

Turf Moor, Burnley
Attendance: 18,751
Referee: S Dunn

=== Final league position ===
Pos	Team	Pld	W	D	L	GF	GA	GD	Pts	Qualification or relegation
5	Birmingham City (O, P)	46	21	13	12	70	49	+21	76	Qualification for the First Division play-offs
6	Norwich City	46	22	9	15	60	51	+9	75	Qualification for the First Division play-offs
7	Burnley	46	21	12	13	70	62	+8	75	
8	Preston North End	46	20	12	14	71	59	+12	72	
9	Wimbledon	46	18	13	15	63	57	+6	67	

Rules for classification: 1) Points; 2) Goal difference; 3) Goals scored
(O) Play-off winners; (P) Promoted

=== League Cup ===
==== 1st Round ====
21 August 2001
7:45pm

Burnley	2–3	Rushden & Diamonds
A. Moore 55'; McGregor 84'	(Report)	Peters 5'; Mustafa 70'; Darby 76'

Turf Moor, Burnley
Attendance: 4,398 (202 away)
Referee: M Fletcher

=== FA Cup ===
==== 3rd Round ====
5 January 2002
3:00pm

Burnley	4–1	Canvey Island
Little 24'; I. Moore 45' 78' 84'	(Report)	Boylan 67'

Turf Moor, Burnley
Attendance: 11,496 (778 away)
Referee: D Pugh

==== 4th Round ====
27 January 2002
1:00pm

Cheltenham Town	2–1	Burnley
Milton 23'; Alsop 28'	(Report)	A. Moore 29'

Whaddon Road, Cheltenham
Attendance: 7,300 (1,896 away)
Referee: A Butler
