= Andy Payton =

English footballer (born 1967)

Personal information
- Full name: Andrew Paul Payton
- Date of birth: 23 October 1967 (age 59)
- Place of birth: Whalley, England
- Height: 5 ft 9 in (1.75 m)
- Position: Striker

Youth career
- –1985: Hull City

Senior career*
Years	Team	Apps	(Gls)
1985–1991	Hull City	143	(55)
1991–1992	Middlesbrough	19	(3)
1992–1993	Celtic	36	(15)
1993–1996	Barnsley	108	(41)
1996–1998	Huddersfield Town	43	(17)
1998–2003	Burnley	156	(68)
2001–2002	→ Blackpool (loan)	4	(1)
Total		509	(200)

Managerial career
- 2012–2013: Colne (assistant)
- 2016–2017: Padiham (assistant)
- 2017–2018: Northwich Victoria (assistant)
- 2019: Garstang
- * Club domestic league appearances and goals as of 2006-10-15

Andrew Paul Payton (born 23 October 1967) is an English former professional footballer. A striker, Payton played for seven professional clubs in England and Scotland, scoring 200 goals in over 500 appearances, and gaining the nickname the Padiham Predator.

== Playing career ==
After being released by hometown club Burnley at the age of 15, Payton began his career as an apprentice at Hull City, signing a professional contract in 1985. He joined Middlesbrough for £700,000 in November 1991, which remained Hull's record sale for 15 years, before signing for Celtic in August 1992. After a year at Celtic, he returned to England to play for Barnsley. In 1996 Huddersfield Town signed him for £325,000, before selling him to Burnley as part of a swap deal with Paul Barnes in 1998. After five years at Burnley, including a loan spell at Blackpool where he scored once against Bury, he ended his career in non-league football with Stalybridge Celtic and then Colne.

== Coaching career ==
After retiring from playing, Payton gained a UEFA A Coaching License and coached at Colne, Padiham and Northwich Victoria. He was appointed manager of Garstang in May 2019, but left the club in August.

== Career statistics ==
Appearances and goals by club, season and competition
Club	Season	League			National cup		League cup		Other		Total	
Club	Season	Division	Apps	Goals	Apps	Goals	Apps	Goals	Apps	Goals	Apps	Goals
Hull City	1986–87	Second Division	2	0	0	0	0	0	0	0	2	0
Hull City	1987–88	Second Division	21	2	3	0	1	0	0	0	25	2
Hull City	1988–89	Second Division	28	4	3	0	2	0	0	0	33	4
Hull City	1989–90	Second Division	39	17	1	0	2	1	1 (Note: Appearances in Full Members Cup)	0	43	18
Hull City	1990–91	Second Division	43	25	1	0	3	0	1	0	48	25
Hull City	1991–92	Third Division	10	7	—		3	1	1 (Note: Appearances in Football League Trophy)	0	14	8
Hull City	Total		143	55	8	0	11	2	3	0	165	57
Middlesbrough	1991–92	Second Division	19	3	4	0	—		—		23	3
Celtic	1992–93	Scottish Premier Division	29	13	2	0	3	2	1 (Note: Appearances in UEFA Cup)	0	35	15
Celtic	1993–94	Scottish Premier Division	7	2	—		2	3	2	0	11	5
Celtic	Total		36	15	2	0	5	5	3	0	46	20
Barnsley	1993–94	First Division	25	12	4	1	—		—		29	13
Barnsley	1994–95	First Division	43	12	1	0	4	0	—		48	12
Barnsley	1995–96	First Division	40	16	2	0	3	3	—		45	19
Barnsley	Total		108	40	7	1	7	3	—		122	44
Huddersfield Town	1996–97	First Division	38	17	2	0	5	2	—		45	19
Huddersfield Town	1997–98	First Division	5	0	—		2	1	—		7	1
Huddersfield Town	Total		43	17	2	0	7	3	—		52	20
Burnley	1997–98	Second Division	19	9	—		—		5	3	24	12
Burnley	1998–99	Second Division	40	19	1	2	1	1	0	0	42	22
Burnley	1999–2000	Second Division	41	27	4	0	1	0	1	0	47	27
Burnley	2000–01	First Division	40	9	2	1	4	5	—		46	15
Burnley	2001–02	First Division	15	4	0	0	0	0	—		15	4
Burnley	2002–03	First Division	1	0	1	0	0	0	—		2	0
Burnley	Total		156	68	8	3	6	6	6	3	176	80
Blackpool (loan)	2001–02	Second Division	4	1	—		—		—		4	1
Career total			509	200	31	4	36	19	12	3	588	226
