= Brian Redfearn =

English footballer (1935–2019)

Personal information
- Date of birth: 20 February 1935
- Place of birth: Bradford, England
- Date of death: 10 August 2019 (aged 84)
- Height: 6 ft 1 in (1.85 m)
- Position: Midfielder

Senior career*
| Years | Team | Apps | (Gls) |
| 1952–1958 | Bradford Park Avenue | 130 | (32) |
| 1958–1959 | Blackburn Rovers | 0 | (0) |
| 1959–1961 | Darlington | 49 | (15) |
| 1961–1963 | Halifax Town | 67 | (10) |
| 1963–1964 | Bradford City | 7 | (2) |
- Buxton
- * Club domestic league appearances and goals

Brian Redfearn (20 February 1935 – 10 August 2019) was an English professional footballer who played for Bradford Park Avenue, Blackburn Rovers, Darlington, Halifax Town, Bradford City and non-League Buxton. He was the father of footballer Neil Redfearn. In 1964 Redfearn was forced to retire from professional football due to an ankle injury.

== Playing career ==
=== Bradford Park Avenue ===
Redfearn began his career at Bradford Park Avenue in 1952. He played a total of 130 games for the other team in Bradford and scored 32 goals. In 1958 he transferred to Blackburn Rovers but Park Avenue refused to pay him his £500 compensation so Blackburn ended up paying him the £500. 45 years later, his son, Neil Redfearn signed for Park Avenue and played his 1,000th career game for them.

=== Blackburn Rovers ===
Despite being on Blackburn's books for a year from December 1957, Redfearn never played a game for Blackburn and transferred to Darlington in 1959.

=== Darlington ===
Redfearn played 49 games for Darlington and he scored 15 goals. After a total of two years at Darlington, Redfearn transferred to Halifax Town in June 1961 following his relatively successful spell for 'The Darlings'.

=== Halifax Town ===
Redfearn was signed by Halifax Town by iconic manager Harry Hooper in June 1961. and played 67 games and scored 10 goals between 1961 and 1963. His son, Neil Redfearn, was to play and be in caretaker charge (twice) or Halifax Town 40 years later in 2001 and 2002 continuing the proud family connection to 'The Shaymen'. In 1963 Redfearn transferred to Bradford City.

=== Bradford City ===
Redfearn played 7 games and scored 2 goals. He retired from professional football and signed for non-league Buxton in 1964. His son, Neil Redfearn, played for Bradford City between 1999 and 2000.

== Personal life and death ==
Redfearn was married to Joy and was father to Tina and Neil. He died on 10 August 2019, at the age of 84.
