= 1986–87 Watford F.C. season =

English football team season

Watford
1986–87 season
- Chairman: Elton John
- Manager: Graham Taylor
- Stadium: Vicarage Road
- First Division: 9th
- FA Cup: Semi-final (eliminated by Tottenham Hotspur)
- League Cup: Third round (eliminated by West Ham United)
- Full Members' Cup: Third round (eliminated by Manchester City)

The 1986–87 season was Watford's 106th season in existence, and their fifth season in the First Division, following promotion in the 1981–82 season, in which they finished 9th. Along with the First Division, they competed in the FA Cup and Football League Cup, being eliminated in the semi-final and third round respectively.

== Competitions ==
=== First Division ===
==== League table ====
Pos	Team	Pld	W	D	L	GF	GA	GD	Pts	Qualification or relegation
7	Luton Town	42	18	12	12	47	45	+2	66	
8	Nottingham Forest	42	18	11	13	64	51	+13	65	
9	Watford	42	18	9	15	67	54	+13	63	
10	Coventry City (Note: Coventry City would have qualified as FA Cup winners.)	42	17	12	13	50	45	+5	63	Disqualified from the European Cup Winners' Cup
11	Manchester United	42	14	14	14	52	45	+7	56	

Source: World Football
Rules for classification: 1) Points; 2) Goal difference; 3) Goals scored

==== Matches ====
First Division match results
Date	Opponent	Venue	Result F–A	Scorers	Attendance
23 August 1986	Oxford United	H	3–0	Barnes, Bardsley, Blissett	17,720
26 August 1986	Queens Park Rangers	A	2–3	Talbot, Barnes	14,021
30 August 1986	Nottingham Forest	A	1–1	Blissett	14,723
6 September 1986	Wimbledon	H	0–1		14,822
13 September 1986	Norwich City	A	3–1	Richardson, Sterling, Blissett	15,487
16 September 1986	Manchester United	H	1–0	Roberts	21,650
20 September 1986	Sheffield Wednesday	H	0–1		14,329
27 September 1986	Coventry City	A	0–1		11,058
4 October 1986	West Ham United	H	2–2	Callaghan, Blissett	17,120
11 October 1986	Arsenal	A	1–3	Falco	24,076
18 October 1986	Aston Villa	H	4–2	Falco (3), Jackett	16,414
25 October 1986	Everton	A	2–3	Jackett (pen.), Mountfield (o.g.)	28,577
1 November 1986	Chelsea	A	0–0		13,334
8 November 1986	Charlton Athletic	H	4–1	Falco (2), Bardsley, Blissett	14,466
15 November 1986	Newcastle United	A	2–2	Jackett (pen.), Blissett	23,645
22 November 1986	Leicester City	H	5–1	Rostron, Barnes, Callaghan, Jackett (pen.), Falco	13,605
29 November 1986	Southampton	A	1–3	Terry	14,537
6 December 1986	Liverpool	H	2–0	McClelland, Barnes	23,954
13 December 1986	Tottenham Hotspur	A	1–2	Falco	23,137
19 December 1986	Norwich City	H	1–1	Barnes	12,900
26 December 1986	Luton Town	A	2–0	Porter, Richardson	11,140
27 December 1986	Newcastle United	H	1–0	Barnes	18,011
1 January 1987	Manchester City	H	1–1	Barnes	15,514
3 January 1987	Wimbledon	A	1–2	Porter	8,063
24 January 1987	Oxford United	A	3–1	Callaghan, Barnes, Falco	9,710
7 February 1987	Nottingham Forest	H	1–1	Barnes	15,173
14 February 1987	Manchester United	A	1–3	Jackett	35,763
28 February 1987	Sheffield Wednesday	A	1–0	Blissett	20,530
8 March 1987	Everton	H	2–1	Blissett, Falco	14,014
21 March 1987	Arsenal	H	2–0	Porter, Blissett	18,172
25 March 1987	Aston Villa	A	1–1	Falco	12,575
28 March 1987	West Ham United	A	0–1		16,485
4 April 1987	Charlton Athletic	A	3–4	Falco, Sims (pen.), Blissett	4,958
6 April 1987	Queens Park Rangers	H	0–3		13,839
14 April 1987	Chelsea	H	3–1	Bardsley, Porter, Bissett	14,108
18 April 1987	Manchester City	A	2–1	Sterling, Bardsley	18,541
21 April 1987	Luton Town	H	2–0	Sterling, Barnes	14,650
25 April 1987	Leicester City	A	2–1	Sterling, Bardsley	9,448
30 April 1987	Coventry City	H	2–3	Falco (2)	11,590
2 May 1987	Southampton	H	1–1	Terry	13,067
4 May 1987	Liverpool	A	0–1		40,150
9 May 1987	Tottenham Hotspur	H	1–0	Jackett (pen.)	20,024

=== FA Cup ===
FA Cup match results
Round	Date	Opponent	Venue	Result F–A	Scorers	Attendance
Third round	10 January 1987	Maidstone United	H	3–1	Falco (2), Allen	15,952
Fourth round	1 February 1987	Chelsea	H	1–0	Blissett	18,832
Fifth round	21 February 1987	Walsall	A	1–1	Bardsley	15,621
Fifth round replay	24 February 1987	Walsall	H	4–4 (a.e.t.)	Jackett (pen.), Blissett, Barnes (2)	20,350
Fifth round, second replay	2 March 1987	Walsall	A	1–0	Dornan (o.g.)	15,897
Sixth round	14 March 1987	Arsenal	A	3–1	Blissett (2), Barnes	43,276
Semi-final	11 April 1987	Tottenham Hotspur	N	1–4	Allen	46,161

=== League Cup ===
League Cup match results
Round	Date	Opponent	Venue	Result F–A	Scorers	Attendance
Second round, first leg	23 September 1986	Rochdale	H	1–1	Roston	9,670
Second round, second leg	7 October 1986	Rochdale	A	2–1	Barnes, Jackett	5,449
Third round	29 October 1986	West Ham United	H	2–3	Jackett (pen.), Bardsley	17,523

=== Full Members' Cup ===
Full Members' Cup match results
Round	Date	Opponent	Venue	Result F–A	Scorers	Attendance
Third round	26 November 1986	Manchester City	A	0–1		6,393
