= Nicky Eaden =

English footballer (born 1972)

Personal information
- Full name: Nicholas Jeremy Eaden
- Date of birth: 12 December 1972 (age 53)
- Place of birth: Sheffield, England
- Height: 5 ft 9 in (1.75 m)
- Position: Full-back

Team information
- Current team: Barnsley (senior professional development coach)

Youth career
- Barnsley

Senior career*
Years	Team	Apps	(Gls)
1992–2000	Barnsley	293	(10)
2000–2002	Birmingham City (Note: Soccerbase attributes Birmingham's goal against Portsmouth in October 2000 to Eaden, where other sources, e.g. the English National Football Archive, Tony Matthews' Birmingham City Complete Record and the BBC match report give it to Dele Adebola.)	74	(3)
2002	→ Wigan Athletic (loan)	5	(0)
2002–2005	Wigan Athletic	117	(0)
2005–2007	Nottingham Forest	28	(0)
2006	→ Lincoln City (loan)	17	(0)
2007	→ Lincoln City (loan)	16	(0)
2007	Halesowen Town	1	(0)
2007	Solihull Moors	1	(0)
2007–2009	Kettering Town (Note: The Kettering Town appearances and goals only include the 2008–09 and 2009–10 seasons in the Conference National, not the 2007–08 season in the Conference North, which Soccerbase does not cover.)	28	(0)
Total		580	(13)

Managerial career
- 2016: Rotherham United (caretaker)
- 2018: Nuneaton Borough
- 2018–2019: Hednesford Town
- 2019: Kettering Town
- * Club domestic league appearances and goals

Nicholas Jeremy Eaden (born 12 December 1972) is an English football coach and former professional footballer, he is a senior professional development coach at EFL League One side Barnsley.

As a player he was as a full-back who accumulated 550 appearances in the Football League. He was part of the Barnsley team who played in the Premier League during the 1997–98 season. He also won promotions to the top flight with both Birmingham City and Wigan Athletic, also playing professionally for Nottingham Forest and Lincoln City. He rounded his career off with spells with non-league sides Halesowen Town, Solihull Moors and Kettering Town.

Eaden moved into coaching during his final playing stint with Kettering and was appointed assistant manager, a position he also held at Peterborough United and Rotherham United. He has also held various coaching positions at Leicester City, Tamworth, Coventry City and Chesterfield, as well as spells as manager of non-league sides Nuneaton Borough, Hednesford Town and Kettering Town.

== Playing career ==
Eaden was born in Sheffield, and began his playing career with Barnsley as a youngster. He was initially not taken on when he left school in 1989, but was given a deal later that year, and turned professional in 1991. Manager Mel Machin was critical of the player, and listed him among the players to be released at the end of the 1992–93 season. However, he gave Eaden his club and Football League debut as a substitute away to Brentford on 1 May. Four days later, Machin pre-empted the board's rumoured intention of sacking him by resigning. Eaden started the last match of the season, and the decision to release him was reversed on the recommendation of coach Eric Winstanley.

Under the management of Viv Anderson and Danny Wilson, Eaden became a regular in the side and contributed to their promotion to the Premiership, but after Barnsley would not meet his wage demands when his contract was due to expire in 2000, he left. A proposed move to Bolton Wanderers in late 1999 did not materialise, and Eaden joined First Division club Birmingham City in July 2000 on a free transfer under the Bosman ruling. While at Birmingham he played in the 2001 Football League Cup Final and made 29 league appearances in the 2001–02 season as Birmingham were promoted to the Premier League via the play-offs.

Eaden also had a successful spell with Wigan Athletic, winning promotion from the Second Division and then into the Premier League.

He joined Nottingham Forest in 2005. Despite being successful with most of his previous clubs, manager Colin Calderwood did not include him in the first matchday squad in the 2006–07 season after an indifferent debut season in the East Midlands, although he had been promoted with every club he had been at prior to joining Forest.

On 31 August 2006, Eaden joined League Two side Lincoln City on loan, initially for a month, which was later extended to the maximum 93-day total. He then returned to Forest, but was again loaned to Lincoln in January 2007, this time for the rest of the season.

Released by Forest, Eaden signed for Halesowen Town of the Southern League, making just one appearance. He signed for Solihull Moors of the Conference North in September 2007, and again made a single appearance before leaving, this time for divisional rivals Kettering Town, for whom he made his debut in a 1–1 draw away to Nuneaton Borough on 20 October.

== Coaching career ==
Eaden, initially a player-coach at Kettering, became assistant to manager Mark Cooper after the 2008–09 season. In November 2009, Cooper was appointed manager of Championship club Peterborough United, and Eaden accompanied him, again as assistant manager. A year later, he left the club by mutual consent.

On 22 March 2011, Eaden joined the coaching staff of Rotherham United on a contract until the end of the season, working under his one-time Barnsley teammate Andy Liddell. After Liddell lost out to Andy Scott for the full-time manager's role at the club, Eaden departed at the end of his contract, but was quickly back in work agreeing a two-year contract to become assistant manager to Marcus Law at Tamworth. However, just a week later Eaden announced he had "had a change of heart" and would not be taking up the post, instead taking up the same role at Kettering Town.

During the 2012–13 season, Eaden worked alongside Steve Beaglehole for Leicester City under-21s as a coach, and was named on the bench for a game against Huddersfield Town as one of three over-aged players. He left in 2016 to join Rotherham United as assistant manager to Neil Redfearn, and signed a contract until the end of the 2017–18 season. Five days later, Redfearn was dismissed, and Eaden took on the role of caretaker manager. Before their next match, Rotherham appointed Neil Warnock as manager; Eaden was kept on the staff as first-team coach, but had little input to the first team. After Alan Stubbs' appointment as manager at the start of June, Eaden left the club by mutual consent.

In July 2016, Eaden was appointed as senior development coach at Coventry City under Tony Mowbray. He also briefly acted as first-team coach under Mark Venus's caretaker managership, before leaving in September 2017 to become Jack Lester's assistant manager at Chesterfield. Lester and his staff left the club after Chesterfield were relegated from the Football League at the end of the 2017–18 season.

National League North club Nuneaton Borough appointed Eaden as manager on 15 June 2018. He left the club on 22 November 2018. The following month he was appointed manager of Hednesford Town of the Northern Premier League. He left the club in April 2019. In June 2019 he was appointed manager of National League North club Kettering Town, but was sacked in September.

In August 2022, after spending a year coaching at Jamaican club Mount Pleasant, Eaden returned to Barnsley as senior professional development coach.

== Honours ==
Barnsley

- Football League First Division second-place promotion: 1996–97

Birmingham City

- Football League Cup runner-up: 2000–01

Wigan Athletic

- Football League Championship second-place promotion: 2004–05
- Football League Second Division: 2002–03

Kettering Town

- Conference North: 2007–08

Individual

- PFA Team of the Year: 1996–97 First Division, 2002–03 Second Division
