= Karl Rose =

English footballer and manager

Personal information
- Date of birth: 12 October 1978 (age 48)
- Place of birth: Barnsley, England
- Position: Striker

Team information
- Current team: Wombwell Town (manager)

Senior career*
Years	Team	Apps	(Gls)
1995–2000	Barnsley	18	(3)
1999	→Mansfield Town (loan)	1	(1)
2001–2002	Rochdale	1	(0)
2001–2004	Scarborough	65	(26)
2004–2005	Leigh RMI	20	(18)
2005–2006	Tamworth	5	(3)
2006	Arnold Town	15	(11)
2006	Garforth Town	?	(?)
2006–2007	Hednesford Town	?	(?)
2007–2012	Goole	?	(?)

Managerial career
- 2009–2012: Goole
- 2012–2016: Frickley Athletic
- 2017: Frickley Athletic
- 2017–2018: Goole
- 2018–: Wombwell Town
- * Club domestic league appearances and goals as of 15:20, 22 September 2007 (UTC)

Karl Rose (born 12 October 1978) is an English former professional footballer who played as a striker. He is the chairman and manager of Wombwell Town who play in the Northern Counties East League.

== Playing career ==
Rose began his playing career in the Football League with Barnsley, where he was tipped to go to the top following several youth international honours. However following his initial break through into the first team his career was blighted by a serious knee injury resulting in over 20 operations. Following his release from Barnsley against medical advice Rose resurrected his career with brief spells at Mansfield and Rochdale before finally moving to Scarborough. During his spell at Scarborough under Russell Slade he became a fans favourite and was key part in the 2004 FA Cup run where he scored the winning against Doncaster Rovers which featured on BBC Match of the Day. The cup run ended when Premier League Chelsea knocked the Sea Dogs out with a 1–0 win at the sold-out McCain Stadium. He went on to play for Leigh RMI, Tamworth, Arnold Town, Garforth Town, Hednesford Town and Goole.

== Managerial career ==
Whilst a player at the club Rose began his managerial career at Goole, where he spent three years as manager taking them to their highest finish for 12 seasons, before becoming manager of Frickley Athletic. Rose managed the South Emsall club for five seasons winning the Sheffield Senior cup on fur occasions and leading them to the heights of a seventh-place finish, their highest since the mid 1980s. He was replaced by Lee Morris on 2 September 2016. Rose was resigned by Frickley Athletic on 27 March 2017, and left again on 9 May 2017. He left Goole at the end of the 2017–18 season.

As of the 2018–19 season, he is the chairman and manager of Wombwell Town. They are a club formed by Rose in 2018 and in their first season won Division Two of the Sheffield & Hallamshire County Senior Football League. The next two seasons were deemed null and void due the COVID-19 pandemic, however Rose guided the club to the Sheffield and Hallamshire County Senior Division One title and then in the 2022–23 season gained promotion into the North East Counties Division One league at the first time of asking.

== Child sex abuse conviction ==
In December 2002, Rose was charged with raping a girl under 16 years of age; he denied the allegations. Rose received six charges of indecent assault, one charge of rape and one charge of a serious sexual assault, all of which he denied. Rose pled that he did not know the girl was underage as she had told him she was 16 years old; the court accepted the plea. Rose was sentenced to four months in prison after admitting to having sex with the girl, who was 14 years old.
