= Lee Butler (footballer) =

English footballer and coach

Personal information
- Full name: Lee Simon Butler
- Date of birth: 30 May 1966 (age 60)
- Place of birth: Sheffield, England
- Height: 6 ft 2 in (1.88 m)
- Position: Goalkeeper

Youth career
- 1985–1986: Harworth Colliery

Senior career*
| Years | Team | Apps | (Gls) |
| 1986–1987 | Lincoln City | 30 | (0) |
| 1986–1987 | → Boston United (loan) | 2 | (0) |
| 1987–1991 | Aston Villa | 8 | (0) |
| 1991 | → Hull City (loan) | 4 | (0) |
| 1991–1996 | Barnsley | 120 | (0) |
| 1996 | → Scunthorpe United (loan) | 2 | (0) |
| 1996–1998 | Wigan Athletic | 63 | (0) |
| 1998–1999 | Dunfermline Athletic | 35 | (0) |
| 1999–2002 | Halifax Town | 93 | (0) |
| 2002 | Doncaster Rovers | 10 | (0) |
| 2002–2003 | Halifax Town | 37 | (0) |
| 2003–2005 | Alfreton Town | 88 | (0) |
| 2005–2008 | Halifax Town | 3 | (0) |
| Total | | 495 | (0) |
- * Club domestic league appearances and goals

Lee Simon Butler (born 30 May 1966) is an English retired footballer, who was most recently goalkeeping coach at Wrexham.

The highest level of football he played was at Aston Villa, although he found his first-team appearances limited there behind first choice goalkeeper Nigel Spink.

He joined Doncaster Rovers' coaching staff in 2008 under manager, Sean O'Driscoll, remaining until dismissed by Paul Dickov in the Summer of 2013 He then joined Bradford City in July 2013. In June 2016, he left Bradford to assume a similar role at Bolton Wanderers, leaving alongside manager Phil Parkinson. On 2 November 2019 Butler once again followed Parkinson, and became Sunderland's goalkeeping coach before departing with immediate effect on 12 July 2021 to take up a similar role at Wrexham AFC.

On 24 June 2022, Butler announced his retirement from coaching.

== Honours ==
Wigan Athletic

- Football League Third Division: 1996–97
