= Andy Rammell =

English footballer

Personal information
- Full name: Andrew Victor Rammell
- Date of birth: 10 February 1967 (age 59)
- Place of birth: Nuneaton, England
- Height: 6 ft 1 in (1.85 m)
- Position: Striker

Youth career
- Atherstone United

Senior career*
Years	Team	Apps	(Gls)
1988–1989	Atherstone United		
1989–1990	Manchester United	0	(0)
1990–1996	Barnsley	185	(44)
1996–1998	Southend United	69	(13)
1998–2000	Walsall	69	(23)
2000–2003	Wycombe Wanderers	74	(25)
2003–2004	Bristol Rovers	12	(6)
2004	Forest Green Rovers	0	(0)
- * Club domestic league appearances and goals

Andrew Victor Rammell (born 10 February 1967) is an English former footballer who played as a striker for Atherstone United, Manchester United, Barnsley, Southend United, Walsall, Wycombe Wanderers, Bristol Rovers and Forest Green Rovers.

== Career ==
Born in Nuneaton, Warwickshire, Rammell began his football career with nearby Atherstone United. In 1989, following interest from league clubs such as Coventry City, Leicester City and Birmingham City, Rammell was spotted by Manchester United scout Nobby Stiles, who recommended that manager Alex Ferguson sign the 22-year-old Rammell. Ferguson travelled to Atherstone to complete the signing for a fee of £40,000. Atherstone United used the money made from Rammell's sale to Manchester United to build a stand at their home ground, which was later named the Andy Rammell Stand.

Rammell was a regular in the Manchester United reserve team, scoring seven goals in 26 appearances, but he never played a first-team game for the club and was sold to Barnsley for £100,000 in September 1990. He found his niche with Barnsley scoring 44 goals in 185 league appearances over a period of six seasons. He joined Southend United in 1996, but the team finished bottom of the league in two consecutive seasons, falling from the First Division to the Third Division. After scoring 13 goals in 69 league appearances, he moved to Second Division Walsall.

With 18 goals in his first season with Walsall, Rammell was largely responsible for the team finishing as Second Division runners-up in 1998–99 and securing promotion to the First Division. He also played a part in Walsall's run to the Southern Area Final of the 1998–99 Football League Trophy, scoring in the area semi-final against Cambridge United. However, his performance dropped off in 1999–2000, and he scored just five goals in 30 league appearances as Walsall finished in 22nd place and were relegated back to the Second Division. Although Rammell earned legendary status amongst Walsall fans after scoring the winning goals against local rivals Wolves, West Bromwich Albion and Birmingham City

A move to Wycombe Wanderers followed in September 2000, with Rammell's 10 goals in 2000–01 keeping the team afloat in mid-table; however, it was his two goals in the FA Cup that proved most valuable as Wycombe went on a run to the semi-finals before losing to Liverpool. He scored another 11 league goals the following season, as well as another two in the FA Cup, but Wycombe were unable to repeat the feats of the previous season, losing to Fulham after a replay in the third round.

In 2002–03, Rammell scored just four league goals for Wycombe, all of them coming before the turn of the year, and in March 2003, he was allowed to move to Third Division Bristol Rovers. With four goals in three matches at the end of the season, he helped the club narrowly avoid relegation out of The Football League. The following season would prove to be Rammell's last as a footballer; his participation in matches was limited apart from a brief flurry of action in October and November 2003, and in December 2003, he suffered from an injury to his right knee in a game against Yeovil Town. The injury forced his retirement from the professional game, and though he attempted a comeback with non-league Forest Green Rovers, he suffered a recurrence of the injury and retired completely in July 2004 at the age of 37.
