= Brendan O'Connell (footballer) =

English footballer

Personal information
- Full name: Brendan John O'Connell
- Date of birth: 12 November 1966 (age 59)
- Place of birth: Lambeth, England
- Height: 5 ft 10 in (1.78 m)
- Position: Midfielder

Senior career*
| Years | Team | Apps | (Gls) |
| 1985–1986 | Portsmouth | 0 | (0) |
| 1986–1988 | Exeter City | 81 | (19) |
| 1988–1990 | Burnley | 64 | (17) |
| 1990 | → Huddersfield Town (loan) | 11 | (1) |
| 1990–1996 | Barnsley | 240 | (35) |
| 1996–1997 | Charlton Athletic | 38 | (2) |
| 1997–1998 | Wigan Athletic | 17 | (5) |
| 2001–200x | Rossendale United | | |
| 2003–200x | Northwich Victoria | | |
- * Club domestic league appearances and goals

Brendan John O'Connell (born 12 November 1966) is a former professional footballer who made 451 appearances and scored 79 goals in the Football League playing as a midfielder for Portsmouth, Exeter City, Burnley, Huddersfield Town, Barnsley, Charlton Athletic and Wigan Athletic.

== Playing career ==
During his professional career, O'Connell made the majority of his appearances at Barnsley, where he played over 250 games and scored 40 goals in six seasons at the club. He won the club's Player of the Year award for the 1990–91 season.

In August 1997, O'Connell notably scored a hat-trick on his debut for Wigan Athletic in a 5–2 win against Wycombe Wanderers.

== Retirement ==
Forced to retire from playing because of a blood clot in his leg, O'Connell went on to coach Wigan Athletic's youth and reserve teams, played briefly for Rossendale United in the North West Counties League, and in 2003 became player/assistant manager of Northwich Victoria.

O'Connell later became a head soccer coach for the University of Calgary Dinos until 2023.

== Honours ==
Individual

- Barnsley Player of the Year: 1990–91
