= Gary Fleming =

Northern Irish footballer

Personal information
- Full name: James Gary Fleming
- Date of birth: 17 February 1967 (age 59)
- Place of birth: Derry, Northern Ireland
- Height: 5 ft 9 in (1.75 m)
- Position: Defender

Senior career*
| Years | Team | Apps | (Gls) |
| 1984–1989 | Nottingham Forest | 74 | (0) |
| 1989 | Manchester City | 14 | (0) |
| 1989–1990 | → Notts County (loan) | 3 | (0) |
| 1989–1996 | Barnsley | 239 | (0) |

International career
| 1986–1994 | Northern Ireland | 31 | (0) |
- * Club domestic league appearances and goals

Gary Fleming (born 17 February 1967) is a retired footballer from Derry, Northern Ireland. He played for Nottingham Forest, Manchester City and Barnsley before retiring aged 30 due to injury. Following his retirement, he became a physiotherapist for Forest and later opened his own private practice.

== Career ==
He started his career as a youth at Tristar Boys F.C. and later signed for Derry Athletic under the tutelage of coach Jim O'Hea with whom he went to Limavady United. There, he caught the eye of Nottingham Forest and in 1983 he signed a contract with them. His début was against Arsenal on 13 April 1985. He was sold to Manchester City in 1989 for a fee of £150,000, but spent only one year there before he was sold to Barnsley for £85,000.

He played 31 times for Northern Ireland between 1986 and 1994, with his last game coming against Austria. His career ended at the age of 30 due to an injury to his anterior cruciate ligament.

== Physiotherapist ==
Following his retirement, he became a physiotherapist and worked as Forest's physio for ten years until 2007. During his spell at Forest, he studied at the University of Nottingham and graduated with a BSc (Hons).

Currently, he runs his own private practice, called The Gary Fleming Practice, which opened in 2009 with centres in Nottingham and Harrogate. Fleming is one of 15 specialists in the UK to practice the Intramuscular Stimulation method.

== Honours ==
Individual

- Barnsley Player of the Year: 1992–93
