= Danny Wilson (footballer, born 1960) =

Northern Irish footballer and manager (born 1960)

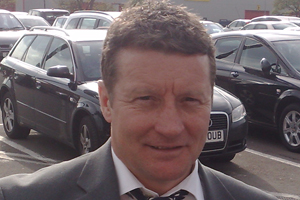
- Wilson in 2008

Personal information
- Full name: Daniel Joseph Wilson
- Date of birth: 1 January 1960 (age 66)
- Place of birth: Wigan, England
- Height: 5 ft 6 in (1.68 m)
- Position: Midfielder

Senior career*
Years	Team	Apps	(Gls)
1976–1977	Wigan Athletic	8	(1)
1977–1980	Bury	90	(9)
1980–1983	Chesterfield	100	(13)
1983	Nottingham Forest	10	(1)
1983	→ Scunthorpe United (loan)	6	(3)
1983–1987	Brighton & Hove Albion	135	(33)
1987–1990	Luton Town	110	(24)
1990–1993	Sheffield Wednesday	98	(11)
1993–1995	Barnsley	77	(2)
Total		634	(97)

International career
1987–1992	Northern Ireland	24	(1)

Managerial career
- 1994–1998: Barnsley
- 1998–2000: Sheffield Wednesday
- 2000–2004: Bristol City
- 2004–2006: Milton Keynes Dons
- 2006–2008: Hartlepool United
- 2008–2011: Swindon Town
- 2011–2013: Sheffield United
- 2013–2015: Barnsley
- 2015–2017: Chesterfield
- * Club domestic league appearances and goals

Daniel Joseph Wilson (born 1 January 1960) is a former footballer and manager. He has previously coached Sheffield Wednesday, Bristol City, Milton Keynes Dons, Hartlepool United, Swindon Town, Sheffield United, Barnsley and Chesterfield.

== Playing career ==
Born in Wigan, Lancashire, Wilson started his career with hometown club Wigan Athletic in the Northern Premier League, scoring once in eight appearances before moving to Bury in the Football League. As a player, he won the Anglo Scottish cup with Chesterfield in 1981, and went on to win the League Cup with both Luton Town in 1988 and Sheffield Wednesday in 1991. His equaliser for Luton against Arsenal with seven minutes remaining in the 1988 final is arguably the most famous match-saving goal in the club's history. He was also a runner-up in both domestic cup finals with Sheffield Wednesday in 1993. He also won 24 caps for Northern Ireland, scoring one goal.

== Managerial career ==
=== Barnsley ===
In 1993, Wilson and Viv Anderson joined Barnsley from Sheffield Wednesday on free transfers to become player-assistant manager and manager respectively. 12 months later, after a disappointing season, Wilson was appointed player-manager after Viv Anderson left to become assistant manager to Bryan Robson at Middlesbrough.

In 1994–95, Barnsley finished sixth in Division One. In an ordinary season this would have meant occupying a playoff place, but due to the Premier League reducing from 22 to 20 clubs, only two teams would be promoted (with fifth placed club occupying the final playoff place) and Barnsley missed out. The following season was a disappointment as the club finished mid-table.

In the following season, 1996–97, Wilson guided Barnsley to the Premier League as Division One runners-up. It was the first time that Barnsley had won promotion to the top division of English football. Although their stay lasted only a single season before relegation, Wilson's side reached the FA Cup quarter finals knocking out favourites Manchester United in the fifth round.

=== Sheffield Wednesday ===
In the summer of 1998, Wilson returned to his old club Sheffield Wednesday as manager and was hopeful of revitalising the club's fortunes. They had just finished 16th in the Premier League and five seasons earlier, when Wilson was still on the club's playing staff, they had reached both domestic cup finals and finished seventh in the first ever Premier League.

In 1998–99, Wilson guided Sheffield Wednesday to a respectable 12th place in the Premier League and had hopes for a top half finish the following season. But he was sacked the following March, having led the club only toward relegation. Four Sheffield based MPs including David Blunkett called for his head in January 2000 (he picked up the Premier League's Manager of the Month award in January 2000) following some poor results like losing 8–0 to Newcastle United. Bassetlaw MP Joe Ashton said after his sacking: "Danny was a lovely fellow, but he couldn't do it (manage Sheffield Wednesday).

=== Bristol City ===
In June 2000, Wilson was appointed manager of Division Two Bristol City on a four-year contract. He left the club at the end of the 2003–04 season after his contract was not renewed, having failed to achieve promotion at the club.

=== Milton Keynes Dons ===
In December 2004, Wilson took over from Stuart Murdoch as the new manager of the League One side Milton Keynes Dons. In his first season, he managed to save the club from relegation – they would have gone down had it not been for a 10-point penalty imposed on Wrexham who had gone into receivership.

Wilson was unable to save MK Dons from relegation to League Two at the end of the 2005–06 season, and he was sacked on 10 May 2006.

=== Hartlepool United ===
On 13 June 2006, Wilson was appointed manager of Hartlepool United. Wilson took over from Youth Team Coach Paul Stephenson who took temporary charge of the first team for the late stages of the 2005–06 season. Hartlepool United were relegated alongside MK Dons to League Two.

In the 2006–07 season, he brought Hartlepool to second from top of League 2 and won promotion back to League 1.

He left Hartlepool United on 15 December 2008, leaving Chris Turner in temporary charge.

=== Swindon Town ===
Appointed manager of Swindon Town on 26 December 2008, Wilson saved the team from relegation that season. Wilson brought in many new signings, including Gordon Greer, Alan O'Brien, Jonathan Douglas, David Lucas and Charlie Austin After getting Swindon into the 10 League 1 Play-off Final, the club lost 0–1 against Millwall F.C.

The following 2009–10 play-off season saw Wilson and club chairman Andrew Fitton forge many relationships with Premier League and SPL sides, most notably Liverpool, Manchester City and Celtic, who all loaned Wilson players to aid his development of the squad. Wilson released youth team goalkeeper Jamie Stephens to the Liverpool youth academy, who in turn loaned Swindon Stephen Darby, who later scored the winning penalty that put Swindon through to the 2009–10 play-off final. Simon Ferry and Paul Caddis were loaned from Celtic, both having since been signed on permanent deals from the club. Wilson loaned Manchester City striker David Ball for the 2010–11 season. On 2 March 2011, Wilson resigned his post after a poor run of form that had seen the club slip into the relegation zone.

=== Sheffield United ===
On 27 May 2011, Wilson was appointed the manager of Sheffield United. The appointment was greeted with some dissatisfaction amongst the fans, as approximately 400 gathered outside Bramall Lane to voice their anger at the appointment, particularly considering his links as a former player and manager of bitter rivals Sheffield Wednesday. Disapproving chants against his appointment could be heard throughout the announcing press conference. Wilson's subsequent statements suggested that he already felt the pressure resultant from having crossed the divide. As part of the restructure of the Blades managerial setup, captain Chris Morgan was promoted to a player-coach position. Morgan had played under Wilson during his earlier years at Barnsley. A couple of weeks later, Wilson appointed former Sheffield United player Frank Barlow as his assistant.

Wilson made a positive start at the Blades, winning his first league game in charge with a 2–0 victory over Oldham Athletic. This was then followed up by a League Cup victory over Hartlepool United and a 2–0 home victory over Brentford in Wilson's first home league game. Wilson was named League One manager of the month for December 2011 after managing the Blades to league victories over Rochdale, AFC Bournemouth, Notts County and Hartlepool United. Despite the Blades scoring 92 league goals and accumulating 90 points, they finished 3rd in Wilson's first season in charge, behind city rivals and Wilson's former team, Sheffield Wednesday. The team went on to lose on penalties in the 2011–12 League One play-off final against Huddersfield Town.

Wilson won the League One manager of the month award for October 2012 after guiding the Blades into the automatic promotion places, including a 19-game unbeaten run in all competitions. However, six months later he left Sheffield United on 10 April 2013 following a poor run of form.

=== Barnsley ===
On 17 December 2013, Wilson was announced as manager of Barnsley for the second time, fifteen years after his previous departure. He took over following the sacking of David Flitcroft with Barnsley at the foot of the Championship table.

On 12 February 2015, Wilson was sacked by Barnsley after a poor run of results.

=== Chesterfield ===
On 24 December 2015 he was named as new manager of Chesterfield, replacing Dean Saunders. His second game in charge saw an impressive 7–1 victory against Shrewsbury Town.

Wilson secured Chesterfield's League One status with a game to spare, ending the season in 18th place.

The following season started brightly under Wilson, with Chesterfield remaining unbeaten in the opening three games of the season, winning two.

Wilson was sacked as Chesterfield manager on 8 January 2017, following a 2–0 defeat at Bradford City, after a poor run of results.

== Personal life ==
Wilson lives in Chesterfield with his wife Karen, daughter Carrie and his son, Laurie, who played non-league football.

== Managerial statistics ==
Team	From	To	Record				
Team	From	To	G	W	D	L	Win %
Barnsley	2 June 1994	7 July 1998	201	74	55	72	36.82
Sheffield Wednesday	7 July 1998	21 March 2000	80	23	17	40	28.75
Bristol City	27 June 2000	5 June 2004	226	107	55	64	47.35
Milton Keynes Dons	7 December 2004 (Note: Wilson was appointed MK Dons manager on 7 December 2004, but did not take over until after that day's match, a draw with Peterborough United overseen by caretaker manager Jimmy Gilligan.)	21 June 2006	81	25	24	32	30.86
Hartlepool United	13 June 2006	15 December 2008	133	58	29	46	43.61
Swindon Town	26 December 2008 (Note: Wilson was appointed Swindon manager on 26 December 2008, but did not take charge of that day's match, a win away to Leyton Orient overseen by caretaker manager David Byrne. Wilson's first match in charge was on 28 December against Brighton & Hove Albion.)	2 March 2011	120	43	40	37	35.83
Sheffield United	27 May 2011	10 April 2013	106	55	31	20	51.89
Barnsley	17 December 2013	12 February 2015	63	19	13	31	30.16
Chesterfield	24 December 2015	8 January 2017	57	18	10	29	31.58
Total			1,067	422	274	371	39.55

== Honours ==
=== As a player ===
Chesterfield

- Anglo-Scottish Cup: 1980–81

Luton Town

- Football League Cup: 1987–88; runner-up: 1988–89
- Full Members' Cup runner-up: 1987–88

Sheffield Wednesday

- Football League Cup: 1990–91; runner-up: 1992–93
- FA Cup runner-up: 1992–93

Individual

- Barnsley Player of the Year: 1994–95

=== As a manager ===
Barnsley

- Football League First Division runner-up: 1996–97

Bristol City

- Football League Trophy: 2002–03

Hartlepool United

- Football League Two runner-up: 2006–07

Individual

- LMA Manager of the Year: 1996–97
- Premier League Manager of the Month: January 2000
- Football League Two Manager of the Month: September 2006, February 2007, March 2007
- Football League One Manager of the Month: December 2011, October 2012

== See also ==
- List of football managers with the most matches
