= Owen Archdeacon =

Scottish footballer (born 1966)

Personal information
- Full name: Owen Duncan Archdeacon
- Date of birth: 4 March 1966 (age 60)
- Place of birth: Greenock, Scotland
- Positions: Winger; midfielder

Youth career
- Gourock United

Senior career*
Years	Team	Apps	(Gls)
1982–1989	Celtic	76	(6)
1989–1996	Barnsley	233	(23)
1996–1997	Carlisle United	58	(6)
1997–1999	Greenock Morton	61	(2)
Total		428	(37)

International career
1986	Scotland U-21	1	(0)
- * Club domestic league appearances and goals

Owen Duncan Archdeacon (born 4 March 1966 in Greenock) is a Scottish former footballer. He began his senior career at Celtic before going on to play for Barnsley, Carlisle United and finally Greenock Morton. Archdeacon played on the left-wing for the majority of his career, although dropped back into a more defensive role in his later years.

== Playing career ==
Archdeacon began his career with local side Gourock United before signing for Celtic in August 1982. A left-sided player, he generally played in an attacking role wide left for Celtic. At 18 years of age, Archdeacon made his first team debut for Celtic in April 1984, coming on as a substitute and scoring in a 4–2 win over Motherwell at Celtic Park. Due to regular winger Davie Provan's illness in season 1985–1986, Archdeacon began to play regularly for the Celtic first team at that time. This run of first team action saw the young winger make 23 league appearances that season, scoring 3 goals.

Over the next three years a variety of factors dented his confidence however, and despite his undoubted skill on the ball he failed to become a first team regular at Celtic Park. He did however experience the joy of scoring against Rangers, capitalising on carelessness between Rangers full-back Jimmy Nicholl and goalkeeper Chris Woods by nipping in between them and toe-poking the ball from 15 yards into an empty net. It was Celtic's third in their 3–1 win in April 1987. Archdeacon made a handful of appearances at the start of the following season, the club's Centenary season (1987–88), and he scored direct from a free kick in a 3–2 win over Falkirk in October 1987. However, the arrival of new signings Frank McAvennie and, in particular, Joe Miller, saw Archdeacon drift out of manager Billy McNeill's plans as the season progressed.

Whilst at Celtic, Archdeacon won a Scottish Premier Division League Championship winner's medal in 1986 and made a single appearance for the Scottish under-21 team the same year against West Germany. He also made a second-half appearance as a substitute for Mark McGhee in the 2–1 defeat against Rangers in the 1986 Scottish League Cup Final.

In June 1989 Archdeacon moved to Barnsley for £80,000 he became a fixture for the Yorkshire club in the following seasons. He made 233 league appearances for the "Tykes", scoring 23 goals. Barnsley were an established side in England's second tier at that time (Division Two until 1992 when it was re-branded Division One on the formation of the FA Premier League), never quite succeeding in gaining promotion although they narrowly missed out on a play-off spot in 1990–91 on goal difference.

Archdeacon left the club in 1996 to join Carlisle United and was a regular member of the team during a season and a half there. He picked up a winner's medal in April 1997 when his side defeated Colchester 4–3 on penalties to win the Football League Trophy.

Late in 1997 former Celtic team-mate Billy Stark paid £100,000 to take him to Greenock Morton and Archdeacon played for and captained his home town side until his retirement through ankle injury in 1999.

== Retirement ==
Since retiring, Archdeacon worked for a time as a Youth Team coach with Celtic and worked with the U13's at the Academy. He has turned out for the Celtic legends team. His son Mark Archdeacon plays in the Scottish Junior Football League with Dalry Thistle after spells with Motherwell, Brechin City and Clyde.

Archdeacon's other son, Owen Jr., is a coach at Kilwinning Rangers F.C., alongside Chris Aitken and Ian Durrant.

== Honours ==
Celtic

- Scottish Premier Division: 1985–86

Carlisle United

- Football League Trophy: 1996–97

Individual

- PFA Team of the Year: 1996–97 Third Division
