= Adie Moses =

English former footballer (born 1975)

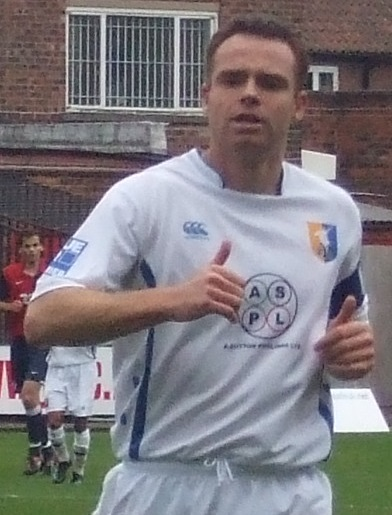
- Moses playing for Mansfield Town in 2008

Personal information
- Full name: Adrian Paul Moses
- Date of birth: 4 May 1975 (age 51)
- Place of birth: Doncaster, England
- Height: 6 ft 1 in (1.85 m)
- Position: Defender

Senior career*
Years	Team	Apps	(Gls)
1993–2001	Barnsley	151	(3)
2001–2003	Huddersfield Town	69	(1)
2003–2006	Crewe Alexandra	57	(0)
2006–2008	Lincoln City	50	(1)
2008–2009	Mansfield Town	38	(0)
2009	Gainsborough Trinity	15	(0)
Total		380	(5)

International career
	England U21	2	(0)

Managerial career
- 2008: Mansfield Town (caretaker)
- 2009: Gainsborough Trinity (caretaker)
- * Club domestic league appearances and goals

Adrian Paul "Adie" Moses (born 4 May 1975) is an English former footballer. He made over 300 appearances in the Premier League and the Football League between 1993 and 2008, he notably played for Barnsley having also featured for Huddersfield Town, Crewe Alexandra, Lincoln City, Mansfield Town and Gainsborough Trinity. He also represented England at Under-21 level.

== Career ==
Moses joined Barnsley as a junior in 1993, making over 150 appearances for the club and appearing in the Premiership. He joined Huddersfield Town for a fee in the region of £250,000 in December 2000, where he made 69 league appearances in two and a half seasons. Whilst at the club he scored twice; once against Ebbsfleet in the FA Cup and once against Notts County in the league. He left Huddersfield on a free transfer in July 2003 and joined Crewe Alexandra on a two-year contract. Injuries restricted him to 57 appearances in three seasons and he was released by Crewe at the end of the 2005–06 season. He then moved to Lincoln City and score on his debut against Notts County, but was not a regular in the first team in the 2007–08 season and was released at the end of the season. He joined Conference National club Mansfield Town in July 2008.

Moses was Captain of Mansfield Town. In December 2008, he was appointed Mansfield's caretaker manager, along with fellow player Mark Stallard, who also played for Lincoln City, after the sacking of Billy McEwan.

On 29 May 2009 Moses signed, for Gainsborough Trinity. On 27 August it was announced he would take over as caretaker manager of the club following the dismissal of manager Steve Charles, and the resignation of former caretaker managers Dave Reeves and Steve Blatherwick, until the appointment of the new manager, who was revealed as Brian Little.

== Personal life ==
On 10 November 2009, Moses retired from professional football due to ongoing injury troubles, and to concentrate on business interests away from the sport. He now works as an Associate Partner of St. James’s Place Wealth Management.

== Personal life ==
In 2008, Moses graduated from Staffordshire University with a degree in Professional Sports Writing and Broadcasting.

== Honours ==
Barnsley

- Football League First Division
  - Runner-up: 1996–97
  - Play-off finalists: 1999–2000
