= Darren Sheridan =

English footballer (born 1967)

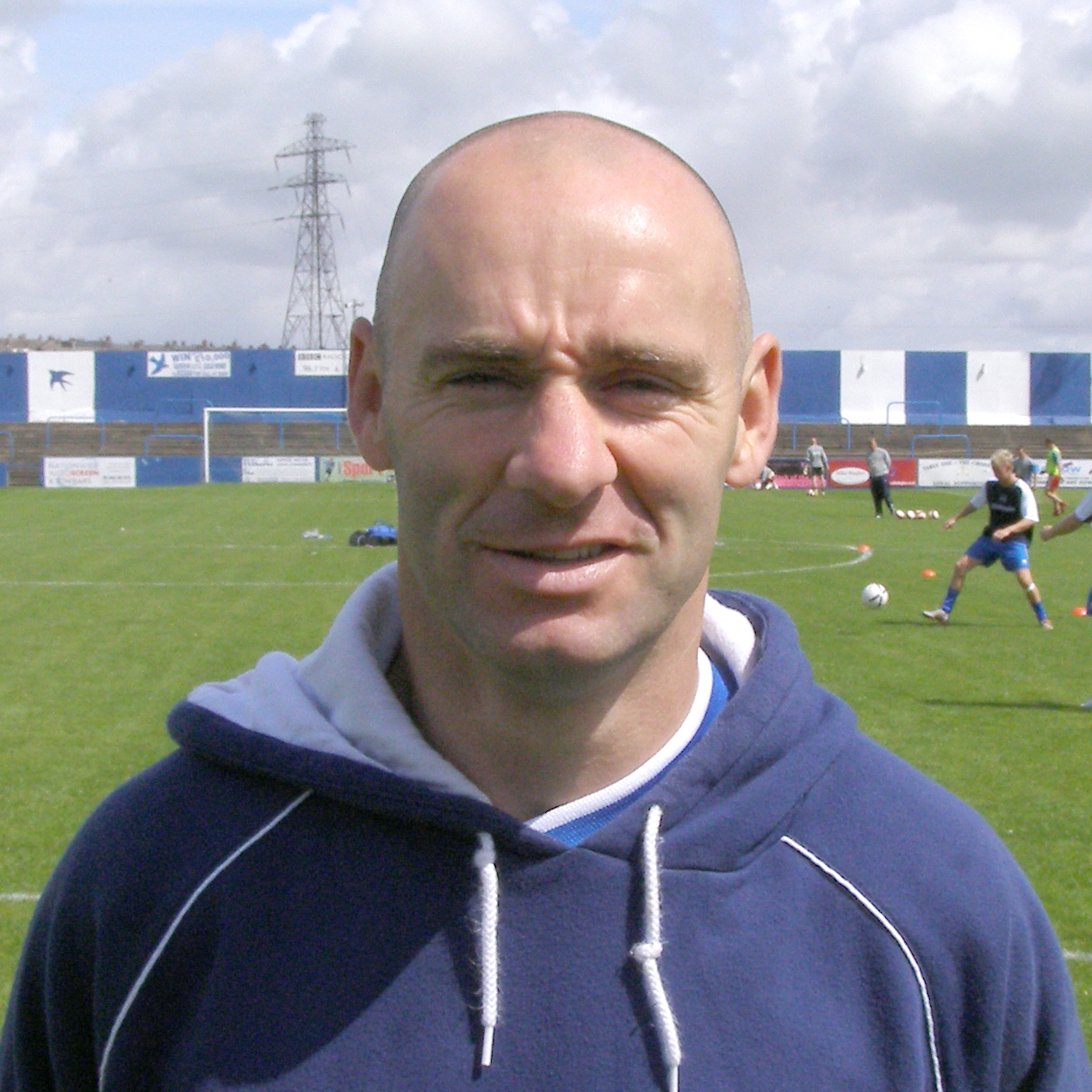
- Sheridan in 2007

Personal information
- Full name: Darren Stephen Sheridan
- Date of birth: 8 December 1967 (age 58)
- Place of birth: Stretford, England
- Height: 5 ft 6 in (1.68 m)
- Position: Midfielder

Youth career
- Leeds United

Senior career*
| Years | Team | Apps | (Gls) |
| | Mossley | 6 | |
- Curzon Ashton
| 1989-1990 | Radcliffe Borough | 13 | (0) |
| 1992–1993 | Winsford United | | |
| 1993–1999 | Barnsley | 149 | (5) |
| 1999–2001 | Wigan Athletic | 58 | (3) |
| 2001–2004 | Oldham Athletic | 72 | (3) |
| 2004–2005 | Clyde | 29 | (2) |
| 2005–2007 | St Johnstone | 42 | (0) |
| 2007–2012 | Barrow | 91 | (2) |
| 2012 | Radcliffe Borough | 7 | (0) |
| 2012 | Droylsden | 8 | |
| 2013 | Radcliffe Borough | 13 | (1) |
| Total | | 449 | (15) |

Managerial career
- 2007–2012: Barrow
- 2012–2013: Salford City
- * Club domestic league appearances and goals

Darren Stephen Sheridan (born 8 December 1967) is an English former footballer and manager. As a player, Sheridan played as a centre midfielder. He had one spell as a player-manager, with Barrow, before managing Salford City.

After a career in non-league football he moved to Barnsley, with whom he played in the Premier League in 1997–98. He then spent time with Wigan Athletic and Oldham Athletic, before moving to Scotland for three years with Clyde and St Johnstone. He moved back to England with Conference North club Barrow in January 2007, and was made co-manager with Dave Bayliss in December 2007. As joint managers, Sheridan and Bayliss achieved promotion from the Conference North via the play-offs in their first season, and the FA Trophy in 2010. Sheridan left the club for personal reasons in February 2012. After a very brief spell with Radcliffe Borough, Sheridan joined Droylsden of the Conference North.

== Career ==
Sheridan was born in Stretford, Lancashire and was an apprentice with Leeds United but was released and after that took some time out of the game. In the 1987–88 season he played for Mossley before moving to Curzon Ashton. After that he joined Radcliffe Borough then moved on to Winsford United where the club won five trophies in the 1992–93 season - the NPL Challenge Cup, NPL President's Cup, Cheshire Senior Cup, Mid-Cheshire Senior Cup and NPL Runners Up Cup. The club also finished second to Southport and their points total is a record for the most points accrued without winning the Northern Premier League title.

He signed for Barnsley in 1993 for a reported £10,000 fee and helped them win promotion to the Premier League in 1997. He played for them in their only top flight season to date (1997–98) and also helped them reach an FA Cup quarter-final that year. He featured as a substitute in Barnsley's shock FA Cup win over Manchester United in the fifth round.

In 1999, he was transferred to Wigan Athletic where he played 58 games and scored three goals, enduring two successive play-off failures in Division Two (one in the final) before linking up with his brother, John at Wigan's local rivals Oldham Athletic. He left Oldham Athletic for Clyde of Scotland in 2004.

Sheridan spent one season at Clyde, scoring twice in 29 games, before moving to St Johnstone, where he made 42 goalless appearances in 18 months, after which he moved south of the border to play non-League football for Barrow. He was hired as joint manager alongside Dave Bayliss in December 2007 following a successful run as caretaker managers, and took the team to promotion to the Conference National following a twenty-game unbeaten run. Sheridan continued to play for the club whilst managing, as Barrow managed to retain their Conference National status in the 2008/09 season. Along with Bayliss he continued the good work with the Cumbrian side in 2009–10 as Barrow yet again stayed up finishing a respectable 15th. Barrow also won the FA Trophy beating league champions Stevenage Borough 2–1 at Wembley Stadium to claim the non-league knockout competition. He continued to be a regular during the 2010–11 season, as Barrow secured their longest spell in the Conference National since its formation as the Alliance Premier League in 1979.

In the 2011–12 season Sheridan made only two league appearances as a player for Barrow, whilst the club enjoyed mid-table stability in the league. Following allegations made against Sheridan, he was suspended from Barrow on 3 February 2012. It was announced on 11 February that he had left Barrow by mutual consent, with Dave Bayliss remaining as sole manager of the club.

Immediately after leaving Barrow, Sheridan returned to Radcliffe Borough of the Northern Premier League Division One North, where he had played as a youngster. After a month, he stepped back up to the Conference North, signing with Droylsden. Sheridan played with Droylsden till the end of the 2011–12 season.

In May 2012 he was appointed as manager of Salford City, before resigning on 19 January 2013 after a review of the club's budget. Upon resigning from Salford he returned for a third spell at Radcliffe Borough where he ended his playing career.

On 26 June 2013, Sheridan was appointed chief scout at Football League Two club Plymouth Argyle He left his position at Plymouth on 15 June 2015 due to a backroom staff restructuring.

== Personal life ==
He is the younger brother of former Sheffield Wednesday star, John Sheridan. He is also the uncle of midfielder Sam Sheridan.

== Honours ==
=== As a player ===
Barnsley

- Football League First Division runner-up: 1996–97

=== As manager ===
Barrow

- Conference North play-offs: 2007–08
- FA Trophy: 2009–10
