= Neil Redfearn =

English association football player

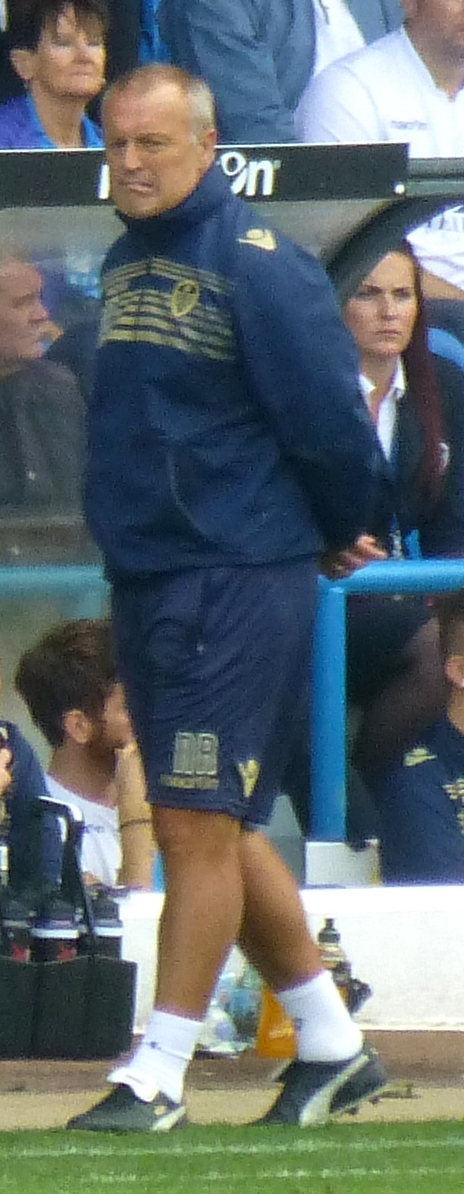
- Redfearn managing Leeds United in 2014

Personal information
- Full name: Neil David Redfearn
- Date of birth: 20 June 1965 (age 61)
- Place of birth: Dewsbury, England
- Height: 5 ft 9 in (1.75 m)
- Position: Midfielder

Youth career
- –1982: Nottingham Forest

Senior career*
Years	Team	Apps	(Gls)
1982–1984	Bolton Wanderers	35	(1)
1984–1986	Lincoln City	100	(13)
1986–1987	Doncaster Rovers	46	(14)
1987–1988	Crystal Palace	57	(10)
1988–1989	Watford	24	(3)
1989–1991	Oldham Athletic	62	(16)
1991–1998	Barnsley	292	(72)
1998–1999	Charlton Athletic	30	(3)
1999–2000	Bradford City	17	(1)
2000–2001	Wigan Athletic	22	(7)
2001–2002	Halifax Town	42	(6)
2002–2004	Boston United	54	(12)
2004	Rochdale	9	(0)
2004–2006	Scarborough	61	(18)
2006–2007	Bradford Park Avenue		
2007	Stocksbridge Park Steels		
2007	Frickley Athletic		
2007–2008	Bridlington Town		
2008	Emley		
2008	Salford City		
Total		851	(176)

Managerial career
- 2001: Halifax Town (caretaker)
- 2002: Halifax Town (caretaker)
- 2005–2006: Scarborough
- 2007: Northwich Victoria
- 2008: York City (caretaker)
- 2012: Leeds United (caretaker)
- 2013: Leeds United (caretaker)
- 2014: Leeds United (caretaker)
- 2014–2015: Leeds United
- 2015–2016: Rotherham United
- 2017–2018: Doncaster Rovers Belles
- 2018: Liverpool Women
- 2020–2022: Sheffield United Women
- 2025: Farsley Celtic
- * Club domestic league appearances and goals

Neil David Redfearn (born 20 June 1965) is an English football coach and former player who was most recently the manager of Farsley Celtic.

Redfearn, a midfielder, played 790 matches in the Football League, the sixth highest total of all time, and more than a thousand first-team matches overall in a career that has spanned 25 years. He has had spells as caretaker manager of Halifax Town and York City and as manager of Scarborough, Northwich Victoria and Leeds United.

== Playing career ==
Born in Dewsbury, West Riding of Yorkshire, Redfearn began his career at Bolton Wanderers on 23 June 1982, having previously been on the books of Nottingham Forest's youth team. He later made his name as goalscoring midfielder at lower-division sides Lincoln City and Doncaster Rovers. In May 1985, 56 spectators were killed in a stadium fire while he was playing for Lincoln against Bradford City. In 1987, he was signed by Crystal Palace for £100,000, and he later played for Watford, before moving again in 1989 to Oldham Athletic.

Redfearn's last season with Oldham constituted a career highlight as he was an ever-present in the team that won the Second Division title and returned the Latics to the top-flight of English football after a gap of 68 years. Redfearn converted the injury time penalty kick in the final game of the season against Sheffield Wednesday that completed a 3–2 victory (after Oldham had trailed 2–0), and snatched the championship from West Ham United, who had prematurely been handed the trophy some 15 minutes earlier. Despite his contribution to Oldham's promotion, he became surplus to requirements with the re-signing of former club captain Mike Milligan from Everton in the off-season and Redfearn was transferred without playing for Oldham in the top flight.

In September 1991, Redfearn joined Barnsley, and it was at this club he arguably spent his prime years. In his seven seasons at Oakwell, he rarely missed a single game, and was named club captain and penalty taker. In the 1996–97 season, Redfearn scored 17 goals as Barnsley won promotion to the FA Premier League for the first time in the club's history. Redfearn missed only one game, and was Barnsley's top scorer with ten league goals in the 1997–98 season. These included Barnsley's first ever top division goal on the opening day of the season, when he put them ahead in the ninth minute at home to West Ham United, although they ended up losing the game 2–1.

It was not enough to save them though, as Barnsley were relegated that season. However, despite being in his thirties, Redfearn's performances had made him a wanted man in the Premier League, and he was signed by Charlton Athletic for £1 million in the summer of 1998. He left Barnsley having played 338 first team games, scoring 83 goals.

In the 1998–99 season, his family did not settle in London, and at the end of the season, Redfearn jumped at the chance of returning to his native Yorkshire, when Bradford City paid £250,000 for his services. Redfearn did not make much impact at Bradford, scoring just once against Leicester City, and joined his 10th team, Wigan Athletic after just nine months in Bradford. Despite a very good goalscoring record, Redfearn never became first-choice at Wigan either, and he dropped down two divisions to join Halifax Town in 2001.

== Late playing career and early managerial career ==
At Halifax, he also got his first taste of management, being appointed caretaker manager alongside Tony Parks following the resignation of Paul Bracewell on 30 August 2001. His spell as caretaker manager came to an end on 12 October following the appointment of Alan Little. Redfearn started a second spell in caretaker charge on 4 March 2002 due to the enforced absence of Little. However, his contract with the club was terminated on 25 April and having been snubbed for the permanent manager's job he joined Boston United as player-coach.

Redfearn spent the better part of two years at Boston, before finishing his Football League career at Rochdale in the spring of 2004. Rochdale did not offer him a new contract at the end of the season, meaning he finished his Football League career with 790 appearances and so being fifth in the all-time list of most Football League appearances. His last league appearance for Rochdale took his total to . after which Redfearn dropped down to the Conference, where he became player-coach at Scarborough, managed at the time by his former Oldham teammate Nick Henry. He signed a new contract with Scarborough in April 2005. When Henry was dismissed on 24 October 2005 Redfearn was named caretaker manager, before being appointed permanently on 1 November while remaining registered as a player. Redfearn resigned on 6 July 2006 after Mark Patterson was brought in as assistant manager. He subsequently signed with Northern Premier League First Division side Bradford Park Avenue later that month. He made his 1,000th competitive appearance on 4 November 2006, when Bradford Park Avenue faced Solihull Borough in the second qualifying round of the FA Trophy.

Redfearn quit Bradford Park Avenue in March 2007, joining Northern Premier League First Division rivals Stocksbridge Park Steels, but left on 19 June to become manager of Conference Premier side Northwich Victoria. He resigned on 17 September 2007, after the club only managed one point from their first nine games, leaving them bottom of the Conference Premier.

He joined Northern Premier League Premier Division club Frickley Athletic as a player in September 2007. He left the club over a month later to join Bridlington Town on 5 November. He left them in January 2008 after the departure of manager Ash Berry. He was appointed as York City's youth team coach in February. He joined Emley in July, where he would play when his commitments with York's youth team allowed. Redfearn moved onto Salford City of the Northern Premier League Division One North in October 2008. He took over as caretaker manager at York on 21 November 2008, following Colin Walker's dismissal, and was in charge for the team's 2–2 draw against Crawley Town. Following Martin Foyle's appointment as manager on 24 November, Redfearn took up the position of assistant manager at the club.

== Coaching and managerial career ==
=== Leeds United ===
Redfearn left York over a month later after being appointed coach of the under-18 academy team at Leeds United on 30 December 2008 and he assumed this role on 1 January 2009. He took over as manager of the Leeds reserve team in December 2010 following the dismissal of Neil Thompson. He was appointed caretaker manager at Leeds following the dismissal of manager Simon Grayson on 1 February 2012. Three days later he won his first match in charge by beating Bristol City 3–0. It was later confirmed by club chairman Ken Bates that Redfearn would retain the managerial post for the following three games. After two wins and two defeats in his four-game spell as manager, Redfearn was replaced as manager by Neil Warnock as permanent manager on 18 February 2012. In April 2012, Redfearn guided Leeds' Under 18's side to a second-place finish in the Under-18s League, narrowly missing out on top spot to Newcastle's Under-18s team.

Following the departure of Neil Warnock on 1 April 2013, Redfearn again took charge of the first team for the game at for the 2–1 away defeat against Charlton Athletic on 6 April.

Redfearn's spell as the Head of academy was praised due to the influx of Leeds academy players breaking through into the first team such as Dominic Poleon, Chris Dawson, Sam Byram, Alex Mowatt, Lewis Cook and Kalvin Phillips.

On 28 August 2014, Redfearn was appointed caretaker head coach after head coach Dave Hockaday and his assistant Junior Lewis were dismissed by owner Massimo Cellino, having been in the job for only 70 days. This was the third time Redfearn had been appointed as a caretaker manager/head coach of Leeds. Redfearn picked up a victory in his first game back in charge with a 1–0 win on 30 August against Bolton Wanderers. On 20 September, Redfearn's Leeds picked up a 3–0 win over local rivals Huddersfield Town. After recording a record of three wins and one draw in his latest stint as caretaker, Leeds announced that Redfearn would be stepping back down into a role described as "Academy manager and head of coaching." with Darko Milanič appointed the new head coach of Leeds on a two-year deal replacing previous head coach Dave Hockaday, he was joined at Leeds by his SK Sturm Graz Assistant Novica Nikčević.

On 25 October 2014, Milanič was dismissed by the club after only 32 days in charge. Cellino confirmed that Redfearn would be appointed as Leeds' new head coach. On 27 October 2014 Redfearn confirmed that he verbally agreed to become head coach of Leeds after receiving reassurances that if it does not work out, he will revert to his previous job back in the academy. On 1 November 2014, Redfearn was confirmed as the club's new head coach, on an initial 12-month contract with the option of a further 12 months, the contract also had a clause that would see Redfearn return to the academy if he was to leave his role as head coach. On 18 December 2014, Steve Thompson was hired as Redfearn's new assistant manager.

On 2 April 2015, Redfearn's assistant Steve Thompson was suspended by Leeds for an 'internal matter' by Leeds Sporting Director Nicola Salerno, with Redfearn saying that he was kept in the dark about the cause.

Also on 2 April 2015, a story emerged that Redfearn had been put under pressure to 'not select' top scorer Mirco Antenucci, because Antenucci's contract featured a clause of an extra year on his contract, should he score 12 goals in his first season. Antenucci's agent Silvio Pagliari confirmed the clause was correct. Despite this, Redfearn started Antenucci, with Antenucci making a relatively rare start against Wolverhampton Wanderers on 6 April in a 4–3 defeat. On 24 June 2015, former Sporting Director Nicola Salerno proclaimed the decision to not play Antenucci prior was Redfearn's decision.

On 9 April, after rumoured Premier League interest in Alex Mowatt and teammates Lewis Cook, Charlie Taylor and Sam Byram, Redfearn challenged Leeds United's owners to keep a hold of their home grown talents.

On 18 April 2015, six of owner Massimo Cellino's signings (Mirco Antenucci, Giuseppe Bellusci, Souleymane Doukara, Dario Del Fabro, Marco Silvestri and Edgar Cani) controversially pulled out of the squad with an 'injury' the day before a 2–1 loss against Charlton Athletic.

On 14 May 2015, Cellino gave a press conference announcing Adam Pearson as the club's executive director to work directly alongside Cellino. The press conference included Cellino leaving halfway through for a cigarette break only to return, and for the press conference to run for over an hour, with Cellino refusing to reveal the future of Redfearn.

On 16 May, with speculation increasing about his future as Leeds United Head Coach, Cellino in an interview with the Sunday Mirror said that Redfearn was "weak" and "a baby".

On 20 May 2015, Leeds announced Uwe Rösler as the new head coach, ending Redfearn's leadership at the club, with no announcement made of Redfearn's departure as head coach. Leeds executive director Adam Pearson said in the Rosler press conference that Redfearn had been offered back his previous role as Academy Director.

=== Rotherham United ===
On 9 October 2015, Redfearn was appointed manager of Championship club Rotherham United on a two-and-a-half-year deal. He was dismissed as manager on 8 February 2016, with Rotherham 22nd in the table.

=== Doncaster Rovers Belles ===
On 29 December 2017, Doncaster Rovers Belles announced the appointment of Redfearn as their new manager. On 13 May 2018, the Belles won the FA WSL 2 title, their first trophy since 1994.

=== Liverpool Women ===
On 12 June 2018, he was appointed as the new manager of Liverpool Women (then Liverpool Ladies). His first and ultimately only match in charge ended in a sobering 5–0 loss to Arsenal Women. He resigned on 14 September 2018 after just one game in charge.

=== Newcastle United U23 ===
On 2 October 2018, Redfearn was appointed as the new assistant coach of Ben Dawson at Newcastle United U23.

On 21 June 2019, Redfearn was promoted to the role of Newcastle United U23 head coach.

On 4 July 2019, Redfearn was announced as the caretaker head coach, assisted by Ben Dawson after the departure of manager Rafael Benítez on 30 June. He took charge of first team training for the 2019/20 pre-season. On 5 November 2019, Redfearn stepped down from this position.

=== Sheffield United Women ===
On 28 August 2020, Redfearn was announced as the new head coach of Sheffield United Women.

In November 2022, he announced his immediate resignation from the Blades.

=== Oldham Athletic ===
On 22 September 2023, Redfearn returned to former club Oldham Athletic in the role of caretaker assistant manager, assisting Steve Thompson. With the appointment of a permanent manager imminent, both Redfearn and Thompson departed the club on 12 October.

In November 2023 he became the lead professional development phase coach of Bradford City.

=== Farsley Celtic ===
On 17 January 2025, Redfearn was appointed manager of National League North side Farsley Celtic. However after less than 3 weeks in the post, Redfearn resigned after 4 matches in charge.

== Personal life ==
Redfearn's father, Brian, is a former professional footballer. He is a lifelong Leeds fan. Redfearn married Susan Roberts in 1985. He is currently in a relationship with Lucy Ward, a former footballer and current football broadcaster and pundit.

== Managerial statistics ==
As of 14 September 2018

Managerial record by team and tenure
Team	From	To	Record					Ref
Team	From	To	P	W	D	L	Win %	Ref
Halifax Town (caretaker)	30 August 2001	12 October 2001	8	2	3	3	25.0	
Halifax Town (caretaker)	4 March 2002	25 April 2002	10	3	1	6	30.0	
Scarborough	24 October 2005	6 July 2006	29	6	7	16	20.7	
Northwich Victoria	19 June 2007	17 September 2007	9	0	1	8	0.0	
York City (caretaker)	21 November 2008	24 November 2008	1	0	1	0	0.0	
Leeds United (caretaker)	1 February 2012	20 February 2012	4	2	0	2	50.0	
Leeds United (caretaker)	1 April 2013	12 April 2013	1	0	0	1	0.0	
Leeds United (caretaker)	28 August 2014	23 September 2014	4	3	1	0	75.0	
Leeds United	1 November 2014	20 May 2015	33	11	7	15	33.3	
Rotherham United	9 October 2015	8 February 2016	21	5	2	14	23.8	
Doncaster Rovers Belles	29 December 2017	12 June 2018	14	12	0	2	85.7	
Liverpool Women	12 June 2018	14 September 2018	2	0	0	2	0.0	
Sheffield United Women	1 August 2020	2022	59	26	16	17	44.1	
Total			195	70	39	86	35.9	

== Honours ==
=== Player ===
Oldham Athletic

- Football League Second Division: 1990–91

Individual

- Barnsley Player of the Year: 1993–94
- Barnsley Hall of Fame inductee

=== Manager ===
Doncaster Rovers Belles

- FA WSL 2: 2017–18

== See also ==
- List of men's footballers with 1,000 or more official appearances
- List of footballers in England by number of league appearances
