= Andy Liddell =

Footballer (born 1973)

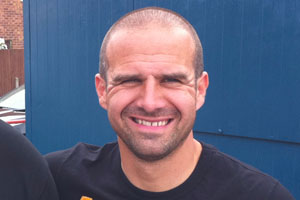

Personal information
- Full name: Andrew Mark Liddell
- Date of birth: 28 June 1973 (age 53)
- Place of birth: Leeds, England
- Height: 5 ft 7 in (1.70 m)
- Position: Right winger

Youth career
- –1991: Barnsley

Senior career*
Years	Team	Apps	(Gls)
1991–1998	Barnsley	198	(34)
1998–2004	Wigan Athletic	217	(70)
2004–2005	Sheffield United	33	(3)
2005–2009	Oldham Athletic	125	(29)
2009	Bradford Park Avenue	0	(0)
2009–2010	Rotherham United	2	(0)
Total		583	(137)

International career
1993–1996	Scotland U21	12	(2)

Managerial career
- 2011: Rotherham United (caretaker)
- 2011–2018: Ipswich Town (fitness coach)
- 2023: Maccabi Tel Aviv (fitness coach)
- 2024: Rapid București (fitness coach)
- 2025-: Preston North End (fitness coach)
- * Club domestic league appearances and goals

Andrew "Andy" Mark Liddell (born 28 June 1973) is a former professional footballer who played as a right winger. Born in England, he played for the Scotland U21 national team.

== Career ==
=== Early career ===
Born in Leeds, West Riding of Yorkshire, Liddell started his league career at Barnsley, making his début as a substitute against Portsmouth in 1992. He helped his team achieve promotion to the Premiership in 1997.

Liddell played a part in a significant moment during Barnsley's Premier League season. On the Reds' visit to Anfield to play Liverpool, Liddell created Barnsley's match-winning goal. After being brought down by David James in the penalty area, Liddell could have won a penalty kick but persisted and set up Ashley Ward, who scored via a deflection off Patrick Berger.

He fell out of favour in subsequent years, making most of his appearances from the substitute's bench.

=== Wigan Athletic ===
In October 1998, Liddell moved to Wigan Athletic for £350,000, netting ten league goals in his first season at the club. After helping his team to Associate Members Cup success in 1999, he went on to become Wigan Athletic's Player of the Year for the 1999–2000 season.

In the 2001–2002 campaign, Liddell finished as the club's leading scorer, an instrumental part of the team that would reach the play-offs for the second time in succession. During the course of the season, he scored the club's 1,500th league goal and his first career hat-trick against Brighton, following this up with another in a 4–1 defeat of Cambridge United. He received a call-up from Scotland coach Berti Vogts and attended an end-of-season training camp.

Liddell was Wigan Athletic's longest-serving player when he left to join Sheffield United in 2004. He played just under 250 games for Wigan, finishing as the club's leading scorer with a tally of 70 goals, four more than that of David Lowe, the club's previous all-time leading goal-getter.

In his final season for Wigan Athletic he played 38 games and scored 9 goals. When informed his place in the first team for the following season was uncertain, he transferred to Sheffield United.

=== Sheffield United ===
Liddell made his debut against Burnley on 7 August 2004, and his first goal followed against Nottingham Forest. Some of Liddell's most memorable appearances for United came in the FA Cup; in the third round they played Premier League side Aston Villa and beat them 3–1, with Liddell scoring twice. In the following round United faced fellow Championship club West Ham United. The tie went to a replay, in which Liddell scored as the game finished 1-1. In the subsequent penalty shootout he scored the winning penalty to send United through to the fifth round where they faced Arsenal.

=== Oldham Athletic ===
Liddell made his 100th league appearance for Oldham on 20 September 2008 in a 3–3 draw with Hartlepool United. Oldham terminated his contract on 7 April 2009, effectively ending his career with the club after a four-year stint in which he made 144 appearances.

=== Rotherham United ===
Liddell dropped into Non-League football at the age of 36 when he signed for Northern Premier League club Bradford Park Avenue in July 2009. Chief executive Bob Blackburn described it as a "huge signing" for Avenue. On 30 July, however, Liddell signed a one-month contract with Rotherham United after impressing whilst on trial. This was later extended to a year but, after only two appearances. because of injury he called time on his playing career. On 22 March 2011, Liddell became Rotherham's caretaker manager for the remainder of the 2010–11 season, after manager Ronnie Moore left the club, to be assisted by Paul Warne and Andy Dibble. He immediately took on Nicky Eaden as a new coach for the club.

=== International ===
Liddell appeared 12 times for the Scotland under-21 team in the mid-1990s. In 2002, he played with the senior Scotland squad in a 'behind closed doors' warm-up match against Dundee United, but was never selected for a full international.

== Personal life ==
He is the son of the late Gary Liddell, a former Leeds United and Grimsby Town striker.

== Honours ==
=== Player ===
Wigan Athletic

- Football League Second Division: 2002–03
- Football League Trophy: 1998–99
