= Steve Davis (footballer, born 1965) =

English footballer and manager

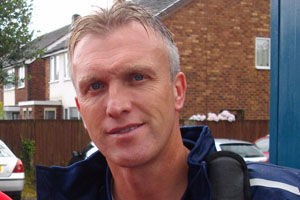
- Davis in 2012

Personal information
- Full name: Steven Peter Davis
- Date of birth: 26 July 1965 (age 61)
- Place of birth: Birmingham, England
- Height: 6 ft 0 in (1.83 m)
- Position: Defender

Senior career*
Years	Team	Apps	(Gls)
1982–1983	Stoke City	0	(0)
1983–1987	Crewe Alexandra	145	(1)
1987–1991	Burnley	147	(11)
1991–1998	Barnsley	107	(10)
1997	→ York City (loan)	2	(1)
1998	→ Oxford United (loan)	7	(1)
1998–2000	Oxford United	35	(2)
2000	Macclesfield Town	0	(0)
2000–2002	Northwich Victoria	21	(0)
2004–2009	Nantwich Town	68	(2)
Total		464	(26)

International career
1982	England youth	1	(0)

Managerial career
- 2003: Northwich Victoria
- 2004–2009: Nantwich Town
- 2011–2017: Crewe Alexandra
- 2017: Leyton Orient
- 2022: Wolverhampton Wanderers (caretaker)
- * Club domestic league appearances and goals

Steven Peter Davis (born 26 July 1965) is an English football manager and former professional footballer who is currently Player Pathway & Loans Manager for Wolverhampton Wanderers.

As a defender, he played over 100 league games at each of three clubs: Crewe Alexandra, Burnley and Barnsley. After managing Cheshire-based non-league teams Northwich Victoria and Nantwich Town, he was appointed assistant manager at Crewe Alexandra in 2009. Two years later, in November 2011, he was appointed Crewe manager, winning a Wembley play-off final in 2012 and the EFL Trophy in 2013. He left Crewe in January 2017 (at which date he was the fourth longest serving manager in the top four divisions of English football) and then head coach at National League club Leyton Orient for just over four months to November 2017. He later joined Wolves as under-18s coach. In October 2022 he became interim manager of Wolves' first team ahead of Julen Lopetegui taking charge from 14 November 2022.

== Club career ==
Born in Birmingham, Davis started his career with Stoke City as an apprentice in 1982 but never made a senior appearance. However, he played more than 140 matches for both Crewe Alexandra and Burnley, making his Crewe debut at the age of 18, and captaining the team aged 19. He was also a key figure in the time he was at Burnley. He then played over 100 matches for Barnsley in Division 1, including 24 appearances in the season in which they were promoted to the Premier League. He had loan spells at York City and Oxford United, eventually being signed by Division 1 outfit, Oxford United in 1998.

The final years of his playing career saw him in Cheshire with Macclesfield Town, and with Northwich Victoria and Nantwich Town – where he was player-manager of both clubs.

== International career ==
Davis was capped by the England national youth team.

== Management career ==
=== Northwich Victoria ===
He was appointed as player-manager of Northwich Victoria in June 2003. He resigned in September 2003, after the team were second bottom of the Conference National in the 2003–04 season.

=== Nantwich Town ===
However, his managerial career at Nantwich Town was the most successful time in the club's long history, converting a club that had never achieved anything above the North West Counties League to one that was challenging for a Conference spot. He led Nantwich to two promotions in successive seasons and a FA Vase victory, just missing out on promotion to the Conference North at the end of the 2008–09 season. His abilities attracted the attention of Crewe Alexandra, where he had spent four seasons as a player. On 17 May 2009, it was announced that he would become assistant manager to Gudjon Thordarson at Crewe.

=== Crewe Alexandra ===
Davis remained as Thordarson's assistant through the Icelandic's short lived tenure at Gresty Road before the former Stoke City manager was relieved of his role in October 2009. Taking up the vacant manager's role was Dario Gradi, now in his third stint as Crewe manager kept Davis as his assistant manager. Gradi remained in the managerial position at the club until the autumn of 2011 his position was starting to become questioned by the Crewe fans, this was only galvanised further by a 3–0 home defeat to Torquay United which left the club near the relegation zone. Although Gradi was still manager of the club, Davis took charge of the next match against Oldham Athletic in the Football League Trophy after the Crewe manager could not attend after feeling unwell. Although Crewe lost the match 3–1, Davis was appointed the new Crewe manager a couple of days later with Gradi moving to his former role as Technical Director – a role he took following the appointment of Steve Holland as first team coach back in the summer of 2007.

Promoting coach Neil Baker as his assistant manager, Davis' first match, officially, as Crewe manager was a home FA Cup tie to Colchester United. Although the railwaymen lost the tie 4–1, Davis' brief for the remainder season was specific: keep Crewe in the football league. Davis was successful in his target keeping Crewe in the football league and, in a run that saw the club go 16 matches unbeaten, the English manager helped Crewe qualify for the League Two play-offs. Following a 3–2 win over two legs with Southend United and a 2–0 win over Cheltenham Town at Wembley, Davis' team were promoted to League One.

Davis had lost two key figures in that season's promotion campaign in the summer with Nick Powell completing a three million pound transfer to Manchester United and captain Ashley Westwood for an undisclosed fee to Aston Villa but they were replaced by a number of summer signings such as forward Mathias Pogba, defender Mark Ellis and midfielder Abdul Osman. Davis successfully secured safety in League One in his first season and also guided his team to a second Wembley appearance this time in the final of the Football League Trophy against Southend. The Railwaymen won the tie 2–0 with goals from Luke Murphy and Max Clayton.

As with the previous summer, Davis lost a key member of his midfield this time in the form of Luke Murphy who left the club for Championship club Leeds United in 2013 for a million pounds. Despite a brief period linking him with the vacant Wolves managerial position, Davis remained at the Alex. The 2013–14 season was less successful than Davis' previous seasons, compacted even more after seven first team players were held by Devon and Cornwall Police for an alleged sexual assault during the team's pre-season training in Redruth. The players were cleared of all charges in November, a few months into the new campaign. Davis described the decision as a "noose being removed from our necks" citing the case as one of the reasons for the team's poor start to the campaign. Further to the sex assault allegations, Davis was also having attitude issues with summer signing Anthony Grant and former Newcastle youngster Brad Inman – listing the pair on loan and isolating them from the rest of the squad in training labelling the pair as a "disruption." The pair were later reinstated to the squad and first team duties following an improvement in their attitudes and helped Crewe avoid relegation on the last day of the season with a 2–1 victory over local rivals Preston North End.

The 2014–15 season was no better in terms of Crewe's performance. The team lost 10 of their first 12 matches, and eventually finished in 20th position – remaining in League One despite losing the final match of the season, against Bradford City, because of results in fixtures elsewhere.

The following season started in a similar pattern, with the team winning just two of their first 15 league matches, and crashing out of the FA Cup in the first round, defeated at Gresty Road by non-league Eastleigh, forcing Davis to defend his position as the 'right man' for the job. Crewe's relegation to League Two was confirmed following a 3–0 defeat at Port Vale on 9 April 2016, with five matches remaining.

Davis was sacked as Crewe Alexandra manager on 8 January 2017, at which date he was the fourth longest serving manager in the top four divisions of English football.

=== Leyton Orient ===
On 10 July 2017, Davis was appointed as head coach of newly relegated National League club Leyton Orient on a two-year contract. After the club won just five of their 19 league matches, he was sacked on 14 November 2017.

In September 2018, Davis was reported to be in the running to be appointed manager of Cheltenham Town.

=== Wolverhampton Wanderers ===
He subsequently joined Wolverhampton Wanderers as under-18s head coach. In October 2022, following the sacking of Bruno Lage, Davis was appointed interim manager of his boyhood club, with under-23s coach James Collins, also formerly at Crewe, as his assistant. His first game in charge was a 3–0 defeat at Chelsea. His first win was a 1–0 victory at Molineux against Nottingham Forest. After multiple failed attempts by the club to sign a permanent manager, it was initially announced Davis would remain in charge for the rest of 2022. However, Wolves re-approached Julen Lopetegui and, on 5 November 2022, announced he would become their new head coach, taking charge from 14 November 2022.

After the success for the under-18s squad, and brief caretaker stint for Wolves' first team, the club appointed Davis as Player Pathways Manager to help link the academy players with the first team players. This had proven successful during his time as caretaker manager, with Joe Hodge, Hugo Bueno and Dexter Lembikisa given more first team experience and regular game time. Davis's former assistant manager at under-18s level, James McPike took over as caretaker manager, until a permanent replacement was found.

== Personal life ==
Davis's son Harry was at Crewe Alexandra but now plays for AFC Fylde, and is also a centre-back. He made his professional debut at the end of the 2009–10 season, playing for Crewe against Bradford City.

Another son, Joe, is a former defender, having made his professional debut at Port Vale during his first spell in April 2011. During Steve Davis's time as Crewe manager, for 33 minutes of a match at Port Vale on 22 February 2014, his sons played on opposite teams against each other. Joe later played at Nantwich Town before retiring.

== Career statistics ==
Club	Season	League			FA Cup		League Cup		Other		Total	
Club	Season	Division	Apps	Goals	Apps	Goals	Apps	Goals	Apps	Goals	Apps	Goals
Stoke City	1982–83	First Division	0	0	0	0	0	0	0	0	0	0
Crewe Alexandra	1983–84	Fourth Division	24	0	0	0	3	0	2	0	29	0
Crewe Alexandra	1984–85	Fourth Division	40	0	1	0	2	0	2	0	45	0
Crewe Alexandra	1985–86	Fourth Division	45	1	1	0	3	0	2	0	51	1
Crewe Alexandra	1986–87	Fourth Division	33	0	1	0	2	0	2	0	38	0
Crewe Alexandra	1987–88	Fourth Division	3	0	0	0	0	0	0	0	3	0
Crewe Alexandra	Total		145	1	3	0	10	0	8	0	166	1
Burnley	1987–88	Fourth Division	33	5	0	0	1	0	7	0	41	5
Burnley	1988–89	Fourth Division	37	0	1	0	3	0	3	1	44	1
Burnley	1989–90	Fourth Division	31	1	5	0	0	0	2	0	38	1
Burnley	1990–91	Fourth Division	46	5	3	0	3	0	7	0	59	5
Burnley	Total		147	11	9	0	7	0	19	1	182	12
Barnsley	1991–92	Second Division	9	0	0	0	0	0	0	0	9	0
Barnsley	1992–93	First Division	11	0	0	0	0	0	0	0	11	0
Barnsley	1993–94	First Division	0	0	0	0	0	0	0	0	0	0
Barnsley	1994–95	First Division	36	2	1	0	2	0	0	0	39	2
Barnsley	1995–96	First Division	27	5	2	0	3	0	0	0	32	5
Barnsley	1996–97	First Division	24	3	0	0	4	0	0	0	28	3
Barnsley	Total		107	10	3	0	9	0	0	0	119	10
York City (loan)	1997–98	Second Division	2	1	0	0	0	0	0	0	2	1
Oxford United	1997–98	First Division	15	2	0	0	0	0	0	0	15	2
Oxford United	1998–99	First Division	3	0	0	0	0	0	0	0	3	0
Oxford United	1999–2000	Second Division	24	1	1	0	4	0	1	0	30	1
Oxford United	Total		42	3	1	0	4	0	1	0	48	3
Career total			443	26	16	0	30	0	28	1	517	27

== Managerial statistics ==
As of match played 12 November 2022

Managerial record by team and tenure
Team	From	To	Record					Ref
Team	From	To	P	W	D	L	Win %	Ref
Northwich Victoria	4 June 2003	29 September 2003	11	1	3	7	9.1	
Crewe Alexandra	10 November 2011	8 January 2017	272	84	71	117	30.9	
Leyton Orient	10 July 2017	14 November 2017	22	6	5	11	27.3	
Wolverhampton Wanderers	2 October 2022	14 November 2022	8	2	1	5	25.0	
Total			313	93	80	140	29.7	—

== Honours ==
=== Player ===
Burnley

- Associate Members' Cup runner-up: 1987–88

Barnsley

- Football League First Division second-place promotion: 1996–97

Individual

- PFA Team of the Year: 1990–91 Fourth Division

=== Manager ===
Nantwich Town

- FA Vase: 2005–06

Crewe Alexandra

- Football League Two play-offs: 2012
- Football League Trophy: 2012–13
