= History of Barnsley F.C. =

History of an English football club

Barnsley Football Club is a professional football club based in Barnsley, South Yorkshire, England.

== The early years and FA Cup glory (1887–1912) ==
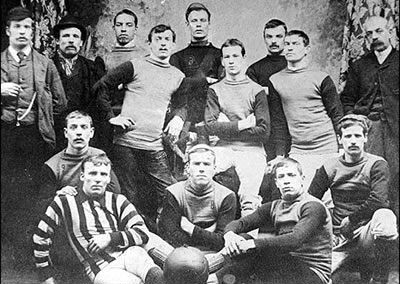
A Barnsley team in 1897, when the club was called Barnsley St. Peter's

The football club 'Barnsley St. Peters' were formed in 1887, named after the church of the Reverend Tiverton Preedy, who founded the club in what had previously been a rugby-focused area. They began playing at their home Oakwell within a year, competing in the Sheffield and District League from 1890 and then in the Midland League from 1895. In 1897 the club was renamed Barnsley Football Club as the Reverend Preedy had since departed and the fanbase now encompassed a much wider area than the local parish. In the next season they were runners-up in the Midlands League and had also played in the Yorkshire League. Following this success, in 1898 they applied to join the Football League and were eventually voted into the third and final available spot.

- 1912 FA Cup winning squad

Their first game in the Football League was a 1–0 defeat away at Lincoln City on 1 September 1898. Their first league win was a 2–0 victory at home against Luton Town, with John McArtney scoring the first ever league goal for the Tykes from the penalty spot. The team struggled in Division Two for the first ten years, due in part to ongoing financial difficulties. But then came the 1909–10 season, which saw the team on better form than they had ever been. They had a spectacular FA Cup run, beating out Blackpool, Bristol Rovers, West Bromwich Albion and Everton to reach the final. Here they played Newcastle United and were leading 1–0 until the final minute when Newcastle controversially equalised, causing a replay which Barnsley lost 2–0. The following season they finished 19th in the league and were forced to apply for re-election to the Football League, which they gratefully received.

The 1911–12 season however saw a revitalised side, and they once again proved unbeatable in the FA Cup rounds as well as being on good form in the league this time (while still not quite able to earn promotion into the top tier of English football). They went past Birmingham City, Leicester Fosse, Bolton Wanderers, a quarter-final against cup holders Bradford City and a notoriously brutal semi-final against Swindon Town. In the finals they played West Bromwich Albion. After the first match ended goal-less, the replay took place at Bramall Lane. Neither side managed to score until the last two minutes of play when Harry Tufnell's last-gap goal won the FA Cup for Barnsley, for the only time in their history. They also finished the league in sixth position, the highest they had yet achieved.

== Wartime and Post-War Barnsley (1913–1959) ==
In the following two seasons they finished the league in fourth and fifth place, not quite managing to reach the top flight, and sat in fourth place when league football was suspended due to the First World War. When the league started again in 1919, the decision to extend the first division to twenty-two teams made it likely that Barnsley would be automatically promoted. However, a ballot was instead called and Arsenal went up in their place (the Arsenal chairman later admitted to some underhand dealings). In 1921–22, Barnsley missed promotion on goal difference, by a single goal. Stoke City needed to win their final game by 3–0 in order to go ahead of Barnsley in the table, which is exactly what they did. It was the closest any team could come to securing promotion to the top flight without actually managing it.

After this disappointment, Barnsley F.C. languished in the Second Division throughout the twenties, achieving a good attacking record but not a defensive one to match it. In the thirties they found themselves sliding between the Second and Third Division, until the football league programme was once again abandoned due to the Second World War. Post-war Barnsley continued in much the same form. Notable players that served the team during this period included George Robledo, Syd 'Skinner' Normanton and Tommy Taylor, who had departed the club by 1953 when they were relegated once again to Division Three, only to be promoted two years later and go back down again in 1959.

== The long, hard road to the top (1960–1995) ==
Throughout the sixties and seventies Barnsley were only a shadow of the team they had once been, and this is remembered as the most disappointing period in the club's history. They now hovered around the Third and Fourth Division, unable to even break into the top two flights of English football. The club saw a resurgence in the late seventies, though, managing to get themselves from Division Four back up to Division Two within two years. Two of the players who contributed to this success were future Sheffield United manager Neil Warnock and future Republic of Ireland international manager Mick McCarthy. Most importantly, though, was the arrival of player–manager Allan Clarke from the hugely successful Leeds United team of the seventies, who rebuilt and completely turned the team around. He was joined on the squad by his Leeds teammate Norman Hunter, who also spent a few years as manager of the club.

The eighties and early nineties saw the club establish themselves as a very strong Division Two side, as they had been in their early history, eventually reaching a position to once again start challenging for a place in the top tier for the very first time.

== Promotion to the Premier League (1996–97) ==
After the end of the 1995–96 season several regular first team players left the club, including Andy Payton who was the leading goalscorer for the club and long-serving defender Owen Archdeacon. Manager Danny Wilson successfully acquired a number of signings in the summer that were to play huge roles, amongst these were the vastly experienced duo Neil Thompson and Paul Wilkinson, as well as youngster Matty Appleby.

Oakwell also gained an international flavour, as Jovo Bosancic and Trinidad and Tobagoa international Clint Marcelle were to sign, with Marcelle's work permit clearing just a couple of days prior to the Red's first game of the season, an away match at West Bromwich Albion. Fortunately, Marcelle was cleared to play and scored the opening goal of the season in a 2–1 victory. Barnsley went on to equal their best start to a season by winning the next four games. Wilson then further improved the team by bringing in Scottish forward John Hendrie, who had partnered Wilkinson at Middlesbrough.

Bolton Wanderers looked increasingly likely to win the league as the season progressed. The Reds played both games against the Trotters relatively early on in the season, with the two games both resulting in 2–2 draws. As the season neared its closing stages, it looked as if either Barnsley or Mark McGhee's Wolverhampton Wanderers would join Bolton.

In Barnsley's final home game of the season, a Yorkshire derby against Bradford City, the team knew a win would be enough to secure promotion to the top tier of English football for the first time in the club's history. The side dominated the game, but led only 1–0 at half time thanks to a Paul Wilkinson goal. With only a few minutes remaining, Clint Marcelle, the man who had scored the opening goal of the season, scored the Red's final goal at home. As the final whistle blew, the fans swarmed onto the pitch amid jubilant celebrations.

The team lost their final game of the season 5–1 away at Oxford United; however the joy of promotion remained throughout the summer and the team later had an open-top bus celebration around the town, culminating at the town hall.

== The Premier League season (1997–98) ==
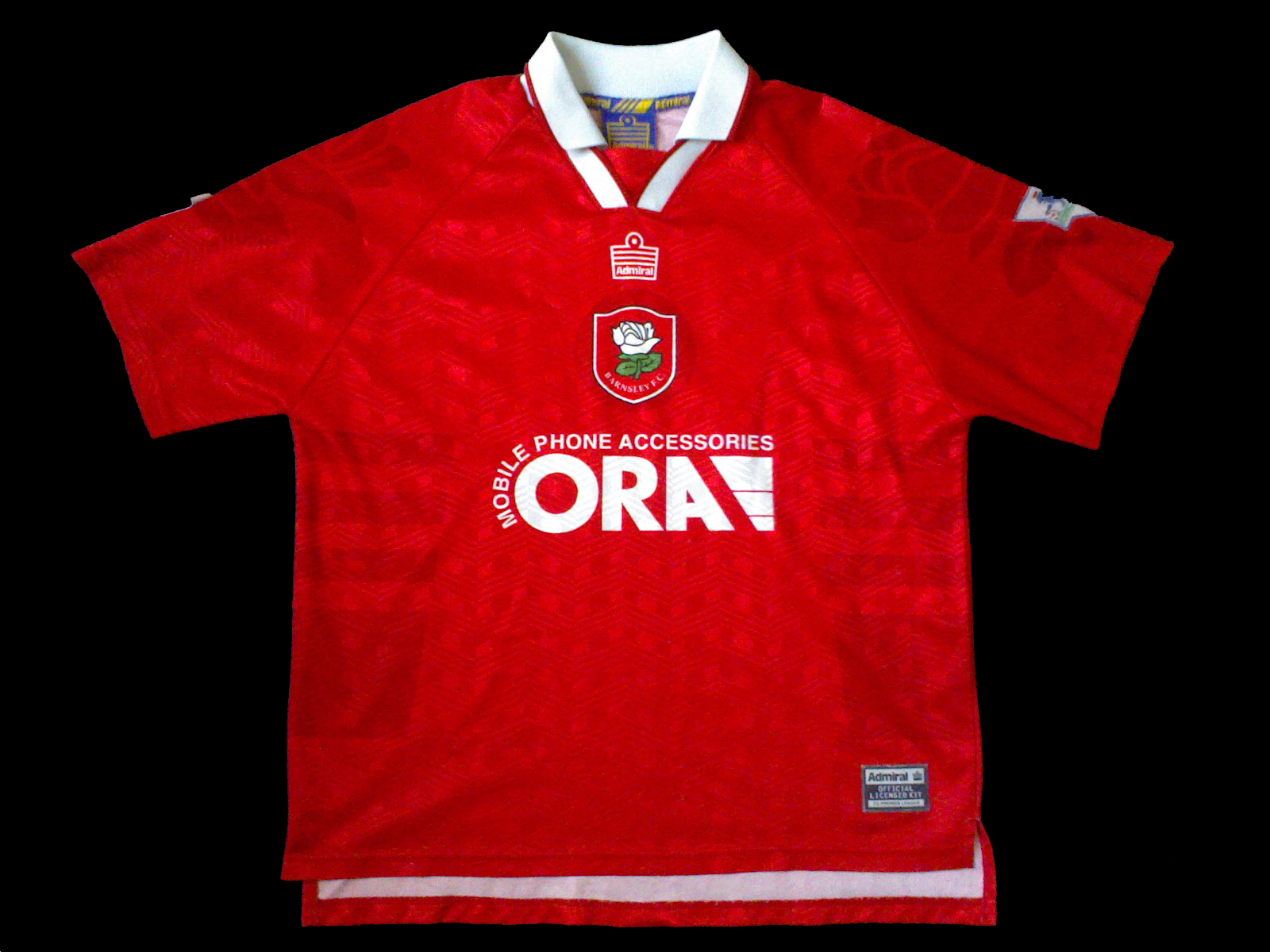
Barnsley's home shirt in their historical Premier League season

The joy of promotion and sense of achievement was mixed with the knowledge that much hard work would have to be done for the club to stay in the top flight. Neil Thompson and Paul Wilkinson left the club, with Wilson bringing in several international calibre players, Slovenia captain Aleš Križan, South African Eric Tinkler, Welshman Darren Barnard and for a club record fee of £1,500,000 Macedonian striker Georgi Hristov. Wilson also brought in a reserve keeper, German Lars Leese from Bayer Leverkusen.

The team got off to a dream start, with Neil Redfearn scoring a ninth-minute goal in the Red's first game, a home contest against West Ham United. Two second half goals however saw the Reds lose. The first victory of the season came away at Selhurst Park, where another goal from Reds skipper Neil Redfearn secured a 1–0 victory over Crystal Palace.

This was followed by a bad run of results, including 6–0 and 5–0 home defeats to Chelsea and Arsenal respectively, alongside a 7–0 thrashing against Manchester United at Old Trafford. Despite this fans continued to enjoy every moment, after going 6 down against Chelsea Barnsley supporters could be heard singing, "We're going to win 7–6".

Wilson moved to strengthen the squad and signed attacking duo Ashley Ward from Derby and Jan Åge Fjørtoft from Sheffield United. Wilson further strengthened the squad by signing central defender Peter Markstedt. One of the highlights of the season was to follow as Barnsley gained a measure of revenge for their 7–0 defeat at Old Trafford. After being drawn against Manchester United in the FA Cup the team played admirably to secure a 1–1 draw. In the replay at Oakwell, two goals by Barnsley youth team graduate Scott Jones and a goal for John Hendrie were enough to dump Manchester United out of the FA Cup 3–2. Barnsley went on to lose 3–1 away at Newcastle United.

Another of the highlights of the season was a 1–0 victory at Anfield against Liverpool, with an Ashley Ward goal the difference between the two sides. It was the return fixture at Oakwell however, which will be remembered for longer. After a good run of results for Barnsley, hopes were emerging that the team could avoid relegation. With the scores at 1–1 referee Gary Wilard sent off Barnsley players Darren Barnard and Chris Morgan. Liverpool then took the lead 2–1; the crowd was in a hostile mood yet not out of control. Then, for no apparent reason Wilard left the pitch without informing his assistants as to why. After a short break Wilard returned and Barnsley created an equaliser. In the last few seconds of the game Wilard sent off another Barnsley player, Darren Sheridan, and Liverpool scored a winner from the resulting free kick.

The results went downhill and Barnsley only won one of their final nine games, a 2–1 victory over local rivals Sheffield Wednesday. Barnsley were relegated after a 1–0 defeat at Leicester City and played their final game of the season at home against Manchester United, which they lost 2–0. In the summer to follow manager Danny Wilson departed Barnsley to join Sheffield Wednesday.

== Pushing for a return to the Premier League (1998–2001) ==
- Squad on 27 November 1998 vs Huddersfield Town (7–1 victory)

With the team looking to bounce back to the Premier League John Hendrie was named manager. The Red's promotion hopes were hampered when they lost influential captain Neil Redfearn who was sold to Charlton Athletic after making 338 first team appearances for Barnsley. The season was mostly unremarkable as Barnsley finished 13th in the table. One of the highlights of the season was a 7–1 home victory against local rivals Huddersfield Town. This was the only time new signing Craig Hignett and Ashley Ward played together, with Ward leaving for Blackburn. After the season Barnsley lost yet more players from the promotion season, with solid defender Arjan de Zeeuw and attacking midfield player Clint Marcelle both leaving the club. Goalkeeper David Watson also suffered an injury mid-season that later ended his career.

Before the start of the 1999–2000 season, Barnsley sacked manager John Hendrie, who had failed to make the team into genuine promotion contenders. A replacement was found in Dave Bassett, who had achieved considerable success with other clubs and who had won the 1997–98 Division One Championship with Nottingham Forest. Bassett was active in the transfer market, bringing in Neil Shipperley from Forest for £750,000 and former England international Geoff Thomas.

As the season drew to a close, results went against Barnsley leaving second place an impossibility but they did secure fourth position, and a tie against Birmingham City, a team who had soundly defeated Barnsley just two months before. The first leg was played at St. Andrew's and Barnsley delivered the greatest winning margin by any team playing away, emerging as 4–0 victors.

The return leg at Oakwell appeared to be a formality; however, Barnsley ended up losing 2–1. Playoff fever gripped the town as Barnsley had never before been to Wembley, and roughly, 35,000 fans made their way to see the Tykes play under the famous twin towers and try to beat Ipswich Town, a feat they had failed to do all season. Barnsley took the lead through attacking midfielder Craig Hignett but Ipswich equalised. Shortly before half time Barnsley were awarded a penalty but Darren Barnard saw his spot kick saved by future Arsenal, Everton and England goalkeeper Richard Wright.

After half time Ipswich scored two goals. With Barnsley going on the attack, they were awarded another penalty, taken this time by Craig Hignett. With time running out, Bassett introduced Georgi Hristov to the game as a substitute, who later saw a header at goal spectacularly saved by Wright. As time ran out Barnsley conceded a fourth, condemning them to another season in Division One. In the summer that followed a number of influential players left the club and the next season mid‑table obscurity followed.

== Relegation to the Third Tier (2001–02) ==
The 2001–02 season saw a division that was particularly interesting as it contained three other teams from South Yorkshire, meaning the derby games against Sheffield United, Sheffield Wednesday and Rotherham United would play an important part in final standings.

The first game of the season was an away visit to freshly relegated Bradford City, with the Reds suffering a humiliating 4–0 defeat, including goals by ex-Barnsley player Ashley Ward and former Sheffield Wednesday player Benito Carbone. This was to set a tone for Barnsley who did not pick up a victory away from home until they played bottom of the table Stockport County on Boxing Day. After a mediocre start with Barnsley reaching eleventh by mid-September results started to go downhill and the team found themselves hovering around the relegation zone.

Barnsley were dragged back into the mire, with Barnsley's away form being particularly terrible the Reds were reliant upon home victories to get valuable points. Despite a battling effort it came down to the final home game of the season, with Barnsley needing a victory against Norwich City to stave off relegation. On 13 April, Barnsley lost 2–0, and were relegated outside the top two flights of English football for the first time in over twenty years. Barnsley finished the disastrous season off with a victory away at Wimbledon, only their second away win all season.

== Administration and takeover ==
Relegation and the collapse of ITV Digital led to the club being placed into administration on 3 October 2002 by the then owner John Dennis. The remaining finance for the day-to-day running of the club was scheduled to run out on 30 November, providing a deadline by which a new owner for the club had to be found.

Ten days before the club was due to close an announcement was made by administrator Matthew Dunham that the then Mayor of Barnsley, Peter Doyle was in line to complete a takeover of the club. This was confirmed on 3 December but ratification by the league was not confirmed for some months. Many fans however were unhappy with Doyle's motives in running the club, as he was seen as a surprise buyer. Fans staged walkouts during games to protest and ultimately followed in the steps of former Wimbledon fans by creating a breakaway club, AFC Barnsley, though they folded towards the end of the 2005–06 season due to the salvation of the main club.

In the summer of 2003, the sale of the club appeared imminent on numerous occasions. Initially a deal was agreed between Doyle and Sean Lewis, a California based businessman. This led to the departure of manager Glyn Hodges on 5 July with former Stoke boss Gudjon Thordarson given the job as part of the deal. The deal was ultimately rejected by the Football League who refused to ratify it because they did not believe the takeover would clear the club's debts.

On 4 September 2003, former Leeds United chairman Peter Ridsdale announced that he had purchased the club alongside local businessman Patrick Cryne. Ridsdale ultimately stepped down on 24 December 2004 after a conflict of interests within the board, with the club's finances becoming increasingly uncomfortable. Ownership was transferred to board member Gordon Shepherd, with Cryne remaining in a prominent position at the club.

== Stuck in the Third Tier (2002–2005) ==
Barnsley's troubles in fighting administration were matched by their struggles on the field, as Barnsley's form continued to be mixed. However, Barnsley were in a position to secure their position and prevent relegation for a second successive season with their final home game of the season against Brentford. After a goalless 92 minutes, Isaiah Rankin scored a dramatic injury time winner, meaning Barnsley could travel to promoted Wigan Athletic knowing they were secure.

The following summer was a time of confusion, with Icelandic Gudjon Thordarson ultimately ending up as manager, the first manager from outside the UK to become Barnsley manager. Barnsley were only given permission to play in the league 24 hours before their first game of the season. Barnsley started off well and made their best start to a season since their promotion to the Premier League, occupying top spot on occasions. Results continued to go well and Barnsley maintained hopes of an automatic promotion spot, and at the least a play-off position. However, after only one win in January and February, Thordarson was sacked after a humiliating 6–1 defeat away at Grimsby Town. Paul Hart was brought in as manager, however he was unable to push Barnsley into promotion contenders, and Barnsley finished in twelfth position, with only four victories since December.

A poor start saw Barnsley slip down to 20th in the league at the start of September, and Barnsley continued to hover around the relegation places until December. Barnsley's form dipped again and after a poor February, Hart was sacked, despite his final game in charge being a 4–1 victory over Torquay United. Academy coach Andy Ritchie was named temporary manager. He started well, and earned the Manager of the Month accolade for March, his first month in charge. Barnsley finished strongly, despite a 5–0 loss away to Port Vale and finished in 13th place.

== Promotion to the Championship (2005–06) ==
The Reds continued their strong form in the new season, as Barnsley finished fifth in the league, resulting in a playoff tie with local rivals Huddersfield Town.

After losing the first leg at home 1–0 it appeared that Barnsley were resigned to another season in League One. The Reds took a vocal support of 4,000 fans to the away leg at the Galpharm Stadium, and the ground erupted as Paul Hayes placed home a penalty. Huddersfield went on to equalise but goals from captain Paul Reid and a 77th-minute winner from ex-Manchester United trainee Daniel Nardiello put the Reds into a playoff final against Swansea City who had beaten third placed Brentford.

The final was played at the Millennium Stadium, Cardiff on 27 May 2006 in front of a crowd of 55,419. Barnsley took the lead through a Paul Hayes opener but Swansea replied with goals from ex-Red Rory Fallon and Andy Robinson following a blunder by keeper Nick Colgan. Barnsley were not to be out-done and the vocal fan support continued throughout the game. A Barnsley equaliser came from a Daniel Nardiello free kick, and chances were traded back and forth for the rest of the game and extra-time.

The match was decided on penalties, with Nick Colgan going from villain to hero and saving the winning penalty from Alan Tate, to give the Reds a 4–3 shootout victory and a place in the Championship to boot.

== Championship years and FA Cup success (2006–2014) ==
Barnsley's Championship survival was secured in their first season back in the second tier, as they finished in 20th place.

- Barnsley line up against Chelsea on 8 March 2008

With the departure of six first team players (Daniel Nardiello, Paul Hayes, Antony Kay, Paul Heckingbottom, Neil Austin and Marc Richards) the following summer, manager Simon Davey dipped heavily into the summer transfer market and ultimately brought in fourteen new players, the majority of whom were foreign.

Barnsley had a very positive start to the season, surpassing expectations and finding themselves in the top six of the Football League Championship with ten games played. Barnsley's form finally began to stutter through December and January, when they went for eight league games without a victory and dropped to 16th in the table. They did, however, beat both Blackpool and Southend United in the FA Cup to secure passage to the last sixteen.

Barnsley continued to maintain their lower mid-table position in the Championship, unable to put a winning streak together. On 16 February, the team travelled to Anfield to play Liverpool in the 5th round of the FA Cup and pulled off a surprise 2–1 victory, with a strong defensive display and a 'Man of the Match', 'Player of the Round' performance from loaned keeper Luke Steele (who was brought in at the last minute for cup-tied Tony Warner). After conceding a goal in the first half, it was Stephen Foster who equalised in the second and captain Brian Howard who scored the last-gasp winner which allowed them to progress to the quarter-finals for the first time since 1999, where they faced Chelsea at Oakwell. Here, the Tykes put in a sensational performance against the FA Cup holders and Kayode Odejayi's second-half header (only his second goal of the season) was enough to put the Yorkshire side into the semi-final for the first time since they won the Cup in 1912. With Portsmouth the only Premier League side remaining in the competition, what had begun as a shock result at Anfield had now developed into a genuine chance to reclaim their FA Cup glory, and when they were drawn against Cardiff City in the semi-finals at Wembley, a repeat of the historic final against West Bromwich Albion was well on the cards. However, Cardiff managed to beat Barnsley with a 9th-minute goal from Joe Ledley, to go through to the final against Portsmouth after they themselves, had beaten West Brom to reach the final.

The Reds did however again secure Championship football for next season, finishing the season in 18th place.

A notable feat was achieved in 2008–09, when manager Simon Davey fielded the youngest ever player in the history of the Football League. Reuben Noble-Lazarus was just 15 years and 45 days old, when he came on as a substitute against Ipswich Town at Portman Road.

Barnsley stayed six more seasons in the second tier, not finishing higher than 17th (2010–11) in this period, until relegation back to the third tier in 2013–14, when they finished in 23rd place.

== Promotion to the Championship and FL Trophy winners (2014–2016) ==
Barnsley were promoted back to the Football League Championship in their second season in the third tier, after beating Millwall 3–1 in the League One play-off final at Wembley Stadium. Barnsley also won the Football League Trophy that season, after beating Oxford United 3–2 in the final.

== Back in the Championship, new shareholders and ownership at Barnsley Football Club (2016–present) ==
Barnsley's league performance from 1898 until the present

In September 2016, Barnsley were caught up in an ongoing scandal in English football, with assistant manager Tommy Wright alleged to have accepted "bungs" in exchange for working as an ambassador for a third-party player ownership consortium. Wright was initially suspended before being sacked by Barnsley on 28 September.

On 19 December 2017, it was announced that Patrick Cyrne and family, had agreed of new shareholders and co-owners of Barnsley Football Club to consortium led by Chien Lee of NewCity Capital and Pacific Media Group, which is led by Paul Conway and Grace Hung. Billy Beane and Neerav Parekh, who will also be investing in Barnsley Football Club with Chien Lee and Pacific Media Group. Chien Lee has 80% shares and the Cyrne family has 20% shares of ownership of Barnsley Football club.

Despite the new shareholders, Barnsley were relegated to League One for the second time in five seasons in 2017–18, when a heroic last matchday of the season saw them finish 22nd. Barnsley were promoted back to the Championship the following season, and managed to avoid relegation from the Championship in 2019–20. In 2020–21, under the management of Valérien Ismaël, Barnsley finished in fifth place and made it to the EFL Championship Play-offs for the first time in 24 years, with the youngest squad and one of the smallest budgets in the league. The Wall Street Journal called Barnsley a "Moneyball experiment".

Prior to the 2021–22 season, Markus Schopp was revealed as the new head coach. In November 2021, Schopp was sacked after a run of seven straight defeats. Three weeks later Poya Asbaghi was appointed as the new head coach. Fortunes improved little as Barnsley were relegated from the 2021–22 EFL Championship following a 2–1 defeat against Huddersfield Town. Asbaghi left the club by mutual consent shortly afterwards. On 15 June 2022, Michael Duff was appointed head coach of Barnsley on a three-year deal.

In May 2022, it was revealed that Pacific Media Group did not actually own all the shares they claimed to own, and were simply a nominee for a group of 4 investors who owned 20% of the club. Following this revelation, Neerav Parekh purchased the shares of 2 of the investors, while Matt Edmonds purchased the shares of the 4th investor. Following the purchases and further equity raises, the new ownership of the club is now understood to be split between Neerav Parekh (55.59%), the Cryne family (21.30%), Julie Anne Quay and Matt Edmonds (10%), Chien Lee (9.20%), and Conway’s company Pacific Media Group (3.91%). With this reconstituted shareholding and a loss of majority control, Paul Conway, Chien Lee, Grace Hung and Dickson Lee were voted off the board of Barnsley Football Club, and were replaced by Jean Cryne and Julie Anne Quay in May 2022. In July 2023, the EFL charged Barnsley with 5 breaches of the EFL Regulations related to the ownership of the club under Conway and Lee's tenure, whilst also charging Conway and Lee individually with causing these breaches in regulations.
