= 1997–98 Barnsley F.C. season =

Barnsley
1997–98 season
- Chairman: John Dennis
- Manager: Danny Wilson
- Stadium: Oakwell
- FA Premier League: 19th (relegated)
- FA Cup: Quarter-final
- League Cup: Third round
- Top goalscorer: League: Neil Redfearn (10); All: Neil Redfearn (14)
- Highest home attendance: 18,694 (vs. Manchester United, 10 May)
- Lowest home attendance: 17,102 (vs. Wimbledon, 28 February)
- Average home league attendance: 18,449

During the 1997–98 English football season, Barnsley competed in the FA Premier League.

== Season summary ==
1997–98 was the first top-flight season in Barnsley's 102-year history, and, despite some courageous performances, their stay among the elite lasted just one season. They suffered from horrendous defeats and the leakiest defensive record in the division, conceding 82 goals. Their start to the season was OK, losing two and winning two of their first four games at Crystal Palace and against Bolton Wanderers. However, they were in the bottom three virtually for the remainder of the season after the 1–4 defeat at Wimbledon, though they did enjoy some success in the FA Cup, knocking out Manchester United in the fifth round before bowing out to eventual runners-up Newcastle United in the quarter-final. Their relegation was confirmed a few weeks later, and manager Danny Wilson then moved to South Yorkshire rivals Sheffield Wednesday. 35-year-old striker John Hendrie was appointed player-manager following Wilson's departure.

== Final league table ==
Pos	Team	Pld	W	D	L	GF	GA	GD	Pts	Qualification or relegation
16	Sheffield Wednesday	38	12	8	18	52	67	−15	44	
17	Everton	38	9	13	16	41	56	−15	40	
18	Bolton Wanderers (R)	38	9	13	16	41	61	−20	40	Relegation to the Football League First Division
19	Barnsley (R)	38	10	5	23	37	82	−45	35	Relegation to the Football League First Division
20	Crystal Palace (Note: Crystal Palace qualified for the 1998 Intertoto Cup as they were the only English team who applied.) (R)	38	8	9	21	37	71	−34	33	Intertoto Cup third round and relegation to the First Division

Source: Premier League
Rules for classification: 1) points; 2) goal difference; 3) number of goals scored.
(R) Relegated
Notes:

Results summary

Overall								Home						Away					
Pld	W	D	L	GF	GA	GD	Pts	W	D	L	GF	GA	GD	W	D	L	GF	GA	GD
38	10	5	23	37	82	−45	35	7	4	8	25	35	−10	3	1	15	12	47	−35

Source: 1997–98 FA Premier League table

Results by round

Round	1	2	3	4	5	6	7	8	9	10	11	12	13	14	15	16	17	18	19	20	21	22	23	24	25	26	27	28	29	30	31	32	33	34	35	36	37	38
Ground	H	A	H	H	A	H	A	A	H	A	H	A	H	A	A	H	A	H	A	A	H	A	H	A	H	A	H	A	H	H	A	A	H	A	H	H	A	H
Result	L	W	L	W	L	L	L	L	L	L	W	L	D	L	W	L	L	D	L	D	W	L	W	L	D	L	W	W	W	L	L	L	W	L	D	L	L	L
Position	15	8	14	10	10	14	17	18	19	20	18	19	19	20	19	19	20	20	20	20	20	20	20	20	20	20	18	18	18	18	18	19	19	19	18	19	19	19

Source: 11v11.com: 1997–98 Barnsley results
A = Away; H = Home; W = Win; D = Draw; L = Loss

== Results ==
Barnsley's score comes first

=== Legend ===
Win	Draw	Loss

=== FA Premier League ===
Date	Opponent	Venue	Result	Attendance	Scorers
9 August 1997	West Ham United	H	1–2	18,667	Redfearn
12 August 1997	Crystal Palace	A	1–0	21,547	Redfearn
24 August 1997	Chelsea	H	0–6	18,170	
27 August 1997	Bolton Wanderers	H	2–1	18,661	Tinkler, Hristov
30 August 1997	Derby County	A	0–1	27,232	
13 September 1997	Aston Villa	H	0–3	18,649	
20 September 1997	Everton	A	2–4	32,659	Redfearn, Barnard
23 September 1997	Wimbledon	A	1–4	7,668	Tinkler
27 September 1997	Leicester City	H	0–2	18,660	
4 October 1997	Arsenal	A	0–5	38,049	
20 October 1997	Coventry City	H	2–0	17,463	Ward, Redfearn (pen)
25 October 1997	Manchester United	A	0–7	55,142	
1 November 1997	Blackburn Rovers	H	1–1	18,665	Bosančić
8 November 1997	Southampton	A	1–4	15,018	Bosančić (pen)
22 November 1997	Liverpool	A	1–0	41,011	Ward
29 November 1997	Leeds United	H	2–3	18,690	Liddell, Ward
8 December 1997	Sheffield Wednesday	A	1–2	29,086	Redfearn
13 December 1997	Newcastle United	H	2–2	18,687	Redfearn, Hendrie
20 December 1997	Tottenham Hotspur	A	0–3	28,232	
26 December 1997	Bolton Wanderers	A	1–1	25,000	Hristov
28 December 1997	Derby County	H	1–0	18,686	Ward
10 January 1998	West Ham United	A	0–6	23,714	
17 January 1998	Crystal Palace	H	1–0	17,819	Ward
31 January 1998	Chelsea	A	0–2	34,442	
7 February 1998	Everton	H	2–2	18,672	Fjørtoft, Barnard
21 February 1998	Coventry City	A	0–1	20,265	
28 February 1998	Wimbledon	H	2–1	17,102	Fjørtoft (2)
11 March 1998	Aston Villa	A	1–0	29,519	Ward
14 March 1998	Southampton	H	4–3	18,368	Ward, Jones, Fjørtoft, Redfearn (pen)
28 March 1998	Liverpool	H	2–3	18,684	Redfearn (2)
31 March 1998	Blackburn Rovers	A	1–2	24,179	Hristov
4 April 1998	Leeds United	A	1–2	37,749	Hristov
11 April 1998	Sheffield Wednesday	H	2–1	18,692	Ward, Fjørtoft
13 April 1998	Newcastle United	A	1–2	36,534	Fjørtoft
18 April 1998	Tottenham Hotspur	H	1–1	18,692	Redfearn
25 April 1998	Arsenal	H	0–2	18,691	
2 May 1998	Leicester City	A	0–1	21,293	
10 May 1998	Manchester United	H	0–2	18,694	

=== FA Cup ===
Round	Date	Opponent	Venue	Result	Attendance	Goalscorers
R3	3 January 1998	Bolton Wanderers	H	1–0	15,042	Barnard
R4	24 January 1998	Tottenham Hotspur	A	1–1	28,722	Redfearn (pen)
R4R	4 February 1998	Tottenham Hotspur	H	3–1	18,220	Ward, Redfearn, Barnard
R5	15 February 1998	Manchester United	A	1–1	54,700	Hendrie
R5R	25 February 1998	Manchester United	H	3–2	18,655	Hendrie, Jones (2)
QF	8 March 1998	Newcastle United	A	1–3	36,695	Liddell

=== League Cup ===
Round	Date	Opponent	Venue	Result	Attendance	Goalscorers
R2 1st Leg	16 September 1997	Chesterfield	A	2–1	6,318	Redfearn (pen), Ward
R2 2nd Leg	30 September 1997	Chesterfield	H	4–1 (won 6–2 on agg)	8,417	Liddell, Redfearn, Sheridan, Hristov
R3	14 October 1997	Southampton	H	1–2	9,019	Liddell

== Players ==
=== First-team squad ===
Squad at end of season

Note: Flags indicate national team as defined under FIFA eligibility rules; some limited exceptions apply. Players may hold more than one non-FIFA nationality.

No.	Pos.	Nation	Player
1	GK	ENG	David Watson
2	DF	ENG	Nicky Eaden
3	MF	ENG	Matty Appleby
4	MF	ENG	Darren Sheridan
5	DF	ENG	Adie Moses
6	DF	NED	Arjan de Zeeuw
7	FW	SCO	John Hendrie
8	MF	ENG	Neil Redfearn (captain)
10	FW	TRI	Clint Marcelle
11	DF	ENG	Neil Thompson
12	MF	SCO	Andy Liddell
13	GK	GER	Lars Leese
14	MF	ENG	Martin Bullock
15	MF	YUG	Jovo Bosančić

No.	Pos.	Nation	Player
17	FW	NED	Laurens ten Heuvel
18	DF	ENG	Scott Jones
19	DF	ENG	Peter Shirtliff
21	MF	RSA	Eric Tinkler
22	FW	MKD	Georgi Hristov
23	DF	SVN	Aleš Križan
24	DF	WAL	Darren Barnard
25	FW	ENG	Ashley Ward
26	GK	ENG	Tony Bullock
27	DF	ENG	Chris Morgan
28	FW	ENG	Luke Beckett
29	DF	SWE	Peter Markstedt
30	FW	NOR	Jan Åge Fjørtoft
31	MF	ENG	Sean McClare

=== Left club during season ===
Note: Flags indicate national team as defined under FIFA eligibility rules; some limited exceptions apply. Players may hold more than one non-FIFA nationality.

No.	Pos.	Nation	Player
9	FW	ENG	Paul Wilkinson (to Millwall)
16	DF	ENG	Steve Davis (to Oxford United)

No.	Pos.	Nation	Player
20	FW	ENG	Dave Regis (to Leyton Orient)

=== Reserve squad ===
Note: Flags indicate national team as defined under FIFA eligibility rules; some limited exceptions apply. Players may hold more than one non-FIFA nationality.

No.	Pos.	Nation	Player
—	DF	NZL	Jonathan Perry
—	MF	ENG	Paul Bagshaw
—	MF	ENG	Rory Prendergast

No.	Pos.	Nation	Player
—	FW	ENG	Andrew Gregory
—	FW	ENG	Karl Rose

== Transfers ==
=== In ===
Date	Pos	Name	From	Fee
1 June 1997	GK	Lars Leese	Bayer Leverkusen	£250,000
13 June 1997	FW	Georgi Hristov	FK Partizan	£1,500,000
1 July 1997	MF	Eric Tinkler	Cagliari	£650,000
2 July 1997	FW	Aleš Križan	NK Maribor	£500,000
5 August 1997	DF	Darren Barnard	Bristol City	£750,000
4 September 1997	FW	Ashley Ward	Derby County	£1,300,000
31 October 1997	GK	Paul Heritage	Sheffield United	Signed
15 January 1998	FW	Jan Åge Fjørtoft	Sheffield United	£800,000

=== Out ===
Date	Pos	Name	To	Fee
1 August 1997	MF	Carel van der Velden	Scarborough	Free transfer
1 August 1997	GK	Glyn Clyde	Macclesfield Town	Free transfer
1 August 1997	FW	Darran Clyde	Gateshead	Undisclosed
18 September 1997	FW	Paul Wilkinson	Millwall	£150,000
31 October 1997	FW	Dave Regis	Leyton Orient	Free transfer
18 March 1998	DF	Steve Davis	Oxford United	Signed
15 May 1998	FW	Luke Beckett	Chester City	Free transfer

Transfers in: ▼£5,750,000
Transfers out: ▲£150,000
Total spending: ▼£5,600,000

== Statistics ==
=== Appearances and goals ===
No.	Pos	Nat	Player	Total		FA Premier League		FA Cup		League Cup	
No.	Pos	Nat	Player	Apps	Goals	Apps	Goals	Apps	Goals	Apps	Goals
Goalkeepers
1	GK	(England) ENG	David Watson	37	0	30	0	6	0	1	0
13	GK	(Germany) GER	Lars Leese	11	0	8+1	0	0	0	2	0
Defenders
2	DF	(England) ENG	Nicky Eaden	42	0	32+3	0	5	0	2	0
5	DF	(England) ENG	Adie Moses	43	0	32+3	0	6	0	2	0
6	DF	(Netherlands) NED	Arjan De Zeeuw	33	0	26	0	5	0	2	0
11	DF	(England) ENG	Neil Thompson	4	0	3	0	0	0	1	0
18	DF	(England) ENG	Scott Jones	13	3	12	1	1	2	0	0
19	DF	(England) ENG	Peter Shirtliff	5	0	4	0	0	0	1	0
23	DF	(Slovenia) SVN	Aleš Križan	16	0	12	0	1	0	3	0
24	DF	(Wales) WAL	Darren Barnard	43	4	33+2	2	5	2	3	0
27	DF	(England) ENG	Chris Morgan	14	0	10+1	0	3	0	0	0
29	DF	(Sweden) SWE	Peter Markstedt	8	0	6+1	0	1	0	0	0
Midfielders
3	MF	(England) ENG	Matty Appleby	19	0	13+2	0	1+1	0	1+1	0
4	MF	(England) ENG	Darren Sheridan	33	1	20+6	0	3+1	0	3	1
8	MF	(England) ENG	Neil Redfearn	46	14	37	10	6	2	3	2
14	MF	(England) ENG	Martin Bullock	40	0	23+10	0	3+2	0	1+1	0
15	MF	(Federal Republic of Yugoslavia) YUG	Jovo Bosančić	21	2	13+4	2	3+1	0	0	0
21	MF	(South Africa) RSA	Eric Tinkler	29	2	21+4	2	2	0	2	0
Forwards
7	FW	(Scotland) SCO	John Hendrie	24	3	7+13	1	4	2	0	0
9	FW	(England) ENG	Paul Wilkinson	4	0	3+1	0	0	0	0	0
10	FW	(Trinidad and Tobago) TRI	Clint Marcelle	26	0	9+11	0	3+1	0	0+2	0
12	FW	(Scotland) SCO	Andy Liddell	33	4	13+13	1	1+4	1	2	2
17	FW	(Netherlands) NED	Laurens ten Heuvel	3	0	0+2	0	0	0	0+1	0
22	FW	(North Macedonia) MKD	Georgi Hristov	28	5	11+12	4	1+1	0	1+2	1
25	FW	(England) ENG	Ashley Ward	38	10	28+1	8	6	1	3	1
30	FW	(Norway) NOR	Jan Åge Fjørtoft	15	6	12+3	6	0	0	0	0
Players transferred out during the season

Last updated: 15 May 1998
Source: Competitions
