= 1998–99 Barnsley F.C. season =

Barnsley
1998–99 season
- Chairman: John Dennis
- Manager: John Hendrie (until 19 April); Eric Winstanley (caretaker from 19 April)
- Stadium: Oakwell
- First Division: 13th
- FA Cup: Quarter finals
- League Cup: Fourth round
- Top goalscorer: League: Ward (12); All: Ward (15)
- Average home league attendance: 16,269

During the 1998–99 English football season, Barnsley F.C. competed in the Football League First Division.

== Season summary ==
In the summer, Danny Wilson departed Barnsley to join Sheffield Wednesday, and with the team looking to bounce back to the Premier League John Hendrie was named manager.

The Red's promotion hopes were hampered when they lost influential captain Neil Redfearn who was sold to Charlton Athletic after making 338 first team appearances for Barnsley.

The season was mostly unremarkable in terms of results and on 19 April 1999, Hendrie was sacked with the club nowhere near the top six and Hendrie's assistant Eric Winstanley took caretaker charge for the remaining games of the season. Barnsley then went on to finish a disappointing campaign in 13th place. One of the highlights of the season was a 7–1 home victory against local rivals Huddersfield Town. This was the only time new signing Craig Hignett and Ashley Ward played together, with Ward leaving for Blackburn. After the season Barnsley lost yet more players from the promotion season, with solid defender Arjan de Zeeuw and attacking midfield player Clint Marcelle both leaving the club. Goalkeeper David Watson also suffered an injury mid-season that later ended his career.

== Final league table ==
Pos	Team	Pld	W	D	L	GF	GA	GD	Pts
11	Grimsby Town	46	17	10	19	40	52	−12	61
12	West Bromwich Albion	46	16	11	19	69	76	−7	59
13	Barnsley	46	14	17	15	59	56	+3	59
14	Crystal Palace	46	14	16	16	58	71	−13	58
15	Tranmere Rovers	46	12	20	14	63	61	+2	56

Rules for classification: 1) Points; 2) Goals scored; 3) Goal difference

== Results ==
Barnsley's score comes first

=== Legend ===
Win	Draw	Loss

=== Football League First Division ===
Date	Opponent	Venue	Result	Attendance	Scorers
8 August 1998	West Bromwich Albion	H	2–2	18,114	de Zeeuw (2)
15 August 1998	Crewe Alexandra	A	1–3	5,289	McClare
21 August 1998	Stockport County	H	1–1	16,377	Fjørtoft
29 August 1998	Birmingham City	A	0–0	19,825	
31 August 1998	Oxford United	H	1–0	15,328	Hendrie
8 September 1998	Norwich City	H	1–3	15,695	Ward
12 September 1998	Grimsby Town	A	2–1	8,149	Ward (2)
19 September 1998	Crystal Palace	H	4–0	15,597	Ward (2), McClare, Fjørtoft
26 September 1998	Bradford City	A	1–2	15,887	Ward
29 September 1998	Bristol City	A	1–1	12,005	Sheridan
3 October 1998	Bolton Wanderers	H	2–2	17,362	Ward, van der Laan
11 October 1998	Port Vale	H	0–2	16,195	
17 October 1998	Sheffield United	A	1–1	23,180	Fjørtoft
20 October 1998	Tranmere Rovers	A	0–3	5,194	
24 October 1998	Portsmouth	H	2–1	15,152	Ward, Barnard
31 October 1998	Wolverhampton Wanderers	A	1–1	20,714	Ward (pen)
4 November 1998	Queens Park Rangers	A	1–2	8,218	Bullock
7 November 1998	Bury	H	1–1	15,115	Ward
14 November 1998	Ipswich Town	H	0–1	15,966	
21 November 1998	Sunderland	A	3–2	40,231	Ward, Dyer, Barnard (pen)
27 November 1998	Huddersfield Town	H	7–1	16,648	Dyer (2), Hignett (2), Tinkler, Ward, Barnard
5 December 1998	Watford	A	0–0	10,165	
12 December 1998	Ipswich Town	A	2–0	16,021	McClare, Turner
19 December 1998	Swindon Town	H	1–3	15,342	Barnard (pen)
26 December 1998	Stockport County	A	1–0	10,263	de Zeeuw
28 December 1998	Queens Park Rangers	H	1–0	17,083	Hignett
9 January 1999	West Bromwich Albion	A	0–2	15,029	
16 January 1999	Birmingham City	H	0–0	17,114	
30 January 1999	Oxford United	A	0–1	6,174	
6 February 1999	Crewe Alexandra	H	2–2	15,377	Tinkler, de Zeeuw
16 February 1999	Norwich City	A	0–0	13,232	
20 February 1999	Grimsby Town	H	0–0	16,343	
28 February 1999	Crystal Palace	A	0–1	17,021	
3 March 1999	Bradford City	H	0–1	16,866	
9 March 1999	Bolton Wanderers	A	3–3	16,537	Hignett (2), Jones
13 March 1999	Bury	A	0–0	4,696	
20 March 1999	Wolverhampton Wanderers	H	2–3	16,587	Richards (own goal), Jones
23 March 1999	Bristol City	H	2–0	14,733	Dyer, Hignett
28 March 1999	Portsmouth	A	3–1	13,337	Hignett, Whitbread (own goal), Dyer
3 April 1999	Sheffield United	H	2–1	17,566	Hignett (2)
5 April 1999	Port Vale	A	0–1	5,968	
10 April 1999	Tranmere Rovers	H	1–1	15,133	Dyer
16 April 1999	Sunderland	H	1–3	17,390	Sheron
24 April 1999	Huddersfield Town	A	1–0	15,353	Sheron
1 May 1999	Watford	H	2–2	17,098	Eaden, Tinkler
9 May 1999	Swindon Town	A	3–1	8,182	Jones, Bullock, Dyer

=== FA Cup ===
Round	Date	Opponent	Venue	Result	Attendance	Goalscorers
R3	2 January 1999	Swindon Town	A	0–0	8,016	
R3R	19 January 1999	Swindon Town	H	3–1	10,510	McClare, Bullock, Hignett
R4	23 January 1999	Bournemouth	H	3–1	11,982	Sheridan, Hignett, Bullock
R5	13 February 1999	Bristol Rovers	H	4–1	17,508	Hignett (3), Dyer
QF	16 March 1999	Tottenham Hotspur	H	0–1	18,793	

=== League Cup ===
Round	Date	Opponent	Venue	Result	Attendance	Goalscorers
R1 1st Leg	12 August 1998	Scarborough	A	1–0	3,064	Ward
R1 2nd Leg	18 August 1998	Scarborough	H	3–0 (won 4–0 on agg)	5,099	Fjørtoft, van der Laan, Eaden
R2 1st Leg	15 September 1998	Reading	H	3–0	7,840	Barnard, Fjørtoft (2)
R2 2nd Leg	23 September 1998	Reading	A	1–1 (won 4–1 on agg)	6,983	Ward
R3	27 October 1998	Bournemouth	H	2–1	8,560	Ward (pen), Fjørtoft
R4	10 November 1998	Luton Town	A	0–1	8,435	

== Squad ==
Note: Flags indicate national team as defined under FIFA eligibility rules; some limited exceptions apply. Players may hold more than one non-FIFA nationality.

No.	Pos.	Nation	Player
-	GK	ENG	Tony Bullock
-	DF	ENG	Nicky Eaden
-	DF	NED	Arjan de Zeeuw
-	DF	ENG	Adie Moses
-	DF	ENG	Scott Jones
-	MF	ENG	Matty Appleby
-	MF	ENG	Martin Bullock
-	MF	ENG	Kevin Richardson
-	MF	ENG	Sean McClare
-	FW	ENG	Bruce Dyer
-	FW	ENG	Craig Hignett
-	DF	WAL	Darren Barnard
-	MF	RSA	Eric Tinkler
-	GK	ENG	David Watson
-	DF	ENG	Chris Morgan
-	MF	ENG	Darren Sheridan
-	FW	ENG	Mike Sheron
-	MF	NED	Robin van der Laan
-	GK	GER	Lars Leese
-	FW	SCO	John Hendrie (player-manager)

No.	Pos.	Nation	Player
-	MF	WAL	Clayton Blackmore
-	FW	ENG	Mike Turner
-	FW	TRI	Clint Marcelle
-	FW	ENG	Karl Rose
-	FW	MKD	Georgi Hristov
-	DF	SWE	Peter Markstedt
-	MF	ESP	Pirri (on loan from CP Mérida)
-	DF	SVN	Aleš Križan
-	FW	ENG	Jon Parkin
-	DF	IRL	Brian O'Callaghan
-	FW	ENG	Andrew Gregory
-	DF	SCO	James Dudgeon
-	DF	ENG	Chris Barker
-	MF	BRA	Fumaça
-	FW	NZL	Rory Fallon
-	MF	ENG	Paul Bagshaw
-	MF	ENG	Marc Heckingbottom
-	FW	ENG	Paul Kennedy
-	GK	ENG	Richard Siddall

=== Left club during the season ===
Note: Flags indicate national team as defined under FIFA eligibility rules; some limited exceptions apply. Players may hold more than one non-FIFA nationality.

No.	Pos.	Nation	Player
-	FW	JAM	Deon Burton (on loan from Derby County)
-	FW	SCO	Andy Liddell (to Wigan Athletic)
-	MF	IRL	Alan Moore (on loan from Middlesbrough)

No.	Pos.	Nation	Player
-	FW	NOR	Jan Åge Fjørtoft (to Eintracht Frankfurt)
-	FW	ENG	Don Goodman (on loan from Sanfrecce Hiroshima)
-	FW	ENG	Ashley Ward (to Blackburn Rovers)
