= 1999–2000 Barnsley F.C. season =

Barnsley
1999–2000 season
- Chairman: John Dennis
- Manager: Dave Bassett
- Stadium: Oakwell
- First Division: 4th (qualified for play-offs)
- Play-offs: Runners-up
- FA Cup: Third round
- League Cup: Fourth round
- Top goalscorer: Craig Hignett (19)
- Average home league attendance: 15,412

During the 1999–2000 English football season, Barnsley F.C. competed in the Football League First Division.

== Season summary ==
Barnsley qualified for the play-offs and, after thrashing Birmingham City 5–2 on aggregate (with a 2–1 defeat at Oakwell insufficient for Birmingham to best Barnsley over two legs after the Tykes' 4–0 win at St Andrew's), reached the final at Wembley to face Ipswich Town. Barnsley took the lead through an own goal by Ipswich goalkeeper Richard Wright, but goals from Tony Mowbray, Richard Naylor and Marcus Stewart put Ipswich 3–1 up. A Craig Hignett penalty with twelve minutes left gave Barnsley hope, until Martijn Reuser's goal on the stroke of injury time. The 4–2 defeat condemned Barnsley to a second consecutive season in the First Division.

Barnsley, who were the Football League's top scorers with 88 goals, could have achieved automatic promotion, but for their poor defence that conceded 67 goals – the worst of any in the top twelve of the First Division, and joint fourth-worst in the division.

== Final league table ==
Pos	Team	Pld	W	D	L	GF	GA	GD	Pts	Qualification or relegation
2	Manchester City (P)	46	26	11	9	78	40	+38	89	Promotion to the Premier League
3	Ipswich Town (O, P)	46	25	12	9	71	42	+29	87	Qualification for the First Division play-offs
4	Barnsley	46	24	10	12	88	67	+21	82	Qualification for the First Division play-offs
5	Birmingham City	46	22	11	13	65	44	+21	77	Qualification for the First Division play-offs
6	Bolton Wanderers	46	21	13	12	69	50	+19	76	Qualification for the First Division play-offs

Rules for classification: 1) Points; 2) Goal difference; 3) Goals scored
(O) Play-off winners; (P) Promoted

== Results ==
Barnsley's score comes first

=== Legend ===
Win	Draw	Loss

=== Football League First Division ===
Date	Opponent	Venue	Result	Attendance	Scorers
7 August 1999	Charlton Athletic	A	1–3	19,268	Barnard
14 August 1999	Crystal Palace	H	2–3	14,461	Barnard (pen), Sheron
21 August 1999	Blackburn Rovers	A	2–1	19,537	Hristov, Shipperley
28 August 1999	Portsmouth	H	6–0	13,792	Van Der Lann (2), Barnard, Appleby (2), Hignett
30 August 1999	Ipswich Town	A	1–6	18,037	McClare
3 September 1999	Tranmere Rovers	H	3–0	12,865	Sheron, Dyer, McClare
10 September 1999	Stockport County	H	2–1	13,173	Sheron (2)
18 September 1999	Bolton Wanderers	A	2–2	14,621	Hignett, Barnard
25 September 1999	Huddersfield Town	H	4–2	17,765	Barnard (2 pens), Sheron, Hignett
1 October 1999	Nottingham Forest	A	0–3	15,255	
16 October 1999	Wolverhampton Wanderers	H	1–2	14,923	Hignett
19 October 1999	Swindon Town	H	1–0	12,026	Thomas
23 October 1999	Crewe Alexandra	A	1–0	5,421	Hignett
26 October 1999	Huddersfield Town	A	1–2	15,764	Sheron
30 October 1999	Nottingham Forest	H	1–0	14,727	Hignett (pen)
6 November 1999	Sheffield United	H	2–0	16,301	Shipperley (2)
13 November 1999	Fulham	A	3–1	10,634	Symons (own goal), Dyer, Van Der Lann
20 November 1999	Birmingham City	H	2–1	14,520	Tinkler, Hignett (pen)
24 November 1999	Manchester City	A	1–3	32,692	Thomas
27 November 1999	Queens Park Rangers	A	2–2	11,054	Thomas, Eaden
4 December 1999	Charlton Athletic	H	1–1	14,553	Chettle
18 December 1999	Walsall	H	3–2	13,300	Hignett (3)
26 December 1999	Grimsby Town	A	3–0	8,742	Hignett (2), Appleby
28 December 1999	Port Vale	H	3–1	16,855	Tinkler, Barnard, Shipperley
3 January 2000	West Bromwich Albion	A	2–0	13,411	Barnard (2)
8 January 2000	Norwich City	A	2–2	14,039	Dyer, Hignett
15 January 2000	Crystal Palace	A	2–0	14,225	Dyer, Barnard (pen)
22 January 2000	Blackburn Rovers	H	5–1	18,088	Dyer (2), Hignett, Shipperley, Barnard
29 January 2000	Portsmouth	A	0–3	12,201	
5 February 2000	Ipswich Town	H	0–2	17,601	
11 February 2000	Tranmere Rovers	H	2–2	7,127	Shipperley, Thomas
19 February 2000	Queens Park Rangers	H	1–1	14,212	Hignett (pen)
26 February 2000	Bolton Wanderers	H	1–1	14,604	Tinkler
3 March 2000	Stockport County	A	3–1	6,386	Hristov (2), Shipperley
7 March 2000	Sheffield United	A	3–3	22,376	Hristov, Barnard (pen), Shipperley
11 March 2000	Manchester City	H	2–1	22,650	Curtis, Hignett
18 March 2000	Birmingham City	A	1–3	25,108	Hignett
21 March 2000	Fulham	H	1–0	14,262	Shipperley
27 March 2000	Grimsby Town	H	3–0	14,613	Tinkler, Shipperley, Hignett
1 April 2000	Walsall	A	4–1	7,218	Sheron (2), Shipperley, Appleby
8 April 2000	West Bromwich Albion	H	2–2	16,329	Barnard, Shipperley
15 April 2000	Port Vale	A	2–2	5,918	Hignett, Curtis
22 April 2000	Wolverhampton Wanderers	A	0–2	21,251	
24 April 2000	Norwich City	H	2–1	15,253	Chettle, Shipperley
29 April 2000	Swindon Town	A	2–1	6,151	Appleby, Sheron
7 May 2000	Crewe Alexandra	H	0–2	17,611	

=== First Division play-offs ===
Round	Date	Opponent	Venue	Result	Attendance	Goalscorers
SF 1st Leg	13 May 2000	Birmingham City	A	4–0	26,492	Shipperley, Dyer (2), Hignett
SF 2nd Leg	18 May 2000	Birmingham City	H	1–2 (won 5–2 on agg)	19,050	Dyer
F	29 May 2000	Ipswich Town	N	2–4	73,427	Wright (own goal), Hignett

=== FA Cup ===
Round	Date	Opponent	Venue	Result	Attendance	Goalscorers
R3	11 December 1999	Wimbledon	A	0–1	4,505	

=== League Cup ===
Round	Date	Opponent	Venue	Result	Attendance	Goalscorers
R1 1st Leg	10 August 1999	Lincoln City	A	4–2	3,426	Shipperley, Van Der Lann, Eaden
R1 2nd Leg	24 August 1999	Lincoln City	H	2–2 (won 6–4 on agg)	7,047	Sheron, Eaden
R2 1st Leg	14 September 1999	Stockport County	H	1–1	6,966	Barnard
R2 2nd Leg	21 September 1999	Stockport County	A	3–3 (won on away goals)	3,332	Hristov (2), Jones
R3	12 October 1999	Bradford City	A	3–2	8,583	Sheron, Morgan, Barnard (pen)
R4	30 November 1999	Tranmere Rovers	A	0–4	7,039	

== Squad ==
Note: Flags indicate national team as defined under FIFA eligibility rules; some limited exceptions apply. Players may hold more than one non-FIFA nationality.

No.	Pos.	Nation	Player
1	GK	ENG	David Watson
2	DF	ENG	Nicky Eaden
3	MF	ENG	Matty Appleby
5	DF	ENG	Adie Moses
6	DF	ENG	Scott Jones
7	MF	RSA	Eric Tinkler
8	MF	ENG	Craig Hignett
9	FW	ENG	Neil Shipperley
10	FW	ENG	Bruce Dyer (Note: Dyer was born in Redbridge, England, and represented them at U-21 level, but played a friendly game for Montserrat against Ashford Town in September 2007.)
11	DF	WAL	Darren Barnard
12	FW	ENG	Mike Sheron
13	GK	ENG	Tony Bullock
14	MF	ENG	Martin Bullock
15	MF	NED	Robin Van Der Laan
16	MF	ENG	Geoff Thomas
17	MF	ENG	Sean McClare

No.	Pos.	Nation	Player
18	DF	ENG	Chris Morgan
19	FW	MKD	Georgi Hristov
20	GK	ENG	Kevin Miller
21	FW	ENG	Mike Turner
22	FW	ENG	Karl Rose
25	DF	TRI	Kevin Austin
26	GK	ENG	Richard Siddall
27	DF	ENG	Chris Barker
28	DF	SCO	Keith Brown
30	DF	ENG	Jon Parkin
31	DF	ENG	Steve Chettle
34	DF	ENG	John Curtis (on loan from Manchester United)
35	FW	WAL	Andy Evans
36	DF	ENG	James Dudgeon
37	GK	ENG	Leigh Walker

=== Left club during season ===
Note: Flags indicate national team as defined under FIFA eligibility rules; some limited exceptions apply. Players may hold more than one non-FIFA nationality.

No.	Pos.	Nation	Player
4	MF	ENG	Kevin Richardson (to Blackpool)
20	DF	SWE	Peter Markstedt (to Helsingborgs IF)
23	FW	TRI	Clint Marcelle (released)
24	DF	SVN	Aleš Križan (to NK Maribor)

No.	Pos.	Nation	Player
29	DF	ENG	Gavin Bassinder (to Mansfield Town)
32	DF	SWE	Robert Bengtsson (on loan from Västra Frölunda)
32	DF	ENG	Mark Jackson (on loan from Leeds United)
33	DF	ENG	Dave Tuttle (to Millwall)

== Transfers ==
=== In ===
- Kevin Austin – Lincoln City
