= 2000 Football League First Division play-off final =

Association football match in London

- The match took place at Wembley Stadium.
- Event: 1999–2000 Football League First Division
Barnsley	Ipswich Town
2	4
- Date: 29 May 2000
- Venue: Wembley Stadium, London
- Referee: Terry Heilbron (County Durham)
- Attendance: 73,427
- Weather: Sunny

The 2000 Football League First Division play-off final was an association football match played at Wembley Stadium on 29 May 2000, to determine the third and final team to gain promotion from the First Division to the Premiership in the 1999–2000 season. Ipswich Town faced Barnsley in the last domestic competitive fixture to be played at the original Wembley Stadium.

The match was both teams' first appearance in a First Division play-off final. It was the first time Barnsley had been in the play-offs, having been relegated to the First Division after the 1997–98 season, and finishing mid-table the following season. Ipswich made the play-offs for the fourth consecutive season, but this was the first time they had advanced further than the semifinals. Watched by a crowd of more than 73,000, Ipswich Town came from behind to win 4–2 and secured promotion to the Premiership.

== Route to the final ==
Football League First Division final table, leading positions
Pos	Team	Pld	W	D	L	GF	GA	GD	Pts
1	Charlton Athletic	46	27	10	9	79	45	+34	91
2	Manchester City	46	26	11	9	78	40	+38	89
3	Ipswich Town	46	25	12	9	71	42	+29	87
4	Barnsley	46	24	10	12	88	67	+21	82
5	Birmingham City	46	22	11	13	65	44	+21	77
6	Bolton Wanderers	46	21	13	12	69	50	+19	76

Ipswich finished the regular 1999–2000 Football League season in third place in the First Division, the second tier of the English football league system, one place ahead of Barnsley. Both therefore missed out on the two automatic places for promotion to the Premiership and instead took part in the play-offs to determine the third promoted team. It was Ipswich's fourth year running in the playoffs. Ipswich finished two points behind Manchester City (who were promoted in second place) and four behind league winners Charlton Athletic. Barnsley were in fourth place in the league, a further five points behind Ipswich – they also finished as the highest scorers in the division with 88 goals.

On the final day of the league season Ipswich played Walsall, and won 2–0. At one point, after David Johnson scored his first goal, second place Manchester City were trailing to Blackburn, meaning that Ipswich would qualify for promotion automatically. However, City eventually scored four goals to win the match and secure promotion, meaning Ipswich needed to seek promotion through the play-offs.

In the play-off semi-finals, Ipswich faced sixth-placed Bolton Wanderers who had beaten them in the semifinal the previous year. After being 2–0 down in the first leg away at the Reebok Stadium, Marcus Stewart scored two to secure a 2–2 draw. In the second leg at Portman Road, Jim Magilton scored a hat-trick as Ipswich won 5–3, winning 7–5 on aggregate. Barnsley won the first leg 4–0 away against Birmingham City at St Andrew's. Despite losing the second leg 2–1 at Oakwell, they reached the final 5–2 on aggregate.

Barnsley			Round	Ipswich
Opponent	Result	Legs	Semi-finals	Opponent	Result	Legs
Birmingham City	5–2	4–0 away; 1–2 home		Bolton Wanderers	7–5	2–2 away; 5–3 (aet) home

== Match ==
=== Background ===
This was Ipswich's fourth consecutive appearance in the play-offs, and fifth in total. It was the first time they had progressed to the final, having lost in the play-off semifinals for the past three years, to Sheffield United in the 1997 play-offs, Charlton Athletic in the 1998 play-offs, and Bolton Wanderers in the 1999 play-offs. Ipswich's previous appearance at Wembley was in the 1978 FA Charity Shield against Nottingham Forest. It was Barnsley's first appearance in both the play-offs and at Wembley. During the regular season, Ipswich had beaten Barnsley 6–1 at Portman Road and 2–0 at Oakwell, and Ipswich striker Marcus Stewart stated before the game that he would have "picked Barnsley ... perhaps they'll be thinking we're their bogey side". Barnsley had played 55 games during the regular season and scored 106 goals, with Craig Hignett (20 goals), Neil Shipperley (15), Darren Barnard (15) and Mike Sheron (11) all in double figures for goals scored. Ipswich were going into the match without their fan's and player's player of the season: James Scowcroft was out with a hamstring injury. Dutchman Martijn Reuser was slated to replace him in the starting line-up, and John McGreal came back into the team following an ankle injury.

The play-off final was the last domestic competitive fixture to be played at the original Wembley Stadium. Match referee Terry Heilbron became the first person to officiate in four play-off finals, with the 2000 final being his second consecutive final, and his last before retirement. Promotion from the First Division to the Premiership was estimated to be worth up to £12 million.

=== First half ===
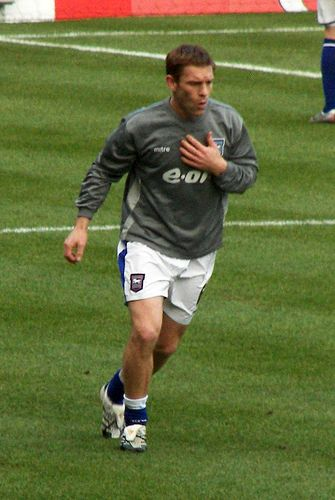
Richard Naylor was an early first-half substitute for Ipswich.

Ipswich kicked off and immediately sought to press Barnsley, with David Johnson making a heavy challenge on goalkeeper Kevin Miller but injuring himself in the process. After just five minutes, an own goal from Ipswich's goalkeeper Richard Wright put the Yorkshire club ahead: a Craig Hignett strike from 32 yards (29 m) rebounded off the bar, hit Wright on the arm and was deflected into the net. Ipswich's first shot came on nine minutes from Mark Venus and gradually the East Anglian side regained confidence. The teams exchanged challenges and chances until, in the twenty-second minute of the game, Johnson, who had picked up a shoulder injury after challenging the goalkeeper in the early stages of the match, was replaced by substitute Richard Naylor. Barnsley's Hignett struck a shot in the 25th minute which passed narrowly outside the post with opposition goalkeeper Wright beaten, and two minutes later a shot from Ipswich's Matt Holland was blocked for a corner. Played to the far post by Jim Magilton, the ball was headed past Miller by Ipswich's 36-year-old defender Tony Mowbray to level the score. The goal sparked a period of Ipswich dominance with attempts from Holland and Naylor being saved by Miller. One minute before half-time, Richard Wright's challenge on Hignett was deemed a penalty: Darren Barnard stepped up to take the kick which Wright saved to his right and the half ended 1–1.

=== Second half ===
The second half started scrappily but with shots from both sides, firstly Ipswich's Holland and then Barnsley's Bruce Dyer. Six minutes in, Ipswich's Marcus Stewart flicked a long ball on to Naylor who delayed his shot before passing it past Miller to make the score 2–1. Removing his shirt to celebrate, Naylor was shown the yellow card by referee Heilbron. Further good work from Naylor saw his cross poorly cleared by Keith Brown, only for Jermaine Wright to miss the resulting chance to score. Two minutes later, in the 57th minute, Naylor played a ball out wide to Jamie Clapham who crossed for Stewart to head in Ipswich's third goal. Barnsley made their first substitution of the game on 60 minutes with South African Eric Tinkler being replaced by Geoff Thomas. Ipswich narrowly missed extending their lead as Mowbray headed a Magilton cross wide, before Barnsley's second substitution, this time Macedonian international striker Georgi Hristov coming on to replace Dyer. After a chance for Hristov, Barnsley's third and final substitution was made in the 71st minute, John Curtis being substituted for Nicky Eaden. Magilton's 72nd minute free kick was deflected off the Barnsley wall, and a Neil Shipperley shot was saved by Wright, before a second Barnsley penalty was awarded in the 77th minute. Mowbray was adjudged to have fouled Thomas as he moved through the box, and Hignett converted the penalty taking the score to 3–2 with just over ten minutes remaining. With Ipswich beginning to appear nervous, Burley substituted Stewart off for Reuser in the 83rd minute. Barnsley came close to equalising a minute later with Wright saving a point-blank header from Hristov, and then two minutes after that, catching another Barnsley opportunity. An appeal for a penalty was turned down as Reuser went down in the area with two minutes remaining. Not long after, Jermaine Wright was substituted off for Fabian Wilnis. In the last minute of regular time, and with Barnsley sending their team forward, a break for Ipswich saw Reuser pick up the ball in his own half before running half the length of the pitch and striking the ball from the edge of the Barnsley area into the roof of the net, taking the score to 4–2. Five minutes of injury time were played out with no further incident.

=== Details ===
29 May 2000
15:00 BST

Barnsley	2–4	Ipswich Town
Wright 6' (o.g.); Hignett 78' (pen.)	Report	Mowbray 28'; Naylor 52'; Stewart 58'; Reuser 90'

Wembley, London
Attendance: 73,427
Referee: Terry Heilbron

Barnsley	Ipswich Town

GK	20	(England) Kevin Miller
RB	34	(England) John Curtis		(substituted off) 71'
CB	18	(England) Chris Morgan
CB	31	(England) Steve Chettle
LB	11	(Wales) Darren Barnard
RM	8	(England) Craig Hignett
CM	28	(Scotland) Keith Brown
CM	7	(South Africa) Eric Tinkler (c)		(substituted off) 60'
LM	3	(England) Matty Appleby	Yellow card
CF	10	(England) Bruce Dyer		(substituted off) 64'
CF	9	(England) Neil Shipperley
Substitutes:
DF	2	(England) Nicky Eaden		(substituted on) 71'
DF	6	(England) Scott Jones
MF	16	(England) Geoff Thomas		(substituted on) 60'
FW	12	(England) Mike Sheron
FW	19	(North Macedonia) Georgi Hristov		(substituted on) 64'
Manager:
(England) Dave Bassett

GK	1	(England) Richard Wright
RWB	25	(England) Gary Croft
CB	24	(England) John McGreal
CB	5	(England) Tony Mowbray
CB	6	(England) Mark Venus
LWB	3	(England) Jamie Clapham
CM	8	(Republic of Ireland) Matt Holland (c)
CM	11	(Northern Ireland) Jim Magilton
CM	14	(England) Jermaine Wright		(substituted off) 89'
CF	9	(Jamaica) David Johnson		(substituted off) 22'
CF	27	(England) Marcus Stewart		(substituted off) 83'
Substitutes:
GK	21	(Republic of Ireland) Keith Branagan
DF	2	(Netherlands) Fabian Wilnis		(substituted on) 89'
MF	17	(England) Wayne Brown
MF	30	(Netherlands) Martijn Reuser		(substituted on) 83'
FW	12	(England) Richard Naylor	Yellow card	(substituted on) 22'
Manager:
(Scotland) George Burley

Match rules

- 90 minutes.
- 30 minutes of extra-time if necessary.
- Penalty shootout if scores still level.
- 5 named substitutes.
- Maximum of 3 substitutions.

In a change from Barnsley's traditional kit of red top and white shorts, for the play-off final they wore an all-red strip.

== Post-match ==
After the game, Ipswich manager George Burley remarked "We are ready for the Premiership ... We have got a fantastic squad of players, and they are quality players". Barnsley manager Dave Bassett conceded that "overall Ipswich deserved it over the 90 minutes. We didn't play as well as we can do, but all credit to Ipswich". Ipswich striker Marcus Stewart claimed it was "the best day of his life ... apart from [his] kid being born" but paid tribute to the efforts of his teammate Richard Wright whose save at 3–2, Stewart noted, "won the game for us. He was the saviour." Simon Barnes of The Times described the match as a "classic play-off final", noting that he had watched it at a hotel in Ipswich, adding "I didn't think such hysteria was legally permitted on licensed premises".

The following season, Ipswich finished fifth in the 2000–01 FA Premier League, qualifying for the 2001–02 UEFA Cup, and went out of the 2000–01 Football League Cup at the semifinal stage. George Burley was recognised as the Premier League Manager of the Season, the first recipient of the award for 26 years who had not won the league. Barnsley ended their subsequent season 16th in the First Division.

== See also ==
- 2000 Football League Second Division play-off final
- 2000 Football League Third Division play-off final
