= Georgi Hristov =

Georgi Hristov may refer to:

== Sports ==
- Georgi Hristov (footballer, born 1985), Bulgarian football forward
- Georgi Hristov (footballer, born February 1978), Bulgarian football goalkeeper
- Georgi Hristov (footballer, born 1976), Macedonian footballer
