= Chris Morgan (footballer) =

English footballer (born 1977)

Personal information
- Full name: Christopher Paul Morgan
- Date of birth: 9 November 1977 (age 48)
- Place of birth: Barnsley, England
- Height: 5 ft 10 in (1.78 m)
- Position: Defender

Youth career
- Hoyland Common Falcons

Senior career*
Years	Team	Apps	(Gls)
1996–2003	Barnsley	185	(7)
2003–2012	Sheffield United	247	(14)
Total		432	(21)

Managerial career
- 2013: Sheffield United (caretaker)
- 2013: Sheffield United (caretaker)
- 2017: Port Vale (caretaker)
- * Club domestic league appearances and goals

Christopher Paul Morgan (born 9 November 1977) is an English former professional footballer and football coach. An "uncompromising" defender, he scored 24 goals in 491 league and cup appearances in a 16-year career in English football.

He began his career at Barnsley, making his debut for the club in the Premier League in January 1998. Barnsley were relegated at the end of the season, and he would stay on at the club to make a total of 212 league and cup appearances across six seasons, scoring eight goals. He signed with Sheffield United in July 2003 and was soon appointed club captain. He was named the club's Player of the Year in 2004. He helped the club to secure promotion out of the Championship in 2005–06, though United's stay in the Premier League lasted only one season. He scored 16 goals in 279 league and cup appearances in nine seasons at Bramall Lane. He was sent off six times each for Barnsley and Sheffield United, holding the club record for red cards at both clubs.

He retired due to injury in July 2012 and went on to coach at Sheffield United, serving the club as caretaker manager over two separate spells in 2013. He then joined Chesterfield as first-team coach in December 2015 and Port Vale as a coach in March 2017.

== Playing career ==
=== Barnsley ===
Morgan attended Penistone Grammar School and played Sunday league football for Hoyland Common Falcons. He began his career at Barnsley, and made his first-team debut under Danny Wilson in a 6–0 defeat to West Ham United in a Premier League tie at Upton Park on 10 January 1998. He was one of three "Tykes" players sent off in a 3–2 defeat to Liverpool at Oakwell on 28 March after his arm appeared to make contact with Michael Owen's head. He ended the 1997–98 season with 11 Premier League and three FA Cup appearances to his name as Barnsley were relegated in 19th-place. He played 19 First Division games under John Hendrie's stewardship in the 1998–99 campaign, and was in a 3–1 home defeat to Norwich City on 8 September.

He established himself as a key first-team player under Dave Bassett and was named as the club's Player of the Year in the 1999–2000 season, playing a total of 45 games, including three appearances in the play-offs as Barnsley reached the play-off final at Wembley, where they lost 4–2 to Ipswich Town. He also scored his first goal in professional football in a 3–2 League Cup victory over Bradford City at Valley Parade on 12 October. He made 45 appearances in the 2000–01 season. He scored the only goal of the game against Burnley in caretaker manager Eric Winstanley's first game in charge on Boxing day. He was also sent off twice, firstly for a bad foul on Birmingham City's David Holdsworth in a 4–1 defeat at St Andrew's on 28 August and secondly for a professional foul on Ian Moore in a 2–1 defeat to Burnley at Turf Moor on 20 January. Late in 2000 he was also linked with a move to Bobby Robson's Newcastle United However, this never materialised.

He scored four goals in 45 appearances in the 2001–02 campaign as Barnsley were relegated in 23rd-place after going through three managers in Nigel Spackman, Glyn Hodges and Steve Parkin; his goals came in victories over Sheffield Wednesday and Stockport County and draws with Burnley and Rotherham United. He also received the fifth and sixth red cards of his career, in defeats away to Wolverhampton Wanderers and Crewe Alexandra, leaving him as the club record-holder for red cards. He scored two goals in 36 Second Division matches in the 2002–03 season, with both goals coming in a 3–2 home victory over Cardiff City on 9 November.

=== Sheffield United ===
Morgan signed for First Division club Sheffield United on a free transfer in July 2003. He made his debut in a 0–0 draw with Gillingham at Bramall Lane on 9 August. He was sent off for violent conduct on his seventh appearance for the club, during a 3–1 defeat to Nottingham Forest at the City Ground on 13 September. He scored his first goal for the "Blades" with a volley in a 3–0 FA Cup fourth round win at Nottingham Forest on 25 January 2004. He ended the 2003–04 season with 36 appearances to his name, and added to his goal tally with a header against Bradford City on 20 March. He was voted as United's Player of the Year for 2004 and following the departure of Rob Page in the summer, Morgan was named as the club's new captain by manager Neil Warnock. He made 47 appearances in the 2004–05 campaign, scoring three goals and receiving two red cards. He was sent off once and scored four goals in 42 games in the 2005–06 season as United secured promotion to the Premier League after finishing as runners-up to Reading. His fourth goal of the season came on the final day of the season as United celebrated promotion with a 1–0 home victory over Crystal Palace.

Morgan made 24 Premier League appearances in the 2006–07 season, scoring once in a 2–1 home win over Charlton Athletic on 2 December. However, United were relegated on goal difference after losing 2–1 at home to Wigan Athletic on the final day of the season. He played 30 games of the 2007–08 campaign under Bryan Robson and Kevin Blackwell, and was twice sent off for receiving two bookable offences in wins over Preston North End and Hull City. This took Morgan on to six red cards at the club, giving him the distinction of becoming the club's all-time most sent off player.

On 8 November 2008, during a 2–1 defeat at former club Barnsley, Morgan elbowed Iain Hume as he was waiting for an aerial ball, and Hume suffered a fractured skull as a result whilst Morgan received only a yellow card. Hume underwent emergency surgery and spent 48 hours in the high-dependency unit of a Manchester hospital with life-threatening injuries. The Football Association chose not to charge Morgan as referee Andy D'Urso had shown Morgan a yellow card at the time of the incident; this was despite Barnsley Central MP Eric Illsley calling an Early day motion in Parliament for the FA to review their decision. Barnsley and Hume considered taking legal action against Morgan, who described the period since the incident as "a test of character". Morgan went on to make a total of 50 appearances throughout the 2008–09 campaign, helping the club to qualify for the play-offs with a third-place finish, However, they lost 1–0 to Burnley in the play-off final at Wembley.

He featured 40 times during the 2009–10 campaign, as United finished two places outside the play-offs. He played nine games at the start of the 2010–11 season under Gary Speed, making his final appearance in professional football in a 1–0 home defeat to Coventry City on 30 October. In July 2012, during the Blades' pre-season tour of Malta, Morgan announced his retirement from professional football as he had not appeared for the first-team for almost two years due to a long-standing cruciate ligament problem and was now an established member of the coaching staff at Bramall Lane.

== Style of play ==
Morgan was described by The Yorkshire Post as a "granite-hard, uncompromising defender". In November 2008, he severely injured Barnsley striker and Canadian international Iain Hume with an elbow to the head. Hume sustained a fractured skull and internal bleeding. He was sent off six times each for Barnsley and Sheffield United, holding the club record for red cards at both clubs.

== Coaching career ==
Morgan became Sheffield United's reserve team coach shortly after sustaining a serious knee injury in October 2010. During the 2011–12 season, while still a registered player but unable to play due to injury, he led United's reserves to the Central League title. In April 2013, Morgan was appointed as caretaker-manager for the remainder of the 2012–13 season after the departure of manager Danny Wilson. Despite United winning Morgan's first game in charge, results did not significantly improve and they failed to clinch promotion, losing to Yeovil Town in the semi-final of the League One play-offs. Despite publicly expressing his desire to take on the role on a permanent basis, Morgan was overlooked for the post of full-time manager in favour of former Scotland defender David Weir. Weir's brief reign was ended on 11 October, at which point Morgan resumed his role as caretaker manager. He worked as first-team coach under new boss Nigel Clough, before going on to coach the under-21 side after Nigel Adkins took charge in the summer of 2015.

On 30 December 2015, Sheffield United announced that they had "reluctantly" released Morgan, and that he would be joining Chesterfield as first-team coach under manager Danny Wilson. Wilson and Morgan were sacked in January 2017. He joined the coaching staff at Port Vale two months later, where former teammate Michael Brown was caretaker manager. On 16 September, Brown was sacked following seven games without a win, and Morgan and David Kelly were installed as caretaker managers. The duo took charge of four games, before both men left the club once Neil Aspin was appointed on 4 October.

== Personal life ==
Morgan was appointed inaugural Chairman of the Sheffield United Former Players' Association in November 2015.

In February 2018, Morgan joined a high-profile agency Stellar Group to work as a football intermediary.

== Career statistics ==
=== Playing statistics ===
Appearances and goals by club, season and competition
Club	Season	League			FA Cup		League Cup		Other		Total	
Club	Season	Division	Apps	Goals	Apps	Goals	Apps	Goals	Apps	Goals	Apps	Goals
Barnsley	1996–97	First Division	0	0	0	0	0	0	—		0	0
Barnsley	1997–98	Premier League	11	0	3	0	0	0	—		14	0
Barnsley	1998–99	First Division	19	0	1	0	3	0	—		23	0
Barnsley	1999–2000	First Division	37	0	1	0	4	1	3 (Note: Appearance(s) in the play-offs)	0	45	1
Barnsley	2000–01	First Division	40	1	1	0	4	0	—		45	1
Barnsley	2001–02	First Division	42	4	2	0	3	0	—		47	4
Barnsley	2002–03	Second Division	36	2	1	0	0	0	1 (Note: Appearance(s) in the Football League Trophy)	0	38	2
Barnsley	Total		185	7	9	0	14	1	4	0	212	8
Sheffield United	2003–04	First Division	32	1	3	1	1	0	—		36	2
Sheffield United	2004–05	Championship	41	2	3	0	3	1	—		47	3
Sheffield United	2005–06	Championship	39	4	1	0	2	0	—		42	4
Sheffield United	2006–07	Premier League	24	1	0	0	1	0	—		25	1
Sheffield United	2007–08	Championship	25	2	3	0	2	0	—		30	2
Sheffield United	2008–09	Championship	41	2	4	0	2	0	3	0	50	2
Sheffield United	2009–10	Championship	37	2	3	0	0	0	—		40	2
Sheffield United	2010–11	Championship	8	0	0	0	1	0	—		9	0
Sheffield United	2011–12	League One	0	0	0	0	0	0	0	0	0	0
Sheffield United	Total		247	14	17	1	12	1	3	0	279	16
Career total			432	21	26	1	26	2	7	0	491	24

=== Managerial statistics ===
Managerial record by team and tenure
Team	From	To	Matches	Won	Drawn	Lost	Win %	Reference
Sheffield United (caretaker)	12 April 2013	10 June 2013	7	2	2	3	28.57	
Sheffield United (caretaker)	11 October 2013	23 October 2013	3	1	1	1	33.33	
Port Vale (caretaker)	16 September 2017	4 October 2017	4	1	1	2	25.00	
Total			14	4	4	6	28.57	

== Honours ==
Sheffield United

- Football League Championship second-place promotion: 2005–06

Individual

- Barnsley Player of the Year: 1999–2000
- Sheffield United Player of the Year: 2003–04
