= Geoff Hammond (footballer) =

English footballer

Personal information
- Date of birth: 24 March 1950 (age 76)
- Place of birth: Sudbury, Suffolk, England
- Position: Defender

Senior career*
Years	Team	Apps	(Gls)
1970–1974	Ipswich Town	55	(2)
1974–1976	Manchester City	34	(2)
1976–1977	Charlton Athletic	16	(0)
1977	Connecticut Bicentennials	16	(2)
- * Club domestic league appearances and goals

Geoff Hammond is an English former professional footballer who played as a defender.

In 1970, Hammond began his career with Ipswich Town. He transferred to Manchester City in 1976 for two seasons, then moved to Charlton Athletic for one season, before ending his career with the Connecticut Bicentennials of the North American Soccer League in 1977.

Hammond's daughter, Kelly, married Ipswich Town goalkeeper Richard Wright, in 2000.
