= 1998 LG Cup (Iran) =

1998 Second LG Cup
Tournament details
- Host country: Iran
- City: Tehran
- Dates: 20–22 April
- Teams: 4
- Venue: (in 1 host city)

Final positions
- Champions: Hungary (1st title)
- Runners-up: Macedonia
- Third place: Iran
- Fourth place: Jamaica

Tournament statistics
- Top scorer: (North Macedonia) Georgi Hristov

The second LG Cup is an exhibition association football tournament that took place in Iran.

== Participating nations ==
Country	Confederation	FIFA ranking (18 March 1998)
Hungary	UEFA	82
Iran (hosts)	AFC	45
Jamaica	CONCACAF	33
North Macedonia	UEFA	91

== Venues ==
Tehran is located in Iran	Tehran
Tehran is located in Iran	Azadi Stadium
Tehran is located in Iran	Capacity: 100,000

== Results ==
=== Semifinals ===
20 April 1998

Macedonia	2–1	Jamaica
Hristov		Hall

Azadi Stadium, Tehran, Iran
Attendance: 60,000

20 April 1998

Iran	0–2	Hungary
		Korsós; Illés

Azadi Stadium, Tehran, Iran
Attendance: 60,000

=== Third place match ===
22 April 1998

Iran	1–0	Jamaica
Khakpour

Azadi Stadium, Tehran, Iran
Attendance: 50,000

=== Final ===
22 April 1998

Hungary	0–0	Macedonia
Penalties
	4–2

Azadi Stadium, Tehran, Iran
Attendance: 50,000

1998 LG Cup (Iran) winner

Hungary
First title

== Top scorers ==
2 goals

- (North Macedonia) Georgi Hristov

1 goal

- (Hungary) György Korsós
- (Hungary) Béla Illés
- (Iran) Mohammad Khakpour
- (Jamaica) Paul Hall

== See also ==
- LG Cup
