= Mohammad Khakpour =

Iranian footballer and manager

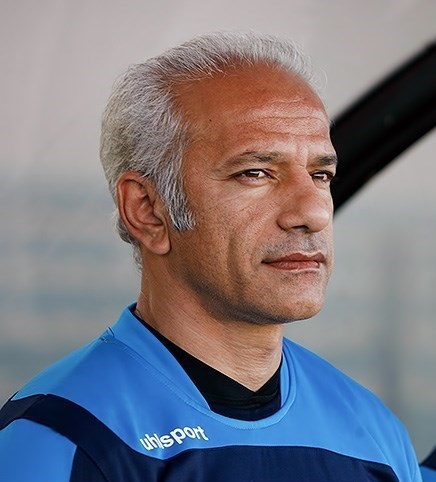
- Khakpour in 2015

Personal information
- Full name: Mohammad Khakpour
- Date of birth: 20 February 1969 (age 57)
- Place of birth: Tehran, Iran
- Height: 1.81 m (5 ft 11 in)
- Position: Defender

Senior career*
Years	Team	Apps	(Gls)
1988–1990	Pas Tehran		
1990–1995	Persepolis		
1995–1996	Geylang United		
1996–1997	Vanspor	13	(0)
1997–1999	Bahman		
1999–2000	MetroStars	19	(0)

International career
1989–2000	Iran	51	(2)

Managerial career
- 2010–2011: Steel Azin
- 2014–2016: Iran U23
- * Club domestic league appearances and goals

Mohammad Khakpour (Persian: محمد خاکپور, born February 20, 1969) is an Iranian former professional footballer and football manager. He primarily played as a defender during his playing career and represented clubs including Pas Tehran and Persepolis. He also represented the Iran national football team from 1989 to 2000 and participated in the 1998 FIFA World Cup.

== Club career ==
Khakpour began his senior career with Pas Tehran in 1988 before moving to Persepolis in 1990. He spent approximately five seasons with Persepolis, remaining with the club until 1995.

In 1995, he moved to Singapore to join Geylang United, beginning his career abroad. After spending the 1995–96 season with Geylang United, he moved to Turkey in 1996 to join Vanspor. During the 1996–97 season, he made 13 league appearances for Vanspor without scoring.

Khakpour returned to Iran in 1997 and played for Bahman until 1999. In 1999, he joined Major League Soccer side MetroStars. He made 14 appearances in 1999 and five in 2000, recording 19 regular-season appearances in total without scoring.

Khakpour retired from professional football after the 2000 season. He subsequently settled in California, United States, where he founded the football club MK Soccer Club.

== International career ==
Khakpour represented the Iran national team from 1989 and continued to make international appearances until 2000. He participated in the 1996 AFC Asian Cup, helping Iran finish third, and was subsequently selected for the tournament's best XI.

In 1997, he played in the Asian qualifying tournament for the 1998 FIFA World Cup, contributing to Iran's qualification for the finals. At the 1998 FIFA World Cup, he started all three of Iran's group-stage matches against Yugoslavia, the United States, and Germany. Iran defeated the United States 2–1 but were eliminated in the group stage.

Khakpour also represented Iran at the 1998 Asian Games, where he contributed to the team winning the gold medal. He scored two goals for the national team in 1998 and retired from international football following a friendly against Mexico on 9 January 2000. His final international record was 50 appearances and two goals.

== Coaching career ==
=== Early career ===
He has a national "A" coaching license. In early August 2006, Khakpour signed as Foolad's assistant coach under Mohammad Mayeli Kohan for the 2006–07 Iran Pro League season, but left the club after Mayeli Kohan's departure from Foolad.

=== Steel Azin ===
He was appointed as the head coach of Steel Azin on 1 December 2010. He resigned from his post on 3 March 2011.

=== Iran under-23 ===
Khakpour was Iran national under-23 football team's technical manager before being appointed as team head coach on 16 December 2014 for the 2016 Olympic qualifiers. He led Iran's under-23 team to win the 2015 WAFF U-23 Championship.

== Career statistics ==
=== International goals ===
#	Date	Venue	Opponent	Score	Result	Competition
1.	22 April 1998	Azadi Stadium, Tehran, Iran	Jamaica	1–0	W	1998 LG Cup
2.	10 December 1998	Suphachalasai Stadium, Bangkok, Thailand	Tajikistan	0–5	W	1998 Asian Games
Correct as of 24 July 2021

=== Manager ===
As of 22 January 2016

Team	From	To	Record							
Team	From	To	G	W	D	L	GF	GA	+/-	Win %
Iran U-23	December 2014	January 2016	23	17	3	3	60	18	+42	73.91

== Personal life ==
On 29 December 2025, Khakpour publicly supported the 2025–2026 Iranian protests on his Instagram, stating: "These people did not come to the streets to cause chaos; they came because they have nothing left to lose except their dignity."

== Honours ==
=== Player ===
Persepolis

- Asian Cup Winners' Cup (1): 1990-91, 1992-93 (Runner-up)
- Tehran Province League (1): 1990-91
- Hazfi Cup (1): 1991-92

Geylang United

- Singapore Premier League (1): 1996 (Champion)

Iran

- Asian Games Gold Medal (1): 1998

=== Individual ===
- AFC Asian Cup Team of the Tournament: 1996

=== Manager ===
- WAFF U23 Championships

(gold) Gold Medal (1): 2015
