= Keith Brown (footballer, born 1979) =

Scottish footballer

Personal information
- Date of birth: 24 December 1979 (age 46)
- Place of birth: Edinburgh, Scotland
- Height: 1.83 m (6 ft 0 in)
- Position: Defender

Senior career*
Years	Team	Apps	(Gls)
1999	Blackburn Rovers	0	(0)
1999	→ Barnsley (loan)	4	(0)
1999–2002	Barnsley	7	(0)
2000	→ Oxford United (loan)	3	(0)
2002	Falkirk	5	(1)
2002–2004	Berwick Rangers	19	(1)
- Whitehill Welfare
Total		38	(2)
- * Club domestic league appearances and goals

Keith Brown (born 24 December 1979) is a Scottish former professional footballer. During his career he made league appearances for Barnsley, Oxford United, Falkirk (where he scored once against Airdrieonians) and Berwick Rangers (where he scored once against Forfar Athletic).

== Career ==
Brown played in the 2000 Football League First Division play-off final for Barnsley where he finished on the losing side. After retiring from the playing side of the game he became a coach and served at Accrington Stanley and Oldham Athletic where he worked until 12 January 2016.
