= Skinner Normanton =

English footballer (1926–1995)

Personal information
- Full name: Sidney Albert Normanton
- Date of birth: 20 August 1926
- Place of birth: Barnsley, England
- Date of death: 1995 (aged 68–69)
- Place of death: Barnsley, England
- Position: Wing-half

Youth career
- Barnsley Main Colliery Welfare

Senior career*
Years	Team	Apps	(Gls)
1947–1954	Barnsley	123	(2)
1954–1955	Halifax Town	13	(0)
1955–	Grimethorpe Athletic		
- * Club domestic league appearances and goals

Sidney Albert Normanton (20 August 1926 – 1995), known as Skinner Normanton, was an English coal miner and part-time footballer who played for Barnsley and Halifax Town of the English Football League.

Throughout his career, Normanton gained a reputation for a highly aggressive and physically uncompromising style of play, earning him a "hard man" image on and off the field. A heavy tackle contested with Alex Forbes in 1952 left Normanton with torn knee ligaments, which hastened the end of his Football League career.

Normanton was brought to wider notice in the writings of Michael Parkinson.
