= Richard Wright (footballer) =

English footballer and coach

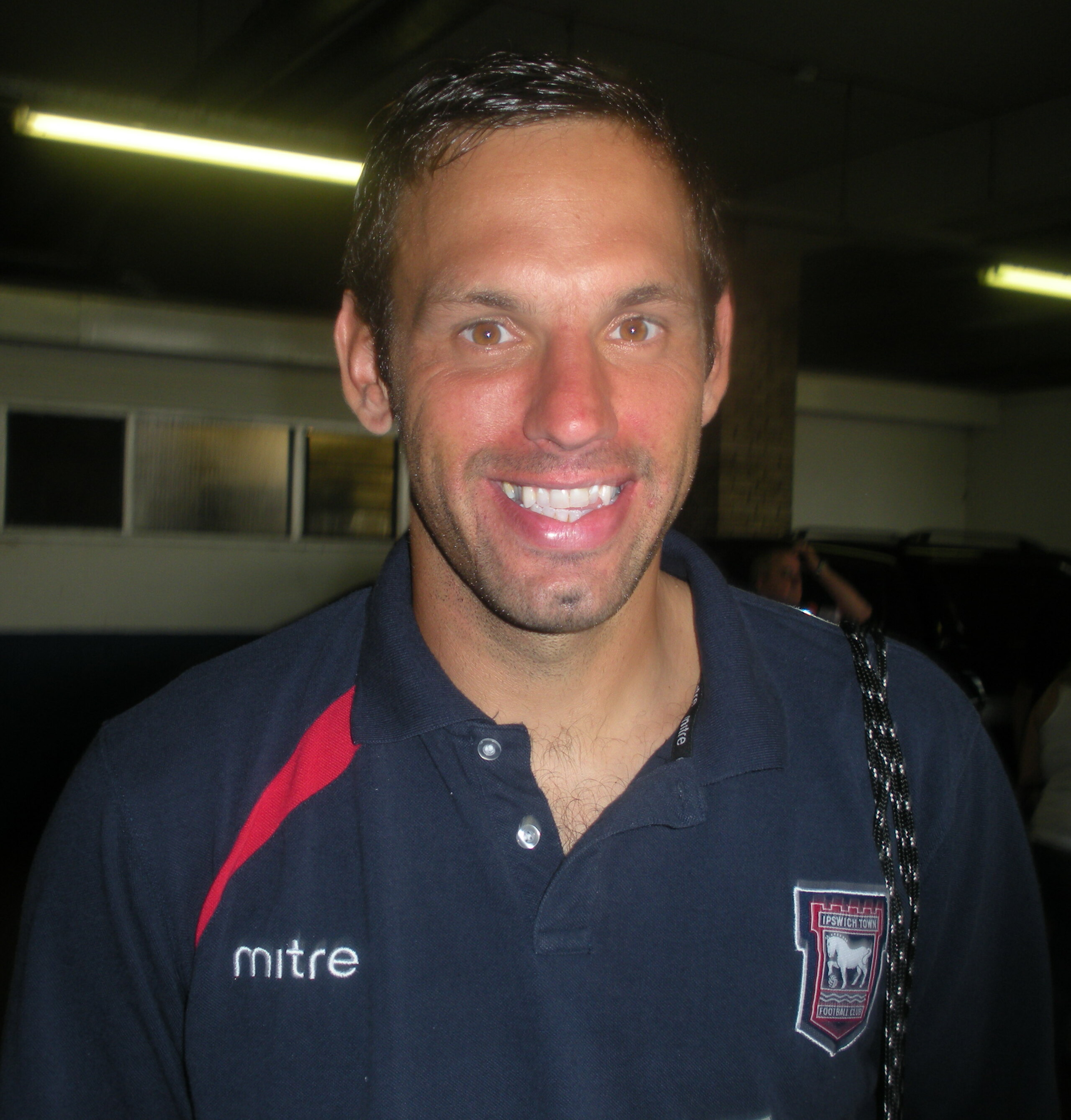
- Wright with Ipswich Town in 2009

Personal information
- Full name: Richard Ian Wright
- Date of birth: 5 November 1977 (age 48)
- Place of birth: Ipswich, England
- Height: 6 ft 2 in (1.88 m)
- Position: Goalkeeper

Team information
- Current team: Manchester City (goalkeeping coach)

Youth career
- –1995: Ipswich Town

Senior career*
| Years | Team | Apps | (Gls) |
| 1995–2001 | Ipswich Town | 240 | (0) |
| 2001–2002 | Arsenal | 12 | (0) |
| 2002–2007 | Everton | 60 | (0) |
| 2007–2008 | West Ham United | 0 | (0) |
| 2008 | → Southampton (loan) | 7 | (0) |
| 2008–2010 | Ipswich Town | 58 | (0) |
| 2010–2011 | Sheffield United | 2 | (0) |
| 2011–2012 | Ipswich Town | 1 | (0) |
| 2012 | Preston North End | 0 | (0) |
| 2012–2016 | Manchester City | 0 | (0) |
| Total | | 380 | (0) |

International career
| 1996 | England U18 | 1 | (0) |
| 1997–2000 | England U21 | 15 | (0) |
| 2000–2001 | England | 2 | (0) |
- * Club domestic league appearances and goals

Richard Ian Wright (born 5 November 1977) is an English football coach and former professional player who is a goalkeeping coach for Premier League club Manchester City.

As a player he was a goalkeeper. He joined Ipswich Town as a trainee, going on to play for the club 298 times between 1995 and 2001. He then moved to Premier League club Arsenal, before being signed by Everton in 2002, where he spent five years. A brief spell on loan from West Ham United with Southampton was followed by a transfer back to Ipswich Town. After a short spell at Sheffield United, a third stint at Ipswich and a brief time at Preston North End, he joined Premier League champions Manchester City on a free transfer in 2012. After four years at City, during which he did not make an appearance, he announced his retirement in May 2016. He remained with City as a coach under new manager Pep Guardiola.

He made two appearances for the England team and was included in Kevin Keegan's 23-man squad for UEFA Euro 2000 but did not make an appearance in the tournament.

== Club career ==
=== Ipswich Town ===
Wright was born in Ipswich, Suffolk, and signed a professional contract with Ipswich Town on 2 January 1995 after serving his apprenticeship and made his debut as a 17-year-old in a 2–0 victory at home to Coventry City in May that year. The season ended with Ipswich's relegation from the Premier League, and for the following four, Ipswich lost in the promotion play-offs from the Football League First Division.

He played a major role in Ipswich's 1999–2000 season when the club were promoted via the play-offs at the fifth attempt. On 29 May 2000, in the play-off final against Barnsley, Ipswich won 4–2, with Wright's long goal kick being flicked on by Marcus Stewart for Richard Naylor to put them 2–1 up. Wright scored an unfortunate own goal when a shot rebounded off the bar and hit him, and then gave away a penalty kick by fouling Craig Hignett, but saved it from Darren Barnard. In Ipswich's first season back in the top flight, he inspired them to 5th place and qualification to the UEFA Cup.

=== Arsenal ===
Wright joined Arsenal on 5 July 2001 for £2 million. He signed a five-year contract. Manager Arsène Wenger envisaged him as a long-term successor to David Seaman and also as a more experienced competitor for the previous second-choice goalkeeper Alex Manninger, who soon left the club.

Wright made his debut against Derby County on 29 September, keeping a clean sheet in a 2–0 win at Pride Park which sent Arsenal top of the table. On his UEFA Champions League debut against Panathinaikos he saved an Angelos Basinas penalty to help his side win 2–1. Despite an injury to Seaman which gave him an extended run in the team, he did not capitalise on the opportunity, punching the ball into his own net in a 4–2 home defeat to Charlton Athletic on 4 November when trying to clear from Paul Konchesky, and then two weeks later he was at fault for Gus Poyet's injury time equaliser in the North London Derby against Tottenham Hotspur. Four days later, he was substituted at half time with injury in a UEFA Champions League match away to Deportivo de La Coruña, being replaced by youth goalkeeper Stuart Taylor in the 2–0 defeat. He slipped to third choice behind Taylor and played mostly FA Cup matches for the remainder of the season, up to and including the semi-final against Middlesbrough, although Seaman replaced him for the final, which Arsenal won 2–0 against Chelsea. He made his last Arsenal appearance on the final day of the 2001–02 season, a 4–3 victory over Everton. Arsene Wenger deliberately started him for the match, so that he ended the season with 10 league appearances, qualifying him for a winners' medal; he was substituted for Stuart Taylor late in the game, so that Taylor would also make 10 appearances and earn a medal. Wright made 22 appearances for Arsenal in total.

=== Everton ===
After Seaman was given a one-year contract extension, Wright sought first-team action elsewhere, and on 24 July 2002 he moved to Everton for an initial £3.5 million, potentially rising by another million if a set number of appearances were reached.

On his Goodison Park debut on 17 August, he made an error and gifted a goal to Les Ferdinand in a 2–2 draw with Tottenham Hotspur, but a week later he saved a penalty from Kevin Phillips in a 1–0 win at Sunderland. After the season had ended, on 13 June 2003, he had a freak accident when he fell from his loft and injured his shoulder.

In August 2003, Everton brought in veteran Nigel Martyn. On 13 September, Wright went off injured 26 minutes into an eventual 2–2 draw against Newcastle United. He faced knee surgery and missed the remainder of the season.

During the 2005–06 season, Martyn had a spell out with injury, but Wright injured himself soon after while warming up for a match against Chelsea on 8 February 2006; a large sign instructed players to use temporary goals for their warm-up but he ignored the warning and fell on the sign, injuring his ankle. Despite Martyn's retirement, Wright remained second in the pecking order for the 2006–07 season behind new arrival Tim Howard. He played 71 games in total for Everton, but only two in his last campaign.

=== West Ham United ===
Wright was released by Everton at the end of the 2006–07 season, and signed for West Ham United on 4 July 2007. Second-choice to Robert Green, he made his Hammers debut on 28 August in a 2–1 win at Bristol Rovers in the second round of the League Cup.

On 20 March 2008, having only played two further League Cup games for West Ham he joined Southampton of the Championship on a month's loan as their first three goalkeepers were all unavailable through injury. Two days later, he made his debut in a goalless home draw with Coventry City. On 18 April, the loan was extended to the end of the 2007–08 season, he totalled seven appearances for the Saints.

=== Return to Ipswich Town ===
Wright rejoined Ipswich on 21 July 2008 for an undisclosed fee on a two-year contract with the option of a third year. He then made his 300th club appearance for Ipswich in a 4–1 loss against Wigan Athletic on 23 September in the third round of the League Cup. His fine performances for his hometown club earned him the Players and supporters' player of the season awards for the 2008–2009 season. On 1 December 2009 Wright was ruled out for up to four months following a knee injury suffered during a 2–1 win against Cardiff City. Wright was released by Ipswich at the end of the 2009–10 season.

=== Sheffield United ===
After a brief trial spell, Wright joined Sheffield United on a free transfer on a four-month short-term deal in September 2010, having been extended until the end of the season. Despite this Wright spent most of his time at Bramall Lane injured and made only two starts, both times being withdrawn midway through the game due to further injuries. His contract was terminated with Sheffield United by mutual consent at the start of April 2011.

=== Third spell at Ipswich Town ===
Wright returned to Ipswich in the summer of 2011 to train with the club. Having been on trial at other clubs he had impressed enough while training with Ipswich to earn a call up to the reserves, in which he featured in a game against Colchester United.

Wright re-signed for the club for his third spell on 23 November 2011. Earlier in the week he had stated he wanted to return to the club: "I love Ipswich Town Football Club, I don't hide that. I think everyone knows that, but at the moment there's nothing there for me – simple as that, you just get on with it and look elsewhere. If anything changed and something came up (at Ipswich) then I'd be a liar to say I wouldn't consider it because I would." In his third debut for the club, Wright conceded three times in a 3–2 home defeat to Reading.

=== Preston North End ===
On 1 July 2012, Wright signed for Preston North End; however, he left the club only one week into pre-season training as he was suffering from homesickness, having made no appearances for the club.

=== Manchester City ===
Following a trial with Colchester United, Wright signed for Manchester City on 30 August 2012, completing a free transfer and agreeing a one-year contract. On 10 July 2013, Wright signed a one-year extension with City. Despite not making a competitive appearance for the club in either season, he was awarded a new contract for the 2014–15 season, at the expense of second-choice Costel Pantilimon. The contract was extended by one year for the fourth consecutive season, during summer 2015. Wright remained at Manchester City for four years in total, but never made a first-team appearance, before announcing his retirement on 17 May 2016. He remained as a coach under new manager Pep Guardiola.

== International career ==
Wright was capped twice for England, making his debut against Malta in a friendly on 3 June 2000; he gave away two penalty kicks, conceding the first as David Carabott's shot rebounded into the net off his head after hitting the post, and saving the second, again from Carabott, in the 88th minute as England won 2–1. He was a member of the England UEFA Euro 2000 squad, where he was third choice behind David Seaman and Nigel Martyn.

On 15 August 2001, he earned his second and final cap, replacing the injured David James, who himself had replaced Martyn at half-time in a 2–0 friendly defeat against the Netherlands at White Hart Lane. Wright kept a clean sheet, as England were already 2–0 down when he came on.

== Coaching career ==
Following his retirement at the end of the 2015–16 season, Wright remained with Manchester City and became a goalkeeping coach on Pep Guardiola's coaching staff.

== Personal life ==
In November 1998, Wright and his girlfriend Kelly Hammond had a son, Harry. In May 2000, two days after Ipswich had beaten Bolton Wanderers in the play-off semi-final to reach Wembley, he and Kelly married. Wright's father-in-law, Geoff Hammond, a former full-back, scored two goals in 69 Ipswich appearances between 1970 and 1973. Harry, who also plays as a goalkeeper, signed a professional deal for Ipswich on his 17th birthday.

== Career statistics ==
=== Club ===
Appearances and goals by club, season and competition
| Club | Season | League | | | FA Cup | | League Cup | | Europe | | Other | | Total | |
| Club | Season | Division | Apps | Goals | Apps | Goals | Apps | Goals | Apps | Goals | Apps | Goals | Apps | Goals |
|---|---|---|---|---|---|---|---|---|---|---|---|---|---|---|
| Ipswich Town | 1994–95 | Premier League | 3 | 0 | 0 | 0 | 1 | 0 | — | | — | | 4 | 0 |
| Ipswich Town | 1995–96 | First Division | 23 | 0 | 3 | 0 | 1 | 0 | — | | 0 | 0 | 27 | 0 |
| Ipswich Town | 1996–97 | First Division | 40 | 0 | 1 | 0 | 5 | 0 | — | | 2 (Note: Appearances in First Division play-offs) | 0 | 48 | 0 |
| Ipswich Town | 1997–98 | First Division | 46 | 0 | 4 | 0 | 6 | 0 | — | | 2 | 0 | 58 | 0 |
| Ipswich Town | 1998–99 | First Division | 46 | 0 | 2 | 0 | 4 | 0 | — | | 2 | 0 | 54 | 0 |
| Ipswich Town | 1999–2000 | First Division | 46 | 0 | 1 | 0 | 4 | 0 | — | | 3 | 0 | 54 | 0 |
| Ipswich Town | 2000–01 | Premier League | 36 | 0 | 2 | 0 | 6 | 0 | — | | — | | 44 | 0 |
| Ipswich Town | Total | | 240 | 0 | 13 | 0 | 27 | 0 | — | | 9 | 0 | 289 | 0 |
| Arsenal | 2001–02 | Premier League | 12 | 0 | 5 | 0 | 1 | 0 | 4 (Note: Appearances in UEFA Champions League) | 0 | — | | 22 | 0 |
| Everton | 2002–03 | Premier League | 33 | 0 | 1 | 0 | 3 | 0 | — | | — | | 37 | 0 |
| Everton | 2003–04 | Premier League | 4 | 0 | 0 | 0 | 0 | 0 | — | | — | | 4 | 0 |
| Everton | 2004–05 | Premier League | 7 | 0 | 2 | 0 | 3 | 0 | — | | — | | 12 | 0 |
| Everton | 2005–06 | Premier League | 15 | 0 | 1 | 0 | 0 | 0 | 0 | 0 | — | | 16 | 0 |
| Everton | 2006–07 | Premier League | 1 | 0 | 0 | 0 | 1 | 0 | — | | — | | 2 | 0 |
| Everton | Total | | 60 | 0 | 4 | 0 | 7 | 0 | 0 | 0 | — | | 71 | 0 |
| West Ham United | 2007–08 | Premier League | 0 | 0 | 0 | 0 | 3 | 0 | — | | — | | 3 | 0 |
| Southampton (loan) | 2007–08 | Championship | 7 | 0 | — | | — | | — | | — | | 7 | 0 |
| Ipswich Town | 2008–09 | Championship | 46 | 0 | 2 | 0 | 2 | 0 | — | | — | | 50 | 0 |
| Ipswich Town | 2009–10 | Championship | 12 | 0 | 0 | 0 | 1 | 0 | — | | — | | 13 | 0 |
| Ipswich Town | Total | | 58 | 0 | 2 | 0 | 3 | 0 | — | | — | | 63 | 0 |
| Sheffield United | 2010–11 | Championship | 2 | 0 | 0 | 0 | — | | — | | — | | 2 | 0 |
| Ipswich Town | 2011–12 | Championship | 1 | 0 | 0 | 0 | — | | — | | — | | 1 | 0 |
| Manchester City | 2012–13 | Premier League | 0 | 0 | 0 | 0 | 0 | 0 | 0 | 0 | — | | 0 | 0 |
| Manchester City | 2013–14 | Premier League | 0 | 0 | 0 | 0 | 0 | 0 | 0 | 0 | — | | 0 | 0 |
| Manchester City | 2014–15 | Premier League | 0 | 0 | 0 | 0 | 0 | 0 | 0 | 0 | 0 | 0 | 0 | 0 |
| Manchester City | 2015–16 | Premier League | 0 | 0 | 0 | 0 | 0 | 0 | 0 | 0 | — | | 0 | 0 |
| Manchester City | Total | | 0 | 0 | 0 | 0 | 0 | 0 | 0 | 0 | 0 | 0 | 0 | 0 |
| Career total | | | 380 | 0 | 24 | 0 | 41 | 0 | 4 | 0 | 9 | 0 | 458 | 0 |

=== International ===
Appearances and goals by national team and year
| National team | Year | Apps | Goals |
|---|---|---|---|
| England | 2000 | 1 | 0 |
| England | 2001 | 1 | 0 |
| Total | | 2 | 0 |

== Honours ==
Ipswich Town

- Football League First Division play-offs: 2000

Arsenal

- Premier League: 2001–02
- FA Cup: 2001–02

Individual

- PFA Team of the Year: 1998–99 First Division, 1999–2000 First Division
- Ipswich Town Player of the Year: 2008–09
- Ipswich Town Players' Player of the Year: 2008–09
