= Andrew Gregory (footballer) =

English footballer

Personal information
- Date of birth: 8 October 1976 (age 50)
- Place of birth: Barnsley, England
- Position: Midfielder

Senior career*
| Years | Team | Apps | (Gls) |
| 1995–2000 | Barnsley | 26 | (5) |
| 1999–2000 | → Carlisle United (loan) | 14 | (6) |
- * Club domestic league appearances and goals

Andrew Gregory (born 8 October 1976) is an English former professional footballer who played in The Football League for Barnsley and Carlisle United.
