= Ashley Ward =

English footballer

Personal information
- Full name: Ashley Stuart Ward
- Date of birth: 24 November 1970 (age 55)
- Place of birth: Middleton, Lancashire, England
- Position: Forward

Youth career
- Cheadle Town

Senior career*
Years	Team	Apps	(Gls)
1989–1991	Manchester City	1	(0)
1991	→ Wrexham (loan)	4	(2)
1991–1992	Leicester City	10	(0)
1992	→ Blackpool (loan)	2	(1)
1992–1994	Crewe Alexandra	61	(25)
1994–1996	Norwich City	53	(18)
1996–1997	Derby County	40	(9)
1997–1998	Barnsley	46	(20)
1998–2000	Blackburn Rovers	54	(13)
2000–2003	Bradford City	84	(17)
2003–2005	Sheffield United	33	(5)
Total		388	(110)
- * Club domestic league appearances and goals

Ashley Ward (born 24 November 1970) is an English former professional footballer who played as a centre forward.

Having come through the Manchester City academy, he notably played in the Premier League for Norwich City, Derby County, Barnsley, Blackburn Rovers and Bradford City, as well as in the Football League with Wrexham, Leicester City, Crewe Alexandra and Sheffield United.

== Early life ==
Ward was born in Middleton, Lancashire, the son of a coal mining engineer. He attended William Hulme's Grammar School, which opted for rugby and lacrosse as the school sports over football.

== Football career ==
Ward had a spell with Manchester United in the 1986–87 season, making 16 appearances for the club's Junior B team. He then played for Cheadle Town Youth, and chose to become an apprentice at Manchester City above an offer from Blackburn Rovers.

He then played for Leicester City before a move to Crewe Alexandra, where he made his name. At the start of the 1992–93 season, Craig Hignett and Tony Naylor were a prolific strike partnership but after Hignett was signed by Middlesbrough, Ward began to feature. He made his Crewe debut in an EFL Trophy match against Wrexham at Gresty Road on 8 December 1992, and scored his first Crewe goal in a 1–1 draw against Rochdale on 12 March 1993, then adding five more before the season finished. In the following injury-affected season, he scored 13 goals in 24 appearances, including the final-day winner at Chester City that earned Crewe promotion from the third tier. He started the 1994–1995 season with three goals in Crewe's first five fixtures, added four more in four appearances in October, then scored in six consecutive games for Crewe, including two hat-tricks (against Gresley Rovers in the FA Cup, and Chester City in the EFL Trophy).

Ward was then signed by Norwich City for £350,000 in December 1994. On his Canaries debut, he scored two first-half goals against Chelsea, then made it three goals in two games, scoring at Crystal Palace. He scored eight times in 25 appearances in total before the season finished; he then added another 10 league and three League Cup goals before a move to Derby County in March 1996.

Ward contributed to Derby's 1996-97 Premier League campaign, scoring a late winner against Chelsea. One of his other goals came as Derby beat Manchester United 3–2 at Old Trafford. Barnsley signed Ward from Derby County in September 1997, shortly after their promotion to the Premier League. Throughout their debut season in the Premier League he scored some important goals, including the only goals in 1–0 victories against Liverpool and Aston Villa at Anfield and Villa Park, respectively.

In November 1998, whilst still playing for Barnsley in a match at Sunderland, Ward scored, missed a penalty and got sent off in the space of five minutes, with all incidents also involving Sunderland defender Darren Williams.

After spells at Blackburn Rovers, Bradford City and Sheffield United, Ward retired in the summer of 2005.

== Personal life ==
Ward and his wife Dawn, who is known for appearing on The Real Housewives of Cheshire, run a number of businesses together, including, a commercial property business, operating Abafields, a nursing home in Bolton bought for development but now operating under a manager. He also manages a £15million luxury property development company Bilton Ward Developments. Formed in 2002 the company specialises in the building and renovation of luxury homes, however this has now gone into liquidation, mainly for footballers including Kevin Campbell and Wayne Rooney. Interior design is often done by former Changing Rooms designer Laura McCree.

In March 2011, Ward was linked with a possible move to buy Wrexham.

== Honours ==
Individual

- Barnsley Player of the Year: 1997–98
