= Jovo Bosančić =

Serbian footballer

Personal information
- Full name: Jovan Bosančić
- Date of birth: 7 August 1970 (age 56)
- Place of birth: Novi Sad, Yugoslavia
- Height: 1.80 m (5 ft 11 in)
- Position: Midfielder

Youth career
- 1980–1988: Vojvodina

Senior career*
Years	Team	Apps	(Gls)
1988–1992	Vojvodina	39	(1)
1992–1995	União Madeira	72	(10)
1996	Campomaiorense	4	(0)
1996–1998	Barnsley	42	(3)
1998–1999	Guingamp	4	(0)
1999–2000	União Madeira	20	(1)
2000–2003	Nacional	24	(0)
- * Club domestic league appearances and goals

Jovan "Jovo" Bosančić (Serbian Cyrillic: Јoвo Бocaнчић; born 7 August 1970) is a Serbian former footballer who played as a right midfielder.

== Club career ==
Born in Novi Sad, SR Serbia, Bosančić started playing football at the age of 10 when he joined the youth team of FK Vojvodina. He made his debut as a senior in the 1988–89 season and played in the Yugoslav First League until 1992.

Bosančić then moved to Portugal where he spent most of his career, playing for C.F. União (two seasons), S.C. Campomaiorense, Barnsley and En Avant Guingamp, and finishing his career with União's Madeira neighbours C.D. Nacional.

He helped the Tykes gain promotion to the Premier League for the first time in the club's history, only to be immediately relegated. Whilst in the Premier League he scored twice, in games against Blackburn Rovers and Southampton. He retired from football in 2003, at the age of 33.
