= Eric Tinkler =

South African soccer player, coach, and manager

Personal information
- Date of birth: 30 July 1970 (age 56)
- Place of birth: Roodepoort, South Africa
- Height: 1.86 m (6 ft 1 in)
- Position: Midfielder

Team information
- Current team: Durban City (head coach)

Senior career*
Years	Team	Apps	(Gls)
1990–1991	Wits University	18	(0)
1991–1992	União de Tomar	34	(5)
1992–1996	Vitória	84	(2)
1996–1997	Cagliari	20	(0)
1997–2002	Barnsley	99	(9)
2002–2005	Caldas	54	(15)
2005–2007	Bidvest Wits	29	(3)
Total		337	(34)

International career
1994–2002	South Africa	45	(1)

Managerial career
- 2013–2016: Orlando Pirates
- 2016–2017: Cape Town City
- 2017–2018: SuperSport United
- 2018: Chippa United
- 2019–2020: Maritzburg United
- 2021–2024: Cape Town City
- 2025–2026: Sekhukhune United
- 2026: Asante Kotoko
- 2026–: Durban City
- * Club domestic league appearances and goals

Eric Tinkler (born 30 July 1970) is a South African football coach and former player who is the head coach of South African Premiership club Durban City.

== Early and personal life ==
Tinkler was born in Roodepoort.

== Club career ==
Tinkler played club football for Wits University, União de Tomar, Vitória, Cagliari, Barnsley, Caldas and Bidvest Wits.

Tinkler moved from Italian club Cagliari to English club Barnsley on 1 July 1997 for a transfer fee of £650,000.

== International career ==
Tinkler earned 45 caps for the South African national team between 1994 and 2002, scoring 1 goal. He was part of the South Africa squad that won the 1996 African Cup of Nations, playing in the final.

== Coaching career ==
Tinkler became head coach of Orlando Pirates in December 2013; in May 2015, it was announced that he would continue in that role for the 2015–16 season. Tinkler left Orlando Pirates to become the first head coach of Cape Town City club on 17 June 2016. On 8 June 2017, he became head coach of SuperSport United. He quit in March 2018.

After a spell with Chippa United, he became manager of Maritzburg United in January 2019. He left the club in November 2020.

He returned as manager of Cape Town City on 24 May 2021. On 31 December 2024, Tinkler left the club.

He joined Sekhukhune United in March 2025. He was voted the August 2025 South African Premiership coach of the month. He left the club in April 2026 by mutual consent.

On 17 July 2026, Tinkler was appointed as head coach of Ghana Premier League side Asante Kotoko. On 28 September Tinkler left Asante Kotoko due to personal reasons.One month later he joined Durban City replacing Khalil Ben Youssef

== Career statistics ==
=== Club ===
Appearances and goals by club, season and competition
Club	Season	League			FA Cup		League Cup		Other		Total	
Club	Season	Division	Apps	Goals	Apps	Goals	Apps	Goals	Apps	Goals	Apps	Goals
Barnsley	1997–98	Premier League	25	2	2	0	2	0	-		29	2
Barnsley	1998–99	First Division	25	3	3	0	2	0	-		30	3
Barnsley	1999–2000	First Division	33	4	1	0	5	0	3	0	42	4
Barnsley	2000–01	First Division	0	0	0	0	0	0	-		0	0
Barnsley	2001–02	First Division	16	0	0	0	1	1	-		17	1
Barnsley	Total		99	9	6	0	10	1	3	0	118	10
Career total			99	9	6	0	10	1	3	0	118	10

=== International ===
South Africa national team
Year	Apps	Goals
1994	5	0
1995	4	0
1996	11	1
1997	10	0
1998	0	0
1999	2	0
2000	6	0
2001	2	0
2002	5	0
Total	45	1

== Honours ==
Cape Town City

- Telkom Knockout Final

Supersport United

- MTN 8 Cup Final

Individual

- South African Premiership Coach of the Month: August 2025
