= Lars Leese =

German footballer and manager

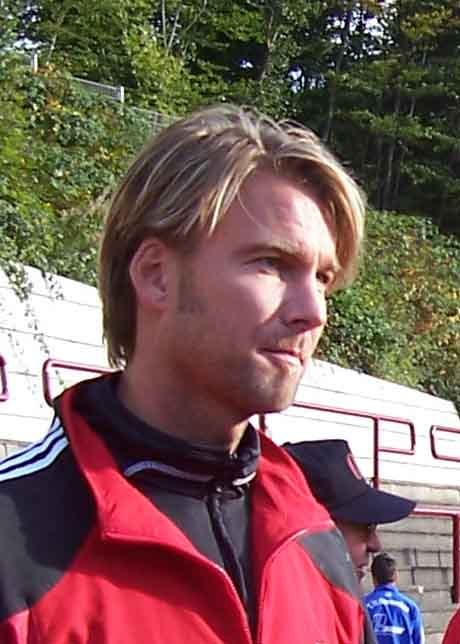

Personal information
- Date of birth: 18 August 1969 (age 57)
- Place of birth: Cologne, West Germany
- Height: 6 ft 5 in (1.96 m)
- Position: Goalkeeper

Team information
- Current team: DSK Köln (Manager)

Senior career*
Years	Team	Apps	(Gls)
1992–1995	VfB Wissen	25	(0)
1995–1996	SCB Preußen Köln		
1996–1997	Bayer Leverkusen	0	(0)
1997–1999	Barnsley	16	(0)
2000–2001	SCB Preußen Köln		
2001–2003	Borussia Mönchengladbach II		
2003–2005	1. FC Köln II	29	(0)

Managerial career
- 2005–2011: SV Bergisch Gladbach 09
- 2011–2013: SSVg Velbert
- 2013–2014: SSVg Velbert
- 2015–: DSK Köln
- * Club domestic league appearances and goals

Lars Leese (born 18 August 1969) is a German former professional footballer who played as a goalkeeper. He is currently the manager of DSK Köln.

== Playing career ==
Born in Cologne, West Germany, his youths club were Fortuna Köln, 1. FC Köln and BC Efferen. From 1989 until 1995, he played for low-tier sides Spfr Neitersen (1989–1992) and VfB Wissen (1992–1995) before joining fourth-tier SCB Preußen Köln. In 1996, he transferred across the Rhine river to play for Bundesliga side Bayer Leverkusen. However, being third goalkeeper, he did not get to play a single match. In June 1997, he therefore transferred to newly promoted English Premier League side Barnsley for £250,000. Leese played in England for just two seasons, appearing in 16 league games and four League Cup matches.

After his two-year contract at Barnsley was not extended, he returned to his native Cologne and played the 2000–01 season for Preußen Köln and from 2001 to 2003 at the reserves of Bundesliga side Borussia Mönchengladbach. Two more seasons at 1. FC Köln followed, where he was captain of the Reserve team and also called up as a substitute for some Bundesliga matches in the 2004–05 season. In the summer of 2005, he ended his active career.

== Coaching career ==
From 2005 to 2011, he was the coach of fifth-tier SV Bergisch Gladbach 09. In 2011, he took over at SSVg Velbert.

On 5 May 2015, it was confirmed that DSK Köln new manager was Leese.
