= Aleš Križan =

Slovenian footballer

Personal information
- Date of birth: 25 July 1971 (age 55)
- Place of birth: Maribor, SFR Yugoslavia
- Height: 1.82 m (6 ft 0 in)
- Position: Left-back

Youth career
- Kovinar Maribor

Senior career*
Years	Team	Apps	(Gls)
1988–1989	Rudar Velenje		
1989–1997	Maribor	257	(2)
1997–2000	Barnsley	13	(0)
2000–2002	Maribor	45	(3)
2002–2003	Korotan Prevalje	19	(0)
2003–2007	SV Wildon		
2007–2009	USV Mettersdorf	52	(2)

International career
1992–1998	Slovenia	25	(0)
- * Club domestic league appearances and goals

Aleš Križan (born 25 July 1971) is a Slovenian retired footballer who played as a defender.

== Club career ==
Križan most notably played in England for Barnsley having joined from Maribor. He played in the 1997–98 Premier League with the South Yorkshire club, appearing in 12 matches as a starter. However, they were relegated after that season and he only played one more league game in the next two seasons for Barnsley after John Hendrie became the manager and also after breaking a leg at the beginning of season. He left the team in 2000, shortly after his teammates lost the playoff final to Ipswich Town.

After retiring from professional football, he played amateur football in Austria for SV Wildon and USV Mettersdorf.

== International career ==
Križan was capped 25 times for the Slovenia national team between 1992 and 1998.
