= Georgi Hristov (footballer, born 1976) =

Macedonian footballer

Personal information
- Full name: Georgi Hristov
- Date of birth: 30 January 1976 (age 50)
- Place of birth: Bitola, SR Macedonia, SFR Yugoslavia
- Height: 1.82 m (6 ft 0 in)
- Position: Striker

Youth career
- Pelister

Senior career*
Years	Team	Apps	(Gls)
1992–1994	Pelister		
1994–1997	Partizan	61	(20)
1997–2000	Barnsley	43	(8)
2000–2003	NEC	55	(18)
2003–2004	Zwolle	13	(4)
2005	Dunfermline Athletic	8	(0)
2005	Debrecen	2	(0)
2006	Hapoel Nazareth Illit	7	(3)
2006	Niki Volos	0	(0)
2007	Olympiakos Nicosia	7	(0)
2007–2008	Den Bosch	27	(8)
2008	Baku	6	(0)
2009	JJK	9	(1)
Total		238	(62)

International career
1994–1995	Macedonia U21	4	(2)
1995–2005	Macedonia	48	(16)

Managerial career
- 2011–2012: Metalurg Skopje
- * Club domestic league appearances and goals

Georgi Hristov (Macedonian: Ѓорѓи Христов; born 30 January 1976) is a Macedonian former professional footballer who played as a striker.

Hristov represented Macedonia internationally between 1995 and 2005, amassing 48 caps and scoring 16 goals.

== Club career ==
Born in Bitola, Hristov started out at his hometown club Pelister, making his Yugoslav First League debut at the age of 16. He would earn himself a transfer to Partizan in 1994, spending three years with the Crno-beli and winning back-to-back championships in 1996 and 1997. In June 1997, Hristov was sold to English side Barnsley for a club record fee of £1.5 million. He scored four league goals in his debut season with the Tykes as they suffered relegation from the Premiership. Over the next two seasons, Hristov missed a majority of games due to a knee injury, before eventually leaving on a free transfer. He subsequently joined Dutch club NEC in July 2000, finishing his debut season in Eredivisie as the team's top scorer with 15 goals.

In July 2003, following two injury-plagued seasons with NEC, Hristov completed a switch to Zwolle on a one-year deal with an option for a further year. He was forced to undergo another knee surgery in January 2004, causing him to miss the rest of the season. After half a year without a club, Hristov joined Scottish side Dunfermline Athletic in January 2005. He was, however, released by the Pars before the end of the season.

In September 2005, Hristov moved to Hungary and signed with Debrecen on a four-year deal. His contract was prematurely terminated by mutual agreement before the end of the same year. Between January and May 2006, Hristov played for Israeli Premier League club Hapoel Nazareth Illit in a failed attempt to save them from relegation.

== International career ==
At international level, Hristov was capped on 48 occasions for Macedonia, scoring 16 times. He netted a goal on his debut in a 2–2 draw against Armenia on 10 May 1995. His last cap came on 12 October 2005 in a 0–0 draw away against the Netherlands.

== Managerial career ==
In October 2011, Hristov was appointed as manager of Metalurg Skopje. He resigned from his position in November 2012.

== Career statistics ==
=== Club ===
Appearances and goals by club, season and competition
Club	Season	League			National cup		League cup		Continental		Other		Total	
Club	Season	Division	Apps	Goals	Apps	Goals	Apps	Goals	Apps	Goals	Apps	Goals	Apps	Goals
Pelister	1991–92	Yugoslav First League			—		—		—		—			
Pelister	1992–93	Macedonian First League					—		—		—			
Pelister	1993–94	Macedonian First League					—		—		—			
Pelister	Total						—		—		—			
Partizan	1994–95	First League of FR Yugoslavia	12	3	3	3	—		—		—		15	6
Partizan	1995–96	First League of FR Yugoslavia	25	8	8	1	—		—		—		33	9
Partizan	1996–97	First League of FR Yugoslavia	24	9	1	1	—		4	1	—		29	11
Partizan	Total		61	20	12	5	—		4	1	—		77	26
Barnsley	1997–98	Premier League	21	4	2	0	3	1	—		—		26	5
Barnsley	1998–99	First Division	3	0	0	0	0	0	—		—		3	0
Barnsley	1999–2000	First Division	19	4	0	0	5	2	—		1 (Note: Appearances in First Division play-offs)	0	25	6
Barnsley	Total		43	8	2	0	8	3	—		1	0	54	11
NEC	2000–01	Eredivisie	25	15	4	2	—		—		—		29	17
NEC	2001–02	Eredivisie	8	1	2	3	—		—		—		10	4
NEC	2002–03	Eredivisie	22	2	4	3	—		—		—		26	5
NEC	Total		55	18	10	8	—		—		—		65	26
Zwolle	2003–04	Eredivisie	13	4	2	3	—		—		—		15	7
Dunfermline Athletic	2004–05	Scottish Premier League	8	0	1	0	0	0	0	0	—		9	0
Debrecen	2005–06	Nemzeti Bajnokság I	2	0	2	1	—		0	0	0	0	4	1
Hapoel Nazareth Illit	2005–06	Israeli Premier League	7	3					—		—		7	3
Niki Volos	2006–07	Beta Ethniki	0	0			—		—		—		0	0
Olympiakos Nicosia	2006–07	Cypriot First Division	7	0	0	0	—		—		—		7	0
Den Bosch	2007–08	Eerste Divisie	27	8	3	1	—		—		3 (Note: Appearances in Eerste Divisie play-offs)	0	33	9
Baku	2008–09	Azerbaijan Premier League	6	0			—		—		—		6	0
JJK	2009	Veikkausliiga	9	1			0	0	—				9	1
Career total			238	62	32	18	8	3	4	1	4	0	286	84

=== International ===
Appearances and goals by national team and year
National team	Year	Apps	Goals
Macedonia	1995	5	1
Macedonia	1996	6	1
Macedonia	1997	6	2
Macedonia	1998	7	4
Macedonia	1999	5	1
Macedonia	2000	8	3
Macedonia	2001	3	1
Macedonia	2002	4	2
Macedonia	2003	3	1
Macedonia	2004	0	0
Macedonia	2005	1	0
Total		48	16

List of international goals scored by Georgi Hristov
No.	Date	Venue	Opponent	Score	Result	Competition
1.	10 May 1995	Hrazdan Stadium, Yerevan, Armenia	Armenia	1–2	2–2	UEFA Euro 1996 qualifying
2.	9 November 1996	Sportpark Eschen-Mauren, Eschen, Liechtenstein	Liechtenstein	3–0	11–1	1998 FIFA World Cup qualification
3.	2 April 1997	Gradski stadion, Skopje, Macedonia	Republic of Ireland	3–1	3–2	1998 FIFA World Cup qualification
4.	7 June 1997	Gradski stadion, Skopje, Macedonia	Iceland	1–0	1–0	1998 FIFA World Cup qualification
5.	25 March 1998	Gradski stadion, Skopje, Macedonia	Bulgaria	1–0	1–0	Friendly
6.	18 April 1998	Gradski stadion, Skopje, Macedonia	South Korea	1–1	2–2	Friendly
7.	20 April 1998	Azadi Stadium, Tehran, Iran	Jamaica	1–0	2–1	1998 LG Cup
8.	20 April 1998	Azadi Stadium, Tehran, Iran	Jamaica	2–0	2–1	1998 LG Cup
9.	5 June 1999	Gradski stadion, Skopje, Macedonia	Croatia	1–1	1–1	UEFA Euro 2000 qualifying
10.	9 June 2000	Azadi Stadium, Tehran, Iran	Iran	1–1	3–1	2000 LG Cup
11.	6 October 2000	Gradski stadion, Skopje, Macedonia	Azerbaijan	1–0	3–0	2002 FIFA World Cup qualification
12.	6 October 2000	Gradski stadion, Skopje, Macedonia	Azerbaijan	2–0	3–0	2002 FIFA World Cup qualification
13.	28 February 2001	Gradski stadion, Skopje, Macedonia	Czech Republic	1–0	1–1	Friendly
14.	21 August 2002	Gradski stadion, Skopje, Macedonia	Malta	3–0	5–0	Friendly
15.	8 September 2002	Rheinpark Stadion, Vaduz, Liechtenstein	Liechtenstein	1–0	1–1	UEFA Euro 2004 qualifying
16.	6 September 2003	Gradski stadion, Skopje, Macedonia	England	1–0	1–2	UEFA Euro 2004 qualifying

== Honours ==
Partizan

- First League of FR Yugoslavia: 1995–96, 1996–97
