= Darren Barnard =

Footballer (born 1971)

Personal information
- Full name: Darren Sean Barnard
- Date of birth: 30 November 1971 (age 54)
- Place of birth: Rinteln, West Germany
- Height: 5 ft 10 in (1.78 m)
- Positions: Wing-back; midfielder

Senior career*
Years	Team	Apps	(Gls)
1989–1990	Wokingham Town	34	(11)
1990–1995	Chelsea	29	(2)
1994	→ Reading (loan)	4	(0)
1995–1997	Bristol City	76	(17)
1997–2002	Barnsley	201	(28)
2002–2004	Grimsby Town	63	(4)
2004–2007	Aldershot Town	102	(19)
2007–2010	Camberley Town	100	(25)
Total		609	(106)

International career
1988	England U18	8	(1)
1998–2004	Wales	24	(0)

Managerial career
- 2010–2011: Camberley Town (Joint with Paul Miles)
- 2011–2012: Camberley Town
- * Club domestic league appearances and goals

Darren Sean Barnard (born 30 November 1971) is a Welsh former professional footballer.

Barnard played as both wing-back and midfielder and played in the Premier League for both Chelsea and Barnsley. He also played in the Football League for Reading, Bristol City, and Grimsby Town before playing in the Conference National for Aldershot Town and finishing his career with non-league Camberley Town. Born in West Germany, he was capped 24 times for the Wales national team and eight times for the England U18.

In 2007, while a player with Camberley Town, he became the club's technical director before becoming first team manager in 2010. He stepped down from his role following the end of the 2011–12 season. He has since worked as the academy manager of Aldershot Town

== Playing career ==
=== Chelsea ===
Chelsea paid non-league Wokingham Town £100,000 to seal the signature of 18-year-old Barnard in July 1990. He had to wait almost 2 years for his first-team debut as he was competing with the established first-team players Gareth Hall and Frank Sinclair for a place in the team. During his time at Chelsea, Barnard played for Bobby Campbell, Ian Porterfield and Glenn Hoddle, but was only given a regular run in the team by caretaker manager David Webb. Barnard was signed at a time when the Blues were attempting to boost their standing in the First Division with the expensive purchases of Dennis Wise and Andy Townsend, Barnard was forced to wait almost two years for his first-team debut. Comfortable playing anywhere along the left-flank, his first appearance was as a replacement for Vinnie Jones in a 2–1 win over West Ham United towards the end of the 1991–92 season, and after two further substitute appearances he was rewarded with his first start, that ended with a 3–1 defeat at Aston Villa.

Manager Ian Porterfield resisted the opportunity to include Barnard in his side at the beginning of the following campaign, preferring to play Gareth Hall out of position in the absence of regular left-back Frank Sinclair, and with the exception of an outing at Coventry City in October it wasn't until the final three months of the campaign – after David Webb was drafted in to replace Porterfield for the remainder of the season – that Barnard began to feature regularly. Given the freedom to roam on the left of Chelsea's midfield, he impressed with a number of cultured displays, the best of which came against Middlesbrough when he scored his first goal for the club, in what was a 4–0 win, and ended with a record that season of eight starts resulting in five wins, two draws and just a single defeat. However, Barnard was restricted to only nine starts in 1993–94, primarily as a left-back.

A mid-table league campaign was compensated for by a run to the final of the FA Cup, and although he did not feature in the final itself, Barnard did play in the semi-final victory over Luton Town after replacing the injured Craig Burley late in the first half. He struck his only goal of the season in a 2–0 defeat of West Ham in March, and his final appearance for the club came six weeks later when he was selected for in the side that was beaten by Coventry City as Hoddle chose to protect his likely cup final team. Despite remaining with the club for a further 18 months, Barnard failed to reappear in the first-team, eventually joining Bristol City in October 1995 for a fee of £175,000, a move which proved to be a launching pad for his career as he went on to become a full international in the colors of Wales.

=== Bristol City ===
Barnard transferred to Bristol City for £175,000. Two seasons in Division Two culminated in losing in the playoff semi-finals to Brentford. Bought from Chelsea, where he had made just a handful of first-team appearances, Barnard initially played on the left-wing for City. However, manager Joe Jordan started to play him at left wing-back shortly after his move to the club, and before long, Barnard was a fully-fledged left wing-back. His ability to run with the ball down the wing, overlap with Brian Tinnion and, of course, his free-kicks had earned him some plaudits. Barnard left the club soon after, to join Barnsley in the Premier League, so this partnership was never seen in a competitive City side. Barnard scored 17 goals in 76 games for City.

=== Barnsley ===
Barnsley was looking to strengthen their squad after promotion to the Premier League for the 1997–98 season, signing Barnard for £750,000 as well as players like Eric Tinkler and Georgi Hristov. Barnard became a Welsh international during this season, making his debut for Wales in a 0–0 draw against Jamaica on 25 March 1998 and went on to collect 18 caps whilst at Barnsley. Unfortunately for Barnsley, the Premier League dream lasted only one season, but Barnard played on for them in the First Division for another four seasons and played in the 1999–00 playoff final defeat to Ipswich Town, in which he missed the opening penalty in the match, the last missed penalty at the old Wembley Stadium, although Barnsley was awarded another which Craig Hignett scored. In the 1998–99 season, Barnard turned down a move to go to Southampton in November, on his first game after he declined the move, he scored what possibly could be one of the all-time great goals for his club and himself, a left-footed volley from the corner of the penalty area after a fine pass by Nicky Eaden. The goal was in Barnsley's 7–1 win over Yorkshire rivals Huddersfield Town on 27 November 1998, a game shown live on Sky Sports. Barnard scored 28 goals in 201 appearances for the club with many assists.

=== Grimsby Town ===
Barnard joined Grimsby Town for the start of the 2002–03 season along with fellow Barnsley player Steve Chettle. Barnard was used as a left-sided midfielder in his first season while under manager Paul Groves but was also used at left-back, the latter was primarily his main position after the departure of Tony Gallimore in the summer of 2003. In both Barnard's seasons at Blundell Park he suffered relegations in which Grimsby went from Division One to Division Three. Following the club's financial difficulties many of Barnard's colleagues had been inexperienced youngsters. Despite not having any luck at his club, Barnard collected another 6 Welsh caps, the last as a substitute against Norway on 27 May 2004, coincidentally alongside former Grimsby teammates Danny Coyne and John Oster.

=== Aldershot Town ===
The former Aldershot and Farnborough District schoolboy joined Aldershot Town in August 2004 after leaving Grimsby Town. The Welsh international left-sided defender was a major signing by the Aldershot manager Terry Brown, becoming the club's penalty taker. In 2007 Barnard was made club captain as well as playing and captaining the Welsh semi Professional side. Barnard scored 24 goals in 127 appearances for Aldershot Town.

== Coaching career ==
Barnard moved to sign for Camberley Town prior to his release from Aldershot in 2007. As well as being used as a player, Barnard was also appointed the Director of Football for the club, and later the general manager. In May 2010 he was appointed joint first team manager alongside ex-Reading and Wycombe Wanderers player Paul Miles. Barnard became sole Manager after Paul Miles resigned in October 2011. In 2010 Barnard started his 'A' Licence coaching badge in Manchester. Other players on the course run through the PFA included David Lee, Paul Williams, Paulo Wanchope and ex-teammate Shaun Goater. In May 2012, Barnard decided to move on from Camberley Town 1st team and stepped down as the Manager.

In July 2011, Barnard become Director and Head Coach for Professional Footballers Soccer Academies. Based at a local 6th Form school and in conjunction with Camberley Town FC. The role included Players receiving daily training involving individual and team coaching focusing on the Roles and Responsibilities of the players within the team. Players received guidance on individual Football fitness, nutritional advice and a regular appraisal to monitor each player's development both on and off the pitch. Players had the opportunity to represent the Football club through the academy, youth, and college or reserve team, with the aim to progress into the first team or progress to higher placed teams.

Barnard was appointed Academy Manager of Aldershot Town in August 2013 just after the club had come out of administration following relegation from the Football League the previous season. Barnard was approached by Aldershot Town Football Club to reinstate the club's Youth Academy after coming out of administration. Barnard very quickly formed a squad of 30 players and although very successful on the pitch it was Barnard's organisational and man-management skills behind the scenes molding the players into a well-drilled unit both on and off the pitch that really stood out. With a vast amount of experience having played himself at the highest level, Barnard understood the welfare and player liaison duties that go with a modern managers position. Once the academy was established and running the decision was taken for Barnard to go and explore alternative routes in his football career. Barnard left Aldershot Town in December 2013.

== Masters Football ==
Masters Football is a branded six-a-side game designed for older (35+) former professional footballers. Barnard also played for Chelsea in 2007 London masters. Chelsea won the trophy with Barnard collecting the Golden Boot award. Barnard also played for the PFA in the Hong Kong 2007 Sevens, losing in the Finals. Barnard collected the Golden Boot award for the second time in 2008 for Chelsea in the London Masters. In 2009 Barnard played for Wales in the Sky Masters, losing out in the final to Ireland. Barnard got his third Golden Boot award in 2010 for Chelsea in the London Masters. Barnard also scored his first hat trick for Chelsea old boys against Reading old boys in 2010.
