= David Watson (footballer, born 1973) =

English footballer (born 1973)

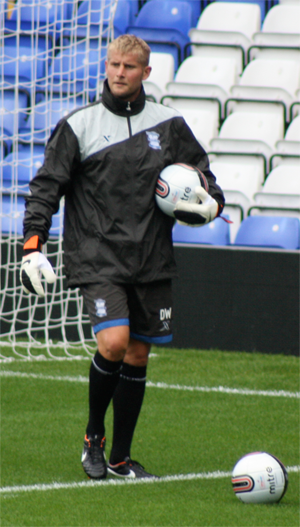
- Watson with Birmingham City in 2011

Personal information
- Full name: David Neil Watson
- Date of birth: 10 November 1973 (age 52)
- Place of birth: Barnsley, England
- Height: 5 ft 11 in (1.80 m)
- Position: Goalkeeper

Youth career
- Barnsley

Senior career*
Years	Team	Apps	(Gls)
1992–2001	Barnsley	178	(0)

International career
1993	England U20	6	(0)
1993–1995	England U21	5	(0)
- * Club domestic league appearances and goals

David Neil Watson (born 10 November 1973) is an English football coach and former player, who played as a goalkeeper for Barnsley and the England under-21 team. After injury forced his early retirement from playing, he took up coaching, working as goalkeeping coach for several clubs as well as spending four years in the same role with the England team. In 2014, he joined Southampton, where he has been a first-team assistant coach since 2019.

== Playing career ==
Watson was born in Barnsley, South Yorkshire. He began his football career in the youth system of his home-town club and went on to make more than 200 appearances for their first team in all competitions, including 178 in league matches. He helped the team finish as runners-up spot in the 1996–97 First Division to gain promotion to the Premier League, and was first-choice goalkeeper in their one season in the top flight. He suffered a knee injury in a game against Norwich City in September 1998; he spent more than two years in an abortive attempt to regain fitness but played no more first-team football and retired in 2001 at the age of 28.

While a Barnsley player, Watson represented England at the 1993 FIFA World Youth Championship. They finished in third place and won the FIFA Fair Play award. He also won five caps for England at under-21 level.

== Coaching career ==
He went on to work as goalkeeping coach with Northampton Town, Oldham Athletic, Huddersfield Town, Northampton Town again, the England under-19 team, and Nottingham Forest, before replacing Nigel Spink as goalkeeping coach of Birmingham City in January 2008.

While in this position, Watson built a reputation as an excellent coach, praised for enhancing the careers of England goalkeepers Joe Hart, Ben Foster and Jack Butland, experience that encouraged new manager Roy Hodgson to invite him to work alongside Ray Clemence with the England team at Euro 2012. Watson remained as England's goalkeeping coach for four years, and was prepared to stay on after Hodgson and the rest of his staff left following the poor performance at Euro 2016, but Hodgson's successor Sam Allardyce replaced him with Martyn Margetson.

On 6 July 2012, Watson joined Norwich City as goalkeeping coach, continuing his relationship with Chris Hughton whom he previously worked under at Birmingham City. Two years later, he joined Southampton as senior goalkeeping coach as part of new manager Ronald Koeman's staff. He was named head of goalkeeping in 2016, and in 2019 was appointed as a first-team assistant coach under Ralph Hasenhüttl.

== Honours ==
Barnsley

- First Division (level 2) runners-up: 1996–97

England Under-20

- FIFA World Youth Championship third place: 1993
