= Scott Jones (English footballer) =

English footballer

Personal information
- Full name: Scott Jones
- Date of birth: 1 May 1975 (age 51)
- Place of birth: Sheffield, South Yorkshire, England
- Height: 5 ft 10 in (1.78 m)
- Positions: Midfielder; defender

Senior career*
Years	Team	Apps	(Gls)
1994–2000	Barnsley	83	(4)
1997	→ Mansfield Town (loan)	6	(0)
1997	→ Notts County (loan)	0	(0)
2000	→ Bristol Rovers (loan)	3	(1)
2000–2002	Bristol Rovers	55	(2)
2002	→ York City	8	(1)
2002–2004	York City	20	(0)
- * Club domestic league appearances and goals

Scott Jones (born 1 May 1975) is an English former professional footballer who played as a midfielder or defender. He is perhaps most remembered for when he scored a brace as Barnsley beat Manchester United in the 1997–98 FA Cup fifth round replay. He later went on to play for Mansfield Town, Notts County, Bristol Rovers and York City, where he scored once against Swansea City.
