= John Hendrie (Scottish footballer) =

Scottish footballer and manager

Personal information
- Full name: John Grattan Hendrie
- Date of birth: 24 October 1963 (age 63)
- Place of birth: Lennoxtown, Stirlingshire, Scotland
- Height: 5 ft 7 in (1.70 m)
- Positions: Striker; right winger

Senior career*
Years	Team	Apps	(Gls)
1981–1984	Coventry City	21	(2)
1983–1984	→ Hereford United (loan)	6	(0)
1984–1988	Bradford City	173	(46)
1988–1989	Newcastle United	34	(4)
1989–1990	Leeds United	27	(5)
1990–1996	Middlesbrough	192	(44)
1996–1999	Barnsley	65	(17)
Total		518	(118)

Managerial career
- 1998–1999: Barnsley
- * Club domestic league appearances and goals

John Grattan Hendrie (born 24 October 1963) is a Scottish former professional footballer who played on the right wing or in attack.

His career started at Coventry City but he moved to Bradford City, where he played 173 consecutive league games, winning one promotion and narrowly missing out on another. Following spells with Newcastle United and Leeds United, he moved to Middlesbrough and scored the final goal at Ayresome Park among his 44 goals for Boro. When he was replaced by Brazilian Juninho he moved to Barnsley where he finished his career and also served as manager.

His uncle is another Scottish former pro footballer, Paul Hendrie. Paul has two sons (John's cousins) in the game; Lee Hendrie made a late substitute appearance for England in 1998 and Stuart Hendrie played for Morecambe.

== Playing career ==
=== Coventry City ===
Hendrie started his professional football career at Coventry City, originally signing as an apprentice in June 1980, and signing full-time forms in May 1981. He was a hit with Coventry's reserves, being top scorer in 1983–84, with ten goals from 25 games, but he struggled to break into the first team and played in just 21 league games during his time at Coventry. Instead he moved on a free transfer to Bradford City in 1984 following a loan spell with Hereford United.

=== Bradford City ===
Hendrie was one of two free transfers between the 1983–84 and 1984–85 seasons, along with Dave Evans, as manager Trevor Cherry tried to build a team capable of promotion from Division Three. Hendrie was an ever-present in his first season scoring nine goals from his right wing position as City won the Division Three title. On the last day of that successful season his day was to turn into a nightmare when 56 spectators were killed in a horrendous stand fire while playing Lincoln City.

Hendrie continued to be one of the first names of the City team-sheet following promotion and during his four seasons at City he missed just one league game. He won a series of fans' awards and nominations for the PFA teams in 1987 and 1988. He scored ten goals in 1985–86 and 14 more in 1986–87. Cherry had been replaced by Terry Dolan, who built a team pushing for promotion to Division One in 1987–88. Hendrie was one of the key men, scoring 13 goals, but he was sent off in a 2–2 draw at Manchester City on 23 April 1988. His subsequent suspension meant he missed the final league game of the season, as City lost 3–2 to Ipswich Town and missed out on promotion. It was the only league game Hendrie missed during his time at Valley Parade, and his 173 consecutive league appearances has only been beaten by Geoff Smith with City. Hendrie came back for the play-off games with Middlesbrough but after defeat he signed for Newcastle United for £500,000.

=== Newcastle United and Leeds United ===
Hendrie's career stalled at Newcastle United in a difficult season for the Magpies and he soon moved on to Leeds United. He spent just one season at Leeds but was voted in the top 100 Leeds players in 2000.

=== Middlesbrough ===
He played as a deep-lying striker for Middlesbrough and helped them win promotion to the newly founded FA Premier League in 1992, where on 5 December 1992 he scored a hat-trick in a 3–2 win against Blackburn Rovers. Hendrie was their leading scorer in 1995 when they won promotion back to the top flight. He secured legendary status on Teesside by scoring the last goal at Ayresome Park.

=== Barnsley ===
He left the following year after losing his place in the first team to Juninho Paulista, and joined Division One side Barnsley. Once again, Hendrie contributed towards his club winning promotion as Barnsley finished Division One runners-up and became top division members for the first time in their history. Hendrie was unable to prevent Barnsley from suffering relegation in 1997–98, and after the end of the season he succeeded Danny Wilson as manager.

== Managerial career ==
John Hendrie was sacked on 19 April 1999 after just one season in charge of Barnsley, having failed to achieve a promotion play off place.

== Personal life ==
Hendrie is married to Linda, with whom he has three sons, Joe, Luke and Jordan, and a daughter Lauren. They live in Menston. Two of his three sons are junior footballers; Luke playing at Bradford City, Jordan with Guiseley. Both attended St. Mary's Catholic High School, Menston.

== Managerial statistics ==
As of 31 August 2009

Team	Nat	From	To	Record				
Team	Nat	From	To	G	W	D	L	Win %
Barnsley	(England)	7 July 1998	19 April 1999	54	19	18	17	35.19

== Honours ==
Bradford City

- Football League Third Division: 1984–85

Leeds United

- Football League Second Division: 1989–90

Middlesbrough

- Football League First Division: 1994–95

Individual

- PFA Team of the Year: 1986–87 Second Division, 1987–88 Second Division, 1994–95 First Division
- Newcastle United Player of the Year: 1988–89
- Barnsley Player of the Year: 1996–97
