= Matty Appleby =

English footballer (born 1972)

Personal information
- Full name: Matthew Wilfred Appleby
- Date of birth: 16 April 1972 (age 54)
- Place of birth: Middlesbrough, England
- Height: 5 ft 8 in (1.73 m)
- Position: Midfielder

Youth career
- ?–1990: Newcastle United

Senior career*
Years	Team	Apps	(Gls)
1990–1994	Newcastle United	20	(0)
1993	→ Darlington (loan)	10	(0)
1994–1996	Darlington	79	(7)
1996–2002	Barnsley	139	(7)
2002	→ Oldham Athletic (loan)	7	(2)
2002–2005	Oldham Athletic	39	(0)
2005–2006	Darlington	36	(0)
2006–2008	Whitby Town	83	(6)
- * Club domestic league appearances and goals as of 12:54, 30 July 2008 (UTC)

Matthew Wilfred Appleby (born 16 April 1972 in Middlesbrough) is an English former football midfielder who retired in 2008. He played in the Premier League with Barnsley and had a distinguished spell at Darlington, before dropping into non-League and eventually leaving football to become a deep-sea diver.
