= John Bolles =

John Bolles may refer to:

- John A. Bolles (1809–1878), Massachusetts Secretary of the Commonwealth
- John Savage Bolles (1905–1983), American architect
- Sir John Bolles, 1st Baronet (c. 1580–1648), of the Bolles baronets
- Sir John Bolles, 3rd Baronet (1641–1686), of the Bolles baronets
- Sir John Bolles, 4th Baronet (1669–1714), MP for Lincoln

== See also ==
- Bolles (disambiguation)
