= Fear =

Basic emotion induced by a perceived threat

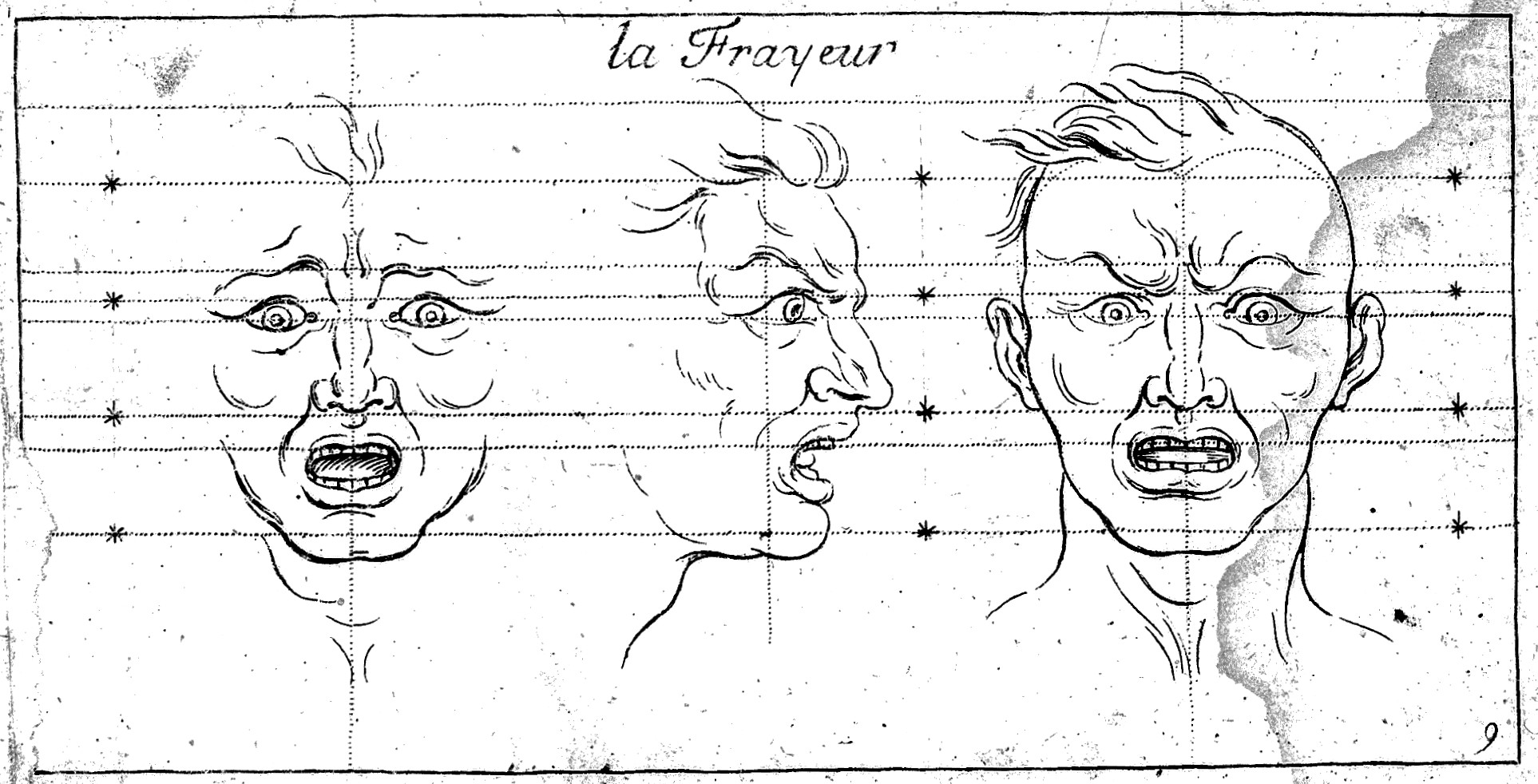
"Fear", from Charles le Brun: "Caractères des passions", c. 1720

Fear is an emotional state which is aroused by threatening situations. It is usually considered to be a negative, unpleasant emotion. The feeling of fear can result directly from certain kinds of sensory stimulation, such as sounds which resemble screaming. Fear can also be evoked by the anticipation that undesirable events will, or may, occur, and is useful in providing motivation to avoid or mitigate risks. It may also be the result of imagining threats to oneself or others, whether or not those threats are real or possible.

Fear is associated with a number of physiological states. In humans, fear is correlated with more rapid breathing and heart rate, dilation of the pupils, spikes in cortisol levels, and elevated electrodermal activity. These changes overlap considerably with the physiology of anger, sadness, disgust, anxiety, and other negative, arousing emotions. Fear is also associated with behavioural reactions like the startle response, the fight-or-flight response, and the freeze response.

The physiological and behavioural effects of fear are not unique to humans, and have routinely been used to identify fear in both non-human vertebrates and invertebrates. However, understanding the experience of fear in other animals is rendered difficult by the inability of non-humans to communicate their experiences in language. Contemporary neuroscientific research into the brains of vertebrates suggests a view in which neural structures associated with fear are fully integrated into the non-hierarchical, dynamic cognitive systems which allow animals, both human and non-human, to flexibly respond to complex situations.

The subjective experience of fear, including the distinction between fear and other emotions, is heavily affected by individual differences, situational factors, and cultural ways of thinking. Assuming that fear only refers to a single distinct phenomenon can therefore be unhelpful and inaccurate. Fear may be experienced as pleasurable and is intentionally evoked by certain forms of leisure: it is often a component of thrilling or adventurous experiences, and is crucial to forms of popular media like horror films. Maladaptive levels of fear are closely associated with a number of mental disorders, including specific phobias and internalizing psychopathologies like depression, anxiety, and suicidality.

A man showing signs of fear

== Causes ==
An influential categorization of stimuli causing fear was proposed by psychologist Jeffrey Alan Gray; namely, intensity, novelty, special evolutionary dangers, stimuli arising during social interaction, and conditioned stimuli. Another categorization was proposed by Archer, who, besides conditioned fear stimuli, categorized fear-evoking (as well as aggression-evoking) stimuli into three groups; namely, pain, novelty, and frustration, although he also described "looming", which refers to an object rapidly moving towards the visual sensors of a subject, and can be categorized as "intensity". Russell described a more functional categorization of fear-evoking stimuli, in which for instance novelty is a variable affecting more than one category: 1) Predator stimuli (including movement, suddenness, proximity, but also learned and innate predator stimuli); 2) Physical environmental dangers (including intensity and heights); 3) Stimuli associated with increased risk of predation and other dangers (including novelty, openness, illumination, and being alone); 4) Stimuli stemming from conspecifics (including novelty, movement, and spacing behavior); 5) Species-predictable fear stimuli and experience (special evolutionary dangers); and 6) Fear stimuli that are not species predictable (conditioned fear stimuli).

=== Nature ===
Although many fears are learned, the capacity to fear is part of human nature. Many studies have found that certain fears (e.g., animals, heights) are much more common than others (e.g., flowers, clouds). These fears are also easier to induce in the laboratory. This phenomenon is known as preparedness. Because early humans that were quick to fear dangerous situations were more likely to survive and reproduce; preparedness is theorized to be a genetic effect that is the result of natural selection.

From an evolutionary psychology perspective, different fears may be different adaptations that have been useful in our evolutionary past. They may have developed during different time periods. Some fears, such as fear of heights (acrophobia), may be common to all mammals and developed during the Mesozoic period. Other fears, such as fear of snakes, may be common to all simians and developed during the Cenozoic time period (the still-ongoing geological era encompassing the last 66 million of history). Still others, such as fear of mice and insects, may be unique to humans and developed during the Paleolithic and Neolithic time periods (when mice and insects became important carriers of infectious diseases and harmful for crops and stored foods).

=== Conditioning ===
Nonhuman animals and humans innovate specific fears as a result of learning. This has been studied in psychology as fear conditioning, beginning with John B. Watson's Little Albert experiment in 1920, which was inspired after observing a child with an irrational fear of dogs. In this study, an 11-month-old boy was conditioned to fear a white rat in the laboratory. The fear became generalized to include other white, furry objects, such as a rabbit, dog, and even a Santa Claus mask with white cotton balls in the beard.

Fear can be learned by experiencing or watching a frightening traumatic accident. For example, a child falling into a well and struggling to get out may develop a fear of wells, heights (acrophobia), enclosed spaces (claustrophobia), or water (aquaphobia). There are studies looking at areas of the brain that are affected in relation to fear. When looking at these areas (such as the amygdala), it was proposed that a person learns to fear regardless of whether they themselves have experienced trauma, or if they have observed the fear in others. In a study completed by Andreas Olsson, Katherine I. Nearing and Elizabeth A. Phelps, the amygdala were affected both when subjects observed someone else being submitted to an aversive event, knowing that the same treatment awaited themselves, and when subjects were subsequently placed in a fear-provoking situation. This suggests that fear can develop in both conditions, not just simply from personal history.

Fear is affected by cultural and historical context. For example, in the early 20th century, many Americans feared polio, a disease that can lead to paralysis. There are consistent cross-cultural differences in how people respond to fear. Display rules affect how likely people are to express the facial expression of fear and other emotions.

Fear of victimization is a function of perceived risk and seriousness of potential harm.

== Common triggers ==
=== Phobias ===
According to surveys, some of the most common fears are of demons and ghosts, the existence of evil powers, cockroaches, spiders, snakes, heights, water, enclosed spaces, tunnels, bridges, needles, social rejection, failure, examinations, and public speaking.

Regionally some may more so fear terrorist attacks, death, war, criminal or gang violence, being alone, the future, nuclear war, flying, clowns, intimacy, people, labels, and driving.

=== Uncertainty ===
Fear of the unknown or irrational fear is caused by negative thinking (worry) which arises from anxiety accompanied by a subjective sense of apprehension or dread. Irrational fear shares a common neural pathway with other fears, a pathway that engages the nervous system to mobilize bodily resources in the face of danger or threat. Many people are scared of the "unknown". The irrational fear can branch out to many areas such as the hereafter, the next ten years or even tomorrow. Chronic irrational fear has deleterious effects since the elicitor stimulus is commonly absent or perceived from delusions. Such fear can create comorbidity with the umbrella. Being scared may cause people to experience anticipatory fear of what may lie ahead rather than planning and evaluating for the same. For example, "continuation of scholarly education" is perceived by many educators as a risk that may cause them fear and stress, and they would rather teach things they've been taught than go and do research.

The ambiguity of situations that tend to be uncertain and unpredictable can cause anxiety in addition to other psychological and physical problems in some populations; especially those who engage it constantly, for example, in war-ridden places or in places of conflict, terrorism, abuse, etc. Poor parenting that instills fear can also debilitate a child's development or personality. For example, parents tell their children not to talk to strangers in order to protect them. In school, they would be motivated to not show fear in talking with strangers, but to be assertive and also aware of the risks and the environment in which it takes place. Ambiguous and mixed messages like this can affect their self-esteem and self-confidence. Researchers say talking to strangers is not something to be thwarted but allowed in a parent's presence if required. Developing a sense of equanimity to handle various situations is often advocated as an antidote to irrational fear and as an essential skill by a number of ancient philosophies.

Fear of the unknown (FOTU) "may be a, or possibly the, fundamental fear" from early times when there were many threats to life.

== Behavior ==
Animals experiencing fear may undergo a variety of changes in behaviour, depending on their species and context. One influential categorization divides responses based around immobility from responses based around avoidance. Immobility responses includes the freeze response, in which an animal becomes motionless but remains alert and capable of movement, as well as tonic immobility or "playing dead," whereby an animal becomes temporarily paralyzed and unresponsive. Although these responses do not act to remove an animal from a threatening situation, they serve to increase the probability of survival. Avoidance responses notably include the widely-observed fight-or-flight response, which promotes fleeing from a threatening situation when escape is possible and responding with aggression when escape is impossible. Certain defensive reactions function by producing swift, automatic responses to threatening stimuli, such as the startle response to unexpected sounds or movements and the looming response to approaching objects. Threat display is a fear response by which an animal attempts to frighten or startle a threatening animal by feigning to have defensive capacities that they do not actually possess. Defensive burying is an instinctive fear response common in rodents in which material on the ground is displaced with the extremities and then shovelled at a noxious stimulus in order to bury it. Other responses to fear are social, including vocalizing alarm to alert nearby animals and displaying submission to the threatening animal.

The type of fear behaviour exhibited by an animal can be determined both by the intensity of their fear and by a variety of circumstantial factors. Environmental characteristics, such as the presence of an escape route and how distant the animal is from a known refuge, can affect fear responses. Responses are likewise affected by whether the perceived threat can be discretely located and, if so, how distant it is, its size, its speed, how directly it is approaching, and whether the animal has experienced this type of threat before. Other determinants of fear behaviour derive from the condition of the animal who is afraid, including their own size, their speed while in movement, their physical condition, their ability to defend themselves or to avoid detection, and their social situation.

Fear responses are generally facilitated by corresponding physiological changes. In humans, these changes include hyperventilation, increased heart rate and blood pressure, dilation of the pupils, and increased sweat gland activity leading to elevated electrodermal activity. Contraction of muscles attached to hair follicles may lead to piloerection or "goose bumps," which in other mammals such as porcupines serves to create a threatening appearance. The physiological changes associated with fear in humans are not consistent, and have been found to vary depending on the individual, the situation, and the fear responses being exhibited. Observing physiological changes associated with fear can allow a person to consciously recognize that they are afraid. Experiencing dizziness, lightheadedness, sweating, shortness of breath, vomiting or nausea, numbness, shaking, or a feeling of butterflies in the stomach may contribute to this apprehension.

== Mechanism ==
Often laboratory studies with rats are conducted to examine the acquisition and extinction of conditioned fear responses. In 2004, researchers conditioned rats (Rattus norvegicus) to fear a certain stimulus, through electric shock. The researchers were able to then cause an extinction of this conditioned fear, to a point that no medications or drugs were able to further aid in the extinction process. The rats showed signs of avoidance learning, not fear, but simply avoiding the area that brought pain to the test rats. The avoidance learning of rats is seen as a conditioned response, and therefore the behavior can be unconditioned, as supported by the earlier research.

Species-specific defense reactions (SSDRs) or avoidance learning in nature is the specific tendency to avoid certain threats or stimuli, it is how animals survive in the wild. Humans and animals both share these species-specific defense reactions, such as the flight-or-fight, which also include pseudo-aggression, fake or intimidating aggression and freeze response to threats, which is controlled by the sympathetic nervous system. These SSDRs are learned very quickly through social interactions between others of the same species, other species, and interaction with the environment. These acquired sets of reactions or responses are not easily forgotten. The animal that survives is the animal that already knows what to fear and how to avoid this threat. An example in humans is the reaction to the sight of a snake, many jump backwards before cognitively realizing what they are jumping away from, and in some cases, it is a stick rather than a snake.

As with many functions of the brain, there are various regions of the brain involved in deciphering fear in humans and other nonhuman species. The amygdala communicates both directions between the prefrontal cortex, hypothalamus, the sensory cortex, the hippocampus, thalamus, septum, and the brainstem. The amygdala plays an important role in SSDR, such as the ventral amygdalofugal, which is essential for associative learning, and SSDRs are learned through interaction with the environment and others of the same species. An emotional response is created only after the signals have been relayed between the different regions of the brain, activating the sympathetic nervous systems which controls the flight, fight, freeze, fright, and faint response. A damaged amygdala can cause transformation in the recognition of fear: this is the case in Urbach–Wiethe disease, which destroys both of a human's amygdalae in early childhood. One prominent example of this condition is the patient S.M.

Robert C. Bolles (1970), a researcher at University of Washington, wanted to understand species-specific defense reactions and avoidance learning among animals, but found that the theories of avoidance learning and the tools that were used to measure this tendency were out of touch with the natural world. He theorized the species-specific defense reaction (SSDR). There are three forms of SSDRs: flight, fight (pseudo-aggression), or freeze. Even domesticated animals have SSDRs, and in those moments it is seen that animals revert to atavistic standards and become "wild" again. Dr. Bolles states that responses are often dependent on the reinforcement of a safety signal, and not the aversive conditioned stimuli. This safety signal can be a source of feedback or even stimulus change. Intrinsic feedback or information coming from within, muscle twitches, increased heart rate, are seen to be more important in SSDRs than extrinsic feedback, stimuli that comes from the external environment. Dr. Bolles found that most creatures have some intrinsic set of fears, to help assure survival of the species. Rats will run away from any shocking event, and pigeons will flap their wings harder when threatened. The wing flapping in pigeons and the scattered running of rats are considered species-specific defense reactions or behaviors. Bolles believed that SSDRs are conditioned through Pavlovian conditioning, and not operant conditioning; SSDRs arise from the association between the environmental stimuli and adverse events. Michael S. Fanselow conducted an experiment, to test some specific defense reactions, he observed that rats in two different shock situations responded differently, based on instinct or defensive topography, rather than contextual information.

Species-specific defense responses are created out of fear, and are essential for survival. Rats that lack the gene stathmin show no avoidance learning, or a lack of fear, and will often walk directly up to cats and be eaten. Animals use these SSDRs to continue living, to help increase their chance of fitness, by surviving long enough to procreate. Humans and animals alike have created fear to know what should be avoided, and this fear can be learned through association with others in the community, or learned through personal experience with a creature, species, or situations that should be avoided. SSDRs are an evolutionary adaptation that has been seen in many species throughout the world including rats, chimpanzees, prairie dogs, and even humans, an adaptation created to help individual creatures survive in a hostile world.

Fear learning changes across the lifetime due to natural developmental changes in the brain. This includes changes in the prefrontal cortex and the amygdala.

The visual exploration of an emotional face does not follow a fixed pattern but modulated by the emotional content of the face. Scheller et al. found that participants paid more attention to the eyes when recognising fearful or neutral faces, while the mouth was fixated on when happy faces are presented, irrespective of task demands and spatial locations of face stimuli. These findings were replicated when fearful eyes are presented and when canonical face configurations are distorted for fearful, neutral and happy expressions.

=== Neurocircuitry in mammals ===
- The thalamus collects sensory data from the senses
- Sensory cortex receives data from the thalamus and interprets it
- Sensory cortex organizes information for dissemination to the hypothalamus (fight or flight), amygdalae (fear), hippocampus (memory)

The brain structures that are the center of most neurobiological events associated with fear are the two amygdalae, located behind the pituitary gland. Each amygdala is part of a circuitry of fear learning. They are essential for proper adaptation to stress and specific modulation of emotional learning memory. In the presence of a threatening stimulus, the amygdalae generate the secretion of hormones that influence fear and aggression. Once a response to the stimulus in the form of fear or aggression commences, the amygdalae may elicit the release of hormones into the body to put the person into a state of alertness, in which they are ready to move, run, fight, etc. This defensive response is generally referred to in physiology as the fight-or-flight response regulated by the hypothalamus, part of the limbic system. Once the person is in safe mode, meaning that there are no longer any potential threats surrounding them, the amygdalae will send this information to the medial prefrontal cortex (mPFC) where it is stored for similar future situations, which is known as memory consolidation.

Some of the hormones involved during the state of fight-or-flight include epinephrine, which regulates heart rate and metabolism as well as dilating blood vessels and air passages, norepinephrine increasing heart rate, blood flow to skeletal muscles and the release of glucose from energy stores, and cortisol which increases blood sugar, increases circulating neutrophilic leukocytes, calcium amongst other things.

After a situation which incites fear occurs, the amygdalae and hippocampus record the event through synaptic plasticity. The stimulation to the hippocampus will cause the individual to remember many details surrounding the situation. Plasticity and memory formation in the amygdala are generated by activation of the neurons in the region. Experimental data supports the notion that synaptic plasticity of the neurons leading to the lateral amygdalae occurs with fear conditioning. In some cases, this forms permanent fear responses such as post-traumatic stress disorder (PTSD) or a phobia. MRI and fMRI scans have shown that the amygdalae in individuals diagnosed with such disorders including bipolar or panic disorder are larger and wired for a higher level of fear.

Pathogens can suppress amygdala activity. Rats infected with the toxoplasmosis parasite become less fearful of cats, sometimes even seeking out their urine-marked areas. This behavior often leads to them being eaten by cats. The parasite then reproduces within the body of the cat. There is evidence that the parasite concentrates itself in the amygdala of infected rats. In a separate experiment, rats with lesions in the amygdala did not express fear or anxiety towards unwanted stimuli. These rats pulled on levers supplying food that sometimes sent out electrical shocks. While they learned to avoid pressing on them, they did not distance themselves from these shock-inducing levers.

Several brain structures other than the amygdalae have also been observed to be activated when individuals are presented with fearful vs. neutral faces, namely the occipitocerebellar regions including the fusiform gyrus and the inferior parietal / superior temporal gyri. Fearful eyes, brows and mouth seem to separately reproduce these brain responses. Scientists from Zurich studies show that the hormone oxytocin related to stress and sex reduces activity in your brain fear center.

==== Pheromones and contagion ====
In threatening situations, insects, aquatic organisms, birds, reptiles, and mammals emit odorant substances, initially called alarm substances, which are chemical signals now called alarm pheromones. This is to defend themselves and at the same time to inform members of the same species of danger and leads to observable behavior change like freezing, defensive behavior, or dispersion depending on circumstances and species. For example, stressed rats release odorant cues that cause other rats to move away from the source of the signal.

After the discovery of pheromones in 1959, alarm pheromones were first described in 1968 in ants and earthworms, and four years later also found in mammals, both mice and rats. Over the next two decades, identification and characterization of these pheromones proceeded in all manner of insects and sea animals, including fish, but it was not until 1990 that more insight into mammalian alarm pheromones was gleaned.

In 1985, a link between odors released by stressed rats and pain perception was discovered: unstressed rats exposed to these odors developed opioid-mediated analgesia. In 1997, researchers found that bees became less responsive to pain after they had been stimulated with isoamyl acetate, a chemical smelling of banana, and a component of bee alarm pheromone. The experiment also showed that the bees' fear-induced pain tolerance was mediated by an endorphin.

By using the forced swimming test in rats as a model of fear-induction, the first mammalian "alarm substance" was found. In 1991, this "alarm substance" was shown to fulfill criteria for pheromones: well-defined behavioral effect, species specificity, minimal influence of experience and control for nonspecific arousal. Rat activity testing with the alarm pheromone, and their preference/avoidance for odors from cylinders containing the pheromone, showed that the pheromone had very low volatility.

In 1993 a connection between alarm chemosignals in mice and their immune response was found. Pheromone production in mice was found to be associated with or mediated by the pituitary gland in 1994.

In 2004, it was demonstrated that rats' alarm pheromones had different effects on the "recipient" rat (the rat perceiving the pheromone) depending which body region they were released from: Pheromone production from the face modified behavior in the recipient rat, e.g. caused sniffing or movement, whereas pheromone secreted from the rat's anal area induced autonomic nervous system stress responses, like an increase in core body temperature. Further experiments showed that when a rat perceived alarm pheromones, it increased its defensive and risk assessment behavior, and its acoustic startle reflex was enhanced.

It was not until 2011 that a link between severe pain, neuroinflammation and alarm pheromones release in rats was found: real time RT-PCR analysis of rat brain tissues indicated that shocking the footpad of a rat increased its production of proinflammatory cytokines in deep brain structures, namely of IL-1β, heteronuclear Corticotropin-releasing hormone and c-fos mRNA expressions in both the paraventricular nucleus and the bed nucleus of the stria terminalis, and it increased stress hormone levels in plasma (corticosterone).

The neurocircuit for how rats perceive alarm pheromones was shown to be related to the hypothalamus, brainstem, and amygdalae, all of which are evolutionary ancient structures deep inside or in the case of the brainstem underneath the brain away from the cortex, and involved in the fight-or-flight response, as is the case in humans.

Alarm pheromone-induced anxiety in rats has been used to evaluate the degree to which anxiolytics can alleviate anxiety in humans. For this, the change in the acoustic startle reflex of rats with alarm pheromone-induced anxiety (i.e. reduction of defensiveness) has been measured. Pretreatment of rats with one of five anxiolytics used in clinical medicine was able to reduce their anxiety: namely midazolam, phenelzine (a nonselective monoamine oxidase (MAO) inhibitor), propranolol, a nonselective beta blocker, clonidine, an alpha 2 adrenergic agonist or CP-154,526, a corticotropin-releasing hormone antagonist.

Faulty development of odor discrimination impairs the perception of pheromones and pheromone-related behavior, like aggressive behavior and mating in male rats: The enzyme Mitogen-activated protein kinase 7 (MAPK7) has been implicated in regulating the development of the olfactory bulb and odor discrimination and it is highly expressed in developing rat brains, but absent in most regions of adult rat brains. Conditional deletion of the MAPK7gene in mouse neural stem cells impairs several pheromone-mediated behaviors, including aggression and mating in male mice. These behavior impairments were not caused by a reduction in the level of testosterone, by physical immobility, by heightened fear or anxiety or by depression. Using mouse urine as a natural pheromone-containing solution, it has been shown that the impairment was associated with defective detection of related pheromones, and with changes in their inborn preference for pheromones related to sexual and reproductive activities.

Lastly, alleviation of an acute fear response because a friendly peer (or in biological language: an affiliative conspecific) tends and befriends is called "social buffering". The term is in analogy to the 1985 "buffering" hypothesis in psychology, where social support has been proven to mitigate the negative health effects of alarm pheromone mediated distress. The role of a "social pheromone" is suggested by the recent discovery that olfactory signals are responsible in mediating the "social buffering" in male rats. "Social buffering" was also observed to mitigate the conditioned fear responses of honeybees. A bee colony exposed to an environment of high threat of predation did not show increased aggression and aggressive-like gene expression patterns in individual bees, but decreased aggression. That the bees did not simply habituate to threats is suggested by the fact that the disturbed colonies also decreased their foraging.

Biologists have proposed in 2012 that fear pheromones evolved as molecules of "keystone significance", a term coined in analogy to keystone species. Pheromones may determine species compositions and affect rates of energy and material exchange in an ecological community. Thus pheromones generate structure in a food web and play critical roles in maintaining natural systems.

==== Humans ====
Evidence of chemosensory alarm signals in humans has emerged slowly: Although alarm pheromones have not been physically isolated and their chemical structures have not been identified in humans so far, there is evidence for their presence. Androstadienone, for example, a steroidal, endogenous odorant, is a pheromone candidate found in human sweat, axillary hair and plasma. The closely related compound androstenone is involved in communicating dominance, aggression or competition; sex hormone influences on androstenone perception in humans showed a high testosterone level related to heightened androstenone sensitivity in men, a high testosterone level related to unhappiness in response to androstenone in men, and a high estradiol level related to disliking of androstenone in women.

A German study from 2006 showed when anxiety-induced versus exercise-induced human sweat from a dozen people was pooled and offered to seven study participants, of five able to olfactorily distinguish exercise-induced sweat from room air, three could also distinguish exercise-induced sweat from anxiety induced sweat. The acoustic startle reflex response to a sound when sensing anxiety sweat was larger than when sensing exercise-induced sweat, as measured by electromyography analysis of the orbital muscle, which is responsible for the eyeblink component. This showed for the first time that fear chemosignals can modulate the startle reflex in humans without emotional mediation; fear chemosignals primed the recipient's "defensive behavior" prior to the subjects' conscious attention on the acoustic startle reflex level.

In analogy to the social buffering of rats and honeybees in response to chemosignals, induction of empathy by "smelling anxiety" of another person has been found in humans.

A study from 2013 provided brain imaging evidence that human responses to fear chemosignals may be gender-specific. Researchers collected alarm-induced sweat and exercise-induced sweat from donors extracted it, pooled it and presented it to 16 unrelated people undergoing functional brain MRI. While stress-induced sweat from males produced a comparably strong emotional response in both females and males, stress-induced sweat from females produced markedly stronger arousal in women than in men. Statistical tests pinpointed this gender-specificity to the right amygdala and strongest in the superficial nuclei. Since no significant differences were found in the olfactory bulb, the response to female fear-induced signals is likely based on processing the meaning, i.e. on the emotional level, rather than the strength of chemosensory cues from each gender, i.e. the perceptual level.

An approach-avoidance task was set up where volunteers seeing either an angry or a happy cartoon face on a computer screen pushed away or pulled toward them a joystick as fast as possible. Volunteers smelling androstadienone, masked with clove oil scent responded faster, especially to angry faces than those smelling clove oil only, which was interpreted as androstadienone-related activation of the fear system. A potential mechanism of action is, that androstadienone alters the "emotional face processing". Androstadienone is known to influence the activity of the fusiform gyrus which is relevant for face recognition.

=== Cognitive-consistency theory ===
Cognitive-consistency theories assume that "when two or more simultaneously active cognitive structures are logically inconsistent, arousal is increased, which activates processes with the expected consequence of increasing consistency and decreasing arousal." In this context, it has been proposed that fear behavior is caused by an inconsistency between a preferred, or expected, situation and the actually perceived situation, and functions to remove the inconsistent stimulus from the perceptual field, for instance by fleeing or hiding, thereby resolving the inconsistency. This approach puts fear in a broader perspective, also involving aggression and curiosity. When the inconsistency between perception and expectancy is small, learning as a result of curiosity reduces inconsistency by updating expectancy to match perception. If the inconsistency is larger, fear or aggressive behavior may be employed to alter the perception in order to make it match expectancy, depending on the size of the inconsistency as well as the specific context. Aggressive behavior is assumed to alter perception by forcefully manipulating it into matching the expected situation, while in some cases thwarted escape may also trigger aggressive behavior in an attempt to remove the thwarting stimulus.

== Research ==
To improve our understanding of the neural and behavioral mechanisms of adaptive and maladaptive fear, investigators use a variety of translational animal models. These models are particularly important for research that would be too invasive for human studies. Rodents such as mice and rats are common animal models, but other species are used. Certain aspects of fear research still requires more research such as sex, gender, and age differences.

=== Models ===
These animal models include, but are not limited to, fear conditioning, predator-based psychosocial stress, single prolonged stress, chronic stress models, inescapable foot/tail shocks, immobilization or restraint, and stress enhanced fear learning. While the stress and fear paradigms differ between the models, they tend to involve aspects such as acquisition, generalization, extinction, cognitive regulation, and reconsolidation.

==== Pavlovian ====
Fear conditioning, also known as Pavlovian or classical conditioning, is a process of learning that involves pairing a neutral stimulus with an unconditional stimulus (US). A neutral stimulus is something like a bell, tone, or room that does not elicit a response normally where a US is a stimulus that results in a natural or unconditioned response (UR) – in Pavlov's famous experiment the neutral stimulus is a bell and the US would be food with the dog's salvation being the UR. Pairing the neutral stimulus and the US results in the UR occurring not only with the US but also the neutral stimulus. When this occurs the neutral stimulus is referred to as the conditional stimulus (CS) and the response the conditional response (CR). In the fear conditioning model of Pavlovian conditioning the US is an aversive stimulus such as a shock, tone, or unpleasant odor.

==== Predator-based psychosocial stress ====
Predator-based psychosocial stress (PPS) involves a more naturalistic approach to fear learning. Predators such as a cat, a snake, or urine from a fox or cat are used along with other stressors such as immobilization or restraint in order to generate instinctual fear responses.

==== Chronic stress models ====
Chronic stress models include chronic variable stress, chronic social defeat, and chronic mild stress. These models are often used to study how long-term or prolonged stress/pain can alter fear learning and disorders.

==== Single prolonged stress ====
Single prolonged stress (SPS) is a fear model that is often used to study PTSD. Its paradigm involves multiple stressors such as immobilization, a force swim, and exposure to ether delivered concurrently to the subject. This is used to study non-naturalistic, uncontrollable situations that can cause a maladaptive fear responses that is seen in a lot of anxiety and traumatic based disorders.

==== Stress enhanced fear learning ====
Stress enhanced fear learning (SEFL) like SPS is often used to study the maladaptive fear learning involved in PTSD and other traumatic based disorders. SEFL involves a single extreme stressor such as a large number of footshocks simulating a single traumatic stressor that somehow enhances and alters future fear learning.

== Management ==
=== Pharmaceutical ===
A drug treatment for fear conditioning and phobias via the amygdalae is the use of glucocorticoids. In one study, glucocorticoid receptors in the central nuclei of the amygdalae were disrupted in order to better understand the mechanisms of fear and fear conditioning. The glucocorticoid receptors were inhibited using lentiviral vectors containing Cre-recombinase injected into mice. Results showed that disruption of the glucocorticoid receptors prevented conditioned fear behavior. The mice were subjected to auditory cues which caused them to freeze normally. A reduction of freezing was observed in the mice that had inhibited glucocorticoid receptors.

=== Psychological ===
Cognitive behavioral therapy has been successful in helping people overcome their fear. Because fear is more complex than just forgetting or deleting memories, an active and successful approach involves people repeatedly confronting their fears. By confronting their fears in a safe manner a person can suppress the "fear-triggering memories" or stimuli.

Exposure therapy has known to have helped up to 90% of people with specific phobias to significantly decrease their fear over time.

Another psychological treatment is systematic desensitization, which is a type of behavior therapy used to completely remove the fear or produce a disgusted response to this fear and replace it. The replacement that occurs will be relaxation and will occur through conditioning. Through conditioning treatments, muscle tensioning will lessen and deep breathing techniques will aid in de-tensioning.

=== Literary and religious ===
There are other methods for treating or coping with one's fear, such as writing down rational thoughts regarding fears. Journal entries are a healthy method of expressing one's fears without compromising safety or causing uncertainty. Another suggestion is a fear ladder. To create a fear ladder, one must write down all of their fears and score them on a scale of one to ten. Next, the person addresses their phobia, starting with the lowest number.

Religion can help some individuals cope with fear.

== Society and culture ==
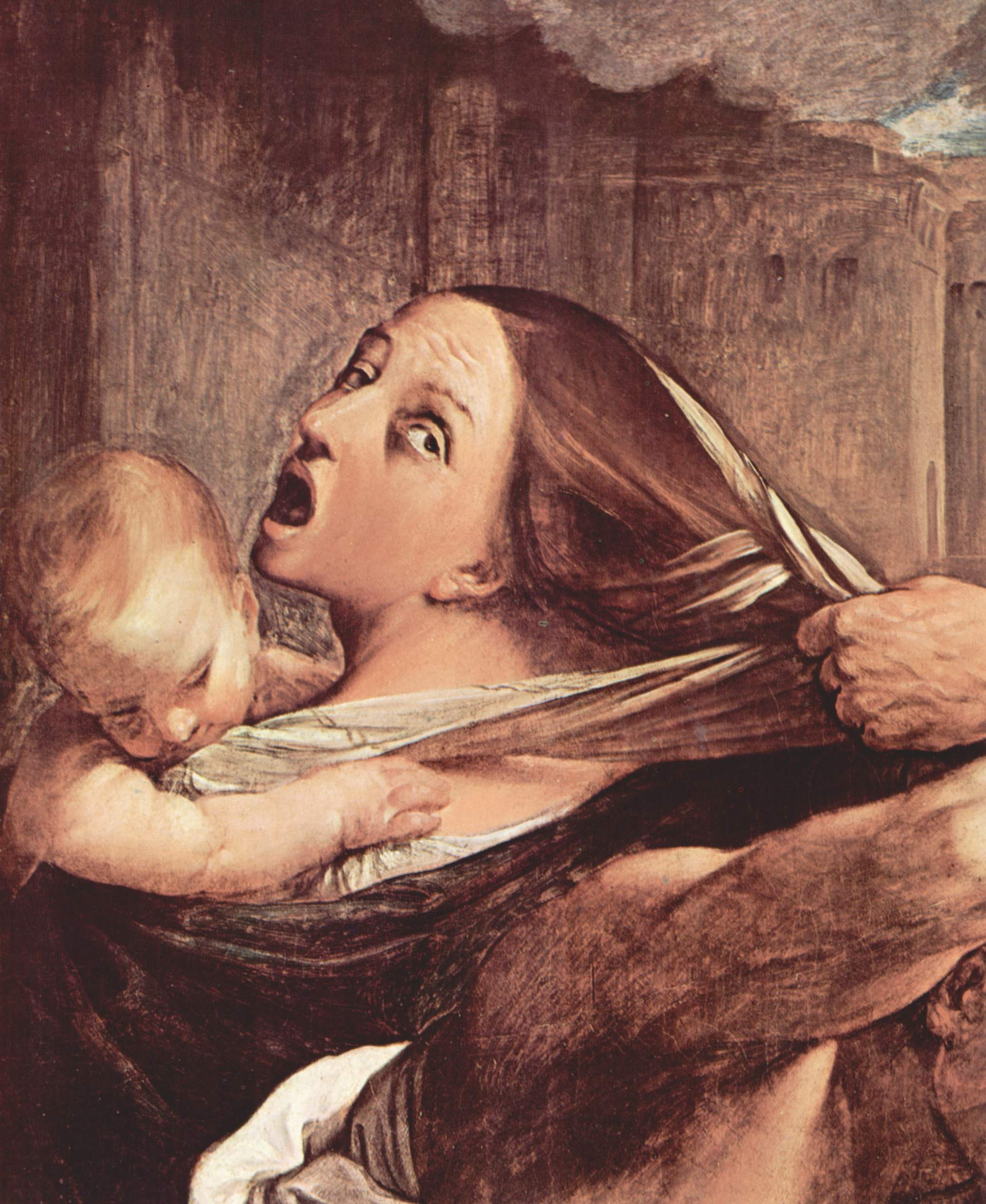
Painting by Guido Reni c. 1611

=== Death ===
The fear of the end of life and its existence is, in other words, the fear of death. Historically, attempts were made to reduce this fear by performing rituals which have helped collect the cultural ideas that we now have in the present. These rituals also helped preserve the cultural ideas. The results and methods of human existence had been changing at the same time that social formation was changing.

When people are faced with their own thoughts of death, they either accept that they are dying or will die because they have lived a full life or they will experience fear. A theory was developed in response to this, which is called the terror management theory. The theory states that a person's cultural worldviews (religion, values, etc.) will mitigate the terror associated with the fear of death through avoidance. To help manage their terror, they find solace in their death-denying beliefs, such as their religion. Another way people cope with their death related fears is pushing any thoughts of death into the future or by avoiding these thoughts all together through distractions. Although there are methods for one coping with the terror associated with their fear of death, not everyone suffers from these same uncertainties. People who believe they have lived life to the "fullest" typically do not fear death.

Death anxiety is multidimensional; it covers "fears related to one's own death, the death of others, fear of the unknown after death, fear of obliteration, and fear of the dying process, which includes fear of a slow death and a painful death".

The Yale philosopher Shelly Kagan examined fear of death in a 2007 Yale open course by examining the following questions: Is fear of death a reasonable appropriate response? What conditions are required and what are appropriate conditions for feeling fear of death? What is meant by fear, and how much fear is appropriate? According to Kagan for fear in general to make sense, three conditions should be met:

1. the object of fear needs to be "something bad"
2. there needs to be a non-negligible chance that the bad state of affairs will happen
3. there needs to be some uncertainty about the bad state of affairs

The amount of fear should be appropriate to the size of "the bad". If the three conditions are not met, fear is an inappropriate emotion. He argues, that death does not meet the first two criteria, even if death is a "deprivation of good things" and even if one believes in a painful afterlife. Because death is certain, it also does not meet the third criterion, but he grants that the unpredictability of when one dies may be cause to a sense of fear.

In a 2003 study of 167 women and 121 men, aged 65–87, low self-efficacy predicted fear of the unknown after death and fear of dying for women and men better than demographics, social support, and physical health. Fear of death was measured by a "Multidimensional Fear of Death Scale" which included the 8 subscales Fear of Dying, Fear of the Dead, Fear of Being Destroyed, Fear for Significant Others, Fear of the Unknown, Fear of Conscious Death, Fear for the Body After Death, and Fear of Premature Death. In hierarchical multiple regression analysis, the most potent predictors of death fears were low "spiritual health efficacy", defined as beliefs relating to one's perceived ability to generate spiritually based faith and inner strength, and low "instrumental efficacy", defined as beliefs relating to one's perceived ability to manage activities of daily living.

Psychologists have tested the hypotheses that fear of death motivates religious commitment, and that assurances about an afterlife alleviate the fear, with equivocal results. Religiosity can be related to fear of death when the afterlife is portrayed as time of punishment. "Intrinsic religiosity", as opposed to mere "formal religious involvement", has been found to be negatively correlated with death anxiety. In a 1976 study of people of various Christian denominations, those who were most firm in their faith, who attended religious services weekly, were the least afraid of dying. The survey found a negative correlation between fear of death and "religious concern".

In a 2006 study of white, Christian men and women the hypothesis was tested that traditional, church-centered religiousness and de-institutionalized spiritual seeking are ways of approaching fear of death in old age. Both religiousness and spirituality were related to positive psychosocial functioning, but only church-centered religiousness protected subjects against the fear of death.

=== Religion ===
Statius in the Thebaid (Book 3, line 661) aired the irreverent suggestion that "fear first made gods in the world".

From a Christian theological perspective, the word fear can encompass more than simple dread. Robert B. Strimple says that fear includes the "... convergence of awe, reverence, adoration, humility..". Some translations of the Bible, such as the New International Version, sometimes express the concept of fear with the word reverence.

A similar phrase, "God-fearing", is sometimes used as a rough synonym for "pious". It is a standard translation for the Arabic word taqwa (Arabic: تقوى; "forbearance, restraint") in Muslim contexts. In Judaism, "fear of God" describes obedience to Jewish law even when invisible to others.

=== Manipulation ===
Fear may be politically and culturally manipulated to persuade citizenry of ideas which would otherwise be widely rejected or dissuade citizenry from ideas which would otherwise be widely supported. In contexts of disasters, nation-states manage the fear not only to provide their citizens with an explanation about the event or blaming some minorities, but also to adjust their previous beliefs.

Fear can alter how a person thinks or reacts to situations because fear has the power to inhibit one's rational way of thinking. As a result, people who do not experience fear, are able to use fear as a tool to manipulate others. People who are experiencing fear, seek preservation through safety and can be manipulated by a person who is there to provide that safety that is being sought after. "When we're afraid, a manipulator can talk us out of the truth we see right in front of us. Words become more real than reality" By this, a manipulator can use our fear to manipulate us out the truth and instead make us believe and trust in their truth. Politicians are notorious for using fear to manipulate the people into supporting their policies. This strategy taps into primal human emotions, leveraging fear of the unknown, external threats, or perceived dangers to influence decision-making.

=== Fiction and mythology ===
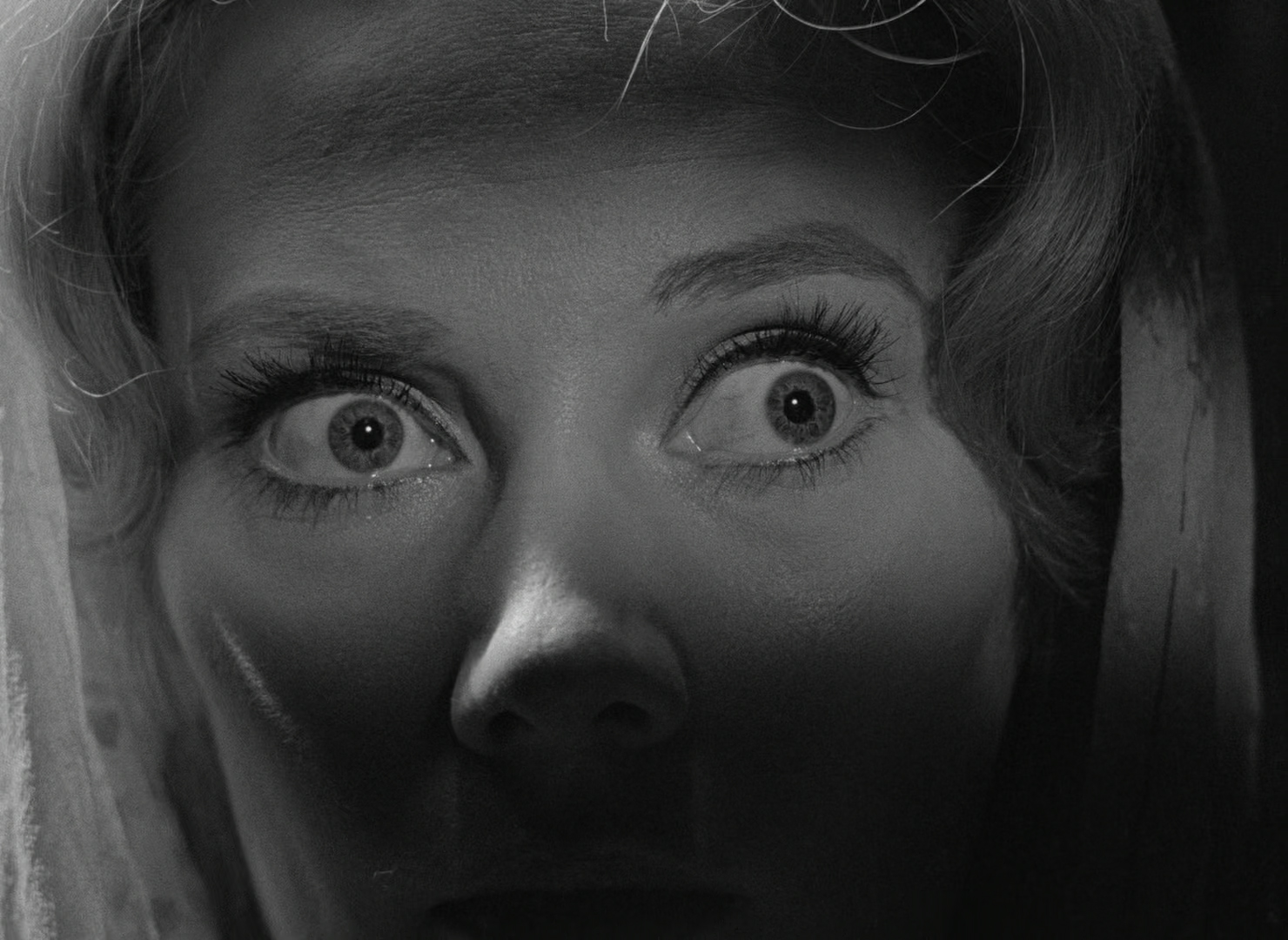
A still from the film Carnival of Souls

Fear is found and reflected in mythology and folklore as well as in works of fiction such as novels and films.

Works of dystopian and (post)apocalyptic fiction convey the fears and anxieties of societies.

The fear of the world's end is about as old as civilization itself. In a 1967 study, Frank Kermode suggests that the failure of religious prophecies led to a shift in how society apprehends this ancient mode. Scientific and critical thought supplanting religious and mythical thought as well as a public emancipation may be the cause of eschatology becoming replaced by more realistic scenarios. Such might constructively provoke discussion and steps to be taken to prevent depicted catastrophes.

The Story of the Youth Who Went Forth to Learn What Fear Was is a German fairy tale dealing with the topic of not knowing fear. Many stories also include characters who fear the antagonist of the plot. One important characteristic of historical and mythical heroes across cultures is to be fearless in the face of big and often lethal enemies.

The Magnus Archives is a fiction horror podcast written by Jonathan Sims and directed by Alexander J. Newall that, among other things, formulates an archetypal ontology of fear through the dissemination of case files at a paranormal research institute set in a world where the metaphysical basis of paranormal activity and unexplainable horrors is fear incarnate. The diegesis states that true categorization of fear is impossible, that fear is all one unknowable thing; however, there exists an ontological structure of fear archetypes in this universe proposed by a fictional version of the architect Robert Smirke. It is a unique construction of fear in that it is not based on the science or neurology of fear, but on thematic and experiential connections between different phobias. For example, the fear of disease and vermin comes from the same place as the fear of abusive relationships, as both lie in fearing corruptions to the self. The final season of the podcast consists almost entirely of poetic meditations on the nature of fear.

Fear in art has been explored by the Japanese scholar Kyoko Nakano, in a series of books and a 2017 exhibition about kowai-e (lit. scary pictures).

=== Athletics ===
In the world of athletics, fear is often used as a means of motivation to not fail. This situation involves using fear in a way that increases the chances of a positive outcome. In this case, the fear that is being created is initially a cognitive state to the receiver. This initial state is what generates the first response of the athlete, this response generates a possibility of fight or flight reaction by the athlete (receiver), which in turn will increase or decrease the possibility of success or failure in the certain situation for the athlete. The amount of time that the athlete has to determine this decision is small but it is still enough time for the receiver to make a determination through cognition. Even though the decision is made quickly, the decision is determined through past events that have been experienced by the athlete. The results of these past events will determine how the athlete will make his cognitive decision in the split second that he or she has.

Fear of failure as described above has been studied frequently in the field of sport psychology. Many scholars have tried to determine how often fear of failure is triggered within athletes, as well as what personalities of athletes most often choose to use this type of motivation. Studies have also been conducted to determine the success rate of this method of motivation.

Murray's Exploration in Personal (1938) was one of the first studies that actually identified fear of failure as an actual motive to avoid failure or to achieve success. His studies suggested that inavoidance, the need to avoid failure, was found in many college-aged men during the time of his research in 1938. This was a monumental finding in the field of psychology because it allowed other researchers to better clarify how fear of failure can actually be a determinant of creating achievement goals as well as how it could be used in the actual act of achievement.

In the context of sport, a model was created by R.S. Lazarus in 1991 that uses the cognitive-motivational-relational theory of emotion.

It holds that Fear of Failure results when beliefs or cognitive schemas about aversive consequences of failing are activated by situations in which failure is possible. These belief systems predispose the individual to make appraisals of threat and experience the state anxiety that is associated with Fear of Failure in evaluative situations.

Another study was done in 2001 by Conroy, Poczwardowski, and Henschen that created five aversive consequences of failing that have been repeated over time. The five categories include (a) experiencing shame and embarrassment, (b) devaluing one's self-estimate, (c) having an uncertain future, (d) important others losing interest, (e) upsetting important others. These five categories can help one infer the possibility of an individual to associate failure with one of these threat categories, which will lead them to experiencing fear of failure.

In summary, the two studies that were done above created a more precise definition of fear of failure, which is "a dispositional tendency to experience apprehension and anxiety in evaluative situations because individuals have learned that failure is associated with aversive consequences".

The author and internet content creator John Green wrote about "the yips"—a common colloquialism for a debilitating, often chronic manifestation of athletic anxiety experienced by some professional athletes—in an essay for his podcast and novel The Anthropocene Reviewed. Green discusses famous examples of when athletic anxiety has ruined careers and juxtaposes it with the nature of general anxiety as a whole. Green settles, however, on a conclusion for the essay evoking resilience and hope in the human condition by describing a circumstance where the baseball player Rick Ankiel reset his career back to the minor leagues as an outfielder after getting the yips as a major league pitcher.

== See also ==
- Phobia
- Appeal to fear
- Culture of fear
- Ecology of fear
- Fear, uncertainty, and doubt
- Hysteria
- Nightmare
- Night terror
- Ontogenetic parade
- Panic attack
- Paranoia
- Phobophobia
- Psychological trauma
- Social anxiety disorder
- Social anxiety
- Stockholm syndrome
- Voodoo death
- Anger
- Trauma
- Sensory overload
- Fight-or-flight response
- Booby Trap
- Scam
