= Robert Bolles =

Robert Bolles may refer to:

- Robert C. Bolles (1928–1994), American psychologist and author
- Sir Robert Bolles, 2nd Baronet (1619–1663), English politician
