= Sir Henry Monson, 3rd Baronet =

English politician

Sir Henry Monson, 3rd Baronet (17 September 1653 – 6 April 1718) of Burton Hall, Burton by Lincoln, Lincolnshire was an English politician. He was a Member of Parliament (MP) for Lincoln at various dates between 1675 and 1689.

He was the eldest surviving son of John Monson, MP for Lincoln, who predeceased his own father in 1674. Monson thus inherited the baronetcy from his grandfather Sir John Monson, 2nd Baronet in 1683.

He succeeded his father as MP for Lincoln in a by-election in 1675, sitting until 1679. He was re-elected to the seat in 1685, sitting until he was ejected in 1689 for being a non-juror (ie for not swearing allegiance to William III).

He died in 1718 and was buried at South Carlton. He had married Elizabeth, the daughter of Charles Cheyne, 1st Viscount Newhaven of Chesham Bois, Buckinghamshire. They had no children and so the baronetcy passed to his brother William.

Parliament of England
Preceded by Sir John Monson; Sir Thomas Meres	Member of Parliament for Lincoln; 1675–1681; With: Sir Thomas Meres	Succeeded by Sir Thomas Hussey, Bt; Sir Thomas Meres
Preceded by Sir Thomas Hussey, Bt; Sir Thomas Meres	Member of Parliament for Lincoln; 1685–1689; With: Sir Thomas Meres 1685–1689; Sir Christopher Nevile 1689	Succeeded by Sir Edward Hussey, Bt; Sir Christopher Nevile
Baronetage of England
Preceded by John Monson	Baronet (of Carleton); 1683–1718	Succeeded by William Monson
