= Sir John Bolles, 4th Baronet =

English politician

Sir John Bolles, 4th Baronet (1669–1714), of Scampton, Lincolnshire, was an English politician.

He was a Member (MP) of the Parliament of England for Lincoln in 1690–1702.

Parliament of England
Preceded by Sir Edward Hussey, Bt; Sir Christopher Nevile	Member of Parliament for Lincoln; 1690–1702; With: Sir Edward Hussey, Bt 1690–1695; William Monson 1695–1698; Sir Edward Hussey, Bt 1698–1701; Sir Thomas Meres 1701; Sir Edward Hussey, Bt 1701–1702	Succeeded by Sir Edward Hussey, Bt; Sir Thomas Meres
Baronetage of England
Preceded by John Bolles	Baronet (of Scampton); 1686–1714	Extinct
