= Neurovation Labs =

Biotechnology company

Neurovation Labs, Inc. is a preclinical stage biotechnology company focused on diagnosing and treating anxiety disorders and in particular posttraumatic stress disorder (PTSD).

== History ==
Neurovation Labs, formed in 2016 and based in New York City, grew out of the research performed by Michael Fanselow and Jennifer Perusini that sought to understand the cause of PTSD on a physiological level. They discovered that PTSD may be manifested through enduring increases in a certain protein (glutamate receptor subunit GluA1 or GRIA1) in the basolateral amygdala, which is a region of the brain central to fear learning. This protein increase provides one of several possible objective indicators of PTSD, cognition, and a variety of other neurological states. The discovery was made using an animal model of some components of PTSD in rodents, acute stress-enhanced fear learning (SEFL). The company is currently developing a PTSD diagnostic and a companion treatment based on these discoveries. As of 2021, Dr. Perusini is in pre-clinical trial mode for a medication that can block GluA1.

Perusini is current CEO of Neurovation Labs. Fanselow currently acts as Director of Research and Richard Zemsky is COO/ in-house counsel.

== Funding/Partnerships ==
In October 2016, Neurovation Labs closed a seed funding round. The financing was completed with the support of individual angel investors based in the United States. The company intends to use the proceeds to further the development of its patent-pending PTSD diagnostic.

In 2019, the company received the Small Business Innovation Research (SBIR) Phase I contract through the U.S. Air Force's AFWERX Program. With this contract the company gained sponsorship of the Air Force Special Operations Command (AFSOC) 24th Special Operations Wing. Neurovation Labs received their Phase II contract in 2020.

During those same years, Neurovation Labs received funding from the U.S. Army through its xTech program.

== PTSD Authority ==
In November 2017, Neurovation Labs launched PTSD Authority, a public service website that provides information, a resource and treatment guide, and interactive forums for all those affected by PTSD.
