= Moriel Zelikowsky =

American neuroscientist

- Education: University of California, Los Angeles
- Known for: Neural circuits underlying fear and stress
- Awards: NARSAD Young Investigator Award, LOREAL for Women in Science Award, Sloan 2020 Award in Neuroscience
- Scientific career
- Workplaces: University of Utah School of Medicine
- Website: https://www.zelikowskylab.com/

Moriel Zelikowsky is a neuroscientist at University of Utah School of Medicine. Her laboratory studies the brain circuits and neural mechanisms underlying stress, fear, and social behavior. Her previous work includes fear and the hippocampus, and the role of neuropeptide Tac2 in social isolation.

== Early life and education ==
Zelikowsky was raised in Los Angeles and earned her bachelor's degree in Philosophy in 2006 from UCLA. Originally, Zelikowsky started out as a film major until she took a few metaphysics classes. After deciding she was more interested in tangible answers to questions such as "what is the brain?" or "how do we think?" that she asked during philosophy classes, she started taking neuropsychiatry classes and applied to P.h.D programs in Psychology. She joined the laboratory of Dr. Michael Fanselow at UCLA, which studies behavioral neuroscience, specifically fear learning and how fear memories are stored in the brain. Her thesis work showed that a dynamic circuit composed of the amygdala, hippocampus, and prefrontal cortex contributes to fear learning and extinction in a context-sensitive manner. Her work was published in the Journal of Neuroscience and was awarded the New York Academy of Sciences Cattell Award and the Gengerelli Distinguished Dissertation Award. She received her P.h.D in 2012.

== Career and research ==
After receiving her P.h.D, Zelikowsky worked a postdoctoral fellow in the lab of Dr. David J. Anderson in the Department of Biology and Biological Engineering at Caltech. Her work investigated how trauma and chronic stress are represented in the brain, and how neurons in these regions affect the impact of future stress on emotions and social behavior. Zelikowsky and colleagues in the Anderson lab identified a population of neuromodulators involved in stress regulation. In an interview with L'Oréal USA For Women in Science, Zelikowsky explained "The brain undergoes significant change following an intense emotional event, and these alterations in neural processing and dynamics give rise to maladaptive behaviors. It is my hope that my research will contribute to a global shift towards increased cellular precision in our approach towards the treatment of mental health disorders". A significant portion of this research focused specifically on social isolation and Tac2 and its influence on behavior. As a postdoctoral fellow, Zelikowsky was supported by multiple awards and fellowships, including the National Science Foundation, a NARSAD Young Investigator Award, a LOREAL for Women in Science Award, and a NIMH K99/R00 Pathway to Independence Award.

In the fall of 2019, Zelikowsky started her own lab at the University of Utah School of Medicine as an Assistant Professor in the Department of Neurobiology and Anatomy. Research projects in the lab include prolonged social isolation, post traumatic stress disorder, the intersection or memory and social behavior, and stress and mating. Zelikowsky was recently awarded a 2020 Sloan Research Fellowship in recognition of "creativity, leadership, and achievements in research".

In addition to her research, Zelikowsky also founded a group called Women in Learning which aims to provide a way for students and postdoctoral fellows studying learning, behavior, memory, and the broader field of neuroscience to find support and guidance on the promotion of female researchers from notable women already established in the field.

== Publications ==
The following are some of Zelikowsky's publications:

1. Zelikowsky M, Ding K, Anderson DJ. Neuropeptidergic control of an internal brain state produced by prolonged social isolation stress. Cold Spring Harb Symp Quant Biol (2019). doi: 10.1101/sqb.2018.83.038109
2. Zelikowsky M, Hui M, Karigo T, Yang B, Blanco M, Beadle K, Gradinaru V, Deverman BE, Anderson DJ. The neuropeptide Tac2 controls a distributed brain state induced by chronic social isolation stress. Cell (2018). doi: 10.1016/j.cell.2018.03.037
3. Remedios R*, Kennedy A*, Zelikowsky M, Grewe B, Schnitzer M, Anderson DJ. Social behaviour shapes hypothalamic neural ensemble representations of conspecific sex. Nature 550, 388–392 (2017). doi: 10.1038/nature23885
4. Kunwar P, Zelikowsky M, Remedios R, Cai H, Yilmaz M, Meister M, Anderson DJ. Ventromedial hypothalamic neurons control a defensive emotion state. eLife 4 (2015). doi: 10.7554/eLife.06633
5. Hong W, Kennedy A, Burgos-Artizzu XP, Zelikowsky M, Navonne SG, Perona P, Anderson DJ. Automated Measurement of Mouse Social Behaviors Using Depth Sensing, Video Tracking, and Machine Learning. Proceedings of the National Academy of Sciences 112, E5351-5360 (2015). doi: 10.1073/pnas.1515982112
6. Zelikowsky M, Chawla M, Hersman S, Barnes CA, Fanselow MS. Neuronal ensembles in amygdala, hippocampus and prefrontal cortex track differential components of contextual fear. Journal of Neuroscience 34, 8462-8466 (2014). doi: 10.1523/JNEUROSCI.3624-13.2014
7. Fanselow MS, Zelikowsky M, Perusini J, Rodriguez-Barrera V, & Hersman S. Isomorphisms between psychological processes and neural mechanisms: from stimulus elements to genetic markers of activity. Neurobiology of Learning and Memory 108, 5-13 (2014). doi: 10.1016/j.nlm.2013.10.021
8. Zelikowsky M, Bissiere S, Hast TA, Bennett RZ, Abdipranato A, Vissel B & Fanselow MS. Prefrontal microcircuit underlies contextual learning after hippocampal loss. Proceedings of the National Academy of Sciences 110, 9938-9943 (2013). doi: 10.1073/pnas.1301691110
9. Zelikowsky M, Hast TA, Bennett RZ, Merjanian M, Nocera, NA, Ponnusamy R, Fanselow MS. Cholinergic blockade frees fear extinction from its contextual dependency. Biological Psychiatry 73, 345-352 (2013). doi: 10.1016/j.biopsych.2012.08.006
10. Zelikowsky M, Bissiere S, Fanselow, MS. Contextual fear memories formed in the absence of the dorsal hippocampus decay across time. Journal of Neuroscience 32, 3393-3397 (2012). doi: 10.1523/JNEUROSCI.4339-11.2012
11. Halladay L, Zelikowsky M, Blair HT, Fanselow MS. Reinstatement of extinguished fear by an unextinguished conditional stimulus. Frontiers in Behavioral Neuroscience 6, 18 (2012). doi: 10.3389/fnbeh.2012.00018
12. Zelikowsky M, Pham, D, Fanselow, MS. Temporal factors control hippocampal contribution to fear renewal. Hippocampus 22, 1096-1106 (2012). doi: 10.1002/hipo.20954
13. Bissiere S, Zelikowsky M, Ponnusamy R, Jacobs NS, Blair HT, Fanselow MS. Electrical synapses control hippocampal contributions to fear learning and memory. Science 331, 87-91 (2011). doi: 10.1126/science.1193785
14. Krasne, F, Fanselow, MS, Zelikowsky M. Design of a neurally plausible fear learning model. Frontiers in Behavioral Neuroscience 5, 41 (2011). doi: 10.3389/fnbeh.2011.00041
15. Zelikowsky M & Fanselow MS. Conditional analgesia, negative feedback & error correction. Associative Learning and Conditioning: Human and Animal Applications (eds Schachtman TR & Reilly SS). Oxford University Press (2011). doi: 10.1093/acprof:oso/9780199735969.003.0094
16. Zelikowsky M & Fanselow MS. Opioid regulation of Pavlovian overshadowing in fear conditioning. Behavioral Neuroscience 124, 510-519 (2010). doi: 10.1037/a0020083
17. Craske MG, Kircanski K, Zelikowsky M, Mystkowski J, Chowdhury N, Baker A. Optimizing inhibitory learning during exposure therapy. Behavioral Research and Therapy 46, 5-27 (2008). doi: 10.1016/j.brat.2007.10.003

== Awards and honors ==
The following are awards and honors received by Zelikowsky:

- 2011 - American Psychological Association Fellowship
- 2012 - Gengerelli Distinguished Dissertation Award (UCLA)
- 2013 - New York Academy of Sciences Cattell Award
- 2013 - National Science Foundation Fellowship
- 2015 - NARSAD Young Investigator Award
- 2016 - LOREAL for Women in Science Award
- 2016 - NIMH K99/R00 Pathway to Independence Award
- 2020 - Sloan Research Fellowship
- 2020 - Whitehall Foundation Research Award
- 2020 - Klingenstein-Simmons Fellowship Awards in Neuroscience
