= Bolles =

Bolles is a surname. Notable people with the name include:

== Surname ==
- Charles Bolles, alias Black Bart, American outlaw
- Don Bolles, Arizona journalist murdered in 1976 after investigating the Mafia
- Don Bolles (musician), drummer for the Germs
- Enoch Bolles, American illustrator
- Garett Bolles, American football player
- Lucius Bolles, co-founder of the Newton Theological Institution in Massachusetts
- Richard "Dicky" J. Bolles (1843–1917), Florida land speculator
- Richard Nelson Bolles, author of What Color Is Your Parachute?
- Robert C. Bolles (1928–1994), psychologist
- Stephen Bolles (1866–1941), congressman from Wisconsin
- John Savage Bolles (1905–1983), San Francisco architect

== Middle name ==
Godfrey Bolles Lee

== See also ==
- Bolles baronets, list of Bolles baronets titles
- The Bolles School, a private college preparatory school in Jacksonville, Florida
- Bolles+Wilson, an architecture firm
