= Javontee Herndon =

American football player (born 1992)

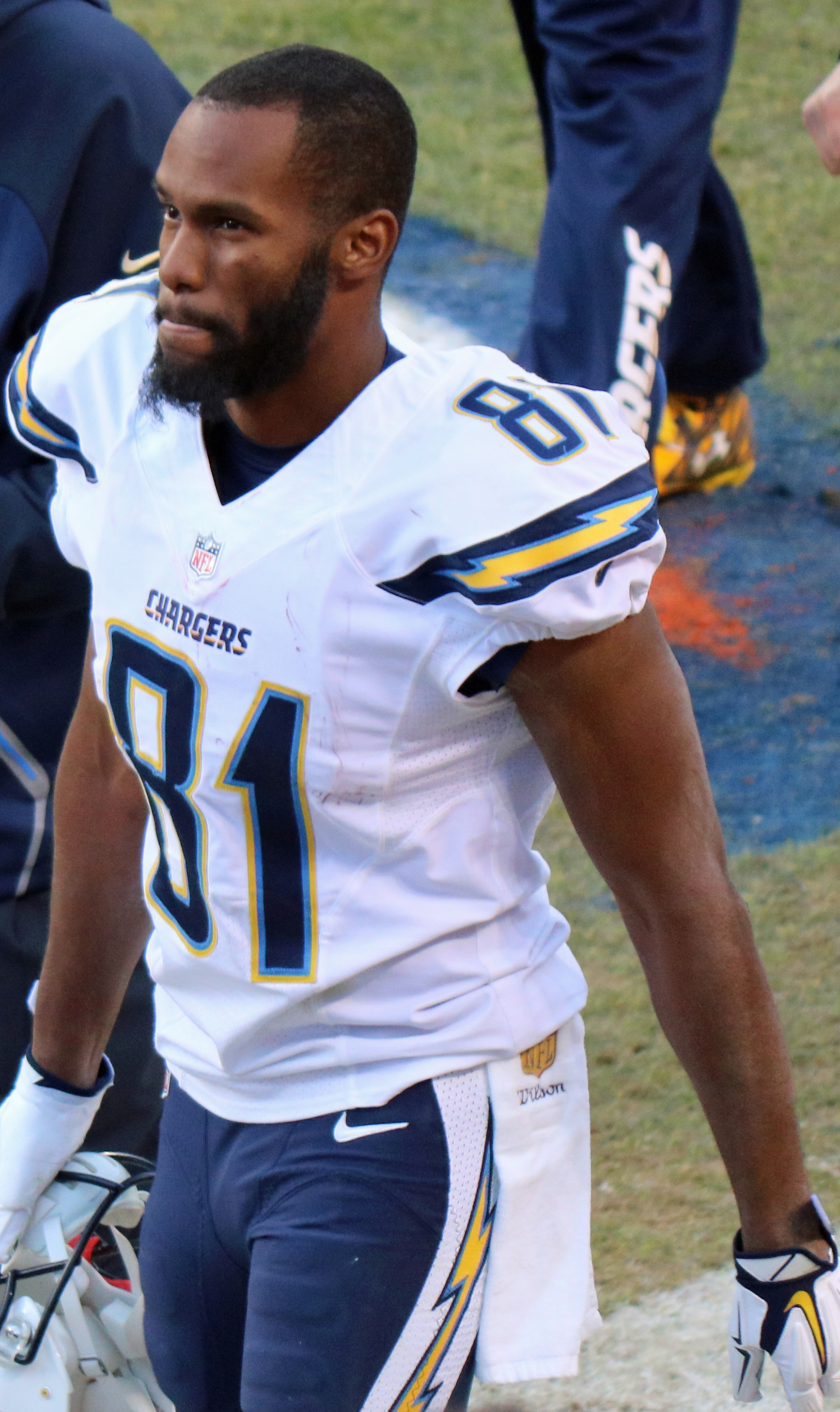
- Herndon in 2015

No. 81
- Position: Wide receiver

Personal information
- Born: June 29, 1991 (age 35); Jacksonville, Florida, U.S.
- Listed height: 6 ft 1 in (1.85 m)
- Listed weight: 194 lb (88 kg)

Career information
- High school: Jacksonville (FL) Bolles
- College: Arkansas
- NFL draft: 2014: undrafted

Career history
- San Diego Chargers (2014–2016); Dallas Cowboys (2017)*; Memphis Express (2019)*
- * Offseason or practice squad member only

Career NFL statistics
- Receptions: 24
- Receiving yards: 195
- Stats at Pro Football Reference

Javontee Herndon (born June 29, 1991) is an American former professional football player who was a wide receiver in the National Football League (NFL). He played college football at Arkansas.

== High school ==
Herndon played at Jacksonville Bolles from 2008-2011. He was a part of the back to back state championship teams.

== College career ==
Herndon attended the University of Arkansas from 2010-2013. In 2012, he appeared in every game and finished the season with 21 receptions, 304 yards and two touchdowns.

== Professional career ==
=== San Diego Chargers ===
Herndon was signed by the San Diego Chargers after going undrafted in the 2014 NFL draft. On November 3, 2015, he was added to the active roster after Keenan Allen suffered a kidney injury. On August 30, 2016, he was placed on injured reserve.

=== Dallas Cowboys ===
On July 28, 2017, Herndon signed with the Dallas Cowboys. He was waived on August 15, 2017.

=== Memphis Express ===
In 2018, Herndon signed with the Memphis Express of the Alliance of American Football for the 2019 season. However, he turned down the opportunity at the start of their training camp.
