= Sir William Monson, 4th Baronet =

English Whig politician

William Monson (ca. 1653 – 7 March 1727), of Broxbourne, Hertfordshire, was an English Whig politician who sat in the English House of Commons between 1695 and 1707 and in the British House of Commons between 1708 and 1722.

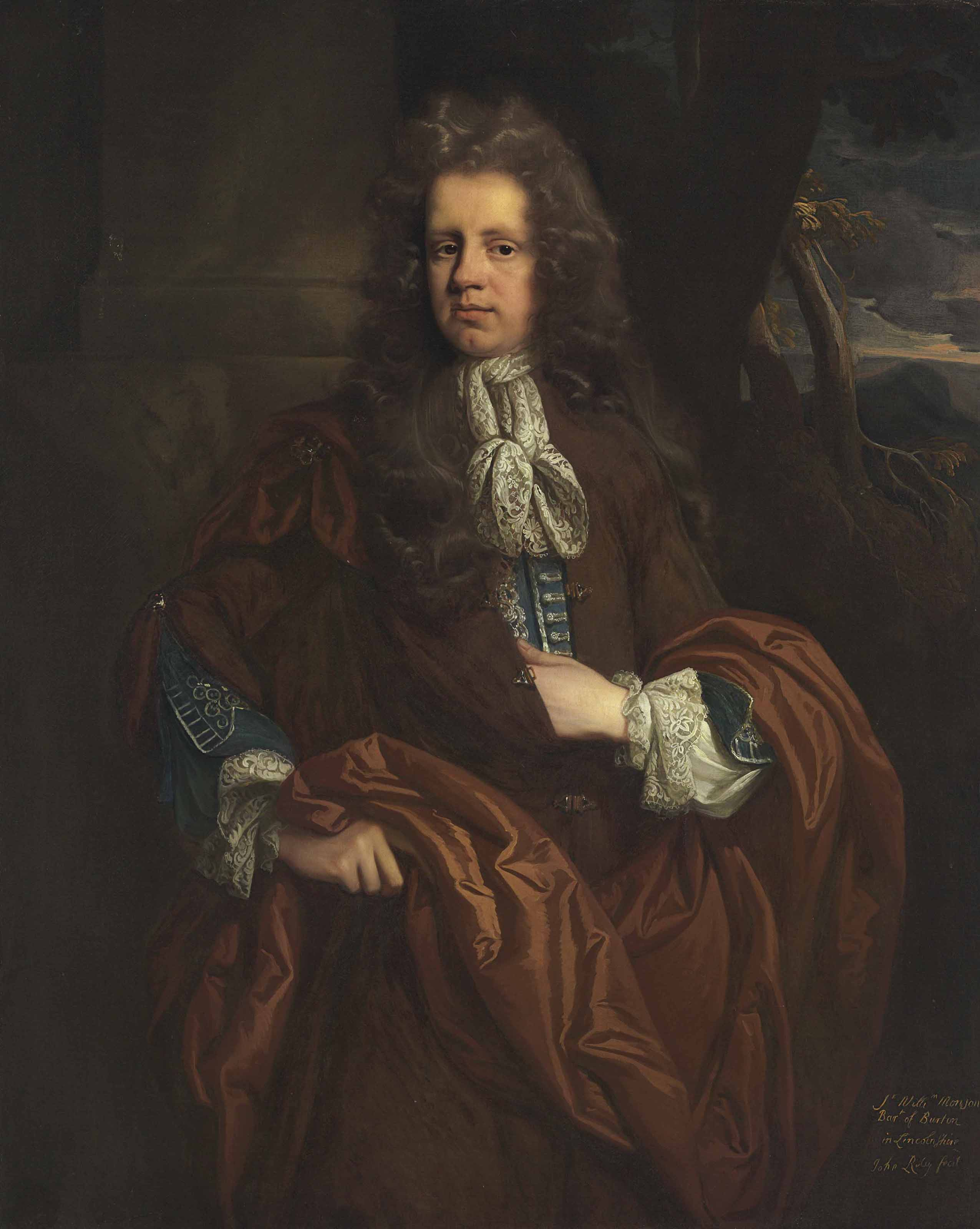
William Monson, 4th Bt (circa 1653–1727) (John Riley)

== Life ==
Monson was the second son of Sir John Monson KB, of Burton, Lincolnshire and his wife Judith Pelham, daughter of Sir Thomas Pelham, 2nd Baronet, of Halland, Laughton, Sussex. He married Laetitia Poulett daughter of John Poulett, 3rd Baron Poulett on 18 July 1688.

Monson was elected Member of Parliament (MP) for Lincoln at the general election of 1695 and sat until 1698. He was returned unopposed as MP for Heytesbury at the general elections of 1702 and 1705. He was elected as MP for Hertford in 1708 general election but was defeated there in 1710. He was returned as MP for Aldborough at a by-election on 16 April 1715. He succeeded his brother Henry in the baronetcy on 6 April 1718. He did not stand again at the 1722 general election.

Monson died without issue on 7 March 1727. His property and the baronetcy passed to his nephew, John Monson.

Parliament of England
Preceded by Sir Edward Hussey, Bt; Sir John Bolles, Bt	Member of Parliament for Lincoln; 1695–1698; With: Sir John Bolles, Bt	Succeeded by Sir Edward Hussey, Bt; Sir John Bolles, Bt
Preceded by Sir Edward Ernle; Edward Ashe	Member of Parliament for Heytesbury; 1702–1707; With: Edward Ashe	Succeeded by Parliament of Great Britain
Parliament of Great Britain
Preceded by Parliament of England	Member of Parliament for Heytesbury; 1707–1708; With: Edward Ashe	Succeeded by William Ashe; Edward Ashe
Preceded by Charles Caesar; Sir Thomas Clarke	Member of Parliament for Hertford; 1708–1710; With: Sir Thomas Clarke	Succeeded by Charles Caesar; Richard Goulston
Preceded by James Stanhope; William Jessop	Member of Parliament for Aldborough; 1715–1722; With: William Jessop	Succeeded by Charles Stanhope; William Jessop
Baronetage of England
Preceded by Henry Monson	Baronet (of Carleton); 1718–1727	Succeeded by John Monson
