= Sir Edward Hussey, 3rd Baronet =

English politician

Sir Edward Hussey, 3rd Baronet (ca. 1662 – 19 February 1725), of Caythorpe, Lincolnshire, was an English politician.

== Family ==
Hussey was the son of Sir Charles Hussey, 1st Baronet.

== Career ==
He was a Member (MP) of the Parliament of England for Lincoln on 28 May 1689, 1690, 1698, December 1701 and 1702.

Parliament of England
Preceded by Sir Henry Monson, Bt; Sir Christopher Nevile	Member of Parliament for Lincoln; 1689–1695; With: Sir Christopher Nevile 1689–1690; Sir John Bolles, Bt 1690–1695	Succeeded by William Monson; Sir John Bolles, Bt
Preceded by William Monson; Sir John Bolles, Bt	Member of Parliament for Lincoln; 1698–1701; With: Sir John Bolles, Bt	Succeeded by Sir Thomas Meres; Sir John Bolles, Bt
Preceded by Sir Thomas Meres; Sir John Bolles, Bt	Member of Parliament for Lincoln; 1701–1705; With: Sir John Bolles, Bt 1701–1702; Sir Thomas Meres 1702–1705	Succeeded by Sir Thomas Meres; Thomas Lister
Baronetage of England
Preceded by Charles Hussey	Baronet (of Caythorpe); 1680–1725	Succeeded by Henry Hussey
Preceded by Thomas Hussey	Baronet (of Honington); 1706–1725	Succeeded by Henry Hussey
