= Michael Fanselow =

American psychologist and behavioral neuroscientist

Michael S. Fanselow
- Born: Brooklyn, New York, U.S.
- Alma mater: Brooklyn College, CUNY (B.S. 1976); University of Washington (Ph.D. 1980)
- Known for: Contextual fear conditioning; predatory imminence theory; hippocampal–amygdala circuits; conditioned analgesia
- Spouse: Barbara Knowlton (m. 1995)
- Awards: APA Distinguished Scientific Contribution Award (2023); Troland Research Award (2006); D.O. Hebb Award (2006); W.H. Gantt Medal (2007)
- Scientific career
- Fields: Behavioral neuroscience, learning and behavior
- Workplaces: University of California, Los Angeles; Dartmouth College; Rensselaer Polytechnic Institute
- Thesis: (1980)
- Doctoral advisor: Robert Bolles

Michael S. Fanselow is an American psychologist, currently a Distinguished Research Professor at the University of California, Los Angeles, specializing in learning and behavior and behavioral neuroscience. He is the Staglin Family Chair and Director of the Staglin Family Music Festival Center for Brain and Behavioral Health at UCLA. His published work has been cited over 59,000 times on Google Scholar. In 2023, he received the American Psychological Association Distinguished Scientific Contribution Award, the highest honor conferred by the APA for lifetime scientific contributions. Fanselow is known for establishing contextual fear conditioning and freezing behavior as foundational experimental tools, developing the predatory imminence theory of defensive behavior, and identifying hippocampal–amygdala circuit mechanisms underlying fear learning.

== Education and early training ==
Fanselow grew up in Brooklyn, New York, where as an 8-year-old he first observed rats freezing in vacant lots. He received his B.S. in Psychology from Brooklyn College, City University of New York, in 1976. He earned his Ph.D. in Biobehavioral Psychology from the University of Washington in 1980 under the supervision of Robert Bolles. For his doctoral dissertation, he received the Edwin B. Newman Award for Excellence in Research from Psi Chi and the APA.

== Career ==
Fanselow began his academic career as Assistant Professor at Rensselaer Polytechnic Institute in Troy, New York (1980–1981). He then moved to Dartmouth College in Hanover, New Hampshire, where he served as Assistant Professor (1981–1986) and then Associate Professor (1986–1988). It was at Dartmouth that he developed the predatory imminence theory after a naturalistic field observation of a field mouse freezing under a woodpile.

In 1987, Fanselow was recruited to the Psychology Department at UCLA. He joined as the replacement for John Garcia, whom he regarded as one of his heroes in learning theory and who had been a co-graduate student with Fanselow's mentor Robert Bolles, making Garcia an academic "uncle." At UCLA he progressed through the ranks: Associate Professor (1988–1989), Professor (1989–2010), Distinguished Professor (2010–2023), and Distinguished Research Professor (2023–present). He holds the Staglin Family Chair and serves as Director of the Staglin Family Music Festival Center for Brain and Behavioral Health at UCLA. He is a member of the honorary Society of Experimental Psychologists, elected in 2007.

== Leadership and professional service ==
Fanselow served as President of the APA's Division of Behavioral Neuroscience and Comparative Psychology (Division 6) and as President of the Pavlovian Society. He received the W.H. Gantt Medal from the Pavlovian Society in 2007. He currently leads the UCLA Integrative Center for Learning and Memory and the UCLA Behavioral Testing Core, which provide infrastructure for behavioral neuroscience research.

== Research ==
=== Contextual fear conditioning and freezing behavior ===
Fanselow established contextual fear conditioning and freezing behavior as foundational tools for studying learning and memory. In this paradigm, rats receive an aversive footshock in a novel context and subsequently freeze when returned to that context, even without an explicit conditional stimulus such as a tone. He began developing this approach as a graduate student. With his first UCLA graduate student Jeansok Kim, he demonstrated that the hippocampus plays a selective and critical role in contextual fear learning, paralleling memory deficits in humans with hippocampal damage such as the famous patient H.M.

=== Predatory imminence theory ===
Fanselow developed the predatory imminence continuum, a framework describing how defensive behaviors are organized as a function of perceived threat proximity. The theory, developed with two of his graduate students, Laurie Lester and Fred Helmstetter at Dartmouth, states that the psychological distance between predator and prey is the critical determinant of defensive behavior: different defenses occur when a threat is a possibility versus when a threat has been encountered or contact is imminent. The theory has been extended to humans and clinical observations, provided the basis for the National Institute of Mental Health's negative valence Research Domain Criteria (RDoC), and offers an ethologically consistent neurobiological distinction between anxiety, fear, and panic.

=== Conditional analgesia and opioid regulation of fear learning ===
Fanselow's early work examined how fear-induced release of endogenous opioids caused an analgesia that prevented pain-related behavior from disrupting defensive behavior. He showed that this opioid response served as a negative feedback mechanism that diminished the impact of the aversive reinforcer, providing a biological mechanism for error correction in Pavlovian fear conditioning.

=== Hippocampal–amygdala circuits and NMDA-dependent plasticity ===
Inspired by a talk by Gary Lynch on NMDA receptors and long-term potentiation, Fanselow and Jeansok Kim demonstrated that NMDA receptor antagonists block the acquisition but not the expression of contextual fear conditioning. Through targeted lesion studies, they discovered that hippocampal lesions selectively mimicked the effects of NMDA blockade on contextual fear learning, while amygdala lesions blocked fear conditioning more generally. This work, conducted with Stephen Maren and others, established a model in which the hippocampus forms and consolidates a representation of the context, the amygdala associates the aversive event with that representation, and projections from the amygdala to the periaqueductal gray drive the freezing response.

=== PTSD and traumatic brain injury ===
The Fanselow lab's recent research has concentrated on how both psychological and physical brain trauma can alter amygdala function, leading to long-term enhancement of fear learning thought to contribute to posttraumatic stress disorder (PTSD). Working with Jennifer Perusini and others, he developed an animal model of fear sensitization caused by acute traumatic stress, published in Neuropsychopharmacology in 2016. He has also examined how traumatic brain injury alters fear learning and sensory processing, establishing a mechanistic link between neural disruption and PTSD-relevant phenotypes.

=== Redefining Pavlovian conditioning ===
In a 2026 paper in Neurobiology of Learning and Memory, Fanselow argued for a fundamental redefinition of Pavlovian conditioning. He proposed that Pavlovian conditioning is the process by which organisms learn to recognize biologically significant objects and generate adaptive responses via functional behavior systems organized along imminence continua, rather than the traditional view of a neutral stimulus gradually acquiring the capacity to elicit a response through repeated pairing.

== Neurovation Labs ==
Fanselow is a co-founder of Neurovation Labs, a biotech company developing treatments for PTSD, alongside Jennifer Perusini, who serves as CEO.

== Awards and honours ==
- 2023: American Psychological Association Distinguished Scientific Contribution Award, the highest honor for lifetime scientific contributions.
- 2011–2012: Distinguished Investigator Award, NARSAD (National Alliance for Research on Schizophrenia and Depression).
- 2007: W.H. Gantt Medal, Pavlovian Society.
- 2007: Elected to the Society of Experimental Psychologists, an honorary society.
- 2006: D.O. Hebb Distinguished Scientific Contribution Award, APA Division 6.
- 2006: Troland Research Award, National Academy of Sciences, "for his ingenious analysis of the mechanisms that enable stimuli to acquire the capacity to elicit fear responses."
- 1985: APA Distinguished Scientific Award for an Early Career Contribution to Psychology.
- 1983: D.O. Hebb Young Scientist Award, APA.
- Edwin B. Newman Award for Excellence in Research, for doctoral dissertation at the University of Washington.

== Selected publications ==
- Fanselow, M. S. (1979). "Naloxone attenuates rats' preference for signaled shock". Physiological Psychology. 7: 70–74.
- Fanselow, M. S. (1980). "Conditional and unconditional components of post-shock freezing in rats". Pavlovian Journal of Biological Sciences. 15: 177–182.
- Fanselow, M. S.; Lester, L. S. (1988). "A functional behavioristic approach to aversively motivated behavior: Predatory imminence as a determinant of the topography of defensive behavior". Evolution and Learning. Erlbaum.
- Kim, J. J.; DeCola, J. P.; Landeira-Fernandez, J.; Fanselow, M. S. (1991). "N-methyl-D-aspartate receptor antagonist APV blocks acquisition but not expression of fear conditioning". Behavioral Neuroscience. 105 (1): 126–133. doi:10.1037/0735-7044.105.1.126.
- Kim, J. J.; Fanselow, M. S. (1992). "Modality-specific retrograde amnesia of fear". Science. 256 (5057): 675–677.
- Maren, S.; Fanselow, M. S. (1995). "Synaptic plasticity in the basolateral amygdala induced by hippocampal formation stimulation in vivo". The Journal of Neuroscience. 15 (11): 7548–7564.
- Rau, V.; DeCola, J. P.; Fanselow, M. S. (2005). "Stress-induced enhancement of fear learning: An animal model of posttraumatic stress disorder". Neuroscience & Biobehavioral Reviews. 29 (8): 1207–1223.
- Fanselow, M. S.; Dong, H.-W. (2010). "Are the dorsal and ventral hippocampus functionally distinct structures?". Neuron. 65 (1): 7–19. doi:10.1016/j.neuron.2009.11.031. PMC 2822727.
- Perusini, J. N.; et al. (2016). "Induction and expression of fear sensitization caused by acute traumatic stress". Neuropsychopharmacology. 41 (1): 45–57. doi:10.1038/npp.2015.224.
- Fanselow, M. S.; Hoffman, A. N. (2024). "Fear, defense, and emotion: A neuroethological understanding of the negative valence research domain criteria". American Psychologist. 79 (5): 725–734.
- Fanselow, M. S. (2026). "Redefining Pavlovian conditioning". Neurobiology of Learning and Memory. 225: 108168. doi:10.1016/j.nlm.2026.108168.
