= Greystone Park Psychiatric Hospital =

- State of New Jersey; Department of Human Services
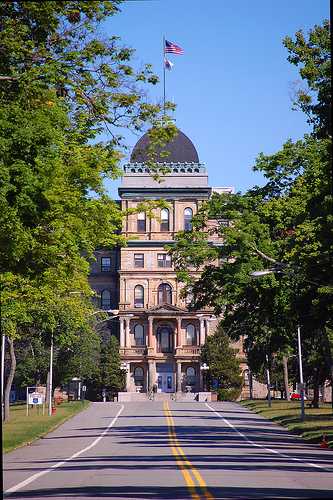
- Greystone's main entrance as seen from Central Ave in 2008.

- Location within Morris County, New Jersey

Geography
- Location: 59 Koch Ave, Morris Plains, New Jersey
- Coordinates: 40°50′5″N 74°30′19″W

Organisation
- Care system: Private
- Type: Specialist

Services
- Standards: Kirkbride Plan
- Emergency department: No
- Beds: at open: 600 at height:7,764 at close: 550
- Speciality: Psychiatric

Helipads
- Helipad: No

Links
- Building details
- Former names: State Asylum for the Insane at Morristown; New Jersey State Hospital, Morris Plains; Morris Plains State Hospital

General information
- Status: Demolished
- Type: Hospital
- Architectural style: Second Empire Victorian
- Groundbreaking: August 29, 1871
- Opened: August 17, 1876
- Closed: 2008
- Demolished: April 2015-July 2015

Technical details
- Floor count: 4
- Lifts/elevators: 1
- Grounds: 1 square mile (2.6 km^{2})

Design and construction
- Architect: Samuel Sloan
- Other designers: Thomas Kirkbride

Greystone Park Psychiatric Hospital (also known as Greystone Psychiatric Park, Greystone Psychiatric Hospital, or simply Greystone and formerly known as the State Asylum for the Insane at Morristown, New Jersey State Hospital, Morris Plains, and Morris Plains State Hospital) refers to a former psychiatric hospital and the building it occupied in Morris Plains, New Jersey. The facility was built in 1876 to alleviate overcrowding at the state's only other "lunatic asylum", in Trenton, New Jersey.

Built to accommodate 350 patients, the hospital was expanded several times, and at its peak housed more than 7,700 people in overcrowded conditions. In 2008, it was ordered to be closed as a result of deteriorating conditions and overcrowding. A new facility was built nearby on the Greystone campus. Despite considerable public opposition and media attention, demolition of the main Kirkbride building began in April 2015 and was completed by October 2015.

== History ==
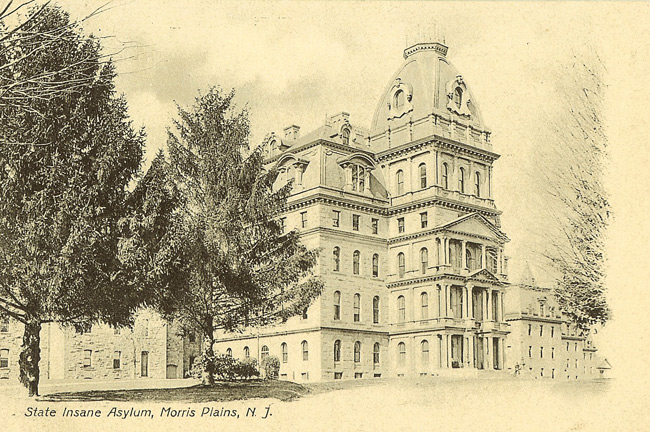
Greystone as seen in a postcard from 1923

=== Early years ===
The idea for such a facility was conceived in the early 1870s at the persistent lobbying of Dorothea Dix, a nurse who was an advocate for better health care for people with mental illnesses. At that time in history, New Jersey's state-funded mental health facilities were exceedingly overcrowded and worse than those of neighboring states that had more facilities and room to house patients. Greystone was built, all 673,700 square feet (62,590 m^{2}) of it, in part to relieve the only – and severely overcrowded – "lunatic asylum" in the state, which was located in Trenton, New Jersey. Because of her efforts, the New Jersey Legislature appropriated $2.5 million to obtain about 743 acres (301 ha) of land for New Jersey's second "lunatic asylum". Great care was taken to select a location central to the majority of New Jersey's population. After visiting about 42 locations, officials approved purchase of a portion of a few farms and lots, on August 28, 1881, near Morristown and a short distance from the Morris and Essex Railroad. The plots of land contained fertile soil, rock quarries for mining stone, a sand pit for building materials and reservoirs for water and ice access. The new asylum, when completed, would hold approximately 600 patients, with the large main building to be completed in sections as usage detailed. The plan of the main building was drafted to allow for a total of 40 wards split into two wings, one wing for each sex. There was to be no communication between wards. The corridors served a purpose other than just separating wards: they provided for fire protection, so that a fire would be unable to spread past a single section of the building. Upper floors in the center section contained apartments for employees, and the third story contained the amusement room and chapel for patients. Samuel Sloan was named architect of the main building and its smaller supporting buildings. Sloan chose to follow the Kirkbride Plan, a list of ideals pertaining to hospital design created by Thomas Story Kirkbride. There would be a center section for administrative purposes, then a wing on each side with three wards on a floor. Each ward would be set back from the previous one to allow patients to take in the beautiful grounds from their wards. Each ward was designed to accommodate 20 patients, with a dining room, exercise room and activity room. The wards were furnished with the highest quality materials such as wool rugs, pianos and fresh flowers.

Patients worked on the farms growing and raising food and performed hard labor tasks in the clearing away of building debris, excavating for roads, and sodding grounds. The plan of the institution called for carriage drives ending at all doorways, and a central road leading up to the front entrance flanked by trees on both sides. Grounds on both sides of the wings would provide for simultaneous exercise of both sexes while keeping them separate. An industrial building opened in 1894, allowing for more jobs for patients than just manual labor jobs in farming or groundworks. It was a widely popular belief that putting the insane to work in certain circumstances was beneficial both to the patient and the institution. Those who were chronically ill, restless in the day and night, were thought to be aided in their general well-being by working out some of the oversupply of blood to the brain. Within the walls of the new building, male patients were able to make brooms, rugs, brushes, carpets, and do printing and bookmaking.

By 1895, the State Lunatic Asylum was operating at 365 patients over capacity. The overcrowding was a major health and cleanliness issue, resulting in a small outbreak of typhoid fever, eventually blamed on the water supply. The passing of years brought no relief for a bursting hospital, occupied with 1,189 patients bedded down in an institution meant to hold only 800 every night. Cots were placed in activity rooms, exercise halls and hallways in order to try to find sleeping arrangements for all. "From a sanitary point of view these cots are an abomination," declared the board of managers. Cots were set up and taken down on a daily basis on the hallways, and were not able to be cleaned between uses. Patients often soiled themselves during the night, and the cots were simply handed out again the following evening.

The asylum scrambled to create more housing. By 1901, the new dormitory building was completed and quickly filled, slightly easing crowding issues. Patients were once again able to be grouped according to disease classification and had access to exercise and activity rooms again. The new dormitory building would gain infirmaries and operating rooms in the coming years, as well as a bowling alley which was extremely popular among patients and staff during the winter months when outdoor exercise was not an option. By 1903, the hospital had crossed over the 1,500-patient mark, continuing its steady climb. Once again, the numbers were an issue.

A state-of-the-art electroconvulsive therapy room was installed in the main building, and the women's wing of the dormitory received a hydrotherapy room. Medical Director Britton D. Evans described this new treatment in his report in 1961, writing, "It is well recognized that the application of water at varying degrees of temperature and pressure exerts influences of a valuable therapeutic character upon the entire human economy and aids the recuperative powers of the body." Female patients were able to receive treatment for their afflictions through use of douches, massages, and hot air cabinets. A hydrotherapeutic treatment room for male patients was opened the following year.

By 1911, the newly renamed State Asylum at Morris Plains held 2,672 patients, and cots were once again placed in corridors and activity rooms. A photographic department was established and began documenting patients in hopes of cataloging facial expressions and characteristics which go with certain mental disorders. A dental clinic opened for treatment of teeth ailments. A tuberculosis pavilion was finished and occupied the following year, as well as a new larger fire department house, and enlargements to the greenhouse and piggery. In 1916, women began participating in sewing and arts and crafts on the top floor of the Industrial Building, and a small patient library was founded with 184 volumes of books. Annexes to the Dormitory building opened in 1817 to provide more space for housing. The next few years saw much progress in the department of building construction. The Voorhees Cottage and Knight Cottage were opened as homes for nurses, as well as cottages for senior physicians and the superintendent. The Psychiatric Clinic Reception Building opened in 1923 and all operating rooms, laboratories and x-ray equipment were moved to the new building. A Social Service Department was instituted, in charge of letting patients out for "trial" visits to help them assimilate back into the real world. Parts of the hospital are set aside of "War Risk Patients" or veterans from World War I suffering from various mental diseases, including the yet-to-be-named post-traumatic stress disorder (PTSD).

The hospital was given with its modern-day name, Greystone Park Psychiatric Center, in 1924. The new reception building, dubbed the Curry Building after Medical Superintendent Marcus Curry, opened in 1928, as well as a new fire station, power plant, greenhouse, and auxiliary buildings. The Men's Occupational Therapy Building opened that same year, allowing for patients to take on new duties in service to the hospital such as tailoring and woodworking. 1929 and 1931 proved to very trying times for Greystone. In the two-year span, three fires severely handicapped the institution's ability to treat the mentally ill. The most devastating of the three fires, on November 26, 1931, was ruled to have originated from faulty electrical wiring on the sixth floor of the center section. Some patients were tied to trees with fireman's ropes to prevent escape after evacuation. The fourth floor north wards were destroyed as well as the central tower. Once rebuilt, the fourth floor in the north wards never matched the rest of the hospital in construction and style again. The state of New Jersey opened the Marlboro Psychiatric Hospital in 1931, and patients were transferred over the next few years down to the new hospital to help with overcrowding issues. However, Greystone officials were faced with a new problem: patients transferred to Marlboro had to pass a series of tests, and often the most able-bodied patients were removed from the campus, leaving older or more seriously ill patients behind. A change in the population began, and there was a shortage of patients capable of work or occupational therapy. Some of this need was filled by working men brought in by the state through the WPA program and other similar programs starting around 1935.

=== Modern era ===
==== late 20th century ====
The 1970s and 1980s saw a redirection in mental health towards deinstitutionalization. States around the country decided that mental health patients were better off living in the home with their families and being treated by the community than staying in removed surroundings in a hospital for a long-term stay. Two factors caused this sudden change. New psychological drugs were able to control patients much more effectively than previous methods ever could, and suddenly dangerous patients were capable of existing in the community in a less harmful state. Secondly, laws were passed in the 1970s forbidding patients to work unless paid fairly, which meant at least minimum wage. Suddenly hospital costs skyrocketed, as patients were no longer able to work in order to defray fees.

Due to the landmark Doe vs. Klein case in 1974, Greystone Park Psychiatric Hospital was forced to build community homes for patients to provide halfway house type living situations, and adequate staffing and patient care was required of the institution. Twenty "independent living" cottages opened in 1982 and by 1988 all patients had been moved out of living in the main Kirkbride building, and the wings were basically abandoned. Now only the center section was used for administrative purposes. Students of Drew University led an effort to try to get Greystone Park Psychiatric Center listed on the National Register of Historic Places, but were turned down. The Register claimed that the study submitted focused too much on the Kirkbride building, and that they wanted to see the entire hospital system submitted as a National Historic District. However, one student did manage to get the gas house placed on the Register.

Greystone had dark years in the 1990s. Patient escapes became commonplace, including some that involved criminals and sex offenders. Staff were accused of abuse and rape, and some female residents became pregnant. Buildings were falling apart and lacking in basic creature comforts. Greystone was in danger of losing its accreditation from the Joint Commission on Accreditation of Healthcare Organizations. If this had happened, the hospital would have lost approximately $35 million annually from Medicaid and Medicare. A Senate task force was appointed to conduct a six-month probe on how to improve conditions, and the hospital was able to pass.

The hospital is located on "Koch Avenue", named for Otto Adolf Koch. Otto Koch was a German immigrant who moved to New Jersey before WW1. He was the landscaper and won international acclaim for his florist work. In his honor, the avenue was named after him.

==== 21st century ====
In 1997, the original tuberculosis pavilion was demolished, along with the morgue, a large garage, the print and tailor shops, and several employee dormitories and cottages. A new era for Greystone had begun, and the state was realizing it did not include many of its decaying antiquated buildings. The State of New Jersey released a report in 1999 stating the behemoth Kirkbride building was "not suitable for long-term future use." The report went on to say that a new smaller building should be built and the hospital consolidated under this structure, and that while older structures should be razed, the main building should be saved due to historical significance. Governor Christine Todd Whitman ordered the now 550-bed facility closed within the next three years in 2000.

Morris County purchased approximately 300 acres (120 ha) of the Greystone Park Psychiatric Center property in 2001 for one dollar, with the stipulation that it would clean up asbestos and other environmental hazards on the site within its decaying buildings. When this land was sold, a law was also passed that Greystone land cannot be used for any purpose other than "recreation and conservation, historic preservation or farmland preservation." This meant no commercial development and no condos or townhomes.

The major effort to clean up the larger decaying buildings which still stood, and were viewed as eyesores, began in 2005 with the demolition of the dormitory.

On September 8, 2005, the New Jersey Health Care Facilities Financing Authority closed a $186,565,000 bond issue on behalf of the State of New Jersey Department of Human Services for the completion of a new, 43,000 m^{2} (460,000 sq ft) Greystone Park Psychiatric Hospital, still with a shortage of about 75 beds.

Ground was ceremonially broken on November 16, 2005, for the new psychiatric hospital on the Greystone campus, located up the hill across the street from the Ellis complex. The new hospital is two-thirds the size of the Kirkbride building and can house about 450 patients, with another 100 patients living in hospital-run cottages on the grounds around the main building.

The entire Curry Complex, including the Medical Clinic Building, the Curry Reception Building and the Employee Cafeteria came down in 2007 and 2008. The trio of buildings known as the Ellis Complex were cleared to make way for a parking lot.

On July 16, 2008, after countless unexplained delays, patients were moved into the new hospital building. Administration and other departments followed suit. Today, almost all hospital services have relocated to the new complex. Morris County has installed skating rinks and a ball field on its 300-acre share, and plans to incorporate a dog park where the Curry Complex once stood, as well as an athletic complex for disabled athletes. The Central Avenue Complex is planned to become a mall for nonprofit charitable agencies.

== The building and the Kirkbride Plan ==
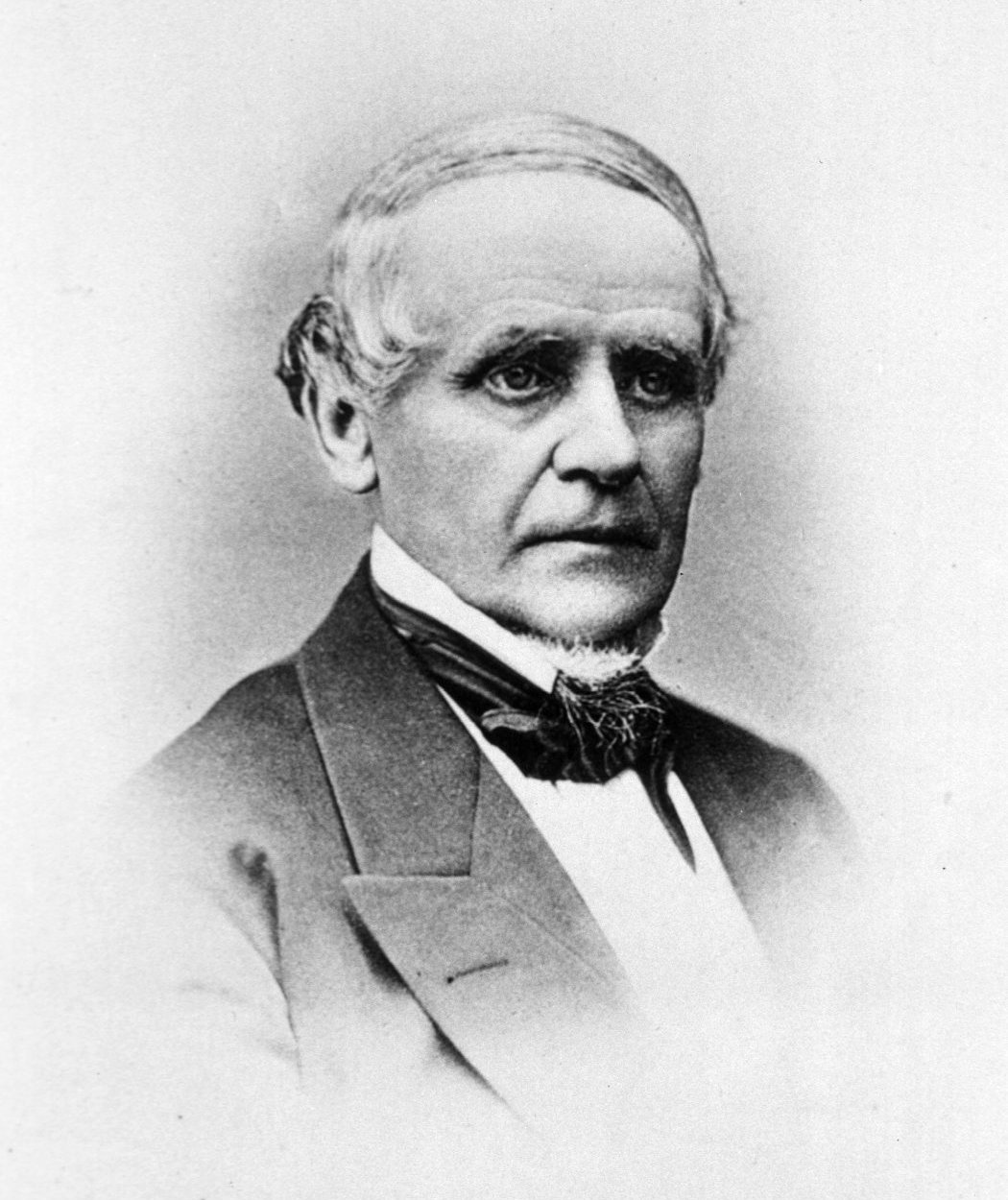
Thomas Story Kirkbride (July 31, 1809 - December 16, 1883) was a physician, advocate for the mentally ill, and founder of the AMSAII, a precursor to the American Psychiatric Association.

The original Second Empire Victorian style building was 673,700 square feet (62,590 m^{2}). At the base of this building was the alleged largest continuous foundation in the United States from the time it was built until it was surpassed by the Pentagon when it was constructed in 1943. However, many other Kirkbride asylum buildings (such as the Athens Lunatic Asylum in Ohio) also lay a claim to this fame and it has not been verified which one is true. The building has a characteristic linear arrangement, which was designed to the specifications of the Kirkbride Plan. The main building has a center section that was used for administrative purposes with three wings radiating out from the center, each about 140 feet (43 m) long. They were set back from the previous one so that patients could enjoy the beauty of the outside surroundings. This was a central concept, along with moral treatment, that was the hallmark of the Kirkbride Plan for treating the mentally ill. The building form itself was meant to promote treatment and have a curative effect.

Each ward was initially set up to accommodate 20 patients. Each was furnished with a dining room, exercise room, and parlor. Most wards had wool rugs that ran the full length of the corridors. Other amenities included Victorian stuffed furniture, pianos, pictures, curtains and fresh flowers. Though not all wards were created equally. Wards that housed the most excitable patients were sparsely furnished – presumably for their own safety – with sturdy oak furniture.

=== Thomas Story Kirkbride's philosophy ===
During the time that Greystone was built, the predominant philosophy in psychology was that the mentally ill could be cured or treated, but only if they were in an environment designed to deal with them. A major proponent of this philosophy was Thomas Story Kirkbride, who participated in the design phase of the main building at Greystone, though the two main designers were architect Samuel Sloan and Trenton State Asylum Superintendent Horace Buttolph (a friend of Kirkbride's). The building was constructed and furnished according to Kirkbride's philosophy, which proposed housing no more than 250 patients in a three-story building. The rooms were to be light and airy with only two patients to a room. To reduce the likelihood of fires, Greystone and other Kirkbride asylums were constructed using stone, brick, slate and iron, using as little wood as possible. A street on the Greystone Park campus bears Buttolph's name.

The Greystone campus itself was once a self-contained community that included staff housing, a post office, fire and police stations, a working farm, and vocational and recreational facilities. It also had its own gas and water utilities and a gneiss quarry, which was the source of the Greystone building material. Below the building, a series of tunnels and rails connect the many sections.

=== Fate of the historic buildings ===
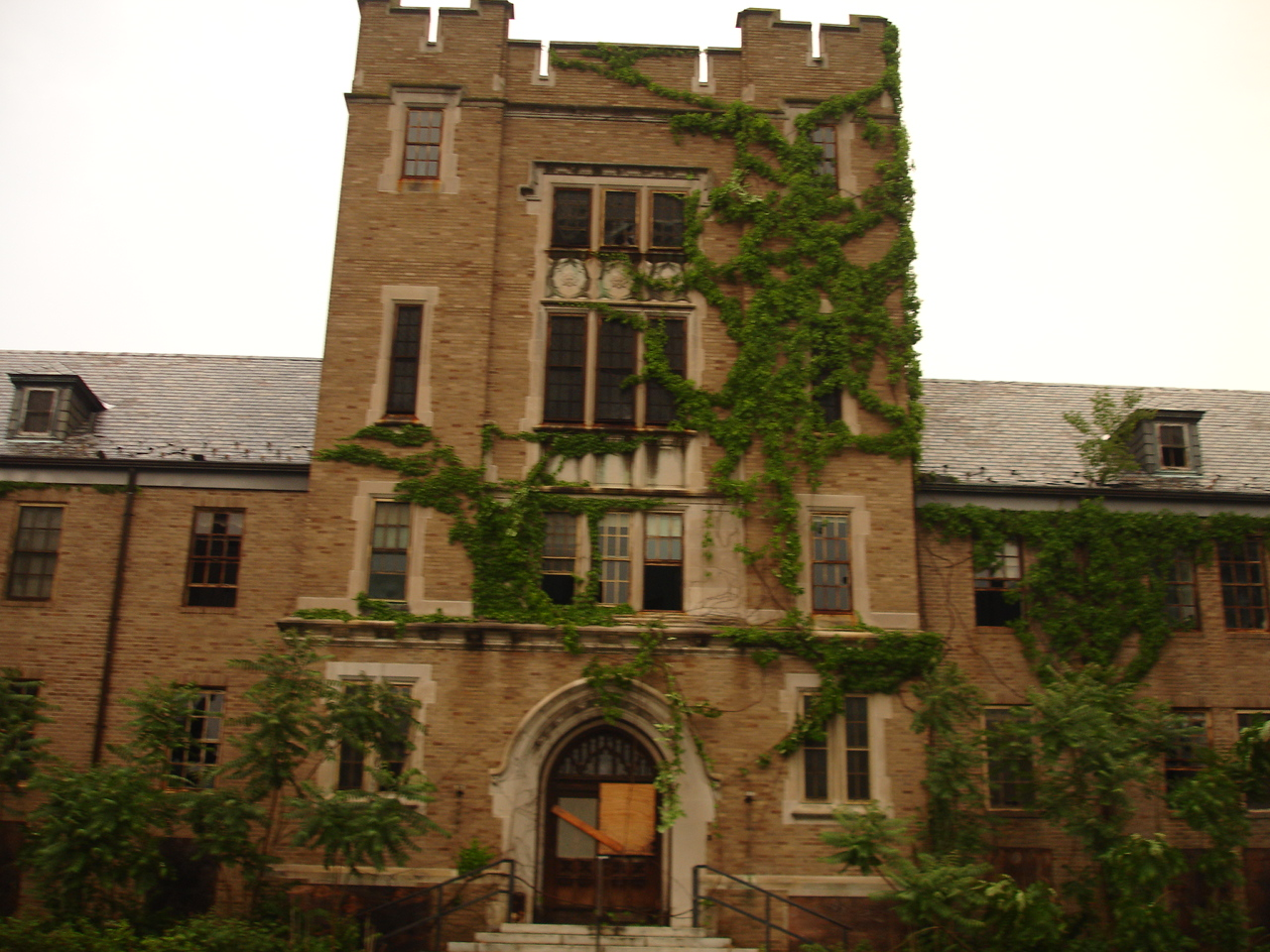
The Curry Building as it appeared in 2006. The building was demolished in 2008 after an inspection deemed it irreparable.

By the 2000s, many of the buildings were vacant and needed major repairs. Preservationists had been working for several years to guarantee the survival of this complex of buildings and Morris County had been negotiating with the State of New Jersey to take over vacant structures for non-profit agencies. Citizens of Morris County and surrounding areas formed the Preserve Greystone society to save the buildings.

After the transition of the hospital's activity to its new location, the remaining property, including the historic Kirkbride building, was turned over to the state's treasurer in October 2007 as excess property with the intention that it would be sold. In the summer of 2008, the Curry building, as well as the surrounding vacant buildings, were demolished.

In August 2013, state officials from the New Jersey Department of the Treasury announced plans to demolish the main Kirkbride building. In response to the community preservation group, Preserve Greystone, the Department worked with a consultant who found that redevelopment of the building would be too costly. The following year the state announced the awarding of a $34.4 million demolition bid to Northstar Contracting Group to take down the Kirkbride Building as well as other structures of the old hospital. Governor Chris Christie announced that the state was not considering a bid by Alma Realty to restore the property at no cost to the state. The plans for the demolition included the designation of an area on the property to memorialize the Kirkbride Building. State officials announced the demolition was scheduled to begin on April 6, 2015 and that work to clean up the site had already begun. Preserve Greystone filed an appeal to halt the demolition which the state court declined to hear.

Despite considerable public opposition and open protest and media attention, the main Kirkbride building was demolished in a process that began in April 2015 and was completed by October 2015. However, some items of the stunning architectural details (manifesting unique Victorian motifs) and other items with symbolic and historic value were rescued from the Greystone main building prior to its controversial demolition.

== Notable patients ==
- Enoch Bolles (1883-1976) Pin-up artist. Suffered mental breakdown due to over work and malnutrition.
- Harrison W. Noel (1906-1977) Double murderer.
- Naomi Ginsberg (1894-1956) Mother of Allen Ginsberg and subject of his poem, Kaddish.
- Woody Guthrie (1912-1967) Not committed, but remained there due to Huntington's disease from 1956 to 1961.
- Charles Cullen (1960–present) Serial killer also known as "The Good Nurse", who is responsible for the deaths of anywhere from dozens to hundreds of patients over several decades and multiple hospitals he was employed at. He was treated at Greystone in 1993 after multiple suicide attempts and breaking into the home of a fellow nurse he was stalking after creating a fantasy that they were in a relationship.

== Popular culture ==
The Kirkbride building has been used as a filming location for multiple shows and films, including Marvin's Room as well as "Mayfield Psychiatric Hospital" in two episodes of the FOX series House, M.D..

== See also ==
- List of hospitals in New Jersey
- Greystone Park by Images of America
- Kirkbride Plan
- Thomas Story Kirkbride
- Greystone Park Psychiatric Hospital rises in drone video, as presented in the official YouTube channel of NJ.com
