= Thomas Meres =

English lawyer and Tory politician (1634–1715)

Sir Thomas Meres (1634 – 9 July 1715), of Lincoln and Bloomsbury, Middlesex, was an English lawyer and Tory politician who sat in the English and British House of Commons between 1659 and 1710. He showed a remarkable level of activity both within and outside Parliament, particularly during the reign of Charles II.

== Early life ==
Meres was baptised on 17 September 1634, the eldest son of Robert Meres, DD, of Kirton, Lincolnshire, chancellor of Lincoln Cathedral, and his first wife Elizabeth Williams, daughter of Hugh Williams of Wegg, Caernarvonshire who was the widow of William Dolben, DD, prebendary of Lincoln. He was thus the half-brother of John Dolben, Archbishop of York, and Sir William Dolben, a judge. He was educated at Carre's Grammar School in Sleaford, Lincolnshire, under Mr Gibson and was admitted at Sidney Sussex College, Cambridge on 23 January 1651 aged 15. He was admitted to Inner Temple in 1652 and in the same year succeeded to his father's property. He married Anne de la Fountaine, daughter of Sir Erasmus de la Fountaine of Kirby Bellars, Leicestershire in January 1658.

== Career ==
In 1659, Meres was chosen as Member of Parliament for Lincoln in the Third Protectorate Parliament. In January 1660, he was appointed Commissioner for assessment for Lincolnshire, and in March 1690 Commissioner for militia for Lincolnshire and Justice of the Peace for Lindsay and for Holland. He was returned unopposed as MP for Lincoln at the 1660 English general election for the Convention Parliament. He was knighted on 11 June 1660 and was also called to the bar in 1660. In July 1660 he became Justice of the Peace for Kesteven and in August a Commissioner for sewers for Hatfield chase and a Commissioner for assessment for Lindsey and Lincoln. He was appointed Commissioner for maimed soldiers in September 1660. In 1661 he was re-elected MP for Lincoln. In the 18 years of the Cavalier Parliament he made over 500 speeches and served on 686 committees. He produced over 100 reports and acted as teller 35 times.

Outside Parliament, Meres was Commissioner for oyer and terminer at Lincoln 1661, and Commissioner for assessment for Lincolnshire from 1661 to 1663. From 1662 to 1663 he was a Commissioner for corporations and in 1663 a Commissioner for loyal and indigent officers for Lincolnshire, Commissioner for complaints for the Bedford level and Commissioner for assessment for Lindsey and Lincoln to 1664, and for Westminster until 1680. He was Commissioner for assessment for Lincolnshire from 1664 to 1680, and a Commissioner for enclosures for Deeping fen in 1665. In 1670 he became Deputy lieutenant for Lincolnshire and in 1671 a Commissioner for concealments. In Parliament he was chairman of the committee of elections and privileges from 8 February 1673 to 30 December 1678. He was a Commissioner for recusants in 1675 and an assistant to the Sons of the Clergy in 1678.

Meres was re-elected MP for Lincoln at the first general election of 1679 and was chairman of the committee of elections and privileges from 19 March to 27 May 1679. He was returned again at the second general election of 1679. He was a Lord of the Admiralty from 1679 to 1684 and a Commissioner for assessment for Essex, Leicestershire and London from 1679 to 1680. By 1680 he was a captain in the foot militia. He was returned in a contest as MP for Lincoln at the 1681 English general election and also became a Justice of the Peace for Holland in 1681. He was unopposed at the 1685 English general election. He lost his position as Deputy Lieutenant and on the Commissions of the Peace in 1688 after the Test Acts.

After the Glorious Revolution, in October 1688, Meres was restored to the Commission of the Peace as JP for Lindsey and Kesteven and was Commissioner for assessment for Lincolnshire in 1689. By 1689 he had lost his support at Lincoln and did not stand for the Parliaments in that year. He was restored as deputy lieutenant for Lincolnshire in 1691 and was appointed a Commissioner for rebuilding St Paul's in 1692. He stood for Lincoln at the 1695 English general election and at the 1698 English general election but was unsuccessful on both occasions. In 1696 he was vice-president of the Sons of the Clergy. He was appointed a Commissioner for collecting subscriptions to the land bank in 1699.

Meres was eventually returned as MP for Lincoln in a contest at the first general election of 1701 but did not stand at the second election of that year. He was returned for Lincoln in a contest at the 1702 English general election. At the 1705 English general election, he was returned for Lincoln unopposed and voted against the Court candidate for Speaker on 25 October 1705. He was named to two drafting committees and spoke frequently in debates on the Regency bill. He was returned unopposed as a Tory for Lincoln at the 1708 British general election. He made little contribution in Parliament, but voted against the impeachment of Dr Sacheverell in 1710. At the 1710 British general election he was defeated and did not stand for Parliament again. He was involved in a scandal in 1711 as one of the commissioners for rebuilding St Paul's, who were accused of awarding a contract on a corrupt basis to Richard Jones against the wishes of Sir Christopher Wren.

== Death and legacy ==
Meres died at his home in London on 9 July 1715 and was buried at Kirby Bellars, Leicestershire. He and his wife had three sons Thomas, John and William and three daughters. He disinherited his son Thomas and was thus succeeded by his second son John. .

Parliament of England
Preceded by Humphrey Walcot; Original Peart	Member of Parliament for Lincoln; 1659–1689; With: Robert Marshal 1659; John Monson 1660; Sir Robert Bolles, Bt 1661–1664; Sir John Monson 1664–1675; Henry Monson 1675–1681; Sir Thomas Hussey, Bt 1681–1685; Henry Monson 1685–1689	Succeeded by Henry Monson; Sir Christopher Nevile
Preceded by Sir Edward Hussey, Bt; Sir Robert Bolles, Bt	Member of Parliament for Lincoln; 1701; With: Sir Robert Bolles, Bt	Succeeded by Sir Edward Hussey, Bt; Sir Robert Bolles, Bt
Preceded by Sir Edward Hussey, Bt; Sir Robert Bolles, Bt	Member of Parliament for Lincoln; 1702–1707; With: Sir Edward Hussey, Bt 1701–1705; Thomas Lister 1705–1707	Succeeded by Parliament of Great Britain
Parliament of Great Britain
Preceded by Parliament of England	Member of Parliament for Lincoln; 1707–1710; With: Thomas Lister	Succeeded by Thomas Lister; Richard Grantham
