= Harrison W. Noel =

American murderer

Harrison W. Noel (16 April 1905 - June 1977), murdered cab driver Raymond Pearce and six-year-old Mary Daly in an apparent copycat kidnapping in early September 1925. He was condemned to death but the sentence was upended on appeal by using insanity defense. Noel was committed to an institution and died in Trenton, New Jersey in 1977.

== Early life ==
Noel was born in Manhattan, New York City, on April 16, 1905, and moved five years later to Montclair, New Jersey, where he was living with his mother and stepfather at the time of the murder case. He exhibited signs of a mental disorder while in college and spent time in Overbrook Hospital for the Insane in Cedar Grove, New Jersey.

== Evidence and criminal charges ==
=== Raymond Pearce ===
Raymond Pearce, an African-American cab driver, was last seen near the Montclair railroad station on the afternoon of 3 September 1925. His body was discovered by a passerby along the roadway near the Peckham river in Cedar Grove two days later. Pearce had been shot in the back of the head with a .32 caliber steel-jacketed bullet. His cab was found in the woods in Cedar Grove later that day. Noel's vehicle happened to have been spotted in Cedar Grove near a stone quarry on 4 September and reported to the police by the wife of the local chief of police. Noel was apprehended and taken to police headquarters. In a search of Noel's home, police discovered a variety of the weed Beggar's lice, which could be commonly found in the woods where Pearce's cab was abandoned. Also found was a box of .32 caliber ammunition and a receipt for a Spanish automatic pistol purchased from a sporting goods store in New York and shipped to an address in Little Falls, New Jersey. The Little Falls postmaster identified Noel as having received a package of a size and shape appropriate for the delivery of the pistol only days after the purchase date on the receipt. The pistol was found in Pearce's recovered vehicle. Blood stains were found in the vehicle and on clothes found in Noel's home.

=== John Sandin ===
John Sandin, a chauffeur, followed Noel's vehicle on 4 September after a commotion in front of the Montclair where he was polishing his vehicle. Witnesses pointed Sandin towards Noel's vehicle and a chase ensued. When Sandin pulled up next to the vehicle, Noel shot him in the head and seriously wounded him. Sandin reported that Noel had a young girl in the vehicle.

=== Mary Daly ===
Noel kidnapped Mary Daly, a six-year-old girl, from in front of her Montclair home on 4 September, with the intent to collect a $4,000 ransom. Inexplicably, Noel shot her in the head and killed her and left her body in a back roads area of Little Falls. Noel led the police to the body and provided a written statement.

Noel claimed to have been inspired to commit the kidnapping by the 1924 trial of Leopold and Loeb, who were famously defended by Clarence Darrow.

== Legal process ==
Noel was charged with two counts of murder in the first degree. A strong insanity defense was waged. He was tried in the Essex oyer and terminer and found guilty with no recommendation from the jury to commute the sentence to life imprisonment. He was sentenced to death in the electric chair.

William A. Wachenfeld, his lawyer, obtained a writ of error from Chancellor Walker, which stayed the execution, pending an appeal hearing. The appeal court, the Court of Errors and Appeals, found Noel insane.

Noel was committed to the Greystone Park Psychiatric Center in Morris County, New Jersey.

== Trial Aftermath ==
Public opinion blamed Noel's father and the director of the mental institution for having him released, thereby allowing Noel to commit his crimes. There was also strong public sentiment against insanity pleas.
