= Sir Robert Bolles, 2nd Baronet =

English politician

Sir Robert Bolles, 2nd Baronet (1619 – 3 August 1663) was an English politician who sat in the House of Commons from 1661 to 1663.

Bolles was the son of Sir John Bolles, 1st Baronet of Scampton, Lincolnshire and his wife Katharine Conters, daughter of Thomas Conters, of Brodham, Lincolnshire and of East Barnet, Hertfordshire. He was baptised at Scampton on 11 April 1619. He supported the King in the Civil War and was fined £1,500 in January 1646. He succeeded to the baronetcy on 9 March 1648.

After the Restoration in 1661, he was one of the Grand Jury for trying the Regicides. He was elected Member of Parliament for Lincoln in 1661 for the Cavalier Parliament and sat until his death in 1663. He was a generous patron of the fine arts and literature.

Bolles died at the age of 44, and was buried by torchlight at St Swithin's, London.

Bolles married Mary Hussey, daughter of Sir Edward Hussey, 1st Baronet and his wife Elizabeth Anton, daughter of George Anton at Honington, Lincolnshire on 14 October 1637.

Parliament of England
Preceded by John Monson; Sir Thomas Meres	Member of Parliament for Lincoln; 1661–1663; With: Sir Thomas Meres	Succeeded by Sir John Monson; Sir Thomas Meres
Baronetage of England
Preceded by John Bolles	Baronet (of Scampton); 1648–1663	Succeeded by John Bolles
