= Enoch Bolles =

American pin-up painter

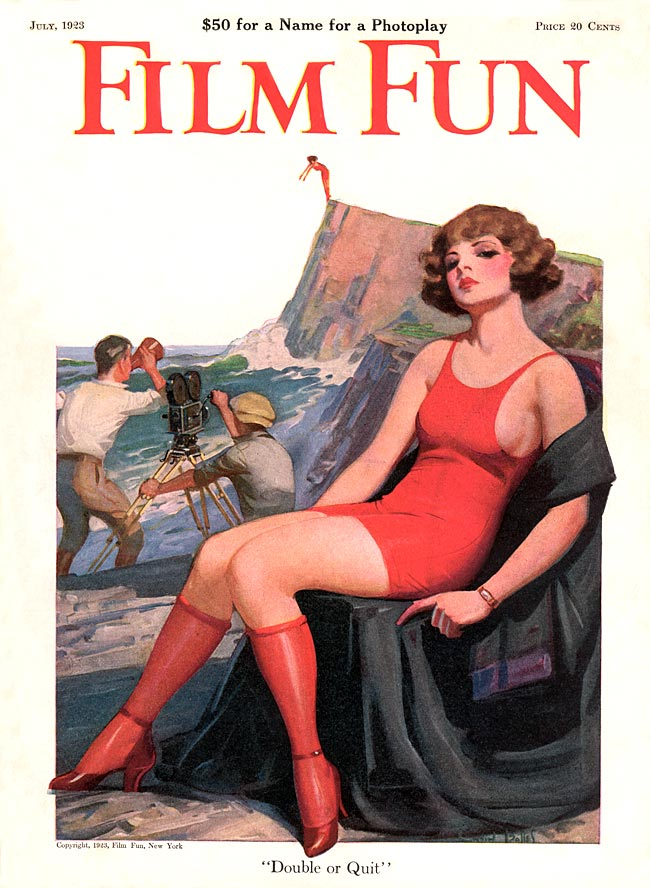
One of Bolles' covers for the Film Fun magazine (1923)

Enoch Bolles (3 March 1883 – 16 March 1976) was an American painter of pin-up art. He was among the earliest and most widely circulated glamour illustrators. While known today solely as a pinup artist, Bolles was a versatile illustrator who also worked extensively in the advertising industry, creating hundreds of attractive color illustrations for products ranging from bread to cigarettes. His most widely reproduced advertising illustration is the "Windy Girl" for Zippo lighters. This work, produced in 1937, has recently been reissued as the Vargas Windy Girl and has appeared in well over 100 variations on Zippo lighters.

== Biography ==
Bolles was born in Boardman, Marion County, Florida, the son of Enoch Bolles, Jr., a chemist in the perfume industry, and Catherine Keep. After his father's death, the family moved to Newark, New Jersey, where he met and, in 1903, married Clara Kaufman. They had eight children together, eventually settling in Harrington, New Jersey.

Bolles studied at the National Academy of Design, and his first illustrations were published in 1914 on the covers of humor magazines, such as Judge and Puck. He became best known for illustrating Film Fun. In 1923 he became the exclusive cover artist for the pulp magazine Film Fun and continued in this role until the magazine folded in 1943, a victim of the Postmaster General's campaign against 'salacious' material. In addition to his 200 covers for Film Fun, Bolles painted at least 300 more for spicy pulps, including Breezy Stories, Pep and New York Nights. None of this work was signed and most of it remains unattributed. Bolles' monthly lineup of all-American beauties precisely posed in wildly imaginative costumes did much to define the future of American pin-up illustration, and remain popular today. He was also a versatile illustrator who created advertising for many products, including Sun-Maid Raisins and Zippo lighters.

Psychological problems ended Bolles' professional career in 1943 and confined him to Greystone Park Psychiatric Hospital in New Jersey for most of the rest of his life, but he continued to paint commissioned portraits and for personal pleasure. He was eventually discharged from hospital in 1969, and died from heart failure at the age of 93.

== Bibliography ==
- The Great American Pin-Up, by Charles G. Martignette and Louis K. Meisel, ISBN 3-8228-1701-5
- "Beauty by Design: The Art of Enoch Bolles", by Jack Raglin, Illustration Magazine (#9), 2004
- "The Art Stars of Film Fun", by Jack Raglin, Illustration Magazine (# 14), 2005.
