= Kyōko Nakano =

Kyōko Nakano (Japanese: 中野京子) is a Japanese scholar of German literature, Western cultural historian, and translator.

Nakano grew up in Hokkaido, Japan, and completed her master's degree at Waseda University in Shinjuku, Tokyo. In 2007, she published Scary Pictures, that would be the first of a series of art books on the theme of fear in painting (kowai-e). Volumes 2, 3, 4 and 5 were published in 2008, 2009, 2016 and 2017, respectively, and the best-selling series led to an exhibition in 2017 and a stage adaptation in 2022.
