= John Monson =

English politician

John Monson (c.1628 – 14 October 1674) was an English politician who sat in the House of Commons in two periods between 1660 and 1674.

Monson was the son of Sir John Monson, 2nd Baronet of South Carlton and Broxbourne, Hertfordshire and his wife Ursula Oxenbridge, daughter of Sir Robert Oxenbridge of Hurstbourne Priors, Hampshire. He was a commissioner for militia for Lincolnshire in March 1660. In April 1660, he was elected Member of Parliament for Lincoln in the Convention Parliament. He was a commissioner for oyer and terminer on the Midland circuit in July 1660 and a J.P. for Lindsey and Kesteven, Lincolnshire from July 1660 until his death. In August 1660 he was commissioner for sewers for Hatfield chase and Lincolnshire and was commissioner for assessment for Lindsey and Lincoln from August 1660 to 1661. He was created Knight of the Bath on 23 April 1661. At the general election of 1661, he lost his seat to Sir Robert Bolles. He was commissioner for assessment for Lincolnshire from 1661 to 1663, commissioner for corporations for Lincolnshire from 1662 to 1663 and commissioner for assessment for Lindsey from 1663 to 1664. In 1664 in a by-election following the death of Bolles, he was elected MP for Lincoln for Cavalier Parliament. He was Deputy Lieutenant for Lincolnshire and commissioner for assessment for Lincolnshire from 1664 until his death. In 1671 he became Deputy Lieutenant for Hertfordshire and was commissioner for assessment for Hertfordshire from 1673.

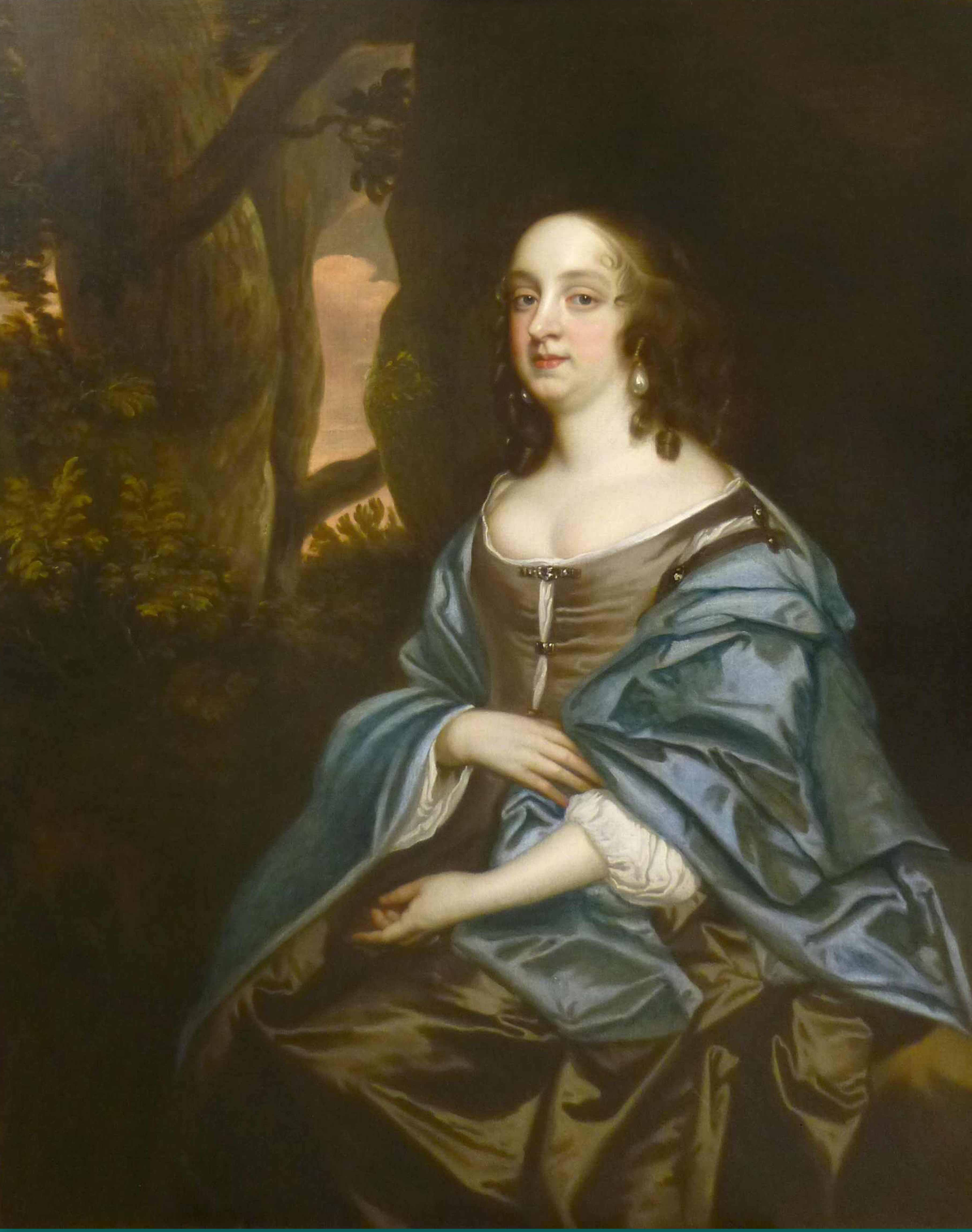
Judith Pelham, later Lady Monson

Monson died at the age of 46 and was buried at South Carlton. He was remembered as "a gentleman of a brisk humour, a ready wit, clear parts, quick apprehension, good elocution, an excellent temper, great prudence, free from partiality, admired by the gentry, and in all things well accomplished for business".

Monson married Judith Pelham daughter of Sir Thomas Pelham, 2nd Baronet of Halland, Laughton, Sussex on 7 June 1647. They had ten sons and a daughter. His wife died on 21 December 1700.

Parliament of England
Preceded by Thomas Lister	Member of Parliament for Lincoln; 1660; With: Sir Thomas Meres	Succeeded by Sir Robert Bolles; Sir Thomas Meres
Preceded by Sir Robert Bolles; Sir Thomas Meres	Member of Parliament for Lincoln; 1664–1674; With: Sir Thomas Meres	Succeeded by Henry Monson; Sir Thomas Meres
