= Freezing behavior =

Reaction to specific stumuli

Freezing behavior, also called the freeze response or being petrified, is a reaction to specific stimuli, found in humans and commonly observed in prey animals. When a prey animal has been caught and completely overcome by the predator, it may respond by "freezing up/petrification" or in other words by uncontrollably becoming rigid or limp. Studies typically assess a conditioned freezing behavior response to stimuli that typically or innately do not cause fear, such as a tone or shock. Freezing behavior is most easily characterized by changes in blood pressure and lengths of time in crouching position, but it also is known to cause changes such as shortness of breath, increased heart rate, sweating, or choking sensation. However, since it is difficult to measure these sympathetic responses to fear stimuli, studies are typically confined to simple crouching times. A response to stimuli typically is said to be a "fight or flight", but is more completely described as "fight, flight, or freeze". In addition, freezing is observed to occur before or after a fight or flight response.

== Physiology ==
Studies suggest that specific areas of the brain are known to either elicit or inhibit (in the case of lesions) freezing behavior in subjects. The regions include the basolateral amygdala and the hippocampus.

One such study, conducted by Ann E. Power et al., investigated the effects of lesions in the basolateral amygdala. Rats were placed in a chamber containing cat hair. Two groups of rats were tested: rats that had been lesioned in the basolateral amygdala and rats that were the control group (which were sham-operated). All rats at first froze briefly then retreated away from the stimulus upon initial contact. The results showed that the lesioned rats froze much less to the cat hair than the rats of the control group. These data imply a connection between the basolateral amygdala and freezing behavior.

Another study, conducted by Gisquet-Verrier et al., tested the effects of the hippocampus, in three experiments, on both the freezing behavior and avoidance. The rats were lesioned with ibotenic acid, and were tested against a control group. They first investigated changes from conditioned fear, and results showed that lesions to the hippocampus did not alter freezing behavior and marginally affected avoidance. Next, they tested single conditioning sessions, and it was found that freezing behavior remained unchanged while avoidance was disrupted. Finally, they tested conditioning with a larger stimulus (footshock intensity). It was found that avoidance was unaltered while freezing behavior decreased. Not only did these investigations show that the hippocampus is involved with freezing behavior, but avoidance and freezing behavior do not seem to have similar ways of being quantified when it comes to fear conditioning.

== Neurotransmitters ==
It has been experimentally tested that particular areas of the brain are involved with freezing behavior. As mentioned before, Ann E. Power investigated the effect of basolateral amygdala on freezing behavior. It was also found that muscarinic cholinergic activation plays a role in the behavior. That suggests that neurotransmitters, in general, play a role in freezing behavior. Several investigations show that freezing behavior is influenced by the following:

- Serotonin
- GABA
- Oxytocin
- Dopamine
- Epinephrine
- Cortisol
- Antipsychotic drugs
- Methamphetamine
- Monoamine oxidase inhibitors

Hashimoto et al. investigated the effects of conditioned fear on serotonin and freezing behavior in rats. Through in vivo microdialysis, certain concentrations of extracellular serotonin in the rat brain were able to be measured. It was found that conditioned fear stress increased the levels of the serotonin in the medial prefrontal cortex. This increase was correlated with an increased freezing behavior that was observed. The rats were then given an inhibitor for the extracellular serotonin, which resulted in a reduced freezing behavior. It can be suggested from these results that inhibition of serotonin can decrease freezing behavior and, also, anxiety.

Methamphetamine has also been shown to potentially affect freezing behavior. Tsuchiya et al. conducted a study investigating the effect of methamphetamine pretreatment on freezing behavior. Rats were given the drug over a week, ramping up the doses. After that, there was a five-day period without any drugs administered. The rats were then subjected to conditioned fear stress. Repeated but not single methamphetamine pretreatment resulted in a significantly increased freezing behavior. This evidence suggests that previous exposure to chronic methamphetamine results in an increased sensitivity to subsequent stress than a control group.

Just as neurotransmitters influence freezing behavior, inhibitors, as expected, interrupt neurotransmitters and influence freezing behavior. This study examined the effects of monoamine oxidase inhibitors on freezing behavior. Rats were treated with specific inhibitors that target either monoamine oxidase A or B. The results showed that acute inhibition of both monoamine oxidase A and B reduce anxiety or freezing behavior. However, inhibition of monoamine oxidase A or B alone failed to do so.

== Hormones ==
It has been shown that parts of the brain are involved in freezing behavior and that neurotransmitters and similar chemicals influence freezing behavior, as well. In a related manner, hormones, progestogens and estrogen, also play a role in freezing behavior. First, the authors tested the rats in marble burying and conditioned fear when they were in behavioral estrous or diestrous. Female rats in behavioral estrous have elevated levels of these steroid hormones and also elicit more approach and less freezing behavior than diestrous rats. Results demonstrate that rats in this behavioral estrous show less impulsive burying and also less freezing behavior than diestrous rats. The authors then administered progesterone and estrogen in ovariectomized rats and tested them in marble burying and conditioned fear. The results for this experiment demonstrate that administration of progesterone or both estrogen and progesterone decreases impulsive burying. Both demonstrate a decrease in freezing behavior. The study concludes that "progesterone and/or estrogen may mediate impulsive and/or avoidant behavior." Freezing behavior in a female's cycle is seen to be greatly impacted by levels of hormones. However, there may be future studies on whether testosterone influences freezing behavior as well.

== See also ==
- Apparent death
