= Bolles baronets =

Extinct baronetcy in the Baronetage of England

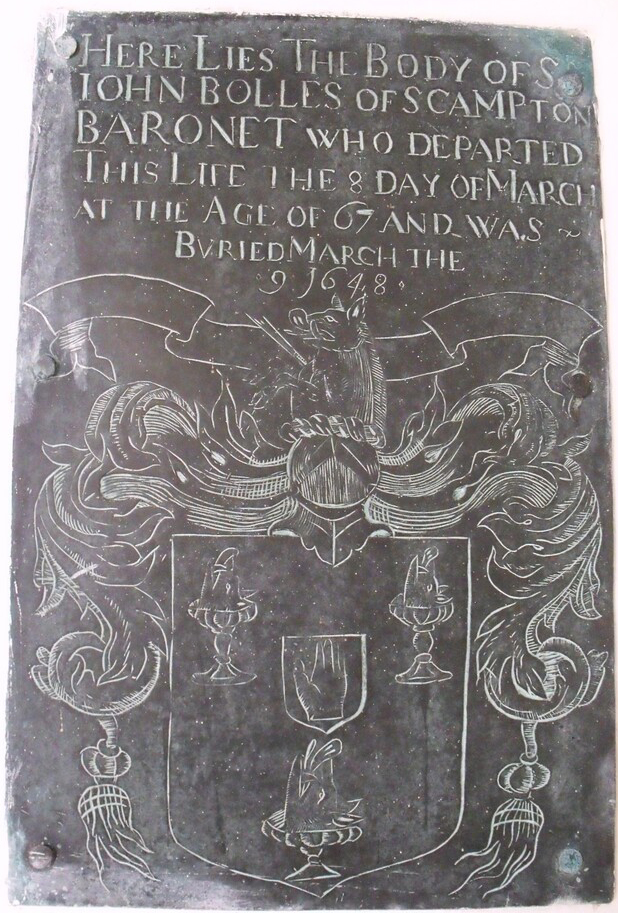
Brass wall plaque of Sir John Bolles, 1st Baronet with his Coat of Arms, St John the Baptist Church, Scampton, Lincolnshire

There have been two baronetcies created people named Bolles, one in the Baronetage of England and one in the Baronetage of Nova Scotia.

The Bolles baronetcy, of Scampton in the County of Lincolnshire, was a title in the Baronetage of England. It was created on 24 July 1628 for John Bolles, son of Sir George Bolles, Lord Mayor of London and High Sheriff of Lincolnshire in 1627. The second Baronet was Member of Parliament for Lincoln from 1661 to 1663. The fourth Baronet followed his example from 1690 to 1702. The title became extinct on the latter's death in 1714.

The Bolles (later Jopson) baronetcy, of Osberton in the County of Nottingham, was a title in the Baronetage of Nova Scotia. It was created on 19 December 1628 for Mary Bolles, born Mary Wytham. She married first Thomas Jopson, of Cudworth in the County of York, and second, as his second wife, Thomas Bolles, of Osberton, who died in 1635. This is the only instance of a baronetcy being created for a woman. On the death of her grandson from her first marriage, the baronetcy became dormant.

== Bolles baronets, of Scampton (1628) ==
- Sir John Bolles, 1st Baronet (c. 1580 – 1648)
- Sir Robert Bolles, 2nd Baronet (1619–1663)
- Sir John Bolles, 3rd Baronet (1641–1686)
- Sir John Bolles, 4th Baronet (1669–1714)

== Bolles (later Jopson) baronets, of Osberton (1628) ==
- Dame Mary Bolles, 1st Baronetess (1579–1662)
- Sir William Jopson, 2nd Baronet (c. 1635 – c. 1670)
