= Christopher Nevile =

English Member of Parliament

Sir Christopher Nevile (c. 1631 – 18 November 1692), of Haddington, Aubourn, Lincolnshire, was an English Member of Parliament.

He was the eldest son of Sir Gervase Nevile of Haddington and Katherine Hutton, daughter of Sir Richard Hutton of Goldsborough Hall. He was educated at Sidney Sussex College, Cambridge (1650) and Gray's Inn (1653). He succeeded his father in 1654 and was knighted 15 December 1674.

He was a justice of the peace for Kesteven from 1675 until his death and was appointed High Sheriff of Lincolnshire for 1680–81. He was a member (MP) of the parliament of England for Lincoln in 1689.

He married twice: firstly Katherine, the daughter of Thomas Estoft of Eastoft, Yorkshire, with whom he had a son and secondly Katherine, the daughter of Sir Arthur Ingram of Temple Newsam, Yorkshire. His son predeceased him.
