= Robert C. Bolles =

American psychologist

Robert Charles Bolles (April 24, 1928 – April 8, 1994) was an American psychologist and author who conducted work on experimental psychology. He developed the species-specific defense reaction theory which contends that many avoidance behaviors are actually elicited behaviors rather than operant behaviors.

He graduated from Wesleyan University and earned a PhD in experimental psychology from University of California, Berkeley.
