= Richard Jones =

Richard Jones may refer to:

== Arts and entertainment ==
- F. Richard Jones (1893–1930), American filmmaker
- Dick Clair (Richard Jones, 1931–1988), American producer, actor and TV writer
- Richard Jones (The Feeling) (born 1979), British bass guitarist
- Richard Jones (composer) (died 1744), violinist and composer
- Richard Jones (actor) (1779–1851), English actor and dramatist
- Richard Jones (director) (born 1953), British opera director
- Richard Jones (Stereophonics) (born 1974), Welsh bass guitarist
- Richard M. Jones (1892–1945), American jazz musician
- Richard T. Jones (born 1972), American actor
- Richard Tyrone Jones (born 1980), performance poet, writer and comedian
- Richard Jones (photojournalist), British photojournalist
- Richard Jones (poet), American poet
- Dick Jones (actor) (1927–2014), American actor
- Richard Jones (magician) (born 1990), talent show winner
- Dick Jones, senior vice president of OCP in the movie RoboCop
- Richard Jones, fictional character in Babel
- Richard Jones (Neighbours), fictional character in the Australian soap opera Neighbours

== Sportsmen ==
- Richard Jones (cricketer, born 1857) (1857–1935), English lawyer and a cricketer
- Richard Owen Jones (1867–1936), Bangor F.C. and Wales international footballer
- Richard Jones (cricketer, born 1871) (1871–1940), English cricketer
- Richard Jones (footballer, born 1875) (1875–?), Leicester Fosse F.C. and Wales international footballer
- Richard Jones (footballer, born 1878) (1878–1938), Druids F.C. and Wales international footballer
- Richard Jones (footballer, born 1879) (1879–?), Millwall Athletic F.C., Manchester City F.C. and Wales international footballer
- Dick Jones (Australian footballer) (1926–2013), Australian rules footballer
- Dick Jones (rugby union, born 1878) (1878–1958), Welsh international rugby union footballer
- Dick Jones (rugby union, born 1906) (1906–1986), Welsh international rugby union player
- Dick Jones (rugby, born 1920), Welsh rugby union and rugby league footballer
- Dickie Jones (footballer, born 1874), English footballer
- Dicky Jones (footballer, born 1901), English footballer
- Richard Jones (footballer, born 1969), Welsh footballer with Hereford United F.C., Barry Town F.C. and others
- Richard Jones (chess player) (born 1983), Welsh chess player
- Richard Jones (New Zealand cricketer) (born 1973), New Zealand cricketer
- Richard Jones (cricketer, born 1916) (1916–2004), English cricketer
- Richard Jones (cricketer, born 1986), English cricketer (Worcestershire)
- Richard Jones (racing driver) (born 1949), British former racing driver
- Ritchie Jones (born 1986), English footballer
- Dick Jones (baseball) (1902–1994), American baseball player
- Richard Jones (sprinter) (born 1973), Guyanese Olympic sprinter
- Richard Jones (Trinidadian runner) (born 1976), Trinidadian distance runner and competitor at the 2007 IAAF World Road Running Championships
- Richard Jones (New Zealand runner) (born 1973), New Zealand middle-distance runner and national record holder
- Itch Jones (Richard Jones, 1938–2025), college baseball coach

== Diplomats, lawyers and politicians ==
=== Politicians from NSW, Australia ===
- Richard Jones (1786–1852) or Richard Jones Snr, father of Richard Jones Jnr, member of the NSW Legislative Council (1856–1860)
- Richard Jones (New South Wales politician, born 1843) (1843–1909), or Richard Jones Jnr, son of Richard Jones Snr, member of the NSW Legislative Council (1899–1909)
- Richard Jones (1816–1892), member of the Legislative Assembly (1843–1848) and Colonial Treasurer (1857–1858)
- Richard Jones (New South Wales politician, born 1940), member of the NSW Legislative Council (1988–2003)

=== Other diplomats, lawyers and politicians ===
- Richard Jones (burgess), 1691-1758, planter and one of first burgesses representing Amelia County in the Virginia colony
- Richard Jones, Welsh MP for Carmarthenshire from 1555 to 1959
- Richard Jones (Tasmanian politician) (1936–1986), co-founder of the United Tasmania Group (UTG), the world's first Green party
- Richard Jones (U.S. diplomat) (born 1950), American diplomat
- Richard Lee Jones (1893–1975), American Ambassador to Liberia
- Richard Jones (British diplomat) (born 1962), former British Ambassador to Albania
- Richard Jones, 1st Earl of Ranelagh (1641–1712), Irish nobleman and politician
- Richard Jones (died 1729), Irish MP for Donegal Borough
- Richard Jones (died 1736), British MP for Marlborough and Salisbury
- Richard Jones (died 1790), Irish MP for Killybegs and Newtown Limavady
- Richard A. Jones (born 1950), U.S. federal judge
- Dick Jones (Wyoming politician) (1910–2008)
- Dick Jones (Kansas politician) (1942–2024), American politician
- Richard Jones (MP for Radnor) (1578–16??), Welsh politician who sat in the House of Commons between 1628 and 1640

== Other occupations ==
- Richard Jones (priest, born 1603) (1603–1655/6), Welsh priest and writer
- Richard Jones (bishop) (died 1953), Welsh Anglican bishop
- Richard Jones (doctor), Australian medical doctor
- Richard Jones (East India Company officer) (1754–1835), Bombay Army general
- Richard Jones (economist) (1790–1855), English economist
- Richard Jones (Ruthin priest) (c. 1757–1814), Welsh priest and writer
- Richard A. Jones (physicist) (born 1961), professor of physics at the University of Manchester
- Richard Bathoe Jones (1830–1916), Anglican priest in Ireland
- Richard Basil Brandram Jones (1897–1916), English soldier and recipient of the Victoria Cross
- Richard D. P. Jones, English musicologist
- Richard Foster Jones (1886–1965), American classical scholar
- Richard Lloyd Jones (1873–1963), editor and publisher of the Tulsa Tribune
- Richard R. Jones (1853–1921), American Baptist minister
- Richard Stanton-Jones (1926–1991), English aeronautical engineer
- Richard Victor Jones (1929–2019), American physicist and professor
- Richard W. Jones (1904–1987), biomedical engineer and authority on physiological control systems
- Richard Wyn Jones (born 1966), Welsh academic at Cardiff University
- Richard Jones, the real name of computer hacker Electron
- Richard Jones, a pen-name of Theodore Hook (1788–1841)

== Other uses ==
- Richard Jones (department store), a department store in Chester, England

== See also ==
- Rich Jones (disambiguation)
- Rick Jones (disambiguation)
- Ricky Jones (disambiguation)
