= William Monson (British Army officer) =

British Army officer and politician

Colonel The Honourable William Monson
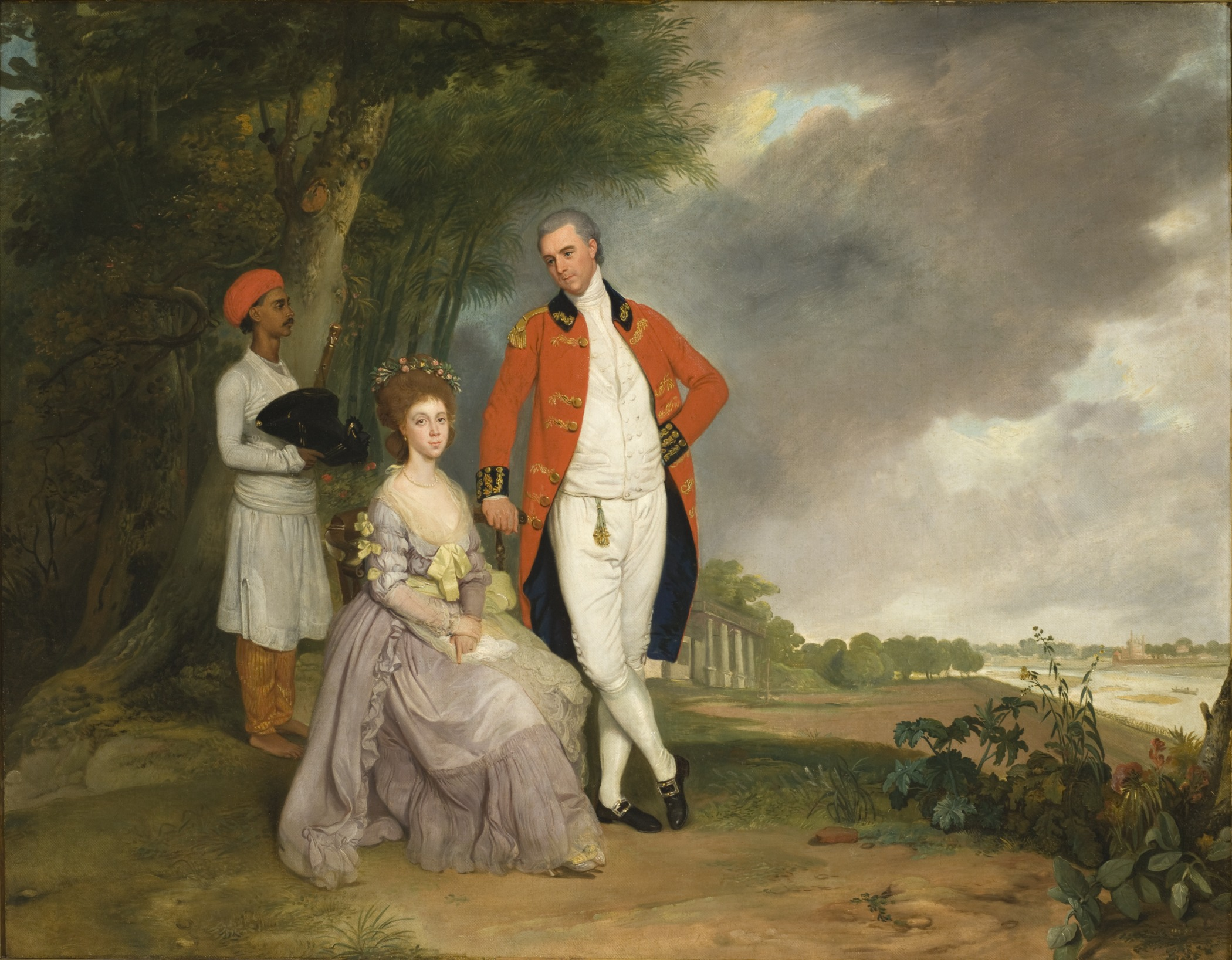
- Monson with his wife Anne, c. 1786, by Arthur William Devis
- Born: 15 December 1760; London
- Died: 26 December 1807 (aged 47); Bath, Somerset
- Alma mater: Eton College; Harrow School
- Spouse: Anne Debonnaire (m. 1786)
- Children: William Monson, 6th Baron Monson
- Relatives: John Monson, 2nd Baron Monson (father)
- Military career
- Allegiance: United Kingdom
- Branch: British Army
- Service years: 1777–1807
- Rank: Colonel
- Conflicts: Third Anglo-Mysore War; Siege of Seringapatam; Second Anglo-Maratha War; Siege of Aligarh (WIA); Battle of Mukandwara Pass; Siege of Deeg; Battle of Deeg; Siege of Bharatpur

Member of Parliament for Lincoln
- In office 1806 – 26 December 1807 Serving with Richard Ellison
- Preceded by: Humphrey Sibthorp & Richard Ellison
- Succeeded by: John Savile & Richard Ellison

Personal details
- Party: Whigs

Colonel William Monson (15 December 1760 – 26 December 1807) was a career British Army officer and the member of parliament for Lincoln from 1806 to 26 December 1807.

Monson, the son of John Monson, 2nd Baron Monson, served almost all of his military career in the East Indies. He fought in India during the Third Anglo-Mysore War, seeing action at the Siege of Seringapatam, and then served as a senior officer during the Second Anglo-Maratha War. Commanding the 1st Infantry Brigade, he was severely wounded in the successful Siege of Aligarh, but then suffered an egregious defeat while in command of a force of sepoys at the Battle of Mukandwara Pass. He saw further service at the Siege of Deeg and Siege of Bharatpur before returning to Britain in 1806.

Monson, supported by William Fitzwilliam, 4th Earl Fitzwilliam, was elected as member of parliament for Lincoln at the 1806 United Kingdom general election. A Whig, he was mostly unable to attend parliament because of an illness. Despite this he was re-elected unopposed at the 1807 United Kingdom general election, but died in office having not attended parliament again.

== Early life ==
William Monson was born in London on 15 December 1760, the fourth son of John Monson, 2nd Baron Monson and Theodosia née Maddison. His brothers were John Monson, 3rd Baron Monson, Charles Monson, and George Monson. Monson was educated at Eton College from 1769 to 1774, and then Harrow School until 1775.

== Military career ==
=== Early career ===
Monson joined the British Army on 22 May 1777 as an ensign in the 12th Regiment of Foot. His military service was almost entirely confined to the East Indies, where he was based from 1780. He was promoted to captain in the same year, joining the 14th Regiment of Foot. The Third Anglo-Mysore War began in 1790, and in 1792 Monson played a prominent role in the Siege of Seringapatam. Commanding the light company of the 52nd Regiment of Foot, on 22 February he captured the southern entrenchment surrounding the city.

Despite Monson's successes, Lord Cornwallis, the Commander-in-Chief, India, did not support him; Cornwallis declined to make him his aide de camp and vetoed a request from Nizam Ali Khan, Asaf Jah II, Nizam of Hyderabad, for Monson to lead his army.

Promoted to brevet major on 1 March 1794, Monson transferred to hold the rank substantively in the 52nd on 2 September 1795. Still in the East Indies, he was promoted to lieutenant-colonel in the 76th Regiment of Foot, a regiment recently arrived in the sub-continent, on 21 December 1797.

=== Senior command ===
The new Commander-in-Chief, India, Gerard Lake, appointed Monson to command the 1st Infantry Brigade in 1803 for the Second Anglo-Maratha War. Invading northern India, Monson led the attack at the successful Siege of Aligarh on 4 September; in doing so he received a severe wound which left him incapacitated for six months.

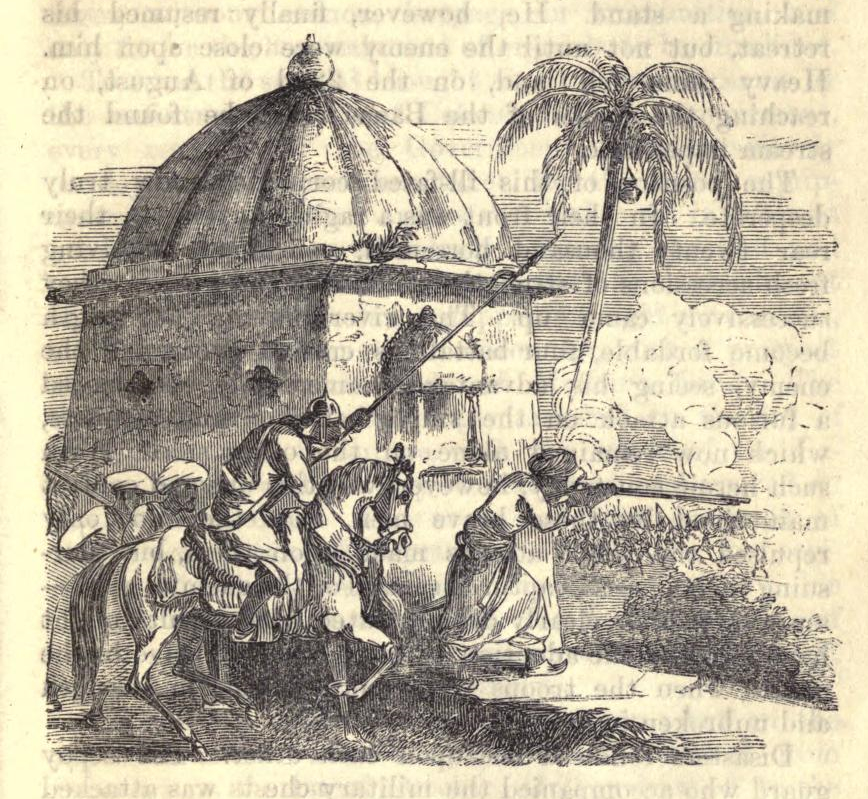
Marathas attack Monson's force during the Battle of Mukandwara Pass

In April 1804 Lake sent Monson in command of a force of around 4,000 sepoys to reconnoitre the positions of Yashwantrao Holkar around Jaipur. The force arrived on 21 April and Monson commenced a poorly considered advance on Holkar, who put Monson to flight in the disastrous Battle of Mukandwara Pass, also known as Monson's Retreat. Only several hundred of Monson's original 4,000 survived.

While Monson was overwhelmingly at fault for the result at Mukandwara, Lake had also made mistakes in providing him with too small a force and not reacting to the start of the retreat. Lake therefore continued to support Monson, appointing him second-in-command to Major-General John Fraser for the final operations against Holkar.

Monson was promoted to brevet colonel and created an aide de camp to George III on 1 January 1805. Undertaking the Siege of Deeg, during the Battle of Deeg on 14 November Fraser was mortally wounded and Monson took command of the campaign. In February 1806 the Siege of Bharatpur was going on unsuccessfully, with three failed assaults. Lake assigned Monson to command the fourth and final attack on the fortress on 21 February, which also failed.

With the Second-Anglo Maratha War having ended, Monson returned to Britain. He had no further active military service.

== Political career ==
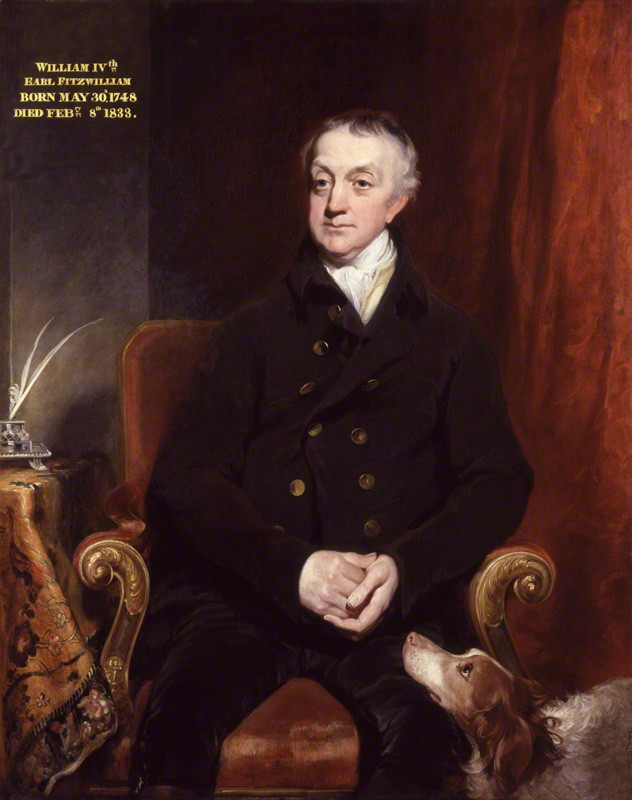
Monson's political career was supported by William Fitzwilliam, 4th Earl Fitzwilliam

Having returned from India, Monson proposed to the head of his family, now his nephew Frederick Monson, 5th Baron Monson, that their old interest in the parliamentary constituency of Lincoln be re-established. This request was refused, but Monson went ahead putting him forward for candidacy with the support of William Fitzwilliam, 4th Earl Fitzwilliam. FitzWilliam, a Whig.

Monson subsequently won Lincoln at the 1806 United Kingdom general election in October. Deemed a supporter of the new government of William Grenville, 1st Baron Grenville, and wishing to demonstrate such, on 5 January 1807 Monson was requested to attend parliament but responded that "at present it is utterly impossible for me from my very ill state of health, to remove from my nephew’s Lord Monson’s where I am at present". He was granted a month of ill-health leave on 19 March, but was present to vote in parliament on 9 April.

Monson was re-elected unopposed a month later at the 1807 United Kingdom general election, having assured his constituents that he was opposed to Roman Catholic relief bills. He was still battling his illness, and was because of this unable to attend parliament after the election. He died in Bath, Somerset, on 26 December. In the wake of this, money was provided to his family through the proceeds of the sale of a company in the 2nd Ceylon Regiment.

== Personal life ==
Monson married Anne Debonnaire, the daughter of Calcutta and Lisbon merchant John Debonnaire, in Calcutta on 10 January 1786. They had one son, William Monson, 6th Baron Monson, who succeeded to the barony upon the death of Monson's nephew Frederick. Anne survived Monson, dying on 24 February 1841.

== Citations ==
Parliament of the United Kingdom
Preceded by Humphrey Sibthorp; Richard Ellison	Member of Parliament for Lincoln; 1806–1807; With: Richard Ellison	Succeeded by John Savile; Richard Ellison
