= Baron Monson =

Barony in the Peerage of Great Britain

- Or two chevronels gules
- Creation date: May 25, 1728; 298 years ago
- Created by: King George II
- Peerage: Peerage of Great Britain
- First holder: Sir John Monson, 5th Baronet
- Present holder: Nicholas Monson, 12th Baron Monson
- Heir presumptive: Hon. Andrew Monson
- Motto: Prest pour mon pais ("Ready for my country")

Baron Monson (pronounced Munson), of Burton in the County of Lincoln, is a title in the Peerage of Great Britain. It was created in 18th century for Sir John Monson, 5th Baronet. The Monson family descends from Thomas Monson, of Carleton, Lincolnshire. He sat as Member of Parliament for Lincolnshire, Castle Rising and Cricklade. On 29 June 1611 he was created a Baronet, of Carleton in the County of Lincoln, in the Baronetage of England. His eldest son, the second Baronet, fought as a Royalist during the Civil War and also represented Lincoln in the House of Commons.

He married Ursula Oxenbridge, daughter of Sir Robert Oxenbridge of Hurstbourne in Hampshire, through which marriage the manor of Broxbourne came into the Monson family. This was to be the seat of the family for many years. His eldest son, the third Baronet, also represented Lincoln in Parliament. He died childless and was succeeded by his younger brother, the fourth Baronet. He sat as a Member of Parliament for Lincoln, Heytesbury, Hertford and for Aldborough.

His son, the fifth Baronet, represented Lincoln in Parliament. In 1728 he was raised to the Peerage of Great Britain as Baron Monson, of Burton in the County of Lincoln. He later served as President of the Board of Trade. Lord Monson married Lady Margaret, youngest daughter of Lewis Watson, 1st Earl of Rockingham. Their second son the Hon. Lewis Monson succeeded to the Watson estates on the death of his cousin Thomas Watson, 3rd Earl of Rockingham, assumed the surname of Watson in lieu of Monson and was created Baron Sondes in 1760 (his great-grandson was created Earl Sondes in 1880; see this title for more information on this branch of the family). Lord Monson was succeeded by his eldest son, the second Baron. He declined the offer of an earldom in 1766.

His great-great-grandson, the seventh Baron, was a Liberal politician. In 1886, he was created Viscount Oxenbridge, of Burton in the County of Lincoln, in the Peerage of the United Kingdom. However, this title became extinct on his death in 1889, while the barony and baronetcy passed to his brother, the eighth Baron. He held several court positions. His great-grandson, the eleventh Baron, was a civil liberties campaigner and president of the Society for Individual Freedom who sat in the House of Lords as a crossbencher. He was one of the 90 elected hereditary peers who remained in the House after the passing of the House of Lords Act 1999. Since 2011, the titles are held by his son Nicolas. The heir presumptive is the present holder's younger brother, Hon. Andrew Anthony John Monson (born 1959).

Several other members of the Monson family have gained distinction. Sir William Monson, younger brother of the first Baronet, was an admiral in the Royal Navy. Sir William Monson, second son of the first Baronet, was created Viscount Monson in the Peerage of Ireland in 1628. However, he was a member of the court which tried King Charles I and was deprived of his honours and sentenced to imprisonment for life in 1661. Also, Sir Edmund Monson, younger brother of the first Viscount Oxenbridge and the eighth Baron, was a noted diplomat and served as British Ambassador to France from 1896 to 1904. In 1905 he was created a Baronet in his own right (see Monson baronets for more information).

== Monson baronets, of Carleton (1611) ==
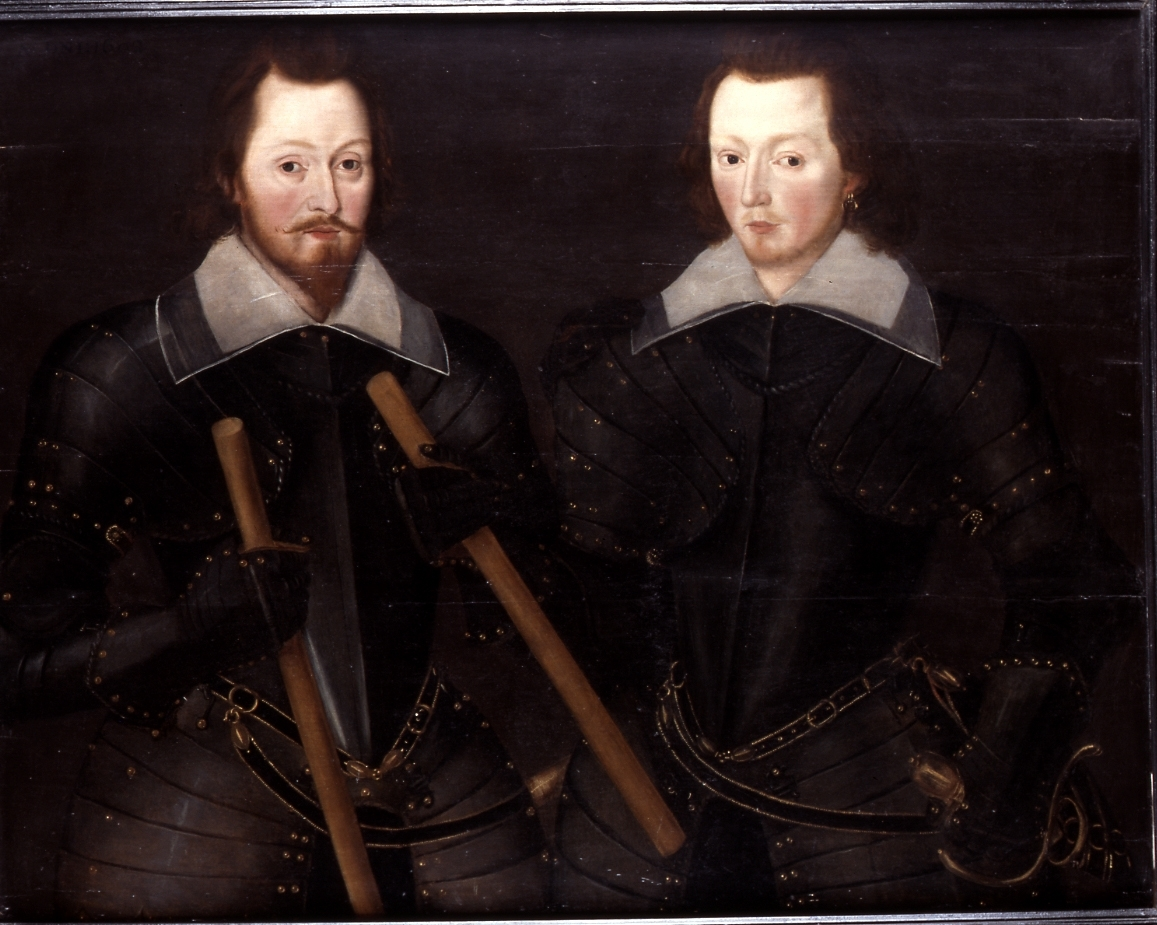
Sir Thomas Monson, 1st Baronet, and his son John, who succeeded him in the baronetcy.

- Sir Thomas Monson, 1st Baronet (1565–1641)
- Sir John Monson, 2nd Baronet (1599–1683)
- Sir Henry Monson, 3rd Baronet (1653–1718)
- Sir William Monson, 4th Baronet (c. 1654 – 1727)
- Sir John Monson, 5th Baronet (c. 1693 – 1748) (created Baron Monson in 1728)

=== Baron Monson (1728) ===
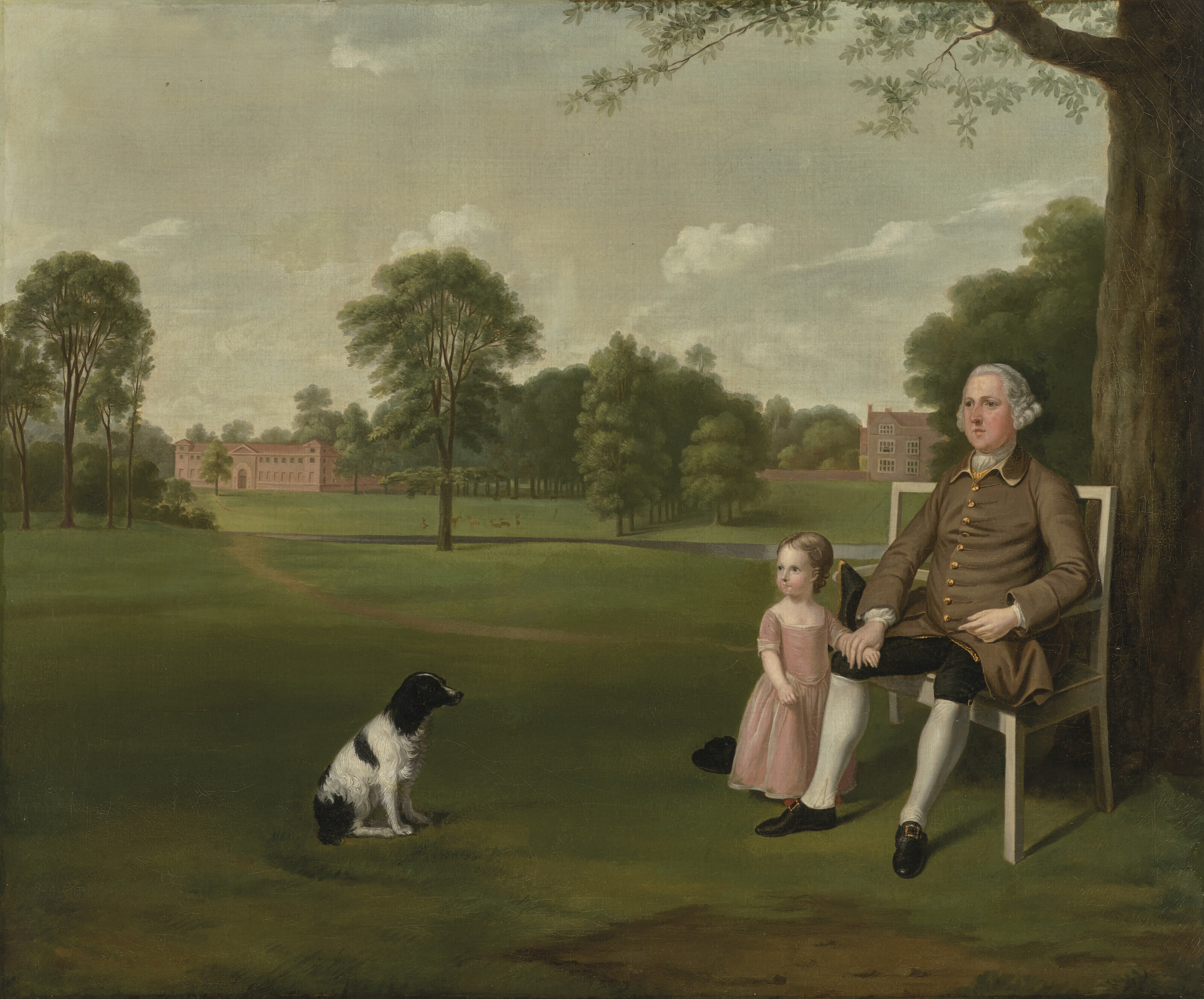
The 2nd Baron Monson with his eldest son, John, the future 3rd Baron Monson

- John Monson, 1st Baron Monson (c. 1693 – 1748)
- John Monson, 2nd Baron Monson (1727–1774)
- John Monson, 3rd Baron Monson (1753–1806)
- John George Monson, 4th Baron Monson (1785–1809)
- Frederick John Monson, 5th Baron Monson (1809–1841); married and separated from the women's rights campaigner Theodosia Monson.
- William John Monson, 6th Baron Monson (1796–1862); son of the former Ann Debonnaire and Colonel William Monson of Lincolnshire, was married to Eliza Larken. Educated at Oxford University, he was deputy-lieutenant of Lincolnshire in 1846. Their nine children include the heir to the title of Baron Monson, William John Monson, and Rt. Hon. Sir Edmund Monson, 1st Baronet.
- William John Monson, 7th Baron Monson (1829–1898) (created Viscount Oxenbridge in 1886)

=== Viscount Oxenbridge (1886) ===
- William Monson, 1st Viscount Oxenbridge (1829–1898)

=== Baron Monson (1728; reverted) ===
- Debonnaire John Monson, 8th Baron Monson (1830–1900)
- Augustus Debonnaire John Monson, 9th Baron Monson (1868–1940)
- John Roseberry Monson, 10th Baron Monson (1907–1958)
- John Monson, 11th Baron Monson (1932–2011)
- Nicholas John Monson, 12th Baron Monson (born 1955)
  - Hon. Alexander John Runan Monson (1984–2012), son and heir of the 12th Baron, was found dead whilst in police custody (pending charges of cannabis use) in Kenya. An inquest determined he was killed by police (an independent pathologist determined cause of death was a fatal blow to the back of the head), and a toxicology report found no drugs in his system at the time of his death.
  - Rupert Green (died 2017), illegitimate younger son of the 12th Baron; died aged 21 in hospital after an attempted suicide related to psychosis (presumably triggered by cannabis).

The heir presumptive is the present holder's younger brother, Hon. Andrew Anthony John Monson (born 1959).

=== Title succession chart ===
Title succession chart, Monson baronets and Barons Monson.

Sir Thomas Monson; 1st Baronet; 1565–1641
Sir John Monson; 2nd Baronet; 1599–1683
John Monson died 1674
Sir Henry Monson; 3rd Baronet; 1653–1718	Sir William Monson; 4th Baronet c. 1654 – 1727	George Monson; 1657/8 – ?
Baron Monson
John Monson; 1st Baron Monson; 5th Baronet c. 1693 – 1748
John Monson; 2nd Baron Monson; 1727–1774
John Monson; 3rd Baron Monson; 1753–1806	Hon. George Monson; 1755–1823	Lt.Gen. Hon. Charles Monson; 1758–1800	Col. Hon. William Monson; 1760–1807
John Monson; 4th Baron Monson; 1785–1809	William Monson; 6th Baron Monson; 1796–1862
Viscount Oxenbridge
Frederick Monson; 5th Baron Monson; 1809–1841	William Monson; 1st Viscount Oxenbridge; 7th Baron Monson; 1829–1898	Debonnaire Monson; 8th Baron Monson; 1830–1900
Viscountcy extinct
William Monson; 1864–1864	Augustus Monson; 9th Baron Monson; 1868–1940
John Monson; 10th Baron Monson; 1907–1958
John Monson; 11th Baron Monson; 1932–2011
Nicholas Monson; 12th Baron Monson born 1955	Hon. Andrew Monson born 1959
Hon. Alexander Monson; 1984–2012

== See also ==
- Earl Sondes
- Earl of Rockingham
- Monson baronets

Baronetage of England
Preceded by Cope baronets	Monson baronets 29 June 1611	Succeeded by Gresley baronets
