= Siege of Bharatpur (1805) =

1805 siege of the Second Anglo–Maratha War

- Part of the Second Anglo-Maratha War
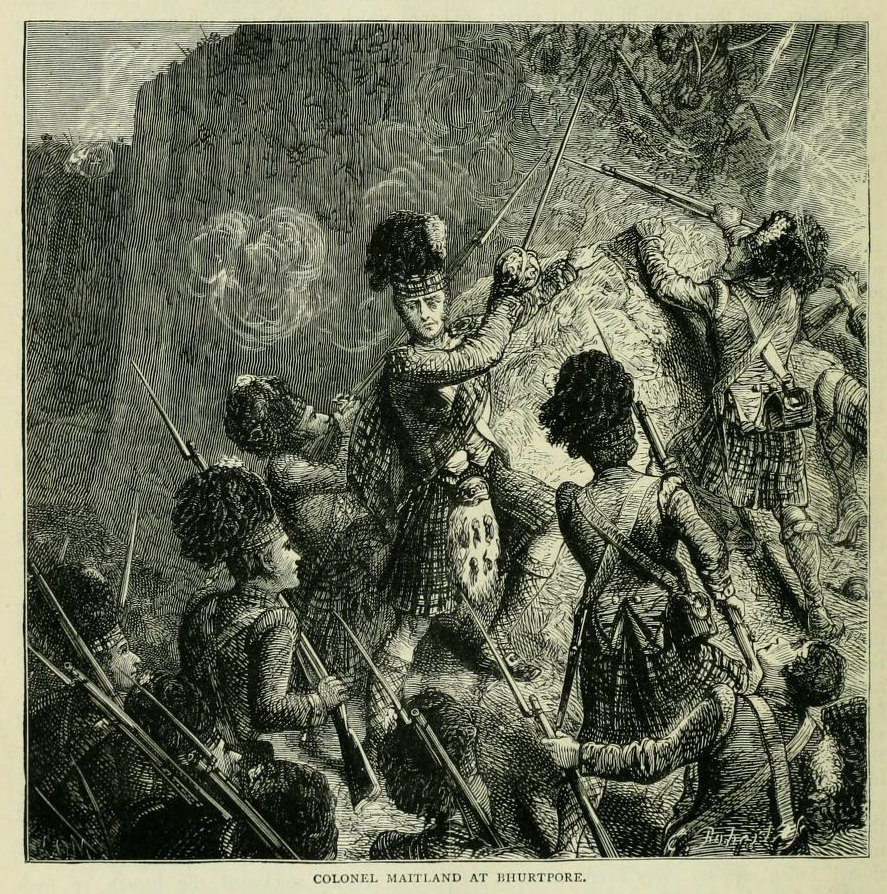
- Colonel Maitland at Bhurtpore
Date	2 January – 22 February 1805
Location	Bharatpur, Rajasthan, India 27.220°N 77.496°E
Result	Jat - Maratha victory

Belligerents
Bharatpur State; Maratha Empire: Indore State	(United Kingdom of Great Britain and Ireland) British Empire: East India Company

Commanders and leaders
Ranjit Singh; Jaswantrao Holkar	(East India Company) Gerard Lake

Strength
10,000	18,000

Casualties and losses
232 casualties	3,292 casualties
- Location within Rajasthan Bharatpur (India)

The siege of Bharatpur took place between 2 January and 22 February 1805 in the Indian Princely state of Bharatpur (now part of Rajasthan), during the Second Anglo-Maratha War. Forces of the British East India Company, led by General Gerard Lake, were repulsed four times in their attempts to storm the fortress.

== Background ==
The Ruler of Bharatpur, Ranjit Singh, had promised to join the British but instead formed an alliance with the Ruler of Indore Yashwantrao Holkar, who was allied to the Maratha Empire. Holkar suffered setbacks against the British at the Battle of Deeg and the Siege of Deeg. However, Ranjit Singh "came out openly on Holkar's side after the defeat of Monson." Lake arrived at Bharatpur fort on 2 January 1805.

== Siege ==
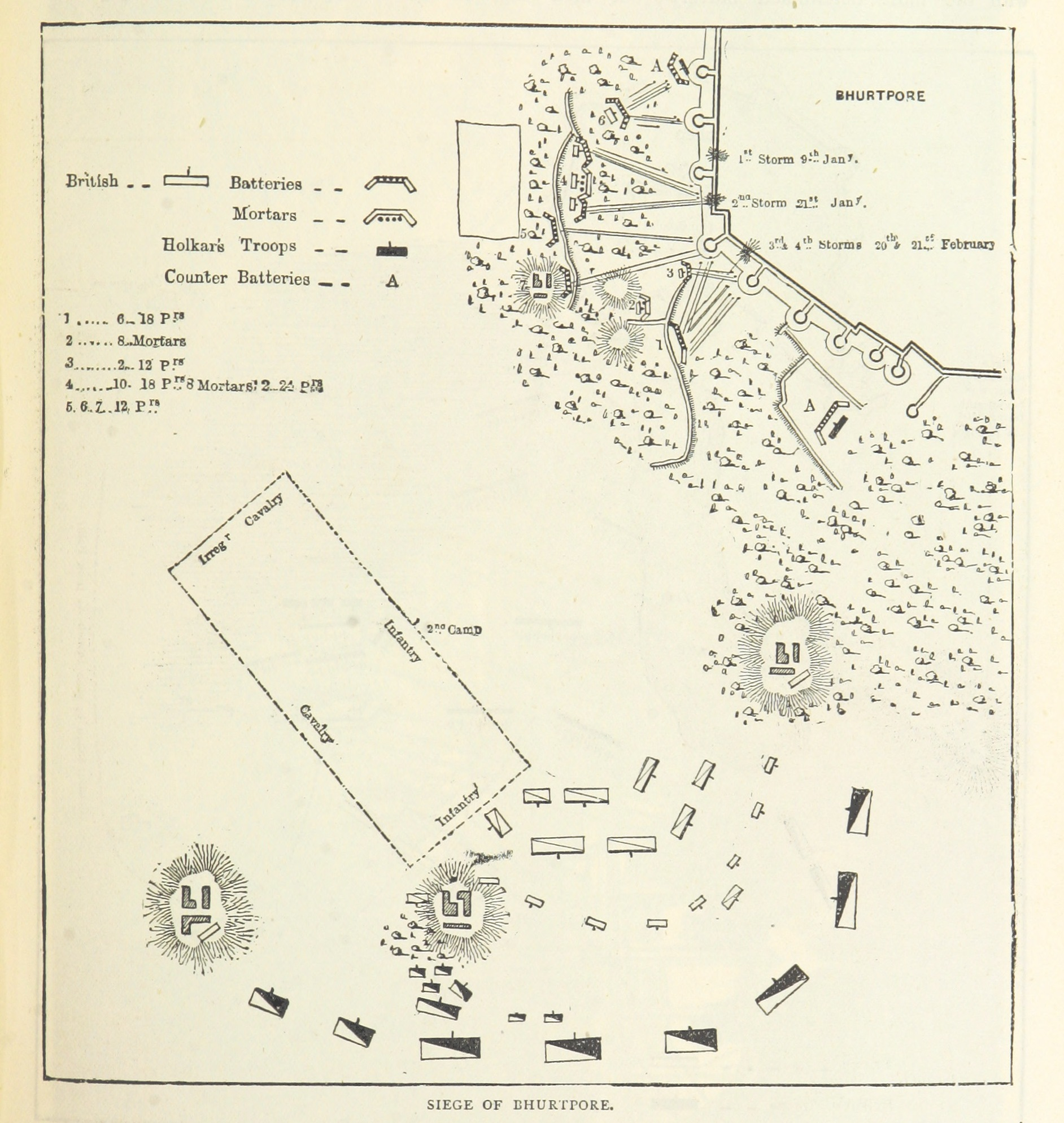
Siege of Bhurtpore

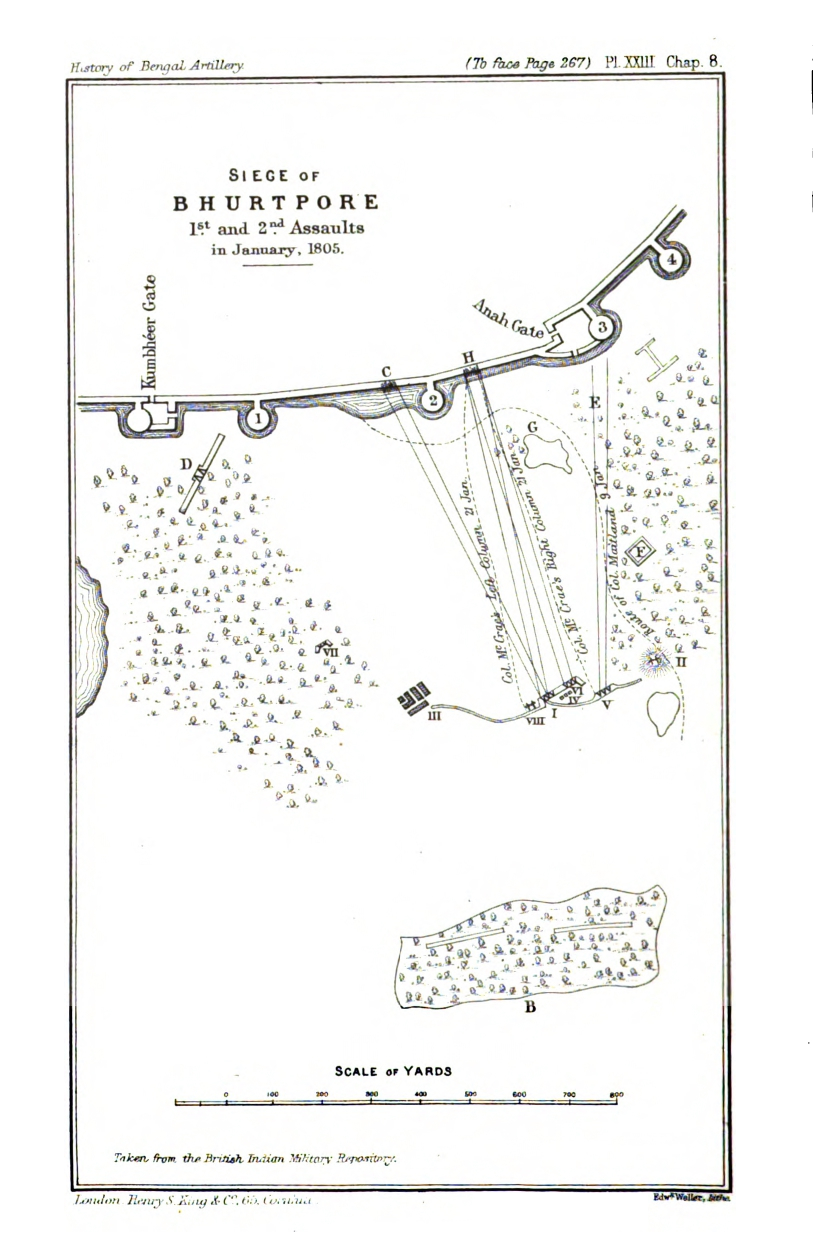
First and Second Assaults on Bhurtpore

The British bombardment started on 7 January 1805, and a breach was effected on 9 January. The first British assault took place that night, led by Col. Ryan, Maj. Hawkes and Lt. Col. Maitland. The assault failed with 400 British casualties, including Maitland being mortally wounded. A second attack on 16 January was also thrown back, after the Marathas added water to their moat. British casualties totaled 500, including the assault leader, Lt. Col. MacRoy. However, Lake continued to receive supplies and reinforcements, including Maj. Gen. R. Jones' force of 1600. This helped Lake deal with Amir Khan, Holkar's general, who was raiding Bundelkhand. A third assault on 20 February also failed, as did a fourth assault the next day. British casualties for all four assaults were 3,292. "The worst part of it was that many of the wounded were left behind where they had fallen. The defenders sallied out from the fort and killed them."

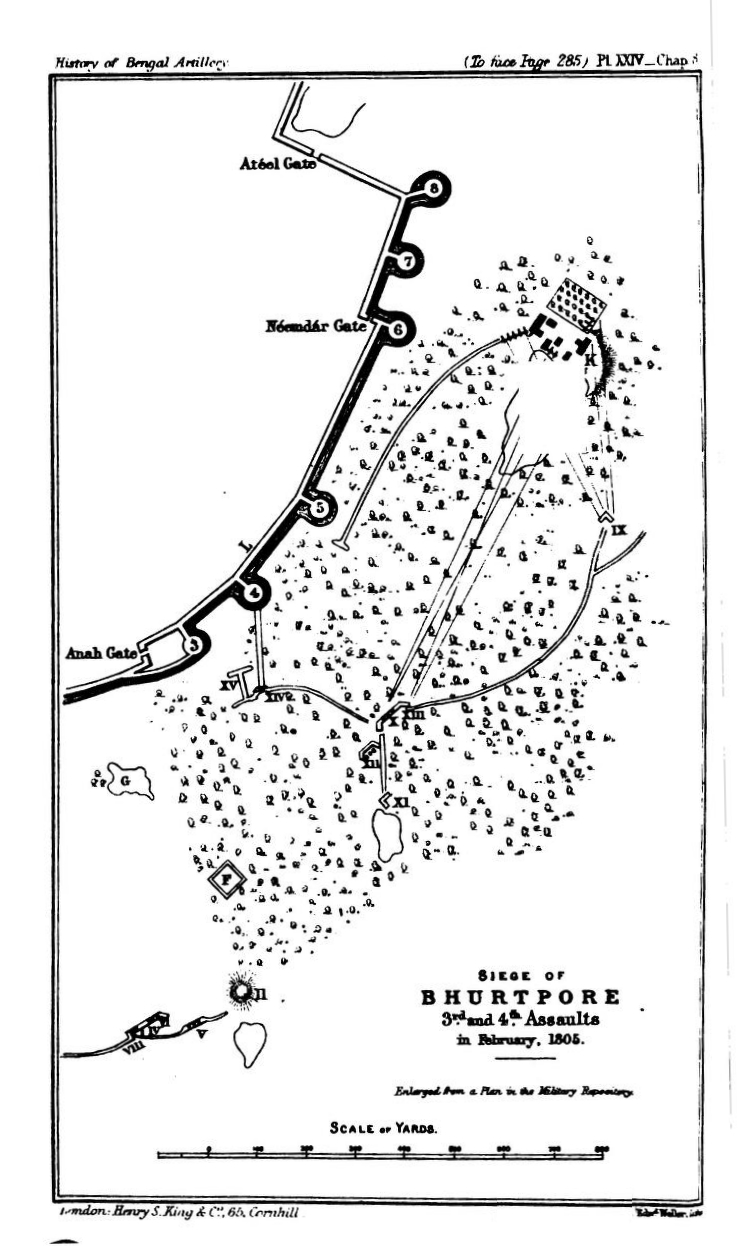
Third and Fourth Assaults on Bhurtpore

== Aftermath ==
Ranjit Singh decided to accept the British offer, and paid the British an indemnity, which allowed him to retain all his possessions, including Deeg. Caught between three British armies, led by Lake, Gen. Jones and Col. Ball, Holkar sent emissaries to Lake. A treaty was signed on 24 December 1805, in which he gave up any claim to Tonk, Rampura, and Bundi.
