= Rick Jones =

Rick Jones is the name of:

- Rick Jones (baseball coach), American former head coach of the Tulane Green Wave baseball team
- Rick Jones (character), fictional character from the Marvel Universe
- Rick Jones (pitcher) (born 1955), Major League Baseball pitcher
- Rick Jones (politician) (born 1952), Republican politician from Michigan
- Rick Jones (television presenter) (1937–2021), BBC children's programme presenter (1960s–1970s)
- Rick Jones (voice actor) (born 1957), animation writer, director and voice actor

== See also ==
- Rich Jones (disambiguation)
- Ricky Jones (disambiguation)
- Richard Jones (disambiguation)
