= List of Barnsley F.C. seasons =

Barnsley performances from 1898 until 2026

Barnsley Football Club is an English association football club based in the South Yorkshire town of Barnsley. Founded in 1887 under the name Barnsley St Peter's, the team played in the Sheffield & District League from the 1890–91 season and first entered the FA Cup in 1893–94. Two years later, they were accepted into the Midland League. The club changed its name to Barnsley F.C. in 1897; its team finished as Midland League runners-up in the first season under the new name and were elected to the newly expanded Second Division of the Football League for the 1898–99 season. A 16th-place finish in their second season meant they had to apply for re-election; the application was successful, and Barnsley continued safely in mid-table until 1911, when they again needed to be re-elected to the League. Their cup form was rather better: either side of that poor League placing, they reached the FA Cup final. In 1909–10, they drew 1–1 with Newcastle United in the final at Crystal Palace, but lost 1–0 in the replay at Everton's Goodison Park ground. Two seasons later, after taking three replays to get through the quarter-final, they played out a goalless draw with West Bromwich Albion at Crystal Palace; this time Barnsley won the replay, at Sheffield United's Bramall Lane ground, by one goal to nil.

In the remaining years before competitive football was suspended for the duration of the First World War, Barnsley established themselves as one of the stronger sides in the Second Division, placing third in 1914–15. The First Division was to be expanded by two teams for the first post-war season. Traditionally, existing top-flight teams were reprieved from relegation when such an expansion took place, but when the League chose to relegate Tottenham Hotspur, who had finished bottom, Barnsley had expectations of promotion. Instead of promoting the top three from the Second Division, the top two went up and the League opted to ballot its members as to the third candidate; Arsenal, who had finished fifth in 1915, won the ballot. Barnsley missed out on promotion in 1921–22 on goal average, and continued in the Second Division until 1931–32 when they went down to the Third Division North, also on goal average. They returned to the second tier as champions two years later, were relegated in 1938, and won another Third Division title in 1939.

After relegation in 1953, Barnsley won the Third Division championship for a third time in 1955, but ten years later they were in the Fourth Division. They moved between fourth and third tiers before two promotions in three years took them back to the Second Division in 1981, in which they remained for the next sixteen seasons. With two matches left to play in the 1996–97 season, to the accompaniment of chants of "It's just like watching Brazil", Danny Wilson had managed Barnsley to within one win of promotion to the Premier League. At home to Bradford City, Paul Wilkinson gave them a first-half lead, and with three minutes to go, Clint Marcelle scored the goal that made sure of the win. Barnsley's visit to the top flight was brief; they finished 19th, five points short of safety. They came close to a return in 2000 via the play-offs, losing 4–2 in the final after Ipswich Town's goalkeeper had saved a penalty and made a late save to deny them an equaliser.

Two years later, they were relegated to the third tier, which combined with the loss of revenue following the failure of ITV Digital and its broadcasting deal with the Football League made Barnsley one of some thirty clubs driven into administration. They recovered, and went on to beat Swansea City in a penalty shoot-out in the 2006 play-off final and return to the second tier, by then renamed the Championship. Despite finishing no higher than 17th place, they retained their second-tier status for eight seasons. Relegated in 2014, they returned via the play-offs, beating Millwall 3–1 in the 2016 final. Also in 2015–16, Barnsley beat Oxford United 3–2 in the final to win the Football League Trophy, a cup competition open to teams from the lower two divisions of the Football League, for the first time. They were again relegated in 2017–18, but made an immediate return to the Championship, and in 2020–21, reached the play-offs, in which they lost to Swansea City in the semi-final. In finishing bottom of the 2021–22 Championship, they recorded the second lowest number of wins and points (adjusted for three points for a win) in the club's history, won the fewest away matches since 1930, scored the fewest goals for 50 years and set a club record for fewest scored at home. The following season, they reached the play-offs, losing to Sheffield Wednesday in the final to a goal scored with six seconds of extra time remaining. In the 2023–24 FA Cup, Barnsley were taken to a replay by seventh-tier team Horsham which they won 3–0, but were then disqualified for fielding an ineligible player.

As of the end of the 2024–25 season, Barnsley have spent 10 seasons in the fourth tier of the English football league system, 27 in the third, 78 in the second and 1 in the top tier. The table details the team's achievements and the top goalscorer in senior first-team competitions from their first season in the Sheffield & District League in 1890–91 to the end of the most recently completed season.

== Key ==
Key to league record:

- P – Played
- W – Games won
- D – Games drawn
- L – Games lost
- F – Goals for
- A – Goals against
- Pts – Points
- Pos – Final position

Key to colours and symbols:
Symbol	Meaning
1st or W	Winners
2nd or F	Runners-up
↑	Promoted
↓	Relegated
♦	Top league scorer in Barnsley's division

Key to divisions:

- Sheff – Sheffield & District League
- Sheff 2 – Sheffield & District League Second Division
- Sheff C – Sheffield & District League Central Division
- Midland – Midland League
- Yorks – Yorkshire League
- Div 1 – Football League First Division
- Div 2 – Football League Second Division
- Div 3 – Football League Third Division
- Div 3N – Football League Third Division North
- Div 4 – Football League Fourth Division
- Prem – Premier League
- Champ – Football League Championship
- League 1 – Football League One

Key to rounds:

- Prelim – Preliminary round
- QR1 – First qualifying round
- QR2 – Second qualifying round, etc.
- Inter – Intermediate round (between qualifying rounds and rounds proper)
- R1 – First round
- R2 – Second round, etc.
- QF – Quarter-final
- SF – Semi-final
- F – Final
- W – Winners
- (N) – Northern section of regionalised stage
- DNE – Did not enter

Details of the abandoned 1939–40 Football League season are shown in italics and appropriately footnoted.

== Seasons ==
List of seasons, including league division and statistics, cup results and top scorer(s)
Season	League									FA Cup	League Cup	Other		Top league scorer(s) (Note: Seasons from 1898–99 to 2002–03 sourced to the English National Football Archive; seasons from 2003–04 onwards sourced to Soccerbase.)	
Season	Division (Note: Football League divisions are sorted according to their level within the English football league system, and separately from non-League divisions.)	P	W	D	L	F	A	Pts	Pos	FA Cup	League Cup	Competition	Result	Name	Goals
1890–91	Sheff	14	3	4	7	22	38	10	6th	—	—	—	—	Not known	—
1891–92	Sheff	18	11	2	5	50	37	24	3rd	—	—	—	—	Not known	—
1892–93	Sheff	26	15	3	8	84	45	33	4th	—	—	—	—	Not known	—
1893–94	Sheff 2	8	4	3	1	19	8	11	2nd	QR1	—	—	—	Not known	—
1894–95	Sheff C	10	4	5	1	19	21	9	4th (Note: The Central Division of the Sheffield & District League was combined with the Wharncliffe Charity Cup. The club chose not to enter the Midland League.)	R1	—	—	—	Not known	—
1895–96	Midland	28	13	3	12	62	52	29	8th	QR1	—	—	—	Not known	—
1896–97	Midland	28	10	4	14	57	71	24	11th	R1	—	—	—	Not known	—
1897–98	Midland ↑; Yorks	22; 18	14; 11	3; 3	5; 4	47; 62	29; 27	31; 25	2nd; 3rd	QR3	—	—	—	Not known	—
1898–99	Div 2	34	12	7	15	52	56	31	11th	QR5	—	—	—	Harry Davis	15
1899–1900	Div 2	34	8	7	19	46	79	23	16th (Note: Successfully applied for re-election to the Football League.)	QR4	—	—	—	Dickie Jones	8
1900–01	Div 2	34	11	5	18	47	60	27	15th	QR5	—	—	—	Andrew Swann	18 ♦
1901–02	Div 2	34	12	6	16	51	63	30	11th	QR5	—	—	—	Don Lees	10
1902–03	Div 2	34	13	8	13	55	51	34	8th	R2	—	—	—	Benny Green	16
1903–04	Div 2	34	11	10	13	38	57	32	8th	Inter	—	—	—	Alec Hellewell	7
1904–05	Div 2	34	14	5	15	38	56	33	7th	Inter	—	—	—	Aaron Jones	11
1905–06	Div 2	38	12	9	17	60	62	33	12th	R2	—	—	—	George Wall	14
1906–07	Div 2	38	15	8	15	73	55	38	8th	QF	—	—	—	George Reeves	13
1907–08	Div 2	38	12	6	20	54	68	30	16th	R1	—	—	—	George Reeves	14
1908–09	Div 2	38	11	10	17	48	57	32	17th	R1	—	—	—	George Lillycrop	18
1909–10	Div 2	38	16	7	15	62	59	39	9th	F (Note: Entered the competition in the first round and progressed to the final at Crystal Palace, in which they drew 1–1 with Newcastle United. In the replay, they lost 1–0 at Everton's Goodison Park ground.)	—	—	—	George Lillycrop	23
1910–11	Div 2	38	7	14	17	52	62	28	19th	R2	—	—	—	Harry Tufnell	14
1911–12	Div 2	38	15	12	11	45	42	42	6th	W (Note: For the second time in three seasons, entered the competition in the first round and progressed to the final. They needed three replays to get past Bradford City in the quarter-final. They played out a goalless draw with West Bromwich Albion at Crystal Palace, and this time won the replay, at Sheffield United's Bramall Lane ground, by one goal to nil.)	—	—	—	Harry Tufnell	11
1912–13	Div 2	38	19	7	12	57	47	45	4th	R2	—	—	—	George Lillycrop	22
1913–14	Div 2	38	19	7	12	51	45	45	5th	R1	—	—	—	Jimmy Moore	14
1914–15	Div 2	38	22	3	13	51	51	47	3rd	R1	—	—	—	Harry Tufnell	9
1915–19	The Football League and FA Cup were suspended until after the First World War.														
1919–20	Div 2	42	15	10	17	61	55	40	12th	R2	—	—	—	Joe Halliwell	21
1920–21	Div 2	42	10	16	16	48	50	36	16th	R1	—	—	—	Russell Wainscoat	13
1921–22	Div 2	42	22	8	12	67	52	52	3rd	R3	—	—	—	Brough Fletcher; Russell Wainscoat	17
1922–23	Div 2	42	17	11	14	62	51	45	9th	R2	—	—	—	Ernie Hine	24
1923–24	Div 2	42	16	11	15	57	61	43	11th	R1	—	—	—	Ernie Hine	19
1924–25	Div 2	42	13	12	17	46	59	38	15th	R2	—	—	—	Ernie Hine	15
1925–26	Div 2	42	12	12	18	58	84	36	18th	R1	—	—	—	Ernie Hine	12
1926–27	Div 2	42	17	9	16	88	87	43	11th	R4	—	—	—	Jimmy Curran; Frank Eaton	21
1927–28	Div 2	42	14	11	17	65	85	39	13th	R3	—	—	—	Frank Eaton	15
1928–29	Div 2	42	16	6	20	69	66	38	16th	R3	—	—	—	Frank Eaton	15
1929–30	Div 2	42	14	8	20	56	71	36	17th	R3	—	—	—	Jack Wallbanks	12
1930–31	Div 2	42	13	9	20	59	79	35	19th	R5	—	—	—	Jack Wallbanks	11
1931–32	Div 2 ↓	42	12	9	21	55	91	33	21st	R3	—	—	—	Jack Wallbanks	22
1932–33	Div 3N	42	19	8	15	92	80	46	8th	R3	—	—	—	Jack Wallbanks	20
1933–34	Div 3N ↑	42	27	8	7	118	61	62	1st	R1	—	Third Division North Cup	R1	Abe Blight	31
1934–35	Div 2	42	13	12	17	60	83	38	16th	R3	—	—	—	Frank Chivers	12
1935–36	Div 2	42	12	9	21	54	80	33	20th	QF	—	—	—	Ernie Hine	14
1936–37	Div 2	42	16	9	17	50	64	41	14th	R3	—	—	—	Ernie Hine	13
1937–38	Div 2 ↓	42	11	14	17	50	64	36	21st	R4	—	—	—	Doug Hunt	14
1938–39	Div 3N ↑	42	30	7	5	94	34	67	1st	R3	—	Third Division North Cup	DNE (Note: Clubs reaching the third round of the 1938–39 FA Cup were excused from entering the Northern Section Cup.)	Beaumont Asquith	28
1939–40	Div 2	3	1	0	2	7	8	2	(Note: The 1939–40 season was abandoned with three matches played when the Second World War began.)	—	—	—	—	Bud Maxwell	4
1939–45	The Football League and FA Cup were suspended until after the Second World War.														
1945–46	—	—	—	—	—	—	—	—	—	R5 (Note: Although the Football League did not resume until the 1946–47 season, the FA Cup was contested in 1945–46. From the first round proper to the sixth round (quarter-final), results were determined on aggregate score over two legs.)	—	—	—	—	—
1946–47	Div 2	42	17	8	17	84	86	42	10th	R4	—	—	—	George Robledo	23
1947–48	Div 2	42	15	10	17	62	64	40	12th	R3	—	—	—	Steve Griffiths	9
1948–49	Div 2	42	14	12	16	62	61	40	9th	R3	—	—	—	Jimmy Baxter	15
1949–50	Div 2	42	13	13	16	64	67	39	13th	R3	—	—	—	Alex Wright	17
1950–51	Div 2	42	15	10	17	74	68	40	15th	R3	—	—	—	Cec McCormack	33
1951–52	Div 2	42	11	14	17	59	72	36	20th	R4	—	—	—	Eddie McMorran	15
1952–53	Div 2 ↓	42	5	8	29	47	108	18	22nd	R4	—	—	—	Tommy Taylor	20
1953–54	Div 3N	46	24	10	12	77	57	58	2nd	R2	—	—	—	Bobby Brown	24
1954–55	Div 3N ↑	46	30	5	11	86	46	65	1st	R2	—	—	—	Lol Chappell	21
1955–56	Div 2	42	11	12	19	47	84	34	18th	R4	—	—	—	Bobby Brown	11
1956–57	Div 2	42	12	10	20	59	89	34	19th	R5	—	—	—	Arthur Kaye	15
1957–58	Div 2	42	14	12	16	70	74	40	14th	R3	—	—	—	Lol Chappell	19
1958–59	Div 2 ↓	42	10	7	25	55	91	27	22nd	R3	—	—	—	Lol Chappell	17
1959–60	Div 3	46	15	14	17	65	66	44	17th	R1	—	—	—	Jackie Lunn	13
1960–61	Div 3	46	21	7	18	83	80	49	8th	QF	R2 (Note: The Football League Cup competition started in the 1960–61 season.)	—	—	Frank Bartlett	17
1961–62	Div 3	46	13	12	21	71	95	38	20th	R2	R2	—	—	Frank Bartlett	15
1962–63	Div 3	46	15	11	20	63	74	41	18th	R3	R3	—	—	Tony Leighton	22
1963–64	Div 3	46	12	15	19	68	94	39	20th	R5	R2	—	—	Tony Leighton	24
1964–65	Div 3 ↓	46	9	11	26	54	90	29	24th	R2	R2	—	—	Tony Leighton	13
1965–66	Div 4	46	15	10	21	74	78	40	16th	R2	R1	—	—	Martin Ferguson; George Kerr	17
1966–67	Div 4	46	13	15	18	60	64	41	16th	R3	R1	—	—	Barrie Thomas	10
1967–68	Div 4 ↑	46	24	13	9	68	46	61	2nd	R1	R1	—	—	Johnny Evans	15
1968–69	Div 3	46	16	14	16	58	63	46	10th	R3	R2	—	—	Eric Winstanley	12
1969–70	Div 3	46	19	15	12	68	59	53	7th	R3	R1	—	—	Johnny Evans	15
1970–71	Div 3	46	17	11	18	49	52	45	12th	R2	R1	—	—	Johnny Evans	9
1971–72	Div 3 ↓	46	9	18	19	32	64	36	22nd	R2	R2	—	—	Jimmy Seal	12
1972–73	Div 4	46	14	16	16	58	60	44	14th	R1	R1	—	—	Les Lea	12
1973–74	Div 4	46	17	10	19	58	64	44	13th	R2	R1	—	—	Mick Butler	21
1974–75	Div 4	46	15	11	20	62	65	41	15th	R1	R1	—	—	Mick Butler	19
1975–76	Div 4	46	14	16	16	52	48	44	12th	R1	R1	—	—	John Peachey	10
1976–77	Div 4	46	23	9	14	62	39	55	6th	R2	R2	—	—	Brian Joicey (Note: The English National Football Archive general source gives Joicey 26 league goals in 1976–77 while RSSSF list him as divisional top scorer with 25.)	26 ♦
1977–78	Div 4	46	18	14	14	61	49	50	7th	R2	R1	—	—	Brian Joicey	14
1978–79	Div 4 ↑	46	24	13	9	73	42	61	4th	R2	R1	—	—	Derek Bell	18
1979–80	Div 3	46	16	14	16	53	56	46	11th	R2	R2	—	—	Ronnie Glavin	20
1980–81	Div 3 ↑	46	21	17	8	72	45	59	2nd	R5	R4	—	—	Ronnie Glavin	18
1981–82	Div 2	42	19	10	13	59	41	67 (Note: The 1981–82 season saw the introduction of three points for a win instead of two.)	6th	R3	QF	—	—	Ian Banks	15
1982–83	Div 2	42	14	15	13	57	55	57	10th	R4	R4	—	—	Ronnie Glavin	17
1983–84	Div 2	42	15	7	20	57	53	52	14th	R3	R2	—	—	David Geddis	14
1984–85	Div 2	42	14	16	12	42	42	58	11th	QF	R2	—	—	Gordon Owen	14
1985–86	Div 2	42	14	14	14	47	50	56	12th	R3	R2	—	—	Ian Walsh	15
1986–87	Div 2	42	14	13	15	49	52	55	11th	R5	R2	Full Members' Cup	R1	Stuart Gray	11
1987–88	Div 2	44	15	12	17	61	62	57	14th	R4	R3	Full Members' Cup	R1	Steve Lowndes (Note: RSSSF list David Currie as 1987–88 divisional top scorer with 28 goals, but 21 of those were scored for Darlington in the Fourth Division before he joined Barnsley.)	9
1988–89	Div 2	46	20	14	12	66	58	74	7th	R5	R2	Full Members' Cup	R1	David Currie	16
1989–90	Div 2	46	13	15	18	49	71	54	19th	R5	R2	Full Members' Cup	R2(N)	Steve Agnew	8
1990–91	Div 2	46	19	12	15	63	48	69	8th	R3	R2	Full Members' Cup	SF(N)	Andy Rammell; Andy Saville	12
1991–92	Div 2	46	16	11	19	46	57	59	16th	R3	R3	Full Members' Cup	R1(N)	Andy Rammell	8
1992–93	Div 1 (Note: When the newly formed FA Premier League split from the Football League, the remaining divisions of the Football League were renumbered upwards.)	46	17	9	20	56	60	60	13th	R5	R1	Anglo-Italian Cup	Prelim	Wayne Biggins	14
1993–94	Div 1	46	16	7	23	55	67	55	18th	R5	R2	Anglo-Italian Cup	Prelim	Andy Liddell; Neil Redfearn	12
1994–95	Div 1	46	20	12	14	63	52	72	6th	R3	R2	—	—	Andy Liddell	13
1995–96	Div 1	46	14	18	14	60	66	60	10th	R3	R3	—	—	Andy Payton	17
1996–97	Div 1 ↑	46	22	14	10	76	55	80	2nd	R4	R2	—	—	Neil Redfearn	17
1997–98	Prem ↓	38	10	5	23	37	82	35	19th	QF	R3	—	—	Neil Redfearn	10
1998–99	Div 1	46	14	17	15	59	56	59	13th	QF	R4	—	—	Ashley Ward	12
1999–2000	Div 1	46	24	10	12	88	67	82	4th (Note: After beating Birmingham City 5–2 on aggregate in the play-off semi-final, lost 4–2 to Ipswich Town in the final.)	R3	R4	—	—	Craig Hignett	19
2000–01	Div 1	46	15	9	22	49	62	54	16th	R3	R3	—	—	Bruce Dyer	15
2001–02	Div 1 ↓	46	11	15	20	59	86	48	23rd	R3	R3	—	—	Bruce Dyer	14
2002–03	Div 2	46	13	13	20	51	64	52	19th	R1	R1	Football League Trophy	R2(N)	Bruce Dyer	17
2003–04	Div 2	46	15	17	14	54	58	62	12th	R3	R1	Football League Trophy	R1(N)	Kevin Betsy	10
2004–05	League 1 (Note: From the 2004–05 season, the Football League divisions were rebranded: Division One was renamed the Football League Championship, and Divisions Two and Three became Football League One and Football League Two respectively.)	46	14	19	13	69	64	61	13th	R1	R2	Football League Trophy	R1(N)	Michael Chopra	17
2005–06	League 1 ↑	46	18	18	10	62	44	72	5th (Note: After beating Huddersfield Town 3–2 on aggregate in the play-off semi-final, beat Swansea City in the final in a penalty shoot-out to gain promotion to the Championship.)	R3	R2	Football League Trophy	R1(N)	Marc Richards	12
2006–07	Champ	46	15	5	26	53	85	50	20th	R3	R2	—	—	Daniel Nardiello	9
2007–08	Champ	46	14	13	19	52	65	55	18th	SF	R2	—	—	Brian Howard	13
2008–09	Champ	46	13	13	20	45	58	52	20th	R3	R1	—	—	Jamal Campbell-Ryce; Jon Macken	9
2009–10	Champ	46	14	12	20	53	69	54	18th	R3	R4	—	—	Daniel Bogdanović	11
2010–11	Champ	46	14	14	18	55	66	56	17th	R3	R1	—	—	Adam Hammill	8
2011–12	Champ	46	13	9	24	49	74	48	21st	R3	R1	—	—	Craig Davies	11
2012–13	Champ	46	14	13	19	56	70	55	21st	QF	R2	—	—	Craig Davies	8
2013–14	Champ ↓	46	9	12	25	44	77	39	23rd	R3	R2	—	—	Chris O'Grady	15
2014–15	League 1	46	17	11	18	62	61	62	11th	R3	R1	Football League Trophy	R2(N)	Conor Hourihane	13
2015–16	League 1 ↑	46	22	8	16	70	54	74	6th (Note: After beating Walsall 6–1 on aggregate in the play-off semi-final, beat Millwall 3–1 in the final to gain promotion to the Championship.)	R1	R2	Football League Trophy	W (Note: Beat Oxford United 3–2 in the final to win the Football League Trophy for the first time.)	Sam Winnall	21
2016–17	Champ	46	15	13	18	64	67	58	14th	R3	R1	—	—	Sam Winnall	11
2017–18	Champ ↓	46	9	14	23	48	72	41	22nd	R3	R3	—	—	Tom Bradshaw; Oli McBurnie	9
2018–19	League 1 ↑	46	26	13	7	80	39	91	2nd	R3	R1	EFL Trophy	R2	Kieffer Moore	17
2019–20	Champ	46	12	13	21	49	69	49	21st	R4	R1	—	—	Cauley Woodrow	14
2020–21	Champ	46	23	9	14	58	50	78	5th (Note: Lost 2–1 on aggregate to Swansea City in the play-off semi-final.)	R5	R3	—	—	Cauley Woodrow	12
2021–22	Champ ↓	46	6	12	28	33	73	30	24th	R4	R1	—	—	Carlton Morris	7
2022–23	League 1	46	26	8	12	80	47	86	4th (Note: After beating Bolton Wanderers 2–1 on aggregate in the play-off semi-final, lost 1–0 to Sheffield Wednesday in the final.)	R3	R2	EFL Trophy	R2	Devante Cole	15
2023–24	League 1	46	21	13	12	82	64	76	6th (Note: Lost 5–4 on aggregate to Bolton Wanderers in the play-off semi-final.)	DQ (Note: After drawing 3–3 at home to Isthmian League Premier Division (seventh-tier) club Horsham in the FA Cup first round, Barnsley won the replay 3–0. They were then disqualified for fielding an ineligible player, and Horsham reinstated.)	R1	EFL Trophy	R2	Devante Cole	18
2024–25	League 1	46	17	10	19	69	73	61	12th	R2	R3	EFL Trophy	GS	Davis Keillor-Dunn	17
