= 2004–05 Football League Championship =

Football League Championship
- Season: 2004–05
- Champions: Sunderland; 1st Championship title 4th 2nd tier title
- Promoted: Sunderland; Wigan Athletic; West Ham United
- Relegated: Gillingham; Nottingham Forest; Rotherham United

The 2004–05 Football League Championship (known as the Coca-Cola Championship for sponsorship reasons) was the thirteenth season under its current league division format. It began in August 2004 and concluded in May 2005, with the promotion play-off finals. This was the first season to feature the rebranded Football League. The First Division, Second Division and Third Division were renamed the Football League Championship, Football League One and Football League Two respectively. Coca-Cola replaced the Nationwide Building Society as title sponsor.

The winners of the Championship in 2005 are Sunderland. Wigan Athletic reached the Premiership as Championship runners-up and became the first club to make a debut in the top tier of English football since Barnsley's promotion after the 1996–97 season. They had been elected to the Football League only 27 years earlier, had been the league's fourth lowest club eleven years earlier and had never played in the upper half of The Football League until two years before reaching the Premier League. Nottingham Forest were relegated from the Championship to League One, becoming the first former European Cup winners to slide into the third tier of their domestic league – having won two straight European Cups a quarter of a century earlier. Just ten years ago they had finished third in the Premiership and reached the following season's UEFA Cup quarter finals.

== Changes from last season ==
=== From Championship ===
Promoted to Premier League

- Norwich City
- West Bromwich Albion
- Crystal Palace

Relegated to League One

- Walsall
- Bradford City
- Wimbledon

=== To Championship ===
Relegated from Premier League

- Leicester City
- Leeds United
- Wolverhampton Wanderers

Promoted from League One

- Plymouth Argyle
- Queens Park Rangers
- Brighton & Hove Albion

== League table ==
Pos	Team	Pld	W	D	L	GF	GA	GD	Pts	Promotion, qualification or relegation
1	Sunderland (C, P)	46	29	7	10	76	41	+35	94	Promotion to the FA Premier League
2	Wigan Athletic (P)	46	25	12	9	79	35	+44	87	Promotion to the FA Premier League
3	Ipswich Town	46	24	13	9	85	56	+29	85	Qualification for Championship play-offs
4	Derby County	46	22	10	14	71	60	+11	76	Qualification for Championship play-offs
5	Preston North End	46	21	12	13	67	58	+9	75	Qualification for Championship play-offs
6	West Ham United (O, P)	46	21	10	15	66	56	+10	73	Qualification for Championship play-offs
7	Reading	46	19	13	14	51	44	+7	70	
8	Sheffield United	46	18	13	15	57	56	+1	67	
9	Wolverhampton Wanderers	46	15	21	10	72	59	+13	66	
10	Millwall	46	18	12	16	51	45	+6	66	
11	Queens Park Rangers	46	17	11	18	54	58	−4	62	
12	Stoke City	46	17	10	19	36	38	−2	61	
13	Burnley	46	15	15	16	38	39	−1	60	
14	Leeds United	46	14	18	14	49	52	−3	60	
15	Leicester City	46	12	21	13	49	46	+3	57	
16	Cardiff City	46	13	15	18	48	51	−3	54	
17	Plymouth Argyle	46	14	11	21	52	64	−12	53	
18	Watford	46	12	16	18	52	59	−7	52	
19	Coventry City	46	13	13	20	61	73	−12	52	
20	Brighton & Hove Albion	46	13	12	21	40	65	−25	51	
21	Crewe Alexandra	46	12	14	20	66	86	−20	50	
22	Gillingham (R)	46	12	14	20	45	66	−21	50	Relegation to Football League One
23	Nottingham Forest (R)	46	9	17	20	42	66	−24	44	Relegation to Football League One
24	Rotherham United (R)	46	5	14	27	35	69	−34	29	Relegation to Football League One

Updated to match(es) played on 9 December 2011. Source: Football League Tables
Rules for classification: 1) points; 2) goal difference; 3) number of goals scored.
(C) Champions; (O) Play-off winners; (P) Promoted; (R) Relegated

=== Play-offs ===
Semi-finals
6	West Ham United	2	2	4
3	Ipswich Town	2	0	2
5	Preston North End	2	0	2
4	Derby County	0	0	0

Final
5	Preston North End	0
6	West Ham United	1

== Results ==
Home \ Away	BHA	BUR	CAR	COV	CRE	DER	GIL	IPS	LEE	LEI	MIL	NOT	PLY	PNE	QPR	REA	ROT	SHE	STK	SUN	WAT	WHU	WIG	WOL
Brighton & Hove Albion		0–1	1–1	1–1	1–3	2–3	2–1	1–1	1–0	1–1	1–0	0–0	0–2	1–0	2–3	0–1	1–0	1–1	0–1	2–1	2–1	2–2	2–4	0–1
Burnley	1–1		1–0	2–2	3–0	0–2	1–2	0–2	0–1	0–0	1–0	1–0	2–0	2–0	2–0	0–0	2–1	1–1	2–2	0–2	3–1	0–1	1–0	1–1
Cardiff City	2–0	2–0		2–1	1–1	0–2	3–1	0–1	0–0	0–0	0–1	3–0	0–1	0–1	1–0	2–0	2–0	1–0	0–1	0–2	0–3	4–1	0–2	1–1
Coventry City	2–1	0–2	1–1		0–1	6–2	2–2	1–2	1–2	1–1	0–1	2–0	2–1	1–1	1–2	3–2	0–0	1–2	0–0	2–0	1–0	2–1	1–2	2–2
Crewe Alexandra	3–1	1–1	2–2	2–1		1–2	4–1	2–2	2–2	2–2	2–1	1–1	3–0	1–2	0–2	1–1	1–1	2–3	0–2	0–1	3–0	2–3	1–3	1–4
Derby County	3–0	1–1	0–1	2–2	2–4		2–0	3–2	2–0	1–2	0–3	3–0	1–0	3–1	0–0	2–1	3–2	0–1	3–1	0–2	2–2	1–1	1–1	3–3
Gillingham	0–1	1–0	1–1	3–1	1–1	0–2		0–0	2–1	0–2	0–0	2–1	1–0	2–1	0–1	0–0	3–1	1–3	2–1	0–4	0–0	0–1	2–1	1–0
Ipswich Town	1–0	1–1	3–1	3–2	5–1	3–2	2–1		1–0	2–1	2–0	6–0	3–2	3–0	0–2	1–1	4–3	5–1	1–0	2–2	1–2	0–2	2–1	2–1
Leeds United	1–1	1–2	1–1	3–0	0–2	1–0	1–1	1–1		0–2	1–1	1–1	2–1	1–0	6–1	3–1	0–0	0–4	0–0	0–1	2–2	2–1	0–2	1–1
Leicester City	0–1	0–0	1–1	3–0	1–1	1–0	2–0	2–2	2–0		3–1	0–1	2–1	1–1	1–0	0–2	0–1	3–2	1–1	0–1	0–1	0–0	0–2	1–1
Millwall	2–0	0–0	2–2	1–1	4–3	3–1	2–1	3–1	1–1	2–0		1–0	3–0	2–1	0–0	1–0	1–2	1–2	0–1	2–0	0–2	1–0	0–2	1–2
Nottingham Forest	0–1	1–0	0–0	1–4	2–2	2–2	2–2	1–1	0–0	1–1	1–2		0–3	2–0	2–1	1–0	2–2	1–1	1–0	1–2	1–2	2–1	1–1	1–0
Plymouth Argyle	5–1	1–0	1–1	1–1	3–0	0–2	2–1	1–2	0–1	0–0	0–0	3–2		0–2	2–1	2–2	1–1	3–0	0–0	2–1	1–0	1–1	1–2	1–2
Preston North End	3–0	1–0	3–0	3–2	1–0	3–0	1–1	1–1	2–4	1–1	1–1	3–2	1–1		2–1	3–0	2–0	0–1	3–0	3–2	2–1	2–1	1–1	2–2
Queens Park Rangers	0–0	3–0	1–0	4–1	1–2	0–2	1–1	2–4	1–1	3–2	1–1	2–1	3–2	1–2		0–0	1–1	0–1	1–0	1–3	3–1	1–0	1–0	1–1
Reading	3–2	0–0	2–1	1–2	4–0	0–1	3–1	1–1	1–1	0–0	2–1	1–0	0–0	3–1	1–0		1–0	0–0	1–0	1–0	3–0	3–1	1–1	1–2
Rotherham United	0–1	0–0	2–2	1–2	2–3	1–3	1–3	0–2	1–0	0–2	1–1	0–0	0–1	1–2	0–1	1–0		2–2	1–1	0–1	0–1	2–2	0–2	1–2
Sheffield United	1–2	2–1	2–1	1–1	4–0	0–1	0–0	0–2	2–0	2–0	0–1	1–1	2–1	1–1	3–2	0–1	1–0		0–0	1–0	1–1	1–2	0–2	3–3
Stoke City	2–0	0–1	1–3	1–0	1–0	1–0	2–0	3–2	0–1	3–2	1–0	0–0	2–0	0–0	0–1	0–1	1–2	2–0		0–1	0–1	0–1	0–1	2–1
Sunderland	2–0	2–1	2–1	1–0	3–1	0–0	1–1	2–0	2–3	2–1	1–0	2–0	5–1	3–1	2–2	1–2	4–1	1–0	1–0		4–2	0–2	1–1	3–1
Watford	1–1	0–1	0–0	2–3	3–1	2–2	2–0	2–2	1–2	2–2	1–0	0–2	3–1	0–2	3–0	0–1	0–0	0–0	0–1	1–1		1–2	0–0	1–1
West Ham United	0–1	1–0	1–0	3–0	1–1	1–2	3–1	1–1	1–1	2–2	1–1	3–2	5–0	1–2	2–1	1–0	1–0	0–2	2–0	1–2	3–2		1–3	1–0
Wigan Athletic	3–0	0–0	2–1	4–1	4–1	1–2	2–0	1–0	3–0	0–0	2–0	1–1	0–2	5–0	0–0	3–1	2–0	4–0	0–1	0–1	2–2	1–2		2–0
Wolverhampton Wanderers	1–1	2–0	2–3	0–1	1–1	2–0	2–2	2–0	0–0	1–1	1–2	2–1	1–1	2–2	2–1	4–1	2–0	4–2	1–1	1–1	0–0	4–2	3–3	

Updated to match(es) played on 10 September 2020. Source:
Legend: Blue = home team win; Yellow = draw; Red = away team win.

== Stadiums ==
Locations of teams in the 2004–05 Football League Championship

Team	Stadium	Capacity
Sunderland	Stadium of Light	49,000
Leeds United	Elland Road	37,697
West Ham United	Boleyn Ground	35,146
Derby County	Pride Park Stadium	33,597
Sheffield United	Bramall Lane	32,609
Leicester City	Walkers Stadium	32,500
Nottingham Forest	City Ground	30,602
Ipswich Town	Portman Road	30,311
Wolverhampton Wanderers	Molineux Stadium	28,525
Stoke City	Britannia Stadium	28,000
Wigan Athletic	JJB Stadium	25,138
Preston North End	Deepdale	24,500
Reading	Madejski Stadium	24,161
Coventry City	Highfield Road	23,489
Burnley	Turf Moor	22,546
Cardiff City	Ninian Park	22,008
Millwall	The New Den	20,146
Watford	Vicarage Road	19,920
Plymouth Argyle	Home Park	19,500
Queens Park Rangers	Loftus Road	19,128
Gillingham	Priestfield Stadium	11,582
Crewe Alexandra	Alexandra Stadium	10,046
Brighton & Hove Albion	Withdean Stadium	8,850
Rotherham United	Millmoor	8,300

== Attendances ==
#	Club	Average
1	Leeds United	29,207
2	Sunderland	28,821
3	West Ham United	27,403
4	Wolverhampton Wanderers	26,620
5	Ipswich Town	25,651
6	Derby County	25,219
7	Leicester City	24,137
8	Nottingham Forest	23,565
9	Sheffield United	19,594
10	Reading	17,169
11	Stoke City	16,455
12	Plymouth Argyle	16,420
13	Queens Park Rangers	16,056
14	Coventry City	16,048
15	Watford	14,290
16	Preston North End	13,889
17	Cardiff City	12,976
18	Burnley	12,640
19	Millwall	11,656
20	Wigan Athletic	11,563
21	Gillingham	8,528
22	Crewe Alexandra	7,403
23	Brighton & Hove Albion	6,426
24	Rotherham United	6,272
