= Monson baronets =

Set index for Monson baronets

There have been two baronetcies created for members of the Monson family, one in the Baronetage of England and one in the Baronetage of the United Kingdom. One creation is extant as of 2026.

- Monson baronets of Carleton (1611: see Baron Monson
- Monson baronets of Thatched House Lodge (1905)
