= John Monson, 11th Baron Monson =

British hereditary peer

The Right Honourable The Lord Monson

Member of the House of Lords
- Lord Temporal
- Hereditary peerage 13 March 1961 – 11 November 1999
- Preceded by: The 10th Baron Monson
- Succeeded by: Seat abolished
- Elected Hereditary Peer; 11 November 1999 – 12 February 2011
- Election: 1999
- Preceded by: Seat established
- Succeeded by: The 5th Earl of Lytton

Personal details
- Born: 3 May 1932
- Died: 12 February 2011 (aged 78)
- Party: Crossbench
- Parents: John Monson; Bettie Northrup Powell
- Education: Eton College; Trinity College, Cambridge
- Occupation: Politician and peer

John Monson, 11th Baron Monson (3 May 1932 – 12 February 2011), was a British hereditary peer and crossbench member of the House of Lords. He was one of the ninety hereditary peers elected to remain in the House after the passing of the House of Lords Act 1999. He was a civil liberties campaigner and president of the Society for Individual Freedom.

== Background ==
The son of John Monson, 10th Baron Monson, and Bettie Northrup Powell, he was educated at Eton College in Berkshire and at Trinity College, Cambridge, where he graduated with a B.A. degree in 1954. In 1958 Monson succeeded to his father's barony.

Monson married Emma Devas, daughter of Anthony Devas and Nicolette Macnamara, on 2 April 1955. The couple had three sons, including Nicholas who succeeded him. Nicholas's son, Alexander, died while in police custody in Kenya in May 2012; according to a 2018 Kenyan court ruling, he was murdered by police.

== Notes ==
Peerage of Great Britain
Preceded by John Monson	Baron Monson; 1958–2011; Member of the House of Lords (1961–1999)	Succeeded by Nicholas Monson
Baronetage of England
Preceded by John Monson	Baronet of Carleton; 1958–2011	Succeeded by Nicholas Monson
Parliament of the United Kingdom
New office created by the House of Lords Act 1999	Elected hereditary peer to the House of Lords under the House of Lords Act 1999; 1999–2011	Succeeded by The Earl of Lytton
