= Ricky Jones =

Ricky Jones may refer to:

- Ricky Jones (baseball) (born 1958), baseball infielder
- Ricky Jones (American football) (born 1955), American football player
- Ricky Jones, politician acquitted of charges from the 2024 United Kingdom riots
- Ricky-Jade Jones (born 2002), football player

== See also ==
- Rickie Lee Jones (born 1954), American vocalist, musician, songwriter, and producer
- Rick Jones (disambiguation)
- Richard Jones (disambiguation)
