= The Individual =

Downloadable magazines

The Individual is the journal of the Society for Individual Freedom published in London, the United Kingdom. It was started in October 1976 as a newsletter under the title Newsletter of the Society for Individual Freedom. The magazine is published two or three times per year. Since 2002 Nigel Gervas Meek has served as the editor of the magazine. Paul Anderton is the former editor.
