= First Baptist Church (Roanoke, Virginia) =

Historic church in Virginia, US

- Formerly listed on the U.S. National Register of Historic Places
- Virginia Landmarks Register
- Location: 407 N. Jefferson St., NW, Roanoke, Virginia
- Area: less than one acre
- Built: 1898-1900
- Architect: Huggins, Henry Hartwell
- Architectural style: Romanesque, Gothic
- NRHP reference No.: 90001840
- VLR No.: 128-0037

Significant dates
- Added to NRHP: December 6, 1990
- Designated VLR: August 21, 1990
- Removed from NRHP: March 19, 2001
- Delisted VLR: March 19, 1997

First Baptist Church was a historic African-American Baptist church located in the Gainsboro neighborhood of Roanoke, Virginia. It was built in 1898–1900, and was a large six-bay nave-plan brick church with Romanesque and Gothic detailing. It featured a clipped gable roof and a front bell tower. A one-story Parish Hall was built in 1936. First Baptist Church occupied the building until moving to a new sanctuary in 1982. The church was destroyed by fire in April 1995.

The controversial Reverend Richard R. Jones was the first minister of the church, and guided it through the early stages of planning and construction between 1882 and 1904.

It was listed on the National Register of Historic Places in 1990 and delisted in 2001.
