= John Monson, 2nd Baron Monson =

British officeholder

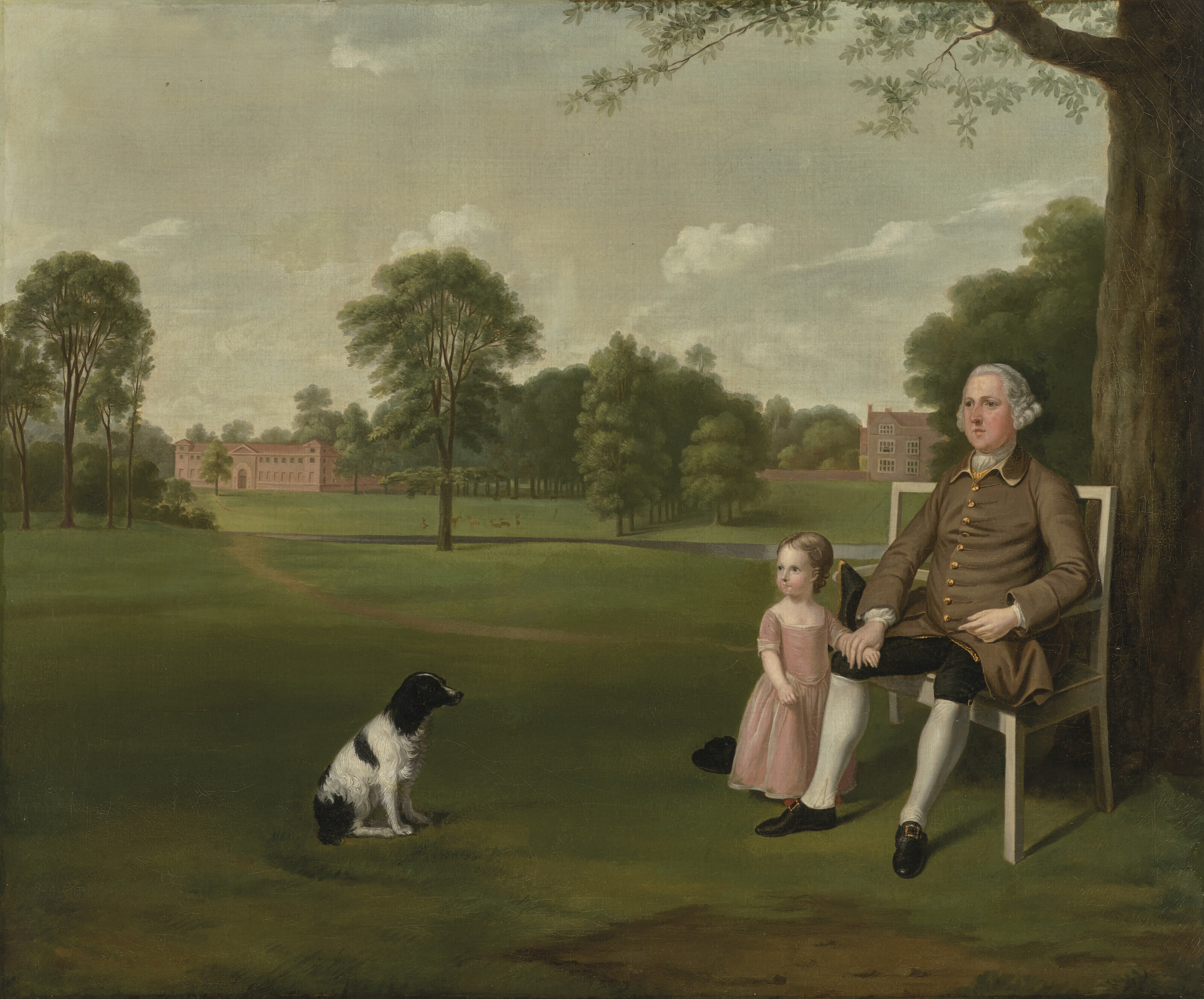
John, 2nd Lord Monson, and his eldest son, John, futur 3nd Lord Monson, in the grounds of Broxbornebury Park, Hertfordshire

John Monson, 2nd Baron Monson (23 July 1727 – 23 July 1774), was a British officeholder.

== Life ==
He was born on 23 July 1727, the eldest son of Sir John Monson, later Baron Monson, and his wife Margaret Watson, youngest daughter of Lewis Watson, 1st Earl of Rockingham. He was created LL.D. of Cambridge University in 1749.

On 5 November 1765, he was appointed warden and chief justice in eyre of the forests south of Trent. On the fall of the first Rockingham Ministry he was offered an earldom on the condition that he would relinquish the place; he declined the proposal. He ultimately resigned with Portland and other whigs on 27 November; but is mentioned by Walpole as subsequently voting with the court on Bedford's motion that the privy council should take notice of the action of the Massachusetts assembly in pardoning the late insurrection.

In 1768, he signed a protest against the bill to limit the dividends of the East India Company. Monson died at his house in Albemarle Street on 23 July 1774.

== Family ==
He married, on 23 June 1752, Theodosia, daughter of John Maddison, esq., of Harpswell, Lincolnshire, by whom he had five sons and two daughters. His sons George and Charles were cricketers.

- John Monson, 3rd Baron Monson (25 May 1753 – 14 November 1809).
- Katherina Monson (12 September 1754 – ?).
- George Henry Monson (17 October 1755 – 17 June 1823).
- Lieutenant-General Charles Monson (11 March 1758 – 11 January 1800).
- Charlotte Grace Monson (29 March 1759 – 19 July 1793).
- Colonel William Monson (15 December 1760 – 26 December 1807).
- Thomas John Monson (10 May 1764 – 3 April 1843)
- Theodosia Margaret Monson (? – 24 October 1847)

== Sources ==
- Kilburn, Matthew (2004). "Monson, John, first Baron Monson (1693?–1748)". Oxford Dictionary of National Biography. Oxford Dictionary of National Biography (online ed.). Oxford University Press. doi:10.1093/ref:odnb/18988. (Subscription, Wikipedia Library access or UK public library membership required.)

Peerage of Great Britain
Preceded by John Monson	Baron Monson; 1748–1774	Succeeded by John Monson
Baronetage of England
Preceded by John Monson	Baronet (of Carleton); 1748–1774	Succeeded by John Monson
