= Battle of Mukandwara Pass =

1804 battle of the Second Anglo-Maratha War

Coordinates: 24°48′19″N 75°59′37″E

Battle of Mukundara Pass
- Part of the Second Anglo-Maratha War
Date	8–10 July 1804 (2 days)
Location	Kotah, Rajasthan, India
Result	Maratha victory

Belligerents
Maratha Empire: Indore State	(United Kingdom of Great Britain and Ireland) British Empire: East India Company; Kota State

Commanders and leaders
Yaswantrao Holkar; Wahid Ali Khan; Bakshi Shankar	(East India Company) William Monson; Amar Sing †; Afsal Khan †; Akbayram Pachali (POW); Fais Khan (POW)

Strength
6,000	4,000

Casualties and losses
300 killed	400 to 500 men killed or captured

The Battle of Mukandwara Pass, also known as the Battle of Mokandra Pass or Monson's Retreat, was fought from 8 to 10 July 1804 between forces of the Indore Maharaja Yashwantrao Holkar, a member of the Maratha Confederacy and British East India Company forces under Colonel William Monson supported by Kotah kingdom during the Second Anglo-Maratha War. It was fought just to the south of the Mukandwara Pass, about 50 kilometres (31 mi). Monson, having overextended his supply line, was retreating toward Kotah when Holkar's forces decimated his rear guard on 10 July. Monson reached Kotah on 12 July, but was forced to abandon his guns in the mud at the Chambal River on the 15th. Holkar continued to harass Monson's force, which reached Kushalgarh on 25 Aug. Monson's men were then in a panic as they barely made it to Bayana.

"Monson's loss had been heavy. 12 British officers had been killed, 2 were drowned and 2 were missing. 5 other officers were wounded. Half of the 5 battalions had been lost. Monson's retreat shook British military reputation and prestige to the core."
