= Battle of Deeg =

1804 battle of the Second Anglo-Maratha War

- Part of the Second Anglo-Maratha War
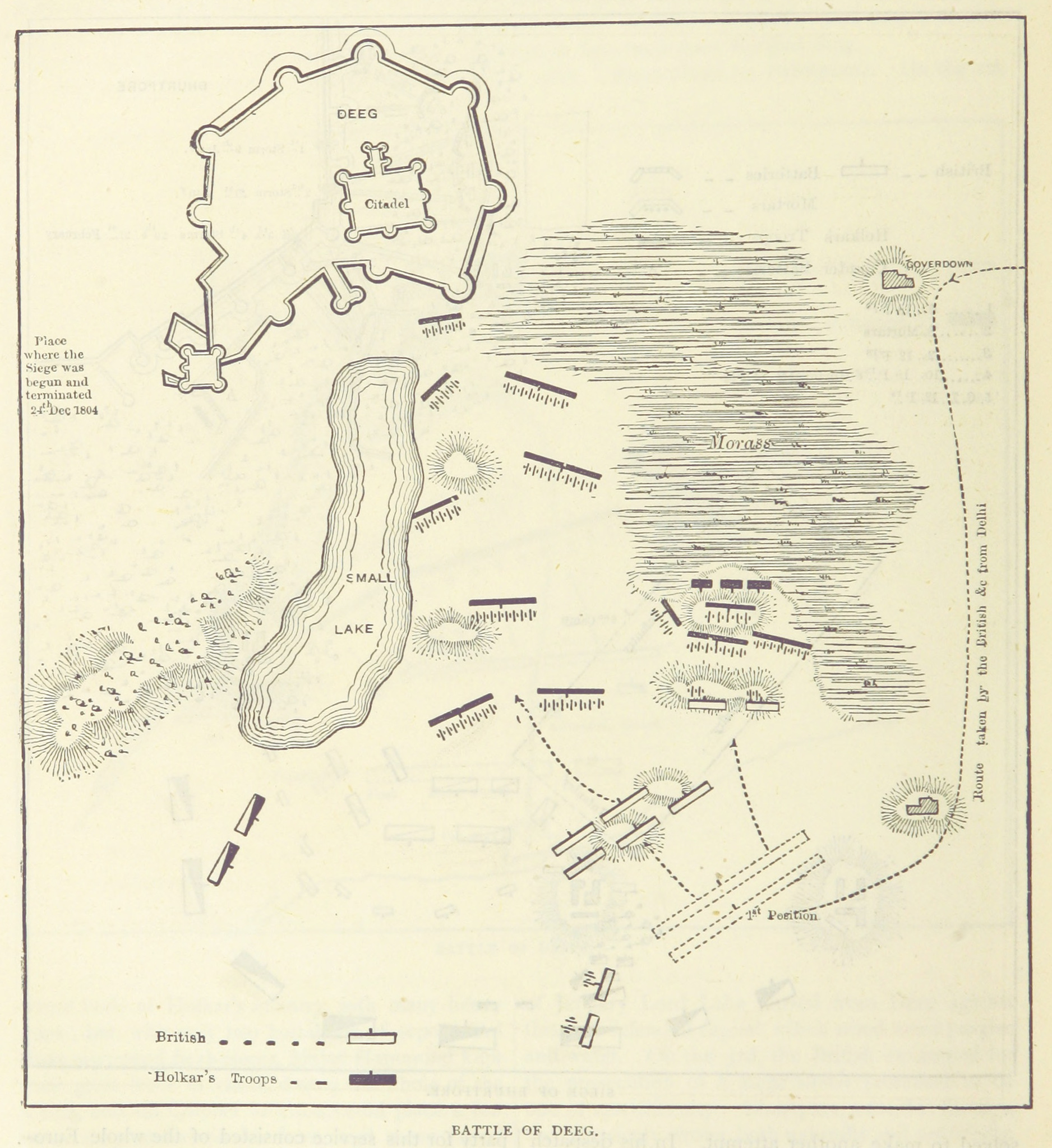
- A map of the battle
| Date | 13 November 1804 |
| Location | Deeg, Rajasthan, India 27°27′20″N 77°20′15″E |
| Result | British victory |

Belligerents
| (United Kingdom of Great Britain and Ireland) British Empire: East India Company | Maratha Empire: Indore State; Bharatpur State |

Commanders and leaders
| (United Kingdom of Great Britain and Ireland) John Fraser † (United Kingdom of Great Britain and Ireland) William Monson | Jaswantrao Holkar; Ranjit Singh |

Strength
| 900 men 13 guns | >3,000 men 160 guns |

Casualties and losses
| 643 killed or wounded | ~2,000 killed or wounded 87 guns captured |

The Battle of Deeg, fought on 13 November 1804, took place outside Deeg, now in the Bharatpur district of Rajasthan, India. A force of the British East India Company led by Major General John Henry Fraser defeated a Maratha force under Yashwantrao Holkar and a force of Hindu Jats led by Maharaja Ranjit Singh. Fraser was himself mortally wounded in the attack. The British captured about 87 guns of the enemy's 160. British casualties were 643 killed or wounded. Maratha casualties were estimated at over 2,000.

"The British loss was heavy - 643 killed and wounded", including General Fraser.

The action was followed up by a Siege of Deeg Fort (11 – 24 December 1804).

== In fiction ==
- The battle and ensuing siege (together with statistics culled from Duff) are briefly described in G.A.Henty's 1902 book, At the Point of the Bayonet: A Tale of the Mahratta War
