= George Monson (cricketer) =

English cricketer

The Honourable Sir George Henry Monson (17 October 1755 – 17 June 1823) was a noted English amateur cricketer whose known career included 10 matches from the 1786 to the 1792 season. Monson, who was a useful batsman, was a member of Hornchurch Cricket Club and Marylebone Cricket Club.

Monson was the second son of John Monson, 2nd Baron Monson, and elder brother of Lieutenant-General Charles Monson.

== External sources ==
- Hon. GH Monson in Cricket Archive
