= Richard Jones (footballer, born 1878) =

Welsh footballer

Personal information
- Date of birth: 1878
- Place of birth: Wales
- Date of death: 1938 (aged 59–60)

Senior career*
Years	Team	Apps	(Gls)
- Druids

International career
1900	Wales	2	(0)
- * Club domestic league appearances and goals

Richard Jones (1878 – 1938) was a Welsh international footballer. He was part of the Wales national football team, playing 2 matches. He played his first match on 3 February 1900 against Scotland and his last match on 24 February 1900 against Ireland. At club level, he played for Druids.

== See also ==
- List of Wales international footballers (alphabetical)
