= Richard Bathoe Jones =

Richard Bathoe Jones (8 September 1830 – 15 October 1916) was an Anglican priest in Ireland.

He was born in County Cork and educated at Trinity College, Dublin. He held curacies at Broadford, O'Brien's Bridge and Killaloe; and incumbencies at Sixmilebridge, Templeharry, Ballymackey and Roscrea. He was Archdeacon of Killaloe from 1888.
