= Society for Individual Freedom =

UK-based association

The Society for Individual Freedom (SIF) is a United Kingdom-based association of libertarians, classical liberals, free-market conservatives and others promoting individual freedom. It has links to the British intelligence community.

== Early years ==
The website of the Society states that "The Society of Individualists was founded in 1942, with many of its leaders and supporters, including its first president Sir Ernest Benn, drawn from those associated with the remnant individualist wing of the Liberal Party. In 1944 the Society of Individualists merged with the National League for Freedom, which itself had been formed from those associated with the explicitly anti-socialist wing of the Conservative Party. The Society for Individual Freedom took on its present name in 1947".

== 1960s onwards ==
George Kennedy Young became president sometime after his departure from MI6 in 1961. Other notable officers include its chairman, Professor Peter Walter Campbell, founder of the Dept of Politics at Reading and founding chairman of the Conservative Group for Homosexual Equality (CGHE – LBGT). Gerald Howarth, later a Conservative MP, served as the organisation's General Secretary from 1969 to 1971.

In 1967 the Young Libertarians, the youth organisation of SIF, broke off to create the Libertarian Alliance. There was an overlap of members and officers between the LA and the SIF.

The SIF is independent of all political parties and relies entirely on voluntary subscriptions and donations.

The SIF advocates personal freedom and less state control generally (e.g. it is opposed to censorship and identity cards), and a genuinely free enterprise economy including low taxation and no state subsidies to industry. Its membership tends to be strongly Eurosceptic.

The SIF campaigned for the institution of the UK's Parliamentary Ombudsman beginning in 1959, and in 1961, published the first English language book on such institutions, Occasion for Ombudsman: Is a Grievance Man Necessary for Britain?, by journalist T. E. Utley. The campaign for the Ombudsman system – for an unelected adjudicator to help prevent bureaucratic maladministration – eventually succeeded. In 1967 the Parliamentary Commissioner for Administration was instituted.

In 1975 its chairman became John Monson, 11th Baron Monson, a position he kept for the next 35 years. Monson's most controversial campaign was against compulsory use of seat belts which eventually failed but led to accusations of irresponsibility.

In 1994 the SIF published The Power to Destroy, a study of the British tax system, by Professor D. R. Myddelton.

== Links to British intelligence ==
In his 1981 book, former counter-terrorism operative Gordon Winter of the South African Bureau of State Security recalls a briefing with his London-based handler, Alf Bouwer, describing the Society as a British intelligence "front" for "disseminating Establishment-type propaganda", namely opposition to the free immigration of black people to Britain. He was informed that there were two intelligence officers operating within the organisation, former president George Kennedy Young and broadcaster Ross McWhirter, the latter being murdered by the IRA in 1975.

== Current activities ==
The Society for Individual Freedom regularly offers public meetings with notable speakers, and holds occasional luncheons at the Houses of Parliament.

The SIF has two related campaigns. Tell-IT calls for information technology to be used to provide information on outcomes of drugs and treatments and to make them known and available to both doctors and patients. Choice in Personal Safety (CIPS) campaigns against compulsion in seatbelt laws and other related matters.

The SIF also publishes a journal, The Individual.

They are a member of Backlash, which was formed in 2005 in order to oppose a new law criminalising possession of "extreme pornography".
