= Rich Jones =

Rich Jones may refer to:

- Rich Jones (musician) (born 1973), English guitarist
- Rich Jones (basketball) (born 1946), retired American basketball player
- Rich Jones (sprinter) (born 1973), Guyanese Olympic sprinter

== See also ==
- Ritchie Jones (born 1986), footballer
- Richard Jones (disambiguation)
