= Richard Jones (East India Company officer) =

British general and politician (1754–1835)

Lieutenant-General Sir Richard Jones, KCB (1754–1835) enlisted in the Bombay Army in 1770, commanded 4 companies of artillery in Third Anglo-Mysore War during 1790–1792, commanded the Bombay army detachment at Siege of Bharatpur (1805), commanding officer at Surat 1805–8, commander in chief in Bombay in 1808, commander of artillery 1808–16. Was made Knight Commander of the Order of the Bath for his actions at Bharatpur.
