= Frank Eaton (footballer) =

English footballer (1902–1979)

Personal information
- Full name: Frank Eaton
- Date of birth: 12 November 1902
- Place of birth: Stockport, England
- Date of death: 1979 (aged 76–77)
- Position: Inside forward

Senior career*
Years	Team	Apps	(Gls)
1922–1923	Cressbrook		
1923–1924	Oldham Athletic	0	(0)
1924–1925	New Mills		
1925–1930	Barnsley	150	(59)
1930–1933	Reading	101	(31)
1933–1934	Queens Park Rangers	15	(2)
Total		266	(92)
- * Club domestic league appearances and goals

Frank Eaton (12 November 1902 – 1979) was an English footballer who played in the Football League for Barnsley, Queens Park Rangers and Reading.
