= Richard Jones (doctor) =

Australian medical doctor

Richard Jones is an Australian retired medical doctor. A former director at the Department of Rehabilitation Medicine and Clinical Director of the Spinal Injuries Unit at Prince Henry and Prince of Wales hospitals, he established the Post Polio clinic at these hospitals. He was Associate Professor of the School of Community Medicine at the University of New South Wales, Sydney. He served as the medical officer and team leader for Australian teams at the 1976 Toronto and 1980 Arnhem Paralympics. He was also as medical officer and member of the Medical Science Committee at the FESPIC Games.

== Career ==
Jones graduated in medicine from the University of Sydney in 1963 and spent his resident years at the Prince Henry and Prince of Wales Hospitals, Sydney He continued his Post Graduate studies at the Institute of Basic Medical Sciences, part of the Royal College of Surgeons of England, gaining further knowledge and experience in hospitals in the UK until 1968. On his return to Prince Henry hospital that same year, he was appointed Senior Surgical Registrar in the Professorial Unit. In 1969, he was appointed Specialist in Rehabilitation Medicine at both Prince Henry and Prince of Wales hospitals and Deputy Director of the Department, as well as Clinical Director of the Spinal Injuries Unit in 1974.

The rehabilitation unit established at the Prince of Wales hospital between 1955 and 1960 included a Paraplegic Ward, due to many patients being severely impaired and needing extended rehabilitation because of the severe Polio epidemic. Jones was the driving force behind the establishment of the Post-Polio Clinic at Prince Henry hospital, the patients with spinal cord injuries being transferred from the Prince of Wales Hospital, Sydney in 1965.

George Burniston, the first Director of Rehabilitation Medicine at Prince Henry and Prince of Wales hospitals, influenced Jones; they established a rehabilitation service for amputees, for spinal injured patients and later for stroke patients. Jones together with his colleagues Doctor John Baggott and Professor Ben Marosszeky set up the first regular clinical meetings at the Prince of Wales hospital, later known as the Registrar Training Programme.

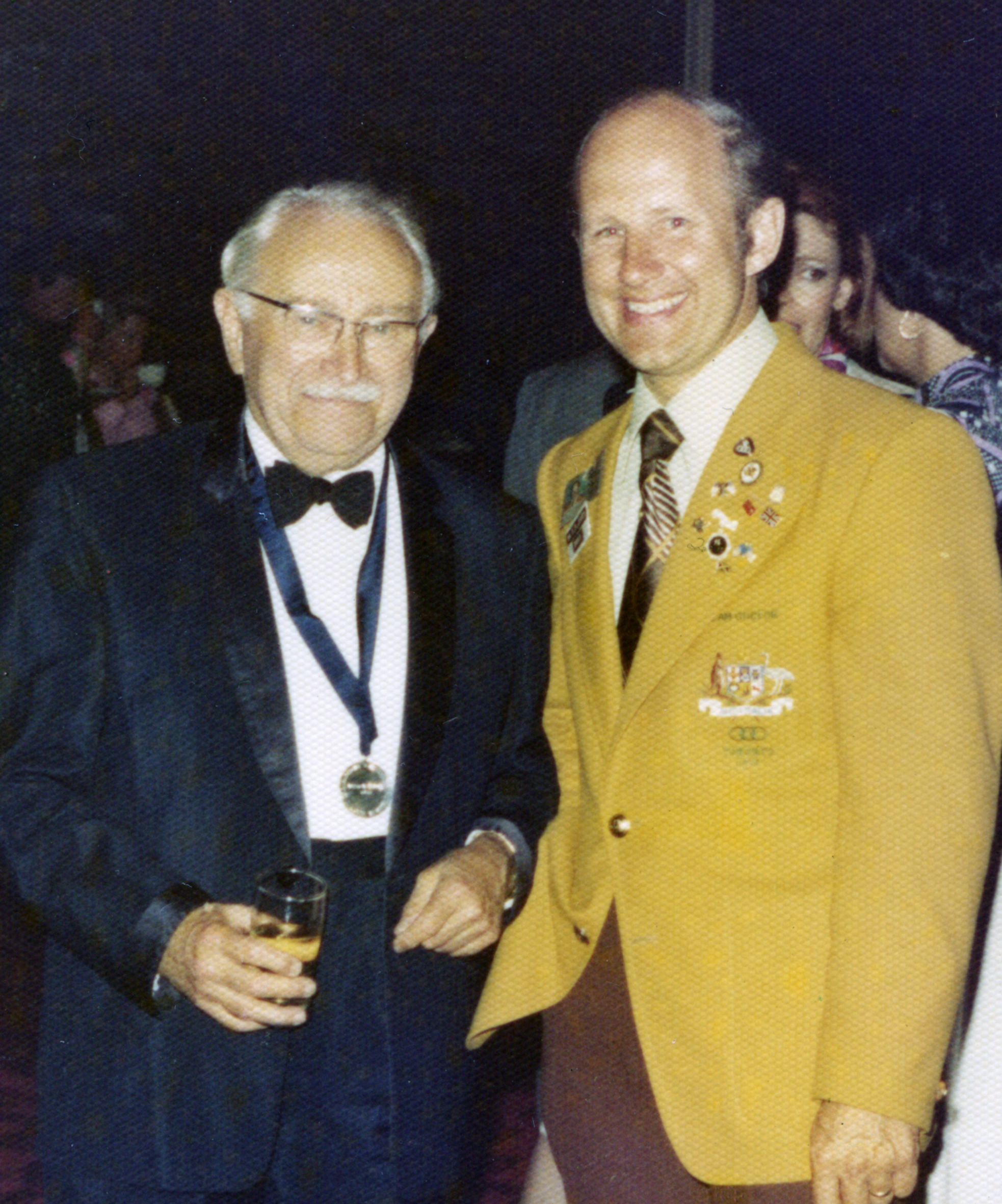
Paralympic movement founder Ludwig Guttmann with Australian Team official Richard Jones at a function during the 1976 Toronto Paralympic Games

Jones felt that social rehabilitation was the next step in saving the lives of paraplegics. From 1972 to 1997 he was a Director of the Paraplegic and Quadriplegic Association of New South Wales, the key goals being to lobby for a specialized Spinal Injuries Unit of which he was a Director, and accommodation for people with severe spinal cord injuries. In addition, Jones was a member of the Hostel, Welfare and Workshop Sub Committees of this association and a doner as well.

Jones' first experiences as team doctor were at the National Titles in 1973, the 1974 Commonwealth Paraplegic Games, and the 1976 Toronto Paralympics. To ease the burden of financial difficulties for New South Wales wheelchair athletes competing at the 1976 Games, Doctor Jones raised $1400 towards his own expenses. Jones who was at the time Clinical Director of the Spinal Injuries unit, Prince Henry Hospital Sydney, organised and participated in a 'wheelathon' in the Sutherland Shire of Sydney and raised $400.00 towards the cost of sending Indigenous Australian Paralympian Ray Barrett (athlete) to the Stoke Mandeville Games in England.

Appointed team doctor at the 1977 FESPIC Games, Parramatta NSW the first multi-diagnostic Games held in Australia, Jones was assigned to care for amputee athletes, who formed the Australian Amputee Sporting Association during the Games, as no such organization had previously existed. He was Team Leader and Medical Officer for the Australian Team at the 1980 Arnhem Games.

Jones was a member of the Medical Committee for the 1989 FESPIC Games in Kobe, Japan. At his retirement function held on 8 November 2001 to celebrate 38 years of service, Stella Engel, Director of Rehabilitation and Spinal Medicine at Prince Henry hospital in her presentation speech said "Professor Jones was one of the pioneers of rehabilitation medicine in NSW. ..........he was one of the founding fathers of the College of Rehabilitation Medicine".

In a 2013 interview, Australian comedian Adam Hills credited Jones for being able to walk on one leg.
