= Richard R. Jones =

The Reverend Richard R. Jones (1853 – 1921) was a noted African-American Baptist minister, civil rights activist and orator in Roanoke, Virginia.

== Early life ==
Richard Jones was born into slavery to William and Mary Jones, who were both owned by Matthew Pedigue of Botetourt County, Virginia. After the Civil War, he went to West Virginia, where he experienced a religious conversion and a call to preach. He returned to Virginia and was baptized in Bedford County, Virginia; he entered public school there to learn how to read. While in Bedford County, he preached at the Bunker Hill Baptist Church, and the Western Light Baptist Church and the Shady Grove Baptist Church, and to found the Piney Grove Baptist Church.

In 1884 he married Lelia Leftwich of Bedford County.

== First Baptist Church ==
In 1882 he moved to Roanoke to help start the First Baptist Church. An aggressive and passionate speaker, he worked with the congregation to raise funds for the church building and parsonage, and became its first pastor.

"Born a slave in 1853, Reverend Richard R. Jones came to Roanoke in 1882 to head First Baptist Church. When completed in 1903 under exacting direction of Rev. Jones, the new First Baptist Church housed the largest black congregation west of Richmond. In 1901, the Roanoke Times condemned the outspoken ministry of Rev. Jones for disrupting 'essential harmony between blacks and whites.' In 1904, a white mob of men and boys forced Rev. Jones to flee Roanoke, never to return."

== Exile and death ==
When a white woman in Roanoke was attacked by a black man, tensions ran high. After Jones preached that whites were not superior to blacks a large mob of whites attacked his home on February 5, 1904, threatening him and his family. Forced out of his home in Roanoke, Virginia, he fled by train to Washington, DC, then to Homestead, Pennsylvania. There he began a US$50,000 lawsuit against the town of Roanoke and the city police; however he was unable to pay a bond to bear the cost of the case should he lose, and his suit was dismissed.

He lived in Homestead for the rest of his life, and is buried in the Homestead Cemetery in Pittsburgh, Pennsylvania. His wife, who died in 1934, is buried next to him.
