= Richard Jones (actor) =

English actor and dramatist

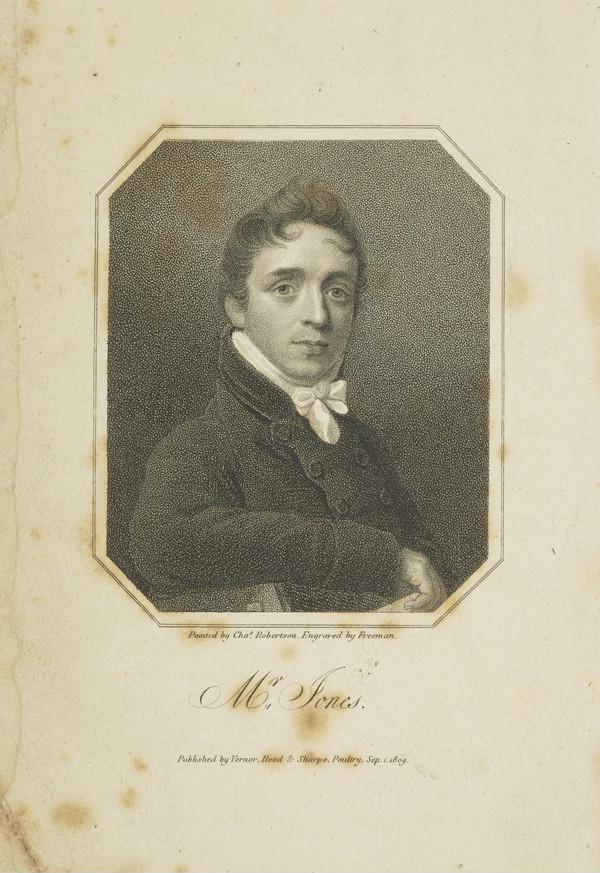
- Jones by Samuel Freeman after Charles Robertson
- Born: 1779; Birmingham
- Died: 30 August 1851 (aged 71–72)
- Occupations: Actor and dramatist

Richard Jones (1779 – 30 August 1851), known as "Gentleman Jones", was an English actor and dramatist.

== Biography ==
Jones was the son of a builder and surveyor in Birmingham, where he was born in 1779. He was educated as an architect. Beginning as an amateur, he was induced by the pecuniary difficulties of his father to adopt the stage as a profession, and played Romeo, Norval, Hamlet, &c., at Lichfield, Newcastle, and Bolton. After a season at Birmingham he went to Manchester, and through the indisposition of Ward took at short notice the part of Gossamer in Frederick Reynolds's ‘Laugh when you can.’ This was a success, and commended the actor to Frederick Edward Jones, the patentee of the Crow Street Theatre in Dublin, at which house he appeared on 20 November 1799. In Ireland he remained playing in all the principal towns, until he came to London to Covent Garden, at which house he appeared on 9 October 1807 as Goldfinch in the ‘Road to Ruin’ and Frederick in ‘Of Age To-morrow,’ an entertainment by Thomas Dibdin, with music by Michael Kelly. His reception was unfavourable, and he was, not without justice, denounced as an imitator of ‘Gentleman Lewis’. He played, however, steadily and conscientiously. Gingham in Reynolds's ‘The Rage,’ first taken by Lewis, was his third part, and he was on 17 November 1807 the original Count Ignacio in T. Dibdin's ‘Two Faces under one Hood.’ Dick in the ‘Confederacy,’ Bob Handy in ‘Speed the Plough,’ Belcour in the ‘West Indian,’ and Tangent in the ‘Way to get Married,’ were among the rôles taken during his first season. Sir George in the ‘Busybody,’ Baron Wildenhaim in ‘Lovers' Vows,’ Puff in the ‘Critic,’ followed in the season of 1808–9, when, after the fire at Covent Garden, the company migrated to the Haymarket Opera House, and subsequently, 3 December, to the Haymarket Theatre. The disappearance in 1809 from the London stage of Lewis, his predecessor and model, left the light-comedy parts at Jones's disposal. On 5 June 1809 he made at the Haymarket what seems to have been his first appearance as a member of that company, playing the Copper Captain in ‘Rule a Wife and have a Wife,’ one of the most famous of Lewis's rôles; for this performance Jones was strongly censured. Jeremy Diddler in Raising the Wind, Rolando in the ‘Honeymoon,’ Rover in ‘Wild Oats,’ Captain Beldare in ‘Love laughs at Locksmiths,’ Wilford in the ‘Iron Chest,’ Sir Charles Racket in ‘Three Weeks after Marriage,’ show how wide a range was now assigned him.

Jones resolutely faced opposition, and developed into one of the most popular of comedians. His attempts at dramatic authorship were not very successful. The authorship of the ‘Green Man,’ a play in three acts, produced at the Haymarket 15 Aug. 1818, with Terry as Mr. Green, Jones as Crackley, and Mrs. Gibbs and Mrs. Julia Glover in the principal female characters, was claimed by him, but did not pass undisputed; while ‘Too Late for Dinner,’ which was produced at Covent Garden, 22 February 1820, and is said on its title-page to be ‘by Richard Jones, Esquire,’ was assigned to Theodore Hook. This piece is an adaptation of ‘Les Deux Philibert’ of Picard (Odéon, 10 August 1816). Jones played in it Frank Poppleton, a dashing young man. He wrote also the ‘School for Gallantry,’ a one-act piece, apparently unprinted, in which he played Colonel Morrsfelt; and was author, in conjunction with Theodore Hook, of a piece called ‘Hoaxing.’ An entertainment called a ‘Carnival,’ in which he appeared for his benefit, was a failure. At the close the audience called for an apology, which, as Jones had gone to bed, was promised by Fawcett and subsequently made. On 3 June 1833, after a benefit, not announced as a farewell, in which he played Young Contrast and Alfred Highflyer, and received the assistance of Taglioni and Malibran, he took an unostentatious leave of the stage, and gave thenceforward lessons in elocution. He died on 30 August 1851, and was buried in St. Peter's Church, Pimlico. A memorial tablet in the wall of the church records his virtues, and states that he was for over forty years an inhabitant of the parish. In the same grave are his sister Eliza (d. 29 November 1828, aged 40) and Sarah, his wife, who died 18 June 1850, aged 71.

Jones was an exceptionally worthy, temperate, and respected man. He was something of a valetudinarian, lived a comparatively secluded life, but was friendly with his associates, and was sought after in literary society. On the stage he was admirable as an eccentric gentleman, a dashing beau, and as the hero of a madcap farce stood alone. Recklessness on the stage marred his representation of fine gentlemen. His laugh was loud, but somewhat forced, and his acting generally wanted repose. He was the best dressed actor on the stage, and was a gentleman in his manner. His namesake and manager in Dublin, Frederick Edward Jones, in some well-known verses, noted, at the outset of his career, faults in his style, which were never quite overcome.

A portrait of Jones by Burnell, a second by De Wilde, showing him as Young Contrast in Burgoyne's ‘Lord of the Manor,’ and a third, also by De Wilde, exhibiting him as Jeremy Diddler in ‘Raising the Wind,’ are in the Mathews collection in the Garrick Club. Likenesses of him have been published as Puff, Alfred Highflyer, Archer, Flutter in ‘Belle's Stratagem,’ and other characters.
