= 1792 English cricket season =

Cricket season review

In the 1792 English cricket season, Kent played Hampshire at Cobham Park, which was Lord Darnley's estate and the home of the Bligh family. Ninety years later, it became the home of The Ashes in the shape of the urn brought back from Australia by the Hon. Ivo Bligh. Details of 24 historically important eleven-a-side matches are known. (Note: Any match listed in the ACS' Important Match Guide (1981) is historically important, and therefore of the highest standard, whether or not a scorecard might exist. The same applies to numerous matches discovered by researchers since 1981. For further information, see First-class cricket.)

A match in Sheffield provides the earliest known instance of the rare dismissal of obstructing the field. Elsewhere, the earliest known cricket club in India was formed in Calcutta.

== Matches ==
Among the higher quality matches this year, Marylebone Cricket Club (MCC) played Sussex twice. Sussex won the first match at Lord's Old Ground (Lord's) by 9 wickets. The return was played on the Prince of Wales Ground, in Brighton, where Sussex won by 3 wickets. This venue had its name changed over the years and was known as Box's Ground in the 19th century.

In June, England (i.e., the "rest" of England) played Kent at Lord's and won by 10 runs.

Hampshire had two matches against Kent, one against Surrey, and one against England. They lost to Surrey by 109 runs, but won the other three. They won by 127 runs against England on Windmill Down, and twice defeated Kent away from home.

On 2–4 August, Berkshire defeated MCC by 10 runs. Thomas Lord played for MCC, and was involved in at least nine Berkshire dismissals. Also in August, Hampshire won by 8 wickets at Cobham Park, near Gravesend. Cobham Park was Lord Darnley's estate and the home of the Bligh family. Ninety years later, it became the home of The Ashes, in the shape of the urn brought back from Australia by the Hon. Ivo Bligh. In September, Hampshire defeated Kent by an innings and 23 runs on Dartford Brent.

== Other events ==
In May, MCC played two matches against Middlesex, both on Lord's Old Ground. MCC won the first by 274 runs, and Middlesex the second by 5 runs.

== Bibliography ==
- ACS (1981). A Guide to Important Cricket Matches Played in the British Isles 1709–1863. Nottingham: ACS. OCLC 85045528.
- Haygarth, Arthur (1996) [1862]. Scores & Biographies, Volume 1 (1744–1826). Kennington: Frederick Lillywhite. ISBN 978-19-00592-23-9.
- Warner, Pelham (1946). Lords: 1787–1945. London: Harrap. OCLC 877106024.
