= Dickie Jones (footballer, born 1874) =

English footballer

Personal information
- Full name: Richard Jones
- Date of birth: 1874
- Place of birth: Liverpool, England
- Position: Winger

Senior career*
Years	Team	Apps	(Gls)
1897–1898	Liverpool White Star		
1898–1899	Barnsley	30	(10)
1899–1900	Glossop	7	(0)
1900–1902	Barnsley	34	(9)
Total		71	(19)
- * Club domestic league appearances and goals

Richard Jones (1874–unknown) was an English footballer who played in the Football League for Barnsley and Glossop.
