= Siege of Deeg =

- Part of the Second Anglo-Maratha War
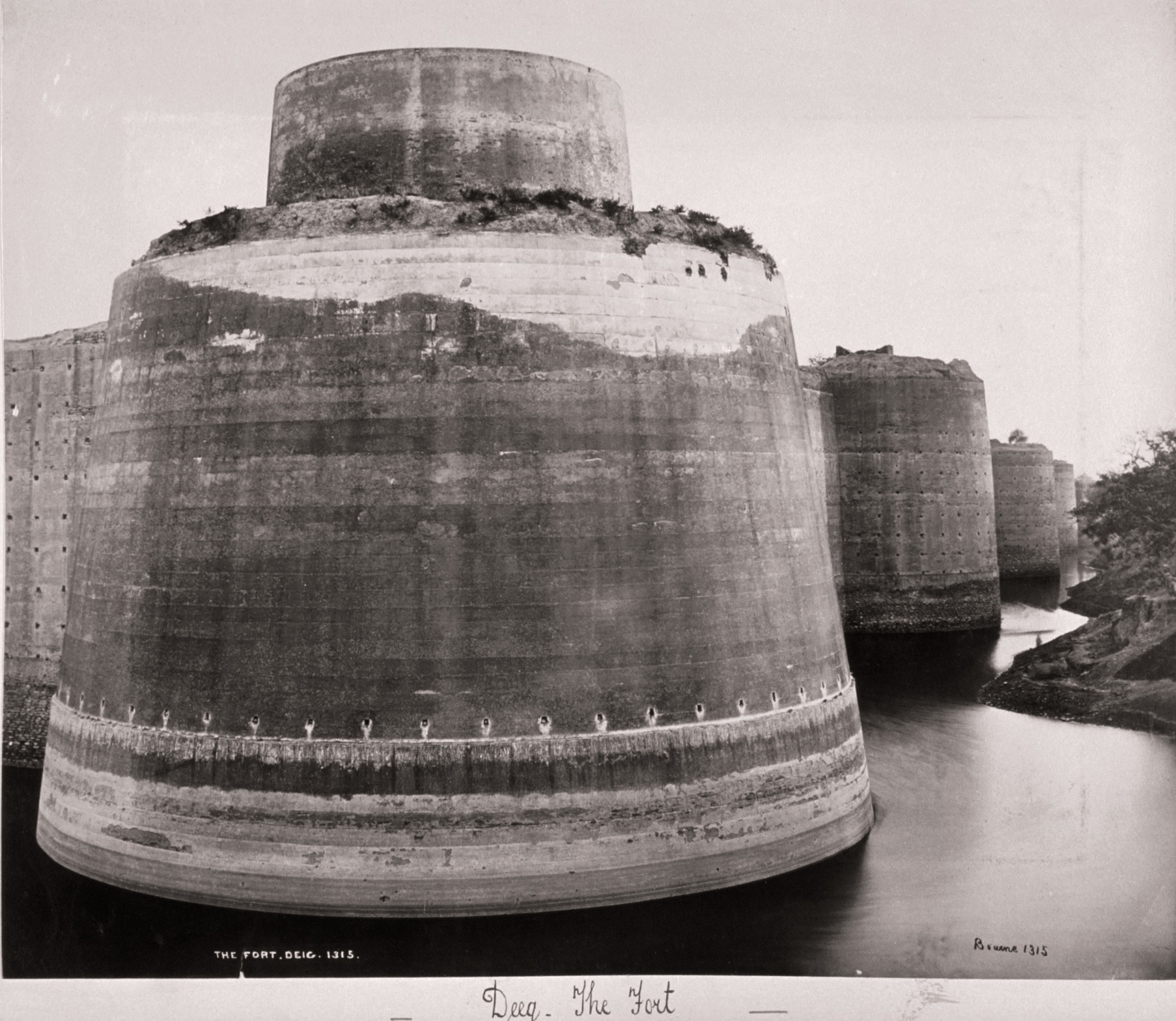
Date	11–24 December, 1804 (1 week, 6 days)
Location	Deeg, Rajasthan, India 27.47°N 77.33°E
Result	British victory
Territorial changes	British troops capture Deeg Fort

Belligerents
British Empire: East India Company	Maratha Empire: Indore State; Bharatpur State

Commanders and leaders
Gerard Lake	Jaswantrao Holkar; Ranjit Singh

Strength
3,757 men 39 guns	1,869 men 73 guns

Casualties and losses
192 killed 35 wounded 6 guns destroyed	300 killed 156 wounded 62 guns captured

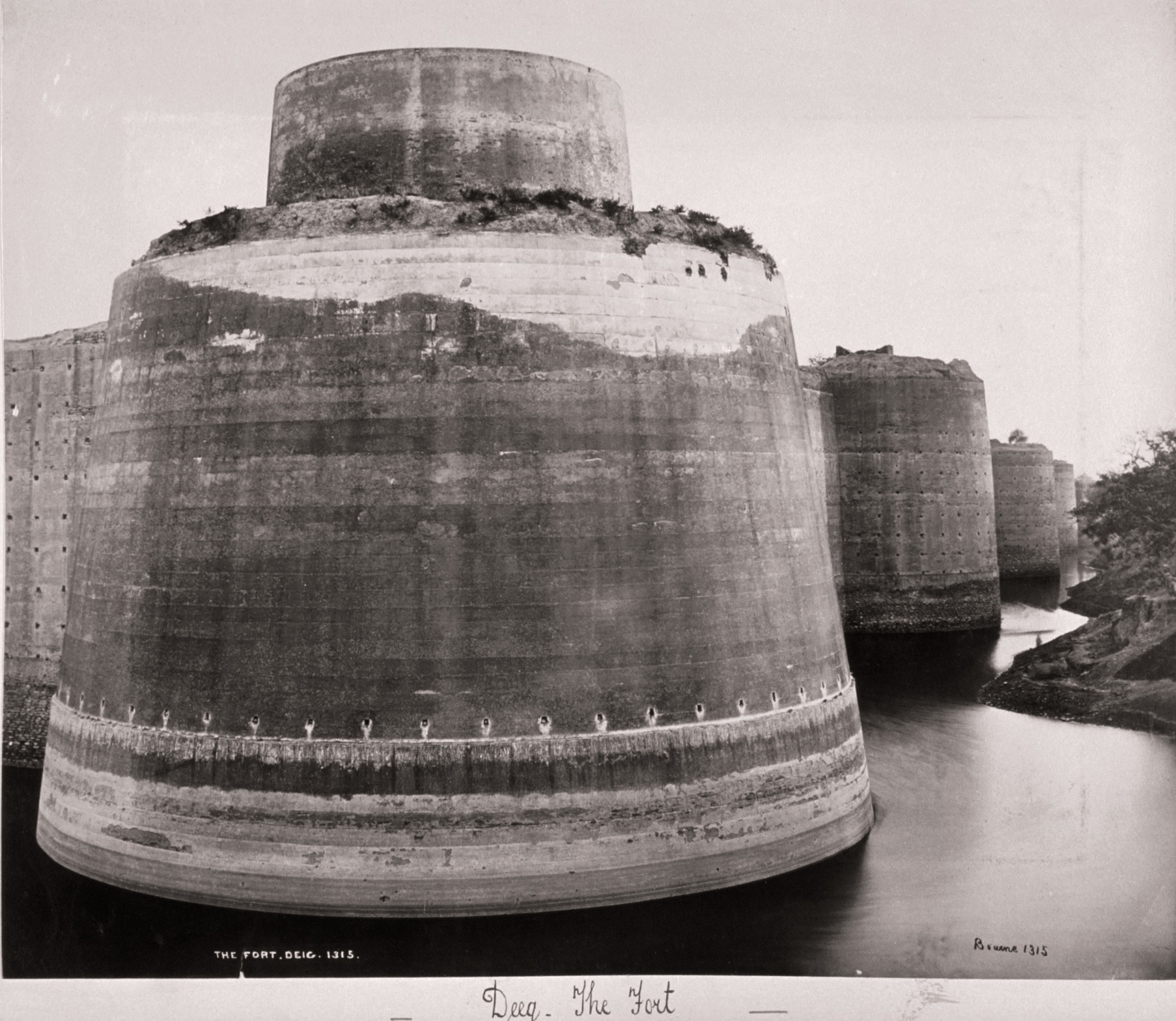
c. 1865-June 1866 photograph of the Deeg fort by Samuel Bourne

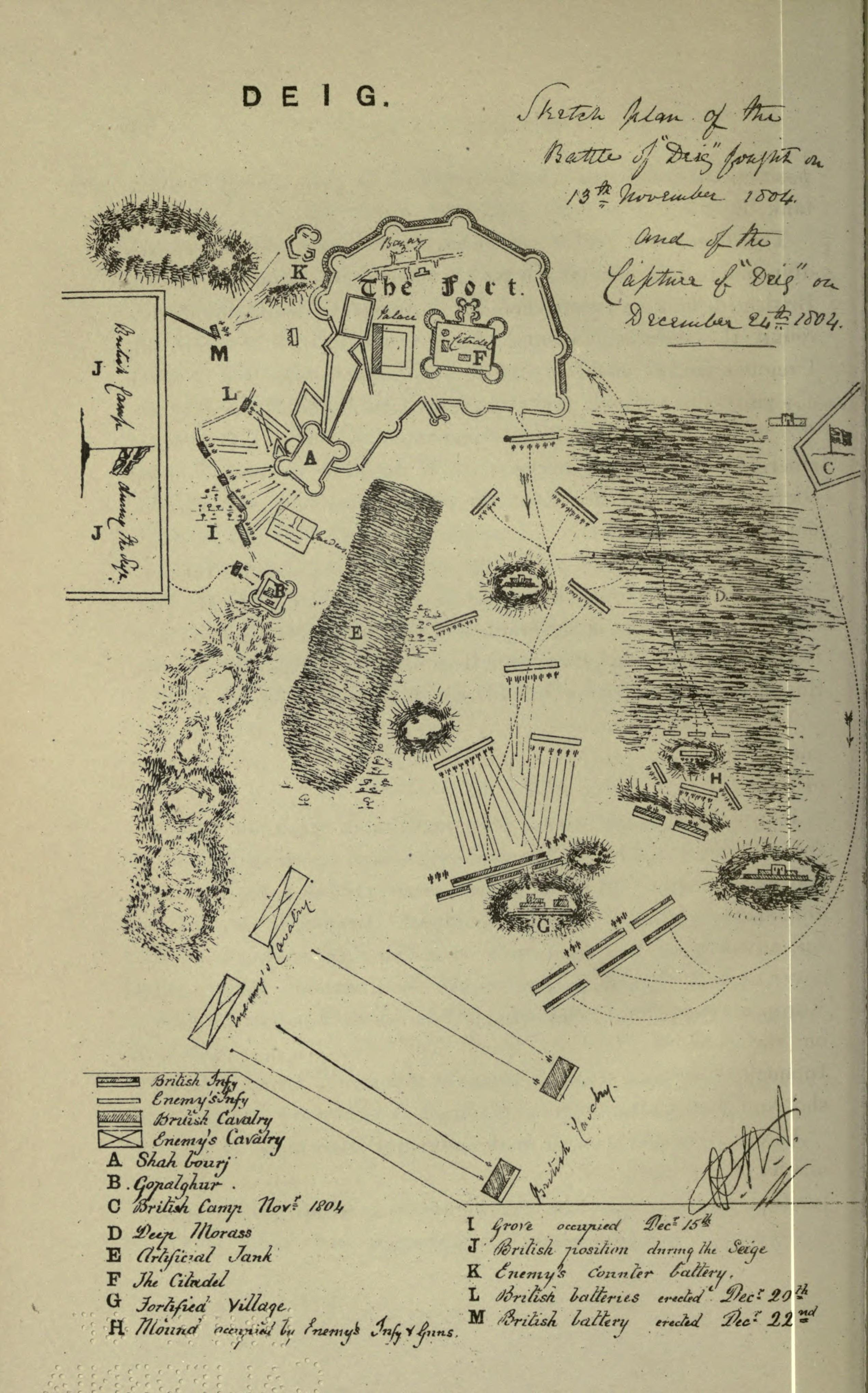
Operations against Fortress of Deig, 1804

The siege of Deeg (11–24 December 1804) was a siege of the main fort at Deeg, now in the Bharatpur district of Rajasthan, India, then within the Bharatpur Kingdom. Forces of the British East India Company, led by General Lake, captured the fort from its Marathan defenders.

The siege started on 20 November, the bombardment on 13 December, and a breach made at Shahburz, a salient on the southwest side of the fort, on 23 December. A three-pronged attack took place that night and the Marathas retreated to Bharatpur on the 24th. The British suffered 227 casualties.

== See also ==
- Battle of Deeg
