= Charles Monson =

English cricketer and British Army officer

Personal information
- Born: 11 March 1758; England
- Died: 11 January 1800 (aged 41)

Major-General Charles Monson (11 March 1758 – 11 January 1800) was a British Army officer and cricketer who played club matches during the 1780s for the White Conduit Club.

Monson was the third son of John Monson, 2nd Baron Monson. He was the younger brother of cricketer George Monson and was an officer in the British Army.

Monson is recorded only once playing any form of cricket, a match for White Conduit against Kent at White Conduit Fields in June 1785. He had an outstanding game as a bowler, taking five wickets (all bowled) in the first innings and enabling his team to win by 304 runs. He scored 29 and 7 with the bat and took six wickets altogether with one catch.

He later rose to the rank of major-general before his death in 1800.

== Bibliography ==
- Haygarth, Arthur (1862). Scores & Biographies, Volume 1 (1744–1826). Lillywhite.
