= John of Gaunt's Palace, Lincoln =

Historic site in Lincoln, England

John of Gaunt's Palace
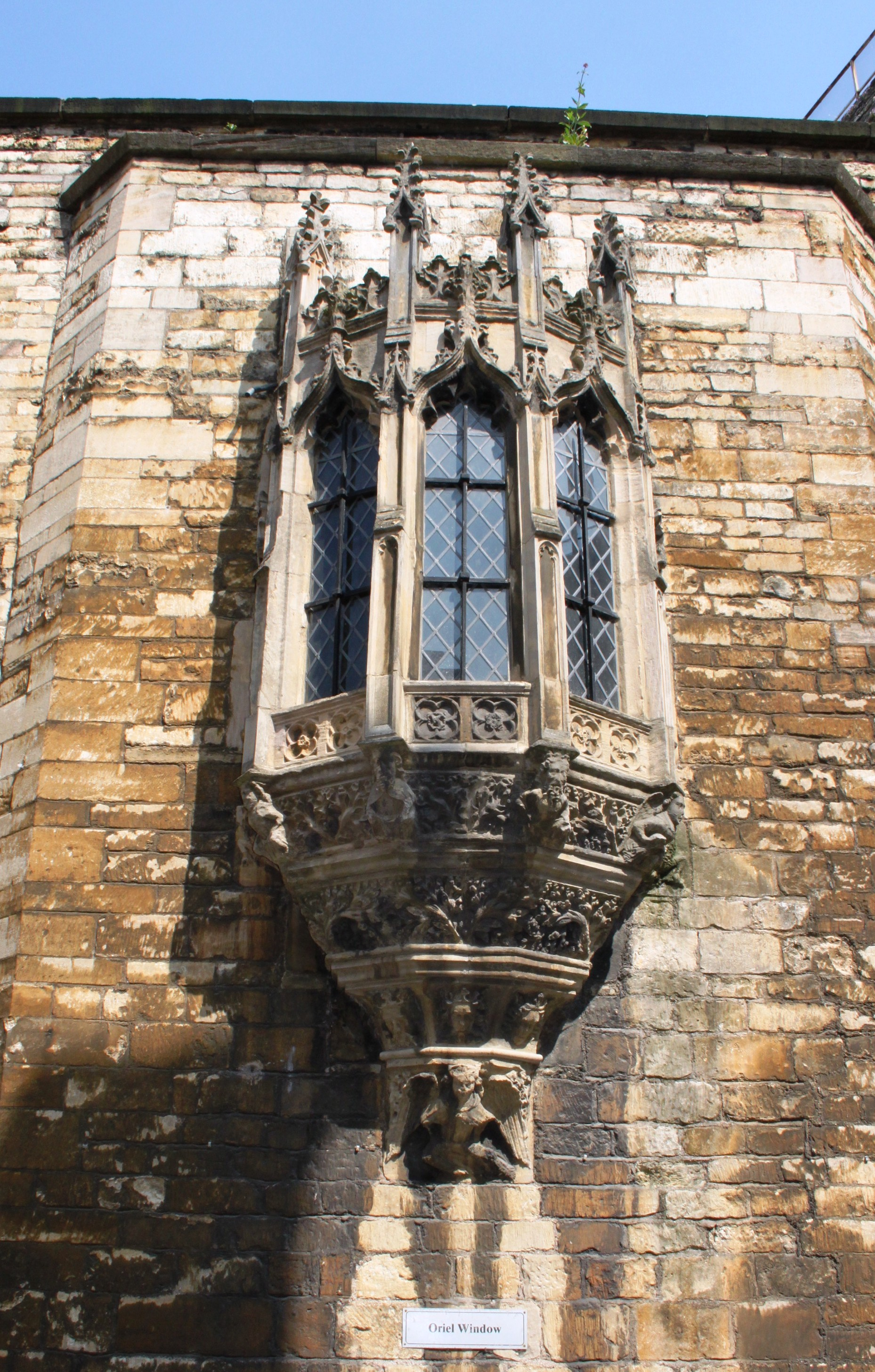
- Lincoln Castle oriel window from John of Gaunt's Palace in the High Street, Lincoln. Re-erected 1849

- Location within Lincolnshire

General information
- Status: Demolished; Oriel window moved to Lincoln Castle
- Type: House
- Architectural style: Gothic
- Location: High Street, Lincoln, Lincolnshire, England, United Kingdom
- Coordinates: 53°13′21.35″N 0°32′39.24″W
- Years built: Late 14th century, before 1386
- Demolished: 18th century–1960s
- Owner: Likely John Sutton or his brother, Robert Sutton

Technical details
- Material: Stone

John of Gaunt's Palace was a late 14th-century merchant's house which stood in the lower part of Lincoln High Street, opposite the St Mary Guildhall. It was progressively demolished from the late 18th century until the 1960s. The very fine oriel window from the building has been preserved in the gatehouse of Lincoln Castle.

== History ==
The palace was initially built by a member of the wealthy Sutton family of Lincoln merchants in the latter years of the 14th century, on land immediately to the north of St Andrew's church. Research into the history of the building by Sir Francis Hill greatly clarified its early ownership. More recently the study of early drawings and maps by David Stocker has made it possible to reconstruct the layout of the building. Stocker suggested the building was probably built by John of Gaunt's vassal John Sutton, a wealthy merchant and mayor of Lincoln in 1386. However S. H. Rigby has made out a case that the palace was originally built by Robert Sutton, the brother of John, also a mayor of Lincoln and vassal of Gaunt, who is known to have built a house on the land to the north of St Andrew's Church before 1386.

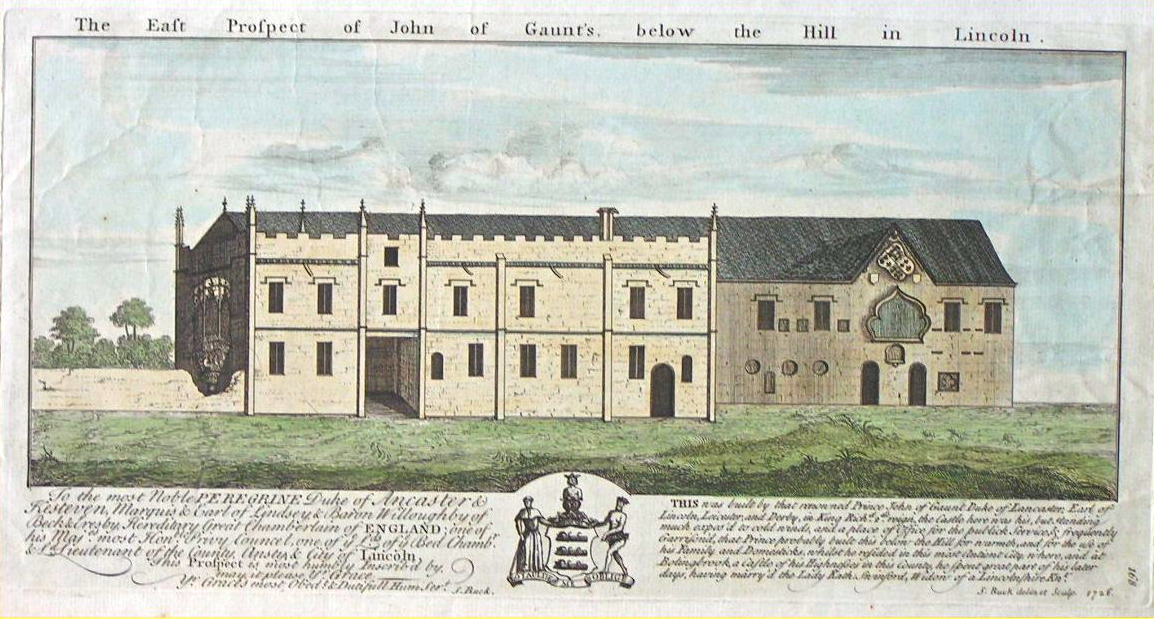
John of Gaunt's Palace, Lincoln 1726

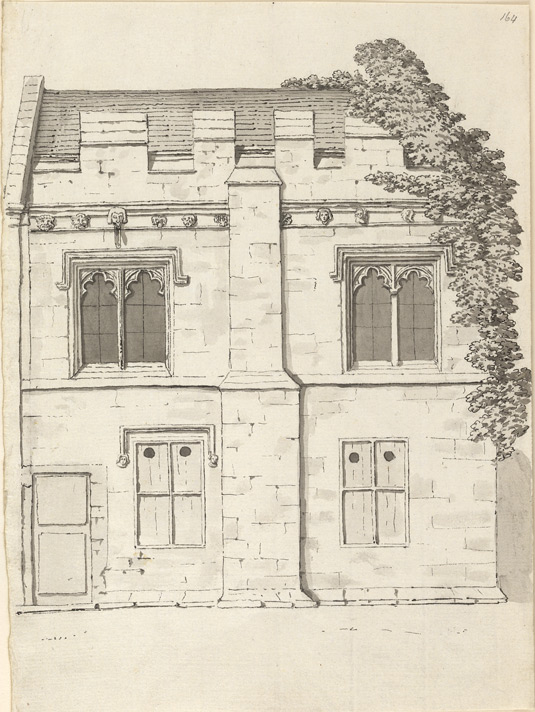
Southern portion of John of Gaunt's Palace by Samuel Hieronymus Grimm, 1784

=== Architectural History ===
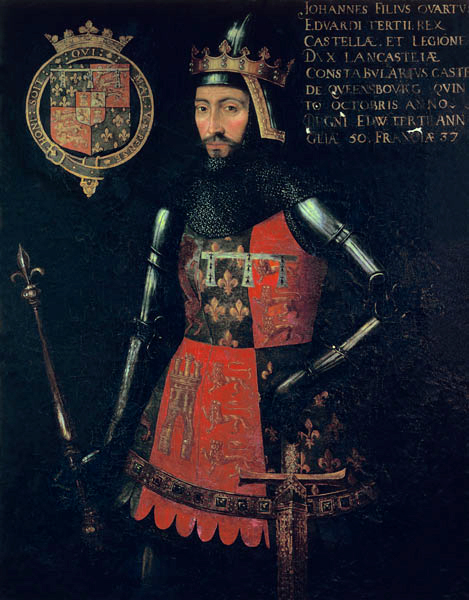
Portrait of John of Gaunt wearing his coat of arms on his tabard.

The house was probably constructed in the late 14th century, and its form represents a wealthy merchant's town house with a hall and services parallel to the High Street, and an east–west range to the rear of the street front range which contained the great hall and privy chambers. There was also a possible lodgings block to the north of the main street front range, which had the arms of John of Gaunt along with other heraldic shields shown above the doors. This lodging block may have accommodated John of Gaunt during his visit to Lincoln in 1386.

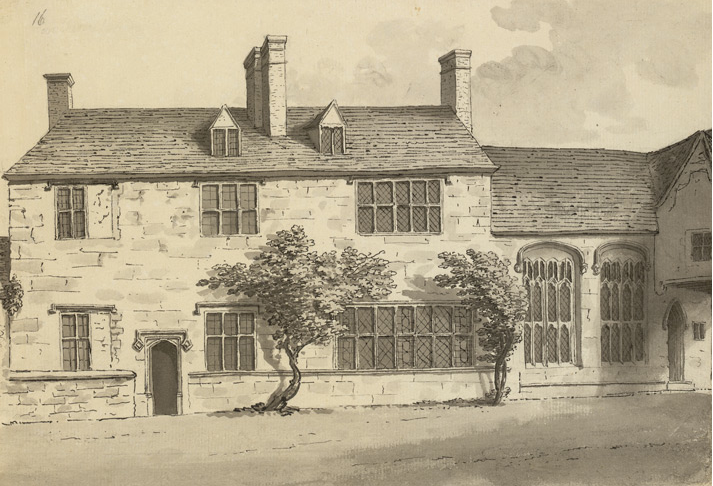
The Old Hospital, Lincoln, at the back of John of Gaunt's Palace; since demolished.

A drawing by Samuel Hieronymus Grimm shows a building described as the Old Hospital abutting on to the hall range with its two fine late medieval windows. These buildings were on the west side behind the High Street frontage of the palace. The hospital building should date from around 1500, and the lozenge-shaped terminals to the doorway and the sunken panels to the spandrels find a very close parallel with the Chancery, in Minster Yard, Lincoln. This is probably the building that Edward James Willson mentions as having been demolished around 1810 and it is not shown on J. S. Padley's survey of Lincoln in 1842.

John of Gaunt's palace was substantially re-built in 1849, becoming an "ordinary-looking stone-built property" which survived until the 1960s, when it was demolished to make way for a garage extension. One of the hall windows, recorded by Edward James Willson, did survive into the 1940s. A series of stone foundations and walls aligned east–west and north–south were recorded in February 2008, during trial trenching at 116 High Street, Lincoln. It is likely that these relate to John of Gaunt's Palace. The earliest phase of wall construction may represent an earlier building demolished to make way for the merchant's house in the later 14th century. Pottery of 13th–15th century date was recovered.

=== Colonel Bromhead's House ===
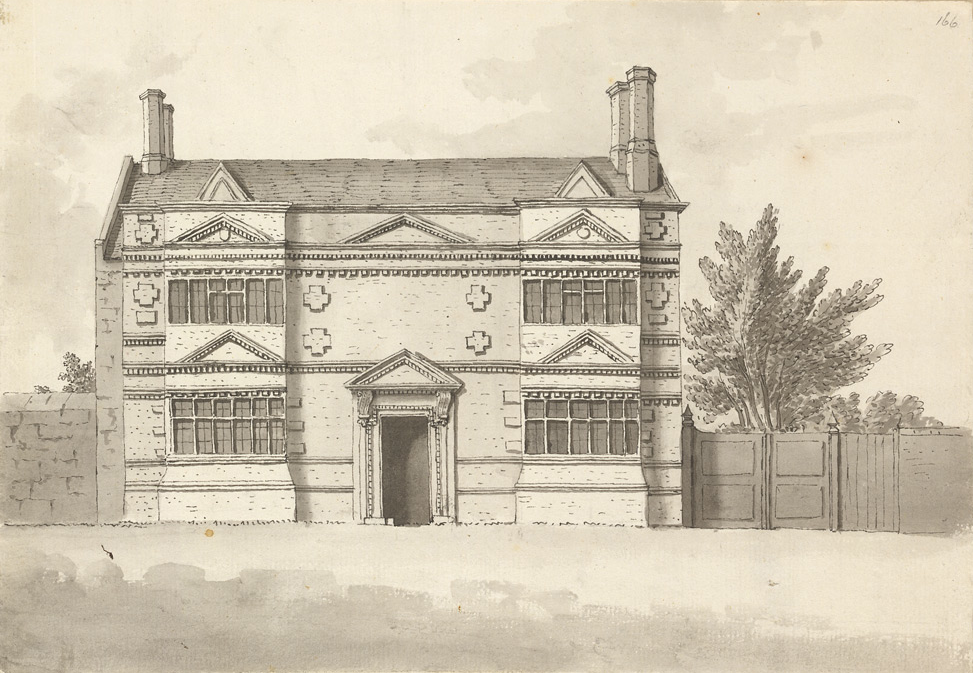
Colonel Bromhead's House, High Street, Lincoln c 1784

Grimm also records another building just to the north of the palace which he describes as "Colonel Bromhead's House". This fronts onto the High Street. This is an interesting example of the Lincolnshire Artisan Mannerist style of house building of the mid-17th century. It was built of brick for Alderman Original Peart in 1646, and was one of the earliest examples of brick building in Lincoln. It passed from him to the Bromhead family.

=== St Andrew's Church, St Andrew's Hall and St Andrew's Cottages ===
To the south of John of Gaunt's Palace was St Andrew's Church, and to the south of this, over the entrance to Gaunt Street and on the site of the former Lincoln Arms, stood a Norman house known as St Andrew's Hall. Just before its demolition in 1783 it was recorded by Samuel Hieronymus Grimm. His drawing shows that it was very similar to the Jew's House and the Norman House on the Strait and Steep Hill in Lincoln. His drawing also shows that St Andrew's Hall was immediately adjacent to St Andrew's Cottages, which are a row of shops that are still standing. The Grade II* listed Romanesque door arch of St Andrew's Hall, dating from about 1150, salvaged during demolition in 1783, was re-sited in 1907 in the former Lincoln Arms, now Bang and Olufsen. It is situated in a first-floor rear room and is constructed of limestone. The outer arch has a complex double chevron moulding enhanced by an early form of dogtooth moulding.The inner arch has keeled roll moulding flanked by quirks and hollows.

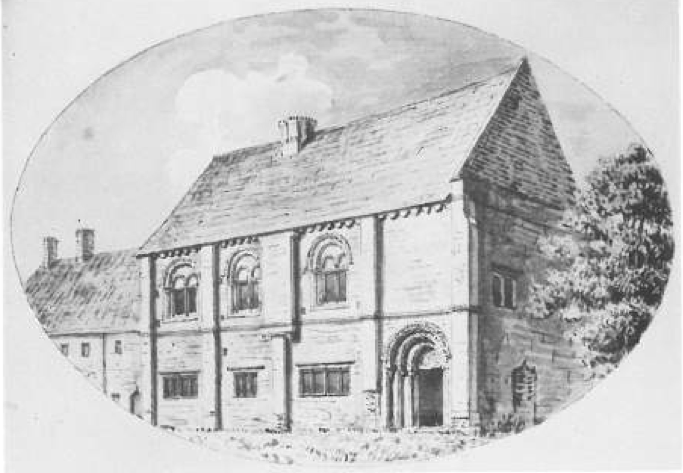
St Andrew's Hall, Wigford, Lincoln, by Samuel Hieronymus Grimm, before demolition in 1783

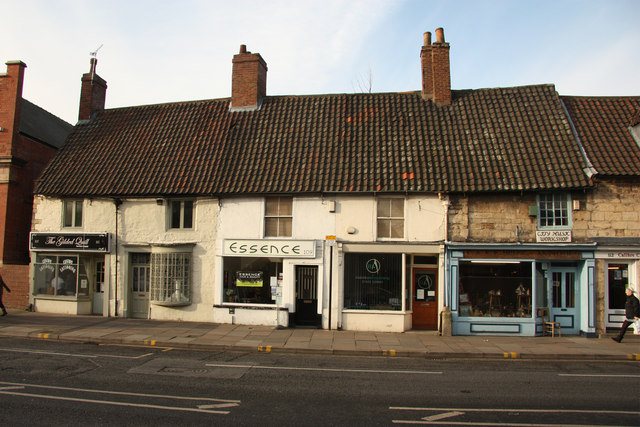
St Andrew's Row, High Street, Lincoln

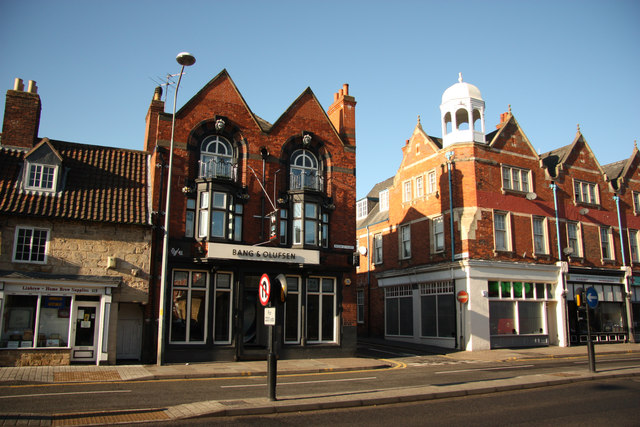
Former Lincoln Arms, the site of St Andrew's Hall, adjacent to St Andrew's Row and Gaunt Street

== Literature ==
- Exley C.L., and Williamson D.M., (1955), Some notes on St Andrew's Hall, Wigford, Lincoln Architectural and Archaeological Society, V0l 6, 118–120.
- Hill, J.W.F., (1948), Medieval Lincoln, Cambridge University Press, pp163, 167, & 168.
- Rigby S.H., (2000), John of Gaunt’s Palace and the Sutton Family of Lincoln. Lincolnshire History and Archaeology, Vol. 35, pp35–40
- Royal Commission on the Historical Monuments of England, (1963), Monuments Threatened or Destroyed, A Select List: 1956-1962.
- Stocker, D.A., (1999), A Very Goodly House Longging to Sutton…" A Reconstruction of John of Gaunt's Palace, Lincoln in Lincolnshire History and Archaeology. Vol. 34,
- Stocker, D.A., et al (1991).St Mary's Guildhall, Lincoln. The Survey and Excavation of a Medieval Building Complex C.B.A. /City of Lincoln Archaeology Unit:The Archaeology of Lincoln, VolXII-1. ISBN 1872414265
- Stocker D. (ed) (2016), Vernacular Architecture Group, Spring Conference 2016: Lincolnshire, March 29th to April 1st 2016, Society for Lincolnshire History and Archaeology.pp17–18.

== See also - Medieval Domestic Architecture in Lincoln ==
- St. Mary's Guildhall, Lincoln
- Whitefriars, 333 High Street, Lincoln
- Jew's House
- Jew's Court
