= Thomas Thornhagh =

English politician

Thomas Thornhagh (fl. 1390–95) was an English politician.

Thornhagh was elected Mayor of Lincoln for 1390–91 and was Coroner of Lincoln for at least three years (by 1392 until after 21 September 1395).

Thornhagh was a member (MP) of the parliament of England for Lincoln in 1393.

Parliament of England
Preceded by Robert Sutton; Robert Ledes	Member of Parliament for Lincoln; 1393; With: John Belasise	Succeeded by Robert Sutton; Robert Messingham
