= Alanson (name) =

Alanson is both a given name and a surname. Notable people with the name include:

Given name:

- Alanson H. Barnes (1817–1890), American judge
- Alanson W. Beard (1825–1900), American politician
- Alanson Beers (1808–1853), American pioneer and politician
- Alanson Cooke (1811–1904), Canadian businessman and politician
- Alanson Crossman (died 1853), American blacksmith and politician
- Alanson Harris (1816–1894), Canadian businessman
- Alanson Holly (1810–1882), American newspaper editor and politician
- Alanson Hodges Hough (1803–1886), American physician and politician
- Alanson B. Houghton (1863–1941), American businessman, politician and diplomat
- Alanson M. Kimball (1827–1913), American politician
- Alanson T. Lincoln (1858–1925), American politician
- Alanson W. Nightingill (1826–1870), American county sheriff
- Alanson Merwin Randol (1837–1887), Union Army officer
- Alanson Skinner (1794–1876), American manufacturer and politician
- Alanson Sweet (1804–1891), American pioneer, businessman and politician
- Alanson B. Vaughan (1806–1876), American politician
- Alanson Weeks (1877–1947), American football player

Surname:

- Craig Alanson, American author and audio playwright
- Mazhar Alanson (born 1950), Turkish musician and actor
- Robert Alanson, 16th-century English politician
- William Alanson, 16th-century English politician
