= List of mayors of the Boston Staple =

Mayors of the Boston Staple, Lincolnshire, England:

- 1375-76 and 1384-85: John Sutton of Lincoln
- 1379-80:Robert Sutton
- 1389-1390: William Dalderby
- 1390-1391: Robert Ledes
