= Thornhagh =

Thornhagh is a surname. Notable people with the surname include:

- Francis Thornhagh (1617–1648), English soldier and MP
- John Thornhagh (1648–1723), English Whig politician
- Thomas Thornhagh (fl. 1390–95), English politician
