= Mayor of Lincoln =

Mayor of Lincoln may refer to:

- Mayor of Lincoln, England
- Mayor of Lincoln, Nebraska
