= Grantham (disambiguation) =

Grantham is a town in Lincolnshire in the United Kingdom.

Grantham may also refer to:

== Places ==
=== Australia ===
- Grantham Farm, New South Wales
- Grantham, Queensland
- Grantham County, Western Australia

=== Canada ===
- Grantham, Alberta
- Grantham, St. Catharines, a neighbourhood in Ontario

=== United States ===
- Grantham, New Hampshire
- Grantham, Pennsylvania

== Other uses ==
- Grantham (surname)
- Grantham University, a proprietary school in the United States
- Grantham Institute – Climate Change and Environment (Imperial College), a global institute on climate and environmental change
- Grantham (constituency), UK former constituency
- Grantham script, a Brahmic writing system
