= Robert Leeds =

Robert Leeds may refer to:

- Robert M. Leeds (1920–2000), American film and television director
- Sex and the City characters#Robert Leeds, a fictional character on the Sex and the City television series
- Robert Ledes, English politician of the late 14th century
