= Thomas Grantham =

Thomas Grantham may refer to:

- Sir Thomas Grantham (merchant) (1641–1718), English tobacco trader and naval officer
- Thomas Grantham (died 1592), member of parliament (MP) for Great Grimsby (UK Parliament constituency)
- Thomas Grantham (died 1558), MP for Lincoln
- Sir Thomas Grantham (died 1630), MP for Lincoln, and for Lincolnshire
- Thomas Grantham (Parliamentarian) (1612–1655), his son, MP for Lincoln
- Thomas Grantham (Baptist) (1634–1692), English minister
