= RAF Coleby Grange =

Former RAF station in Lincolnshire, England

RAF Coleby Grange
- Coleby, North Kesteven, Lincolnshire in England
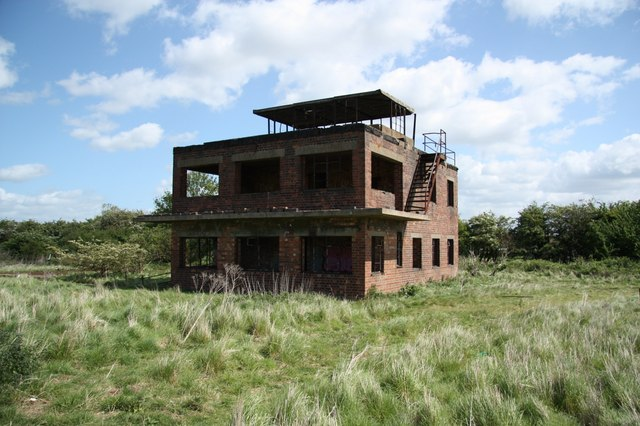
- The original airfield control tower at RAF Coleby Grange still stands

Site information
- Type: Royal Air Force satellite station
- Code: CG
- Owner: Ministry of Defence
- Operator: Royal Air Force
- Controlled by: RAF Flying Training Command; RAF Fighter Command * No. 12 Group RAF; RAF Bomber Command

Location
- Shown within Lincolnshire RAF Coleby Grange (the United Kingdom)
- Coordinates: 53°07′47″N 000°29′55″W

Site history
- Built: 1938
- In use: 1939-1963
- Battles/wars: European theatre of World War II; Cold War

Airfield information
- Elevation: 61 metres (200 ft) AMSL
Runways
Direction	Length and surface
NE/SW	1,800 metres (5,906 ft) Grass
NW/SE	1,280 metres (4,199 ft) Grass
W/E	880 metres (2,887 ft) Grass

Royal Air Force Coleby Grange or more simply RAF Coleby Grange was a Royal Air Force satellite station situated alongside the western edge of the A15 on open heathland between the villages of Coleby and Nocton Heath and lying 7.4 mi (11.9 km) due south of the county town Lincoln, Lincolnshire, England.

Opened in 1939 and operated as a fighter and night fighter airfield during the Second World War, occupied at various times by UK, US, Canadian and Polish fighter squadrons, the station briefly switched to a training role post-war before being placed on a care and maintenance basis.

Reopened in 1959 as an RAF Bomber Command Intermediate-range ballistic missile (IRBM) launch facility and placed on a high DEFCON 2 launch alert during the Cuban Missile Crisis, the station was finally closed and decommissioned in 1963. The site has been returned to agricultural use and now has little evidence of its former use, other than several lengths of perimeter track and the original air traffic control tower.

== History ==
=== Second World War ===
The station was constructed during late 1938 and opened early in 1939 initially as a relief landing ground (RLG) for the training facility at RAF Cranwell although quite quickly. In early 1940, two squadrons No. 253 Squadron RAF and No. 264 Squadron RAF took up residence at Coleby Grange.

The station was destined never to be upgraded with concrete or tarmac runways and throughout its operational life used three grass runways. Aircraft remained parked outdoors on permanent flight readiness and initially only a single Type T1 hangar was constructed for use during aircraft repairs. Much later one blister type hangar and seven extended over-blister hangars were added.

The station's technical and communal accommodation sites were located on the northern rim of the station with a vehicle access from Heath Road and the headquarters site was on the eastern edge adjacent to the A15 Lincoln to Sleaford road.

The B1202 Heath Lane on the southern boundary was closed to traffic and became part of the airfield's perimeter track. With only a few exceptions the buildings were of the temporary Nissen or Quonset hutting type and the station never developed the air of permanence achieved by many other RAF stations. The nearby Coleby Hall, built in 1628, was requisitioned by the Air Ministry for the duration of the war and adopted as the station's officers’ mess. Living accommodation on the station was graded for 1,800 RAF and WAAF personnel including officers.

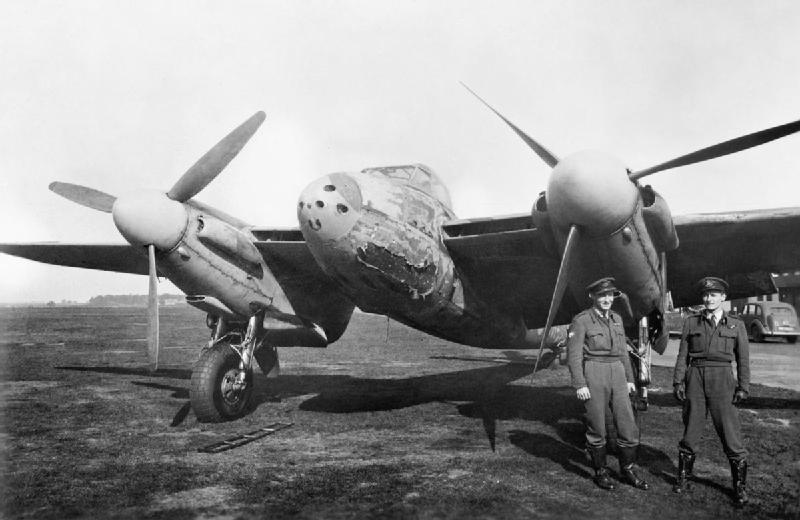
Two 410 Squadron aircrew and their de Havilland Mosquito at Coleby Grange, 27 September 1943. The aircraft had been damaged in combat over the Netherlands the previous night

In May 1941 the station was transferred to No. 12 Group RAF and severed its link with RAF Cranwell. Instead Coleby Grange became a satellite field of nearby RAF Digby and was occupied in turn by No. 402 Squadron RCAF, No. 409 Squadron RCAF, No. 410 Squadron RCAF and No. 307 Polish Night Fighter Squadron

In 1751 a 100 ft (30 m) high landmark and former inland lighthouse known as the Dunston Pillar had been erected less than a mile north of the station on Tower Road to aid travellers crossing the wild heathland south of Lincoln. As the tower was within the flying circuit of the new airfield 40 ft (12 m) was removed from the tower's height and its top-piece statue of King George III was removed to Lincoln Castle, where it remains today.

Until 1943 RAF Coleby Grange formed only part of a ring of fighter stations around Lincoln but, when the German daylight offensive wound down, RAF Digby shifted to a non-flying radar calibration role, RAF Kirton in Lindsey re-roled as a training establishment and RAF Hibaldstow closed. For the remainder of the war Coleby Grange remained as the only local station still operating in the night fighter role across Lincolnshire.

During the D-Day landings RAF Coleby Grange was used as a fighter station by the 425th Fighter Squadron US Army Air Force, flying Northrop P-61 Black Widows and Douglas P70 Havocs in support of the US 9th Armored Division. The squadron was under the command of the US Ninth Air Force from its headquarters at St Vincents, a large mansion in the centre of Grantham.

=== Post war years ===
Immediately after the war the RAF mounted an annual series of air displays to commemorate the Battle of Britain. The first of these displays in Lincolnshire took place in September 1946 at RAF Coleby Grange, as the only remaining fighter station in the county amid all the many bomber stations.

When the war came to a close the control of Coleby Grange was returned to No. 17 Flying Training School at RAF Cranwell and the station became home to No. 1515 Beam Approach Training Flight flying Airspeed Oxfords and No. 107 Elementary Glider School. No. 1515 BAT Flight left for RAF Spitalgate in 1946 and the glider squadron relocated to RAF Barkston Heath in 1947.

The station was mothballed and placed on a care and maintenance basis from 1947 until 1958 when it was reactivated as an IRBM missile facility.

=== Cold War ===
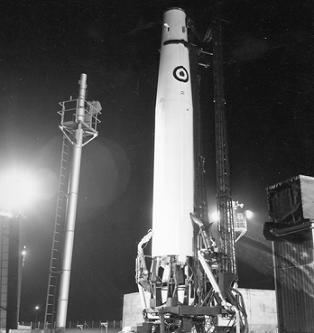
British PGM-17 Thor missile

In January 1956 RAF Hemswell just north of Lincoln was established as an RAF Bomber Command missile unit, maintaining and operating nine mobile mounted Thor Intermediate Range Ballistic Nuclear Missile launchers of No 97 (Strategic Missile) Squadron RAF. Each missile with a range of 1,500 mi (2,400 km) was tipped with a 1.44 megaton nuclear warhead, jointly controlled by the Royal Air Force and the United States Air Force under the so-called "dual-key arrangements".

In 1959 RAF Hemswell became the headquarters for the "No. 5 (Lincolnshire) Missile Dispersal Sites" located at RAF Bardney, RAF Caistor, RAF Ludford Magna and RAF Coleby Grange. The missiles at Coleby Grange were maintained and operated by No. 142 Squadron RAF.

The Cuban Missile Crisis brought the entire UK based Thor missile force to maximum strategic alert and readiness for a ten-day period during October and November 1962. On 26 October 1962 the NATO alert level was raised to DEFCON 2 and the missiles were made ready for launching, on a phased-hold leaving the missiles eight minutes from launch in the vertical unfuelled condition or two minutes from launch in the fuelled position. Several Lincoln residents can remember the Coleby Grange missiles standing erect on their mobile launchers and ready to fire. Politically, the following day came to be referred to as "Black Saturday" and was very tense until a negotiated stand-down by both sides was reached.

=== The station closes ===
RAF Coleby Grange was decommissioned and closed in 1963. In 1964 and 1965 the land was sold at auction and returned to agricultural use. Unfortunately most of the buildings have been demolished with a small number adapted to alternate uses in farm complexes. The original air operations control tower and part of a Thor blast wall still stand in view of the A15 in derelict conditions. The control tower is reputed locally to be haunted.

The graves of many airmen that died while serving at the station can be found in the graveyard at nearby Scopwick. In the same graveyard is the final resting place of the poet John Gillespie Magee Jr., author of the classic aviation poem "High Flight". Magee was flying from nearby RAF Wellingore when his Spitfire collided in mid-air with an Airspeed Oxford from RAF Cranwell.

The long-distance footpath known as the Viking Way passes less than a mile from the Coleby Grange site.

== Station timeline and resident units ==
Date	Event or unit	Notes
1938	Airfield and accommodation site construction commences	
Spring 1939	RAF Coleby Grange opened as a relief landing ground (RLG) for RAF Cranwell; Station Identity Code: CG	
May 1940	No. 253 Squadron RAF	Operating Hawker Hurricane Mark 1s and relocated from RAF Cranwell. Left the station in July 1940 and relocated to RAF Turnhouse
May 1940	No. 264 Squadron RAF	Flying Boulton Paul Defiants and training for a night fighter role. Relocated to RAF Colerne near Bristol.
May 1941	Control of RAF Coleby Grange switched to No. 12 Group RAF	The station became a satellite field for RAF Digby
May 1941	No. 402 Squadron RCAF	Operating Hawker Hurricane Mark IIs relocated from RAF Digby. Squadron re-equipped with Supermarine Spitfire Mark Vbs and left for RAF Colerne in March 1942
26 July 1941	No. 409 Squadron RCAF	Operating Boulton Paul Defiants and arrived from RAF Digby. Re-equipped in August 1941 with Bristol Beaufighter Mark IIfs and in June 1942 with Mark VIs. Relocated to RAF Acklington on 23 February 1943.
February 1943	No. 410 Squadron RCAF	Operating de Havilland Mosquito and arrived from RAF Acklington. Departed in October 1943 for RAF West Malling
March 1943	No. 288 Squadron RAF	288 Squadron formed at RAF Digby on 18 November 1941 from No. 12 Group AAC Flight. It continued to provide anti-aircraft cooperation training to ground-based gun crews, towing targets with a variety of aircraft, mainly the Miles Martinet. Squadron departed for Yorkshire in November 1943
21 November 1943	No. 264 Squadron RAF	Returned from night defence duties over the Bristol Channel ports from the base at RAF Colerne and re-equipped with de Havilland Mosquitos in November 1943. Now operating as a night defence force for bomber operations.
19 December 1943	No. 409 Squadron RCAF	Squadron returned from RAF Acklington until 5 February 1944 when they relocated to RAF Hunsdon
February 1944	No. 68 Squadron RAF	Operating Bristol Beaufighters and arrived from RAF High Ercall in Shropshire. Relocated to RAF Coltishall in March 1944
1 March 1944	No. 2882 Squadron RAF Regiment (LAA Squadron)	The RAuxAF unit of Light Anti Aircraft gunners for airfield defence formed at Coleby Grange
March 1944	No. 307 Polish Night Fighter Squadron	Operating de Havilland Mosquito Mark NFXIIs in a night intruder unit over enemy airfields in occupied France. Squadron was disbanded on 2 January 1947
20 March 1944	No. 17 Service Flying Training School RAF	The Service Flight Training School moved to Coleby Grange from RAF Cranwell and remained until March 1945 when it relocated to RAF Spitalgate in Grantham
May 1944	425th Fighter Squadron USAAF	Flying Northrop P-61 Black Widows and Douglas P70 Havocs in support of the US 9th Armored Division during D-Day and early operations during the European campaign. The squadron departed for operations from captured airfields in France soon after the D-Day invasion.
February 1945	Control of RAF Coleby Grange reverted to RAF Cranwell	
February 1945	No. 1515 (Beam Approach Training) Flight RAF	Operating Airspeed Oxfords. The Beam Approach Training flight had moved to Shropshire's RAF Peplow in January 1945, but there were difficulties caused by beam approach conflict at Peplow and nearby RAF Hinstock as the beams were almost parallel. Both stations were taken over by the Fleet Air Arm as the twin HMS Godwit carrier landing training facilities and the Navy were given precedence, so 1515 Flight were only able to operate when the cloud base was above 1,000 feet (300 m). The conflicting needs were only solved a month later when 1515 Flight was relocated to Coleby Grange. The flight relocated to RAF Spitalgate and was disbanded on 9 January 1946
February 1945	No. 107 Gliding School RAF	The Gliding School was relocated from RAF Cranwell and remained at Coleby Grange until it moved to RAF Syerston where it still exists, renumbered as No. 643 Volunteer Gliding School RAF
May 1946	Operational flying ceased from RAF Coleby Grange. Station placed on a care and maintenance basis	
September 1946	Battle of Britain Air Display mounted at Coleby Grange	
1959	Control of RAF Coleby Grange was handed to RAF Bomber Command. Station ID code WC2	RAF Coleby Grange formed part of "No. 5 (Lincolnshire) Missile Dispersal Sites" with missiles also rotated around RAF Hemswell, RAF Bardney, RAF Caistor and RAF Ludford Magna
1959	No. 142 Squadron RAF	Operating the 3 mobile Thor Intermediate Range Ballistic Missiles while they were on site. When the UK Thor IRBM Force was stood down in 1963 the missiles were returned to the US and their warheads removed before the launch vehicles were reused in the space programme - predominantly launching communications satellites.
1963	RAF Coleby Grange was decommissioned and closed. The land was sold by auction in 1964/65 and returned to agricultural uses.	

== Gallery ==
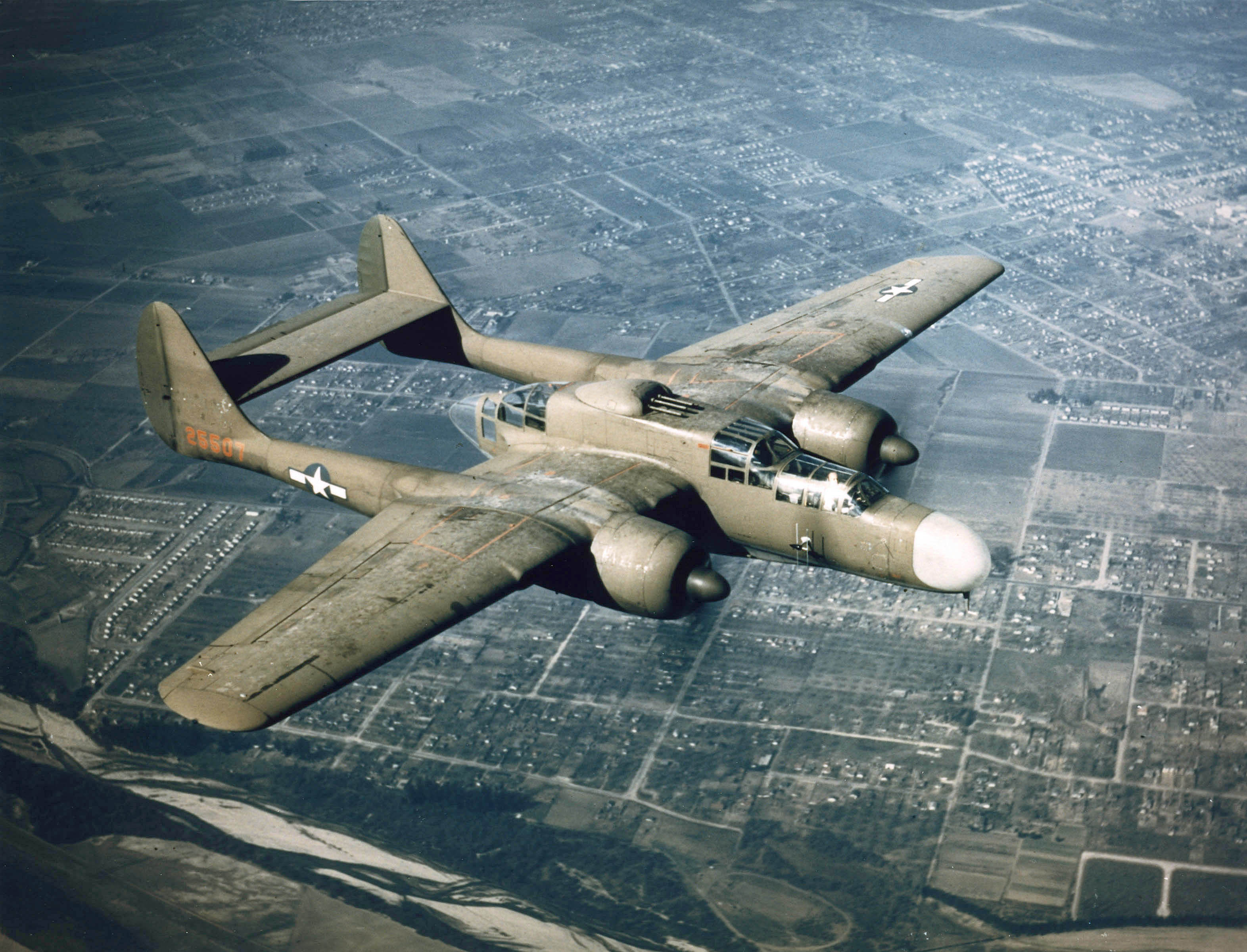
A Northrop P-61 Black Widow used during the invasion of Europe during 1944 in a ground support role

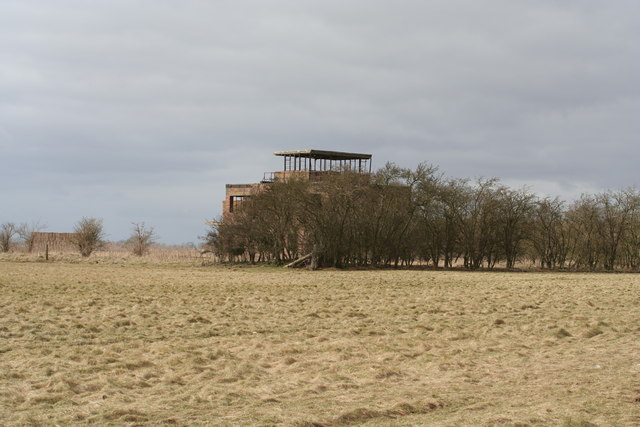
Former control tower and watch office at RAF Coleby Grange

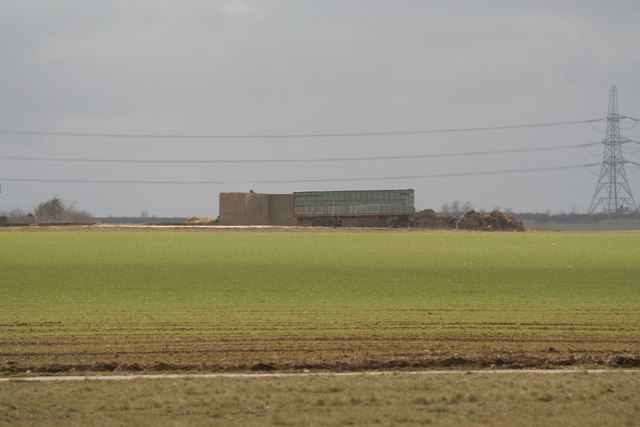
Remains of the Thor IRBM blast wall at Coleby

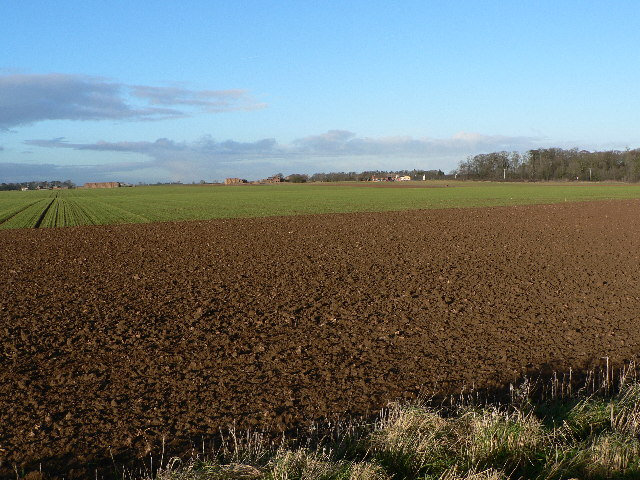
View looking north over the heathland that was RAF Coleby Grange, photographed from Boothby Graffoe

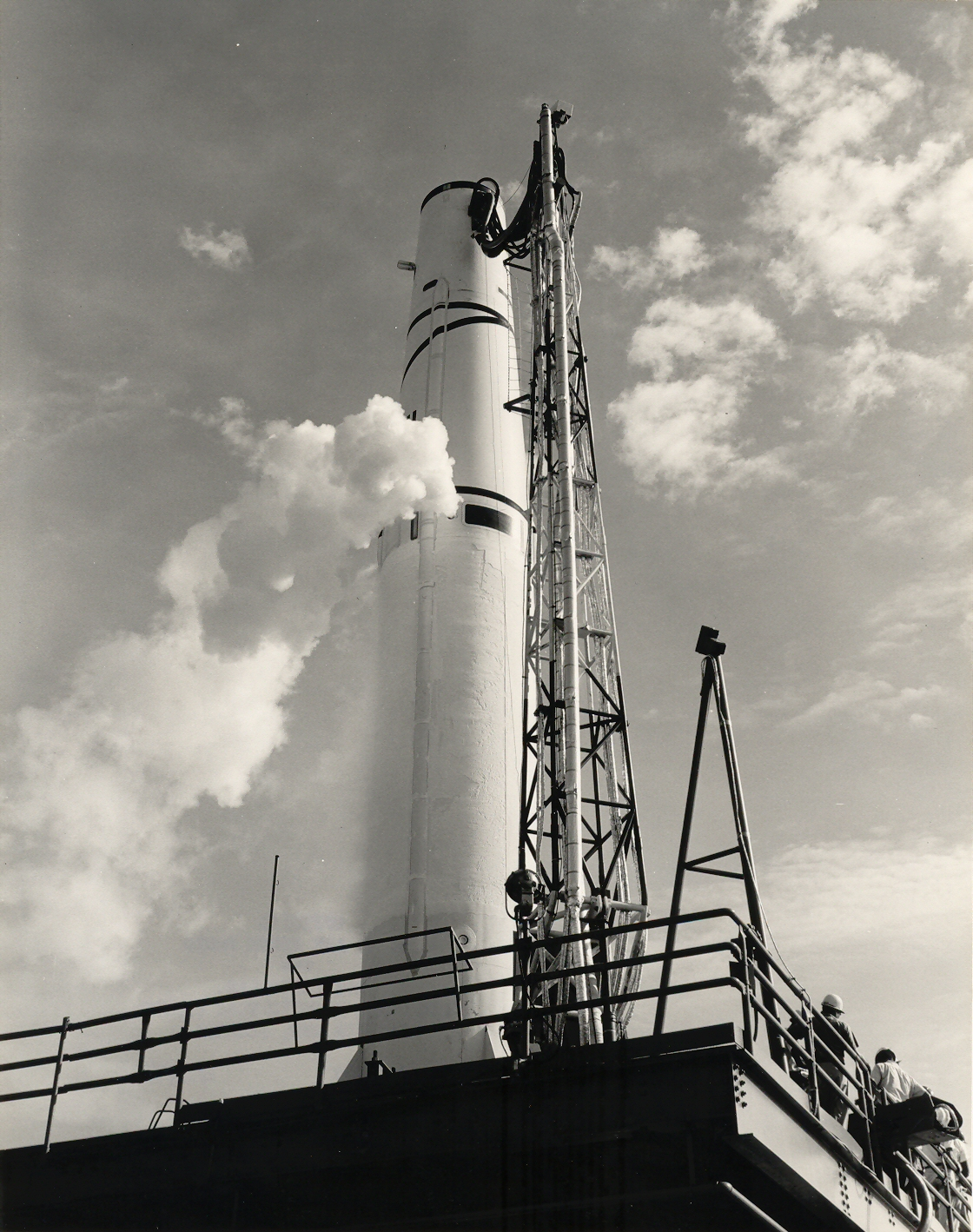
A Thor missile ready to launch, with its nuclear warhead replaced by a communications satellite payload

== See also ==
- List of former Royal Air Force stations
