= Grantham (surname) =

Grantham is an English surname, originally associated with the town of Grantham, which has been spread to North America and Australasia. Notable people with the surname include:

- Alexander Grantham (1899–1978), British colonial administrator
- Donald Grantham (born 1947), American composer
- Donte Grantham (born 1995), American basketball player
- Eric Grantham (1913–1989), British sports shooter
- George Grantham (baseball) (1900–1954), American baseball player
- George Grantham (economic historian) (born 1941), American economic historian
- George Grantham (musician) (born 1947), American drummer and vocalist
- Sir Guy Grantham (1900–1992), British Admiral, Commander-in-Chief at Portsmouth
- Jared J. Grantham (1936–2017), American physician and nephrologist
- Jeremy Grantham (born 1938), Chairman of the Board of Grantham Mayo Van Otterloo, a Boston-based asset management firm
- John Grantham (1809–1874), English engineer
- Joseph Grantham (died 1830), first police officer to be killed on duty in the United Kingdom
- Kevin Grantham (born 1970), American politician
- Larry Grantham (1938–2017), American football player
- Leslie Grantham (1947–2018), British TV actor
- Richard Grantham (1677–1723), English politician
- Roy Grantham (1926–2013), British trade union leader
- Sir Thomas Grantham (merchant) (1640s–1718), commander of the naval fleet of the British East India Company
- Thomas Grantham (died 1558) (1520s–1558), English politician
- Thomas Grantham (died 1630) (1573–1630), English politician
- Thomas Grantham (Baptist) (1634–1692), English General Baptist minister and theologian
- Thomas Grantham (Parliamentarian) (1612–1655), English politician
- Todd Grantham (born 1966), American football coach
- Tony Grantham (born 1972), New Zealand lawn bowler
- Travis Grantham (born 1979), American politician
- Vincent Grantham (died 1550), English MP
- Violet Grantham (1893–1983), British politician
- William Grantham (1835–1911), English judge and Conservative M.P. for East Surrey and Croydon
