= Ledes =

Ledes is a surname. Notable people with the surname include:

- Luís Gustavo Ledes (born 1992), Portuguese footballer
- Richard Ledes (born 1956), American filmmaker and writer
- Robert Ledes, c. fourteenth century politician

== See also ==
- Legal Electronic Data Exchange Standard
