= William Blyton =

William Blyton may refer to:

- Billy Blyton, Baron Blyton (1899–1987), English MP
- William Blyton (fl. 1399–1402), MP for Lincoln in 1399 and 1402
- William H. Blyton (1842–1932), American businessman and politician
