= John Halton (disambiguation) =

John Halton was an MP.

John Halton may also refer to:

- John Halton (anaesthetist), see Ye Cracke
- John de Halton (died 1324), English priest, bishop of Carlisle
