= Nicholas Huddleston =

English politician

Nicholas Huddleston (fl. 1404), of Lincoln, was an English politician.

He was elected Mayor of Lincoln for 1405–06 and a member (MP) of the parliament of England for Lincoln in October 1404.
