= Dunston Pillar =

18th century tower in Lincolnshire, England

Coordinates: 53°08′44″N 0°29′40″W

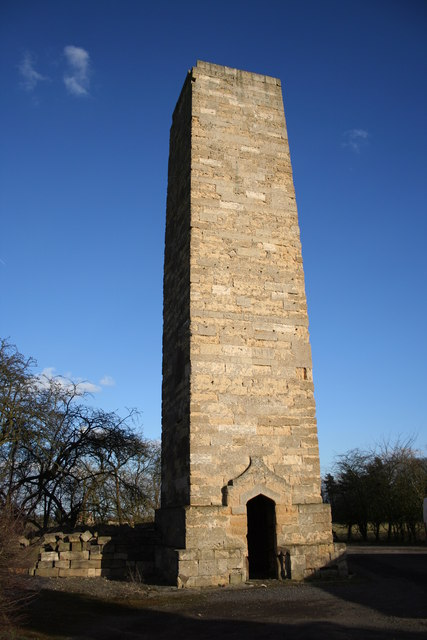
Dunston Pillar, truncated in 1940 to protect low-flying RAF aeroplanes

Dunston Pillar is a Grade II listed stone tower in Lincolnshire, England and a former 'land lighthouse'. It stands beside the A15 road approximately 6 miles (10 km) south of Lincoln near the junction of the B1178 (also known as Tower Lane), in the parish of Dunston, north of Sleaford. It is on private land and is closed to the public.

== History ==
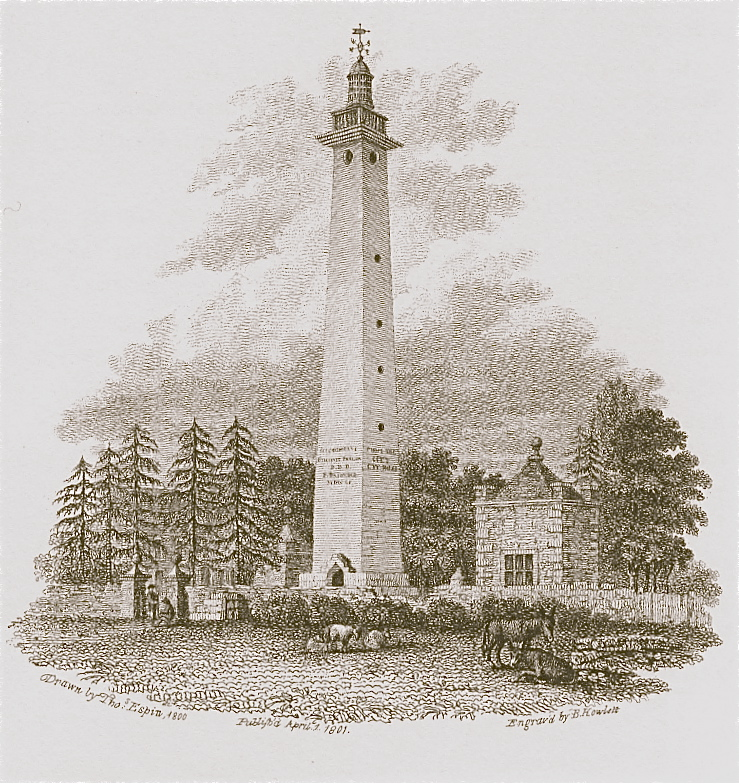
Dunston Pillar from Bartholomew Howlett's A Selection of Views in the County of Lincoln (1801)

The original land lighthouse was commissioned by Sir Francis Dashwood (better known as the founder of the Knights of St Francis, which became the Monks of Medmenham, later called a Hellfire Club) in 1751 as a gift to his wife Sarah (Ellys) Dashwood, who feared crossing the dark heath near her childhood home, Nocton. The purpose of the land lighthouse was to improve the safety of 18th-century travellers crossing a particularly treacherous area of the county known for its many incidents of robbery by highwaymen. In the 1843 Journal of the Agricultural Society it was described as the "only land light-house ever raised".

The structure originally stood 92 feet (28 metres) high, with a staircase inside the tower and a large octagonal lantern on top to aid travellers crossing the wild heathland south of Lincoln. The lantern was regularly lit until 1788 and was used for the last time in 1808 by which time improvements in the local road network had made it effectively obsolete.

Sir Francis landscaped the base of Dunston Tower with a plantation of trees and a bowling green. It became a popular gathering place for picnics, tea parties, quoits and cards. A two-storey dining hall was later added. The vicar of Welbourn called it "the Vauxhall" of Lincolnshire, and the Lincoln Club was formed to arrange entertainments there.

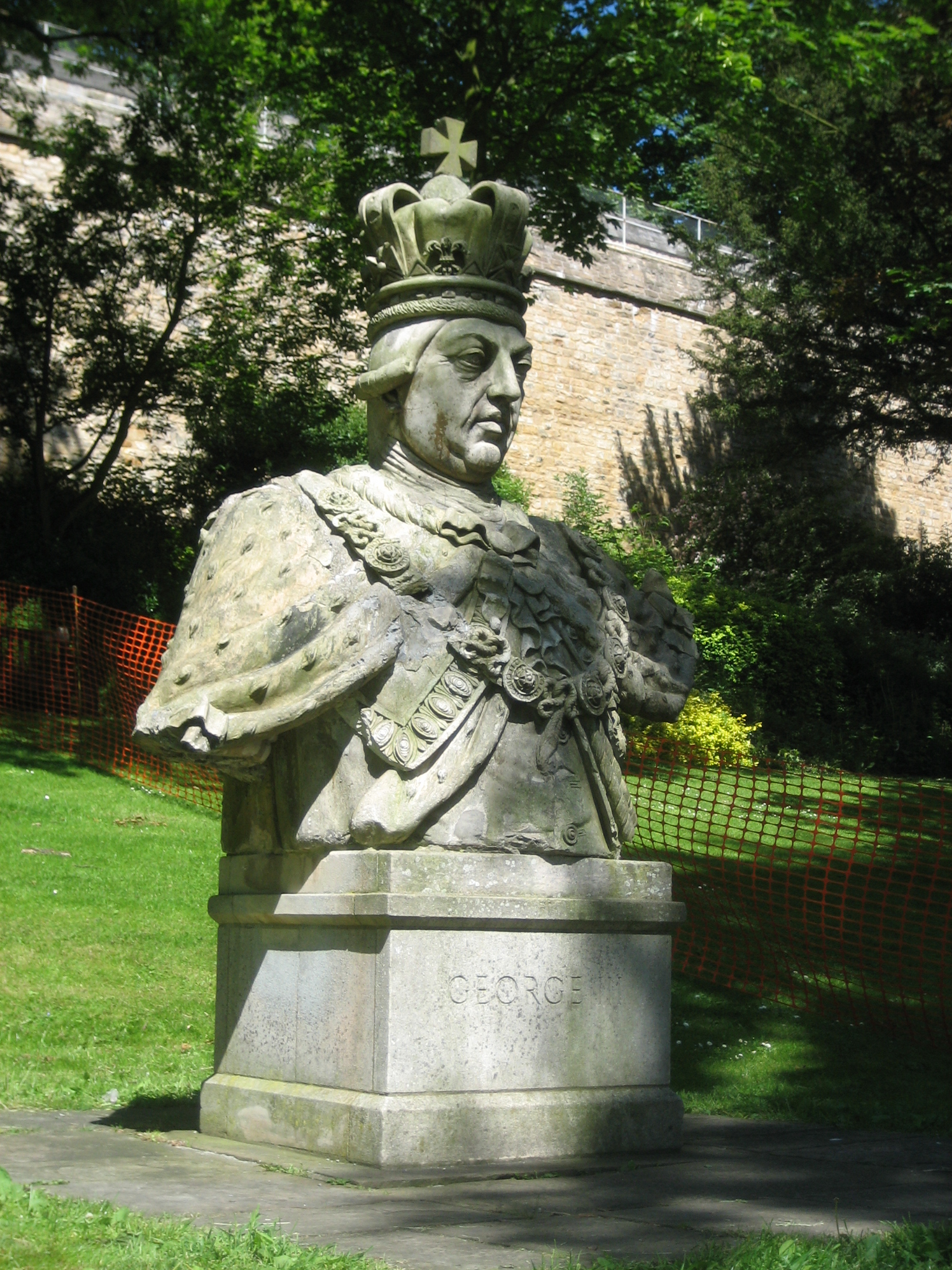
Bust of George III from the pillar, now at Lincoln Castle

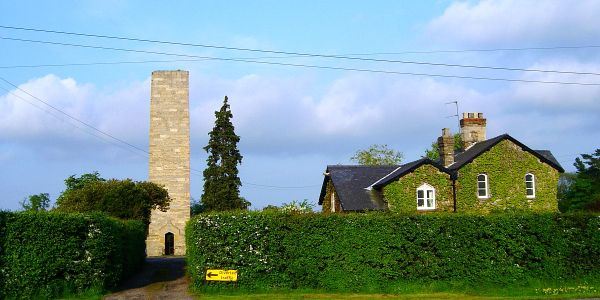
Dunston Pillar in 2004

In 1808, the lantern was destroyed in a storm and was replaced in 1810 by the 4th Earl of Buckinghamshire, in celebration of the Golden Jubilee of George III, with a Coade stone (lithodipyra) statue of King George III sculpted by Joseph Panzetta for Eleanor Coade.

In 1940, the pillar was considered to be a hazard to low-flying aircraft approaching nearby RAF Coleby Grange, and the tower's height was lowered by 40 feet (12 metres) to reduce the risk of accident. At this time the oversize statue of George III was removed and broken up; the surviving bust can be seen in the grounds of Lincoln Castle. The statue is a listed building in its own right.

The tower remains a well-known landmark and to this day is clearly visible beside the busy road at grid reference TF008620.

== See also ==
- Pelham's Pillar
- Grimsby Dock Tower
