= William Rotheram =

16th-century English politician

William Rotheram (by 1519 – will proved 1559), of Lincoln was an English Mayor and member of parliament.

He was appointed sheriff of Lincoln for 1545, made Mayor of Lincoln for 1554–55 and elected a member (MP) of the parliament of England for Lincoln in April 1554.

He was married with a son and two daughters.
