= John Ryle (mayor) =

English politician

John Ryle (fl. 1412 – 1414), of Lincoln, was an English politician.

He was elected Mayor of Lincoln for 1412 and a member (MP) of the parliament of England for Lincoln in November 1414.
