= Robert Saltby =

Member of the Parliament of England

Robert Saltby (fl. 1383–1386), of Lincoln, was an English landowner, mayor and member of parliament.

He was a member (MP) of the parliament of England for Lincoln in 1383 and 1386. He also served as Mayor of Lincoln for 1383–84.

He married Joan, the widow of Alexander Herlley of Lincoln and had at least one son.
