= William Sammes (politician) =

16th-century mayor and MP

William Sammes (by 1491 – 1542 or later), of Lincoln, was an English politician.

Sammes was Mayor of Lincoln in 1515–16. He was a member (MP) of the parliament of England for Lincoln in 1529.
