= Robert Alanson =

English politician

Robert Alanson (by 1472 – 1540) of Lincoln, England was an English Member of Parliament.

== Biography ==
In business in Lincoln as a goldsmith, Alanson was appointed Sheriff of Lincoln for 1493–94 and Mayor of Lincoln for 1501–02, 1511–12, 1524–25 and 1535–36. He was elected an alderman of the city by 1511, a position he held until his death.

He was a Member of Parliament (MP) for Lincoln in 1512 and 1515. He was returned to Parliament in 1515 in compliance with the King's demand for the return of the previous Members.

He married three times and had two sons, including William Alanson, MP, who was to sit for Lincoln in the Parliament of 1542. As a jeweller of the parish of St. Lawrence, he left bequests to the cathedral, to his parish church and various guilds.
