= John Balderton =

English politician

John Balderton (fl. 1402) of Lincoln, was an English politician.

He was elected Mayor of Lincoln for 1399–1400 and a member (MP) of the parliament of England for Lincoln in 1402.
