= Richard Bell (MP for Lincoln) =

English politician

Richard Bell (died c. 1417), of Lincoln, was an English politician.

He was elected Mayor of Lincoln for 1411–12 and a member (MP) of the parliament of England for Lincoln in 1407.
