= Whitefriars, 333 High Street, Lincoln =

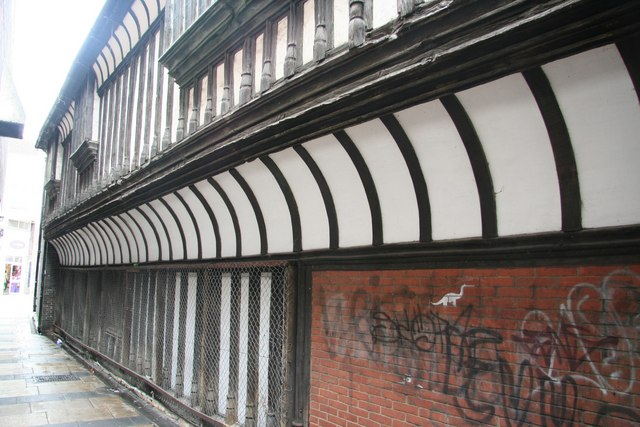
- Whitefriars, 333 High Street, Lincoln

- Location in Lincolnshire
- 53.2262°N 0.5418°W
- Location: In Akrill’s passage, behind the frontage of ABC House Clearance, and express entertainments, music shop. 333 High Street, Lincoln
- OS grid reference: SO1392992455

History
- Built: 16th Century

Site notes
- Architectural style: Timber framed jettied House

Listed Building – Grade II
- Designated: 8 October 1953
- Reference no.: 1388593

Whitefriar or Akrill's Court is a 16th century timber-framed building in Lincoln. It now has a late 20th century shop front, but the timber-framed building survives with the southern front facing the narrow Akrill’s passage, on the east side of the High Street and just to the south of the railway crossing.

== History ==
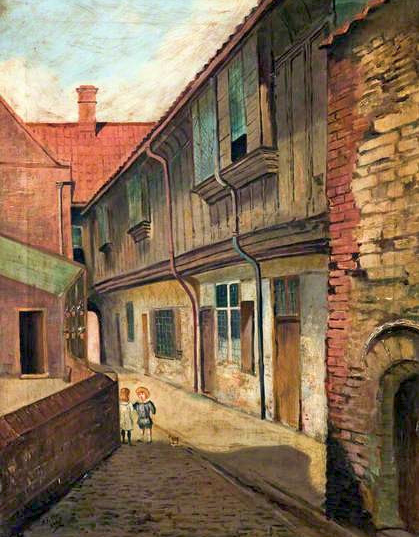
Akrill's Passage, Lincoln by A E Wright, c.1880

Surprisingly little is known about this building. The name Akrill refers to a baker who owned the property in the early part of the 19th century. Padley, who made scaled drawings of the buildings in 1851, said that traditionally it was thought to be part of the White or Carmelite Friary in Lincoln. Adjacent to it at the east end was a small stone building with a Norman arch. As the Carmelite friary has now been shown by archaeological excavation to have been under St Mark's Station, on the opposite side of the High Street, it is unlikely that the building was associated with the friary. It has been alternatively suggested that the Whitefriars was the half-timbered vicarage of St Mary le Wigford church, but there is documentary evidence that in 1563 it was owned by Arthur Hall, an important Grantham merchant – this appears to be the same Arthur Hall who was the MP for Grantham. The building may have been a speculative commercial venture, attracting superior tenants who would sell from the ground floor chamber and live with their family on the first floor. Restoration work was undertaken to the building in 1963.

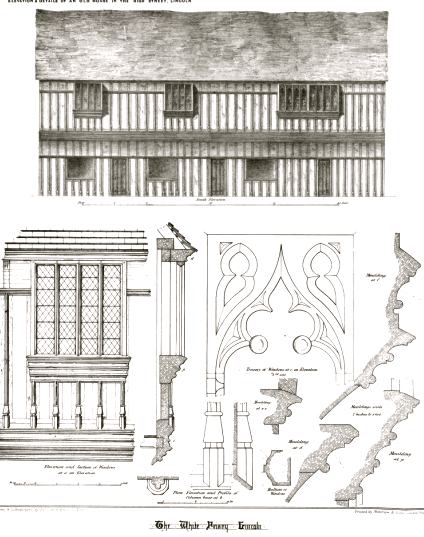
Whitefriars, High Street, Lincoln. By J. S. Padley, 1851

== Description ==
Originally a house dating from the 15th century. The facade faces to the south in a narrow alley-way and the building is at a right angle to the High Street. It has a close studded timber frame of four bays with rendered nogging and a plain tile roof. The first floor is jettied and is coved (curved) outwards with eaves above. South side has moulded uprights. Above, two square wooden oriels on moulded brackets and a 4-light window with wooden mullions and gothic tracery The interior has stud walls with jowled bay posts, two of them with arch braces, and arch braces to the spine beams. Principal rafter roof with collars and spine beam. Two stud walls without nogging.

== Literature ==
- Antram N (revised), Pevsner N & Harris J, (1989), The Buildings of England: Lincolnshire, Yale University Press. pg 525.
- Padley J.S. (1851) Selections from the ancient monastic ecclesiastical and domestic edifices of Lincolnshire, Lincoln
- Stocker D. (ed) (2016), Vernacular Architecture Group, Spring Conference 2016: Lincolnshire, March 29th to April 1st 2016, Society for Lincolnshire History and Archaeology.

== See also - Medieval Domestic Architecture in Lincoln ==
- John of Gaunt’s Palace, Lincoln
