= Coleby, North Kesteven =

Village and civil parish in the North Kesteven district of Lincolnshire, England

Coordinates: 53.133715°N 0.53759°W

Coleby
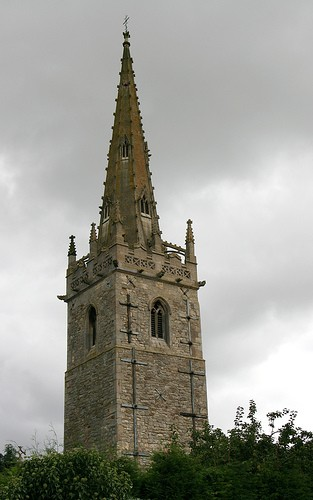
- Church of All Saints, Coleby

- Location within Lincolnshire
- Population: 410 (2011)
- OS grid reference: SK979606
  - London: 115 mi (185 km) SSE
- District: North Kesteven
- Shire county: Lincolnshire
- Region: East Midlands
- Country: England
- Sovereign state: United Kingdom
- Post town: Lincoln
- Postcode district: LN5
- Police: Lincolnshire
- Fire: Lincolnshire
- Ambulance: East Midlands
- UK Parliament: Sleaford and North Hykeham

Coleby is a village and civil parish in the North Kesteven district of Lincolnshire, England. It is situated on the A607, and approximately 6 miles (10 km) south of Lincoln.

== Village ==
Coleby is a settlement documented in the Domesday Book of 1086, and continued as a parish in the ancient wapentake of Boothby Graffoe in the Parts of Kesteven. Coleby is set on the Lincoln Cliff escarpment, with views over the River Witham valley from its western side. The Viking Way, the 146 miles (235 km) long-distance footpath from the Humber Bridge to Oakham, passes through the village. Coleby's population is approximately 600, falling to 410 at the 2011 census.

Coleby has one village public house, the Tempest Arms, which stands at the top of the road that leads up the hill from the valley. The village has a small school typically consisting of fewer than 100 pupils.

== Landmarks ==
=== Church of All Saints ===
Coleby Grade I listed Anglican parish church is dedicated to All Saints. The original church was built by the Anglo-Saxons. This was rebuilt by the Normans and extended, retaining the lower part of the Saxon tower and building upon it. The spire was added in the 15th century. There is a lack of symmetry to the chancel, the arches on the north and south walls do not match and half of an arch has been stopped off. The pews inside the church are not original, they come from a former church at Hackthorn, a village about 14 miles (23 km) to the north, as do two of the windows in the north aisle. The church was restored by F C Penrose in 1864 and the tower was restored in 1901. On the church steeple are landing lights for the nearby RAF Waddington airbase.

=== Coleby Hall ===
Coleby Hall is a Grade II* listed country house which stands near the church in a park of around 50 acres (0.2 km^{2}). It is a gabled house constructed in coursed rubble and ashlar with a red-tiled ridge roof, built in 1628 for Sir William Lister of Rippingale, the father of Thomas Lister (1597–1668). The hall became the property of his nephew, William who was the father of Thomas Lister MP.

After the death of his father, William, the hall was inherited by Thomas Lister, MP (c.1658 – 8 February 1718) who was the great great-nephew of Sir William Lister of Rippingale, and he extended the hall by adding the eastern gable in 1687, On his death, it passed to his eldest daughter, Mary and thence in 1734 to her nephew, Thomas Scrope. Scrope altered and further extended the hall and in 1762 built in the grounds a folly of a Temple to Romulus and Remus (now grade I listed). In 1774 a gateway to the Hall was built as an imitation ruined Roman arch based on Newport Arch in Lincoln. Ownership passed to the Tempest family in 1856 who made major alterations to the hall and estate before selling it on. Eleanor Blanche Tempest, who lived in the Hall from 1894 until her husband's death in 1920, transcribed the parish register of Coleby. The hall was later bought by the Fowkes family, and apart from being requisitioned by the military during the Second World War, remained in their possession until 1981, when it was sold to property developers. In 2000 Coleby Hall consisted of subdivided separate dwellings, each having their own 20th century 20 garden. Currently, in 2023, it consists of a pleasure ground and woodland of 12 hectares surrounding the 17th- and 18th-century house. The stables and coach house both late 18th century buildings grade II listed buildings are also now private dwellings.

=== RAF Coleby Grange ===
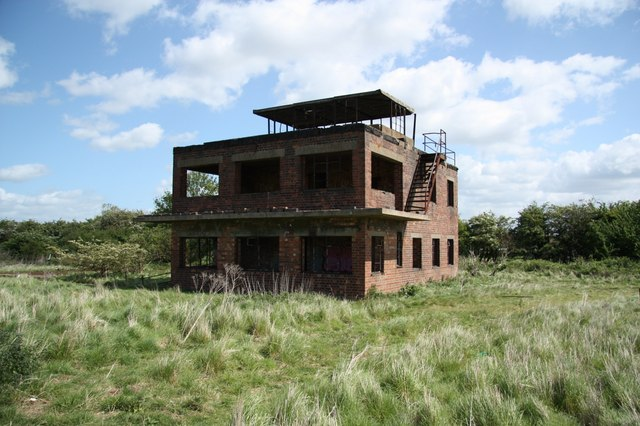
The derelict control tower at RAF Coleby Grange

During the Second World War, the Ministry of Defence constructed an airfield at RAF Coleby Grange to the east of the village on open heathland, immediately west of the A15 road. It opened in 1939 with grass runways as a relief landing ground for RAF Cranwell. In May 1941 it was transferred to 12 Group, RAF Fighter Command and became a satellite station for RAF Digby.

The station re-opened in 1959 as a Thor IRBM launching base; it closed again in 1963. Today the airfield is in private hands and used for agriculture with only the Control Tower, which still stands although in a ruined state, as a visible sign of the station's existence.
