= Thomas Teryng =

English politician

Thomas Teryng (fl. 1414) of Lincoln, was an English politician.

He was elected a member (MP) of the parliament of England for Lincoln in November 1414. He was Mayor of Lincoln for 1420–21.
