= No.410 Squadron RCAF =

410 Tactical Fighter Operational Training Squadron
- 410^{e} Escadron d'entraînement opérationnel à l'appui tactique
- Active: 1941–1945; 1946–1964; 1968–present
- Country: Canada
- Branch: Royal Canadian Air Force
- Type: Tactical fighter operational training
- Size: One squadron
- Part of: 4 Wing Cold Lake
- Garrison/HQ: Cold Lake, Alberta
- Motto: Noctivaga (Latin for 'Wandering by night')
- Battle honours: Defence of Britain, 1941–1944; Fortress Europe, 1943; France and Germany, 1944–1945; Normandy, 1944; Rhine; Biscay, 1943

Commanders
- Notable commanders: Colonel S^{t}-Amand J.P.J., CD

Insignia
- Emblem

- Shoulder Patch

Aircraft flown
- Fighter: CF-18 Hornet

410 Tactical Fighter Operational Training Squadron (French: 410^{e} Escadron d'entraînement opérationnel à l'appui tactique), nicknamed the "Cougars", is a Royal Canadian Air Force aircraft squadron currently at Canada's primary training base for the CF-18 (Canadian Forces version of the McDonnell Douglas F/A-18 Hornet), at Cold Lake, Alberta. The squadron was formed during the Second World War as an RCAF squadron under the Royal Air Force (RAF), at RAF Ayr, near Prestwick, in Scotland.

The first official sortie of No. 410 Squadron was from RAF Drem, East Lothian, Scotland, on the night of 4 June 1942, when twelve Beaufighter crews took off, and it went on to become the top-scoring night fighter squadron in the RAF Second Tactical Air Force during the period between D-Day and VE-Day.

No. 410 Squadron supported the Allied forces during the Normandy Landings and the Battle of the Bulge, flew nightly patrols during this time and many of its pilots gained ace status. Two members of No. 410 Squadron, Flight Lieutenant (F/L) Currie and Flying Officer (F/O) Rose, were the first members of the RCAF to see the German V-2 rocket in flight.

The squadron was disbanded in 1964 but reformed again in 1968.

As No. 410 Tactical Fighter Operational Training Squadron, the squadron usually trains between 20 and 22 pilots a year on the CF-18, more than any other RCAF squadron. The Canadian documentary television series Jetstream was filmed with the squadron in 2007 and showed what trainees must endure to become fighter pilots.

== Badge ==
Sergeant Clarence (Leslie) Elm, CD, was detailed in 1943 by Wing Commander G.H. Elms to design a 410 Squadron badge. The 410 (Cougar) Squadron badge was approved by His Majesty King George VI in 1945. No. 410 Squadron's badge depicts a cougar's face with a background decrescent (waning) moon. The cougar, a North American mountain cat, was chosen because of the speed and power of its attacks. The waning moon refers to the squadron's night operations. These two major devices are in reference to the squadron's Second World War night fighter activities, when the unit was renowned for its skill and number of victories. The squadron's motto is Noctivaga, which means "wandering by night".

== History ==
=== Second World War ===
No. 410 Squadron was formed at RAF Ayr, near Prestwick, Scotland in June 1941, as a Royal Canadian Air Force "Article XV squadron", under Royal Air Force operational control. It was the third RCAF night fighter squadron to be formed and was equipped with the Boulton Paul Defiant. In May 1942 these were replaced by the Bristol Beaufighter, and in October of the same year these were in turn replaced with De Havilland Mosquito Mk IIs, with which the first victory for the squadron was claimed. No. 410 Squadron was acknowledged as the top-scoring night fighter unit in RAF Second Tactical Air Force in the period between D-Day and VE Day, although No. 409 Squadron RCAF can now make a similar claim, on the basis that there were many victories quickly counted up during 1944 and 1945.

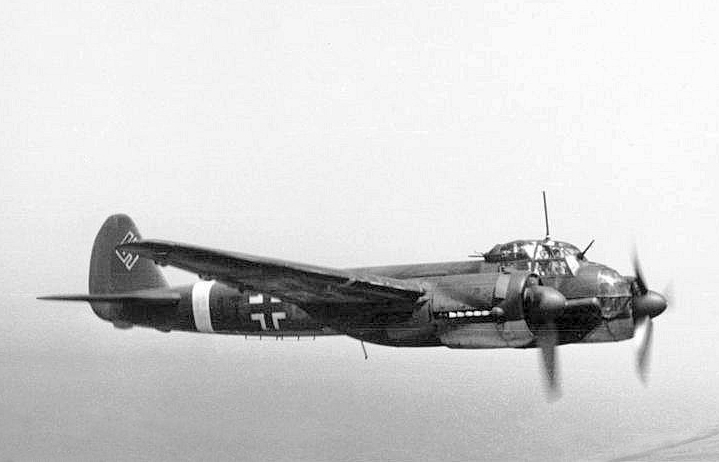
A Junkers Ju 88 in flight, similar to the ones that were shot down by No. 410 Squadron

==== Bases ====
From RAF Ayr, No. 410 Squadron was moved to RAF Drem in East Lothian, but returned to RAF Ayr 10 months later. On 1 September 1942 the squadron was moved to RAF Scorton in North Yorkshire, England, but just under two months after that it was relocated to RAF Acklington in Northumberland. In 1943 the squadron was placed at RAF Coleby Grange in Lincolnshire, then moved for the sixth time to RAF West Malling in the southeast of England, and then to RAF Hunsdon, just north of London. Later it was moved to RAF Castle Camps, and then back to RAF Hunsdon. On 18 June 1944, the squadron was placed at RAF Zeals in Wiltshire, only to be moved again to RAF Colerne in Wiltshire. On 9 September 1944, No. 410 Squadron RCAF was again moved to RAF Hunsdon. Thirteen days later, the squadron was relocated back to their sixth base, RAF Coleby Grange. On 3 November 1944 the Squadron moved to RAF Amiens-Glisy in northern France. Two months later, the squadron was relocated to RAF Lille-Vendeville in northern France, the first movement of the squadron in 1945. From 5 April 1945 the Cougars were back at RAF Amiens-Glisy, and the final move of the war occurred on 9 June 1945, when the squadron relocated to RAF Gilze-Rijen in the Netherlands.

==== Initial operations ====
The first official sortie occurred on the night of 4 June 1942, when twelve crews from No. 410 Squadron took off in Beaufighters, but the two scrambles that occurred were uneventful. The first German contact occurred on the night of 6/7 September 1942, when a Beaufighter II from RAF Scorton flown by P/O R.R. Ferguson and P/O D. Creed (navigator), intercepted a Luftwaffe Ju 88. The Beaufighter was guided to the Ju 88 approximately 20 miles (32 km) northeast of Whitby on the Yorkshire coast. The attack damaged the Ju 88, but did not destroy it. Since the aircraft was not destroyed, this did not count as the squadron's first outright victory. That came on 22 January 1943, when Flight Sergeant B.M. Haight and Sergeant T. Kipling (RAF, observer), flying a Mosquito II from RAF Acklington, were credited with a Dornier Do 217, which was destroyed near Hartlepool. This was made possible because of "night readiness", the ability to fly at a moment's notice at night.

==== D-Day and the invasion of Europe ====
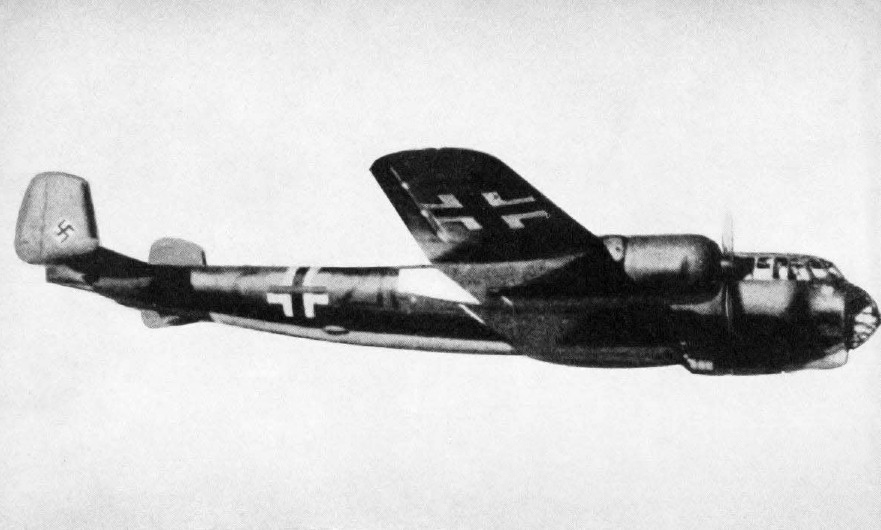
A Dornier Do 217, similar to ones shot down by No. 410 Squadron

Between November 1943 and May 1944, the squadron was engaged in the night defence of Britain. On 5 June 1944, No. 410 Squadron's commanding officer (CO), Wing Commander G.A. Hiltz, flew a four-aircraft detachment to Colerne where they provided fighter cover for the initial airborne landings. Among the pilots who flew that operation was Flight Lieutenant Charles Emanuel "Pop" Edinger, who later became an ace. On the night prior to the Normandy Landings, all of the RAF Second Tactical Air Force's night fighter squadrons were working hard to ensure safety for the landing force. During June 1944, 18 of the squadron's 22 fighters were available; the other four were out for periodic maintenance. At 01:00, the first of four patrols took off, but the patrol was uneventful, with the pilots reporting clouds at 10,000 feet. A further five patrols were flown to help cover the 4,000 ships that were part of Operation Neptune. On 7 June two of the aircraft were fired upon by friendly Lancaster bombers, who assumed they were hostile. However, No. 410 Squadron claimed its first kill when Flying Officers A. Mcleod and Bob Snowdon destroyed a Junkers Ju 188 bomber. On 12 June the squadron claimed multiple bomber kills. The Cougars shot down 14 raiders with five more probably destroyed or damaged. But the success was overshadowed by the allied invasion of Europe. From June to August 1944, the squadron was mostly occupied with nightly patrols over the beachheads to guard the Allied troops and shipping against German bombers. No. 410 Squadron's Mosquitoes brought down thirty-one German aircraft and damaged or destroyed three more, in less than 31 sorties. Then the squadron moved to France and in the next eight months added 25 kills and 1 damaged to its score.

For several days following D-Day, the squadron flew patrols and received credits for many kills. In one instance, Warrant Officer (W/O) W.F. Price and P/O J.G. Costello shot down two Dornier Do 217 bombers in the space of twenty minutes. and the Cougars destroyed twelve German bombers in all. Following this success, however, it was five days before the squadron scored another kill. In the interval, the crews, still maintaining their schedule of nine sorties per night, had little to report. One night an engine in W/C Hiltz's Mosquito failed on the take-off run and the aircraft, swerving off the runway, crashed into "A" Flight dispersal. The crews escaped injury, but many buildings went up in flames. During an operation that resulted in the thirteenth kill of the period, one aircraft crashed and its crew was unable to bail out. For the next week the weather was poor, which restricted night operations. Most of the crews that did go out had to be diverted to other bases on their return. German activity had also diminished by then and the beachhead was much quieter than it had been in mid-June. On the first two nights in July there were no sorties at all. Then the weather improved and the nightly round of nine patrols was resumed.

F/L Currie and F/O Rose saw a V-2 rocket in flight on the night of 10/11 September, the first Canadian pilots to do so. While on patrol from Brussels to Antwerp and Rotterdam they saw a bright orange light directly ahead and seemingly at their own altitude, 10,000 feet (3,000 m). At first glance, Currie paid no attention to it, taking it for a bright star. Suddenly, Currie said: "It began to climb – hell it climbed!" The light appeared to go straight up so rapidly that within a few seconds it had passed out of sight. On return to base, the crew reported the sighting as a V-1 flying bomb, but their account of the spectacular rate of climb and other details aroused great interest amongst senior officers. That night, a few moments after Currie and Rose had made their sighting, a V-2 rocket crashed onto the English coast. Two nights later, F/Os Fullerton and Gallagher saw a similar ball of yellow flame streak vertically into the night sky, and in the weeks that followed there were many other reports.

==== Battle of the Bulge and the end of the war ====
In the middle of December, under bad weather conditions, the Nazis launched an offensive in the Ardennes. The Luftwaffe caught many squadrons off guard. No. 410 Squadron enjoyed a number of successes during this period, some of them even on Christmas Day. During the Battle of the Bulge, the entire RAF Second Tactical Air Force, including No. 410 Squadron, was on 48-hour alert.

Although the war was entering its final stages, the squadron still had to watch for anti-aircraft artillery. The fighter squadrons continued to make advances until February, while waiting for the Canadian push through the Reichwald. Although there was some aerial fighting, the major conflict with the Luftwaffe occurred when the Canadians started to cross the Rhine on 24 March 1945.

On the evening of 18 December 1944, during the Battle of the Bulge, Edinger made contact with a Ju 87, which he then fired upon. His navigator, C.L. Vaessen, confirmed the kill, stating that the aircraft had been hit in the starboard engine and had caught fire. The Ju 87 crashed into trees and was engulfed in flames. Flight Lieutenant Rayne Schultz had claimed his fifth kill of the war, a Ju 188, on 13/14 February 1944. After having returned from working at the Training Command, he claimed another Ju 188 on 10/11 April 1945. He claimed his final kills on 21/22 April 1945 by downing two Ju 88s near Ferrbellen.

A few days after the Squadron had moved to Lille/Vendeville, it was called upon to provide a special patrol of four aircraft as air cover for the Armistice Day ceremonies being held in Paris; no German intruders attempted to intervene. Later in the month, there was an accident at base that took the lives of two pilots who had recently joined the Cougars. F/Os H. Connelly and J. Hunt had gone up together to practice circuits and landings. As they made a circuit, preparatory to landing, the Mosquito stalled and crashed from 500 feet (150 m). A few days before Christmas 1944, there was another accident, the heaviest suffered by the squadron in terms of lives lost. For several days the airfield had been fogbound and when the sky cleared somewhat in the afternoon of 21 December, S/L Fulton, "B" Flight commander, took off for England in the squadron's Airspeed Oxford aircraft. With him were three officers and two airmen, all going on leave. Near Wrotham, Kent, the aircraft crashed and only one of its occupants survived. Killed with S/L Fulton were his navigator F/O A.R. Ayton (RAF), who had accompanied him on posting to the Cougars in October, F/L F.G. Thomson, DFC (RAF), who had arrived late in November to begin a second tour, and LACs E. Wahlers and R. Seefried. F/O W. Rumbold, another RAF navigator, was seriously injured; he had been with the Squadron for two months.

By the end of the war, 75 3/4 victories had been claimed. The squadron flew 2,972 sorties and accumulated 28,150 hours of flight time. The squadron's victories included 75 3/4 destroyed, 2 probably destroyed, and 9 damaged. The squadron had the following operational casualties: 17 aircraft and 32 aircrew, of whom 10 were killed, 20 presumed dead, and two were made prisoners of war. Non-operational casualties were: 14 aircraft and 30 personnel, of whom 29 were killed, 1 injured. The squadron was disbanded at the end of the war on 9 June 1945.

==== Wartime commanders ====
The first officer to command No. 410 Squadron was Squadron Leader P.Y. Davoud, who was in charge between 30 June 1941 and 4 September 1941. Wing Commander (W/C) M. Lipton took over command between 5 September 1941 and 30 July 1942 and the position was then given to W/C F.W. Hillock, between 19 August 1942 and 19 May 1943, and then to W/C G.H. Elms, who commanded No. 410 Squadron between 20 May 1943 and 18 February 1944. In the latter part of the war, W/C G.A. Hiltz was given command between 19 February 1944 and 1 April 1945. The last commander of the war was W/C E.P. Heybroek, who was in charge between 2 April 1945 until the squadron disbanded in June of that year.

==== Decorations ====
During the Second World War, No. 410 Squadron RCAF was awarded multiple battle honours. These honours are certified by the Canadian Air Force.

Battle honours awarded to No. 410 Squadron RCAF
Award	Year(s)	Additional Info
Defence of Britain	1941–44	Battle of Britain
Fortress Europe	1943	for operations against targets in Germany, Italy and enemy-occupied Europe
France and Germany	1944–45	ops over France and Germany prior to and after D-day
Normandy	1944	Normandy 1944
Rhine	1945	Rhine 1945
Biscay	1940–45	Biscay 1943

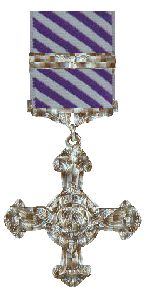
A DFC with bar

At least 12 members of the squadron were decorated during the war, with the award of 11 Distinguished Flying Crosses (DFC) and one bar to the DFC, as well as a Distinguished Flying Medal (DFM). The first DFCs went to Acting Flight Lieutenant Martin Anthony Cybulski and Flying Officer Harold Herbert Ladbrook on 9 November 1943 The citation does not mention that they had to return to base on a single engine, and with other damage to the aircraft. This was quickly followed by Flying Officers Rayne Dennis Schultz and Vernon Albert Williams on 14 January 1944. Again, the citation does not mention the severe damage to their aircraft. At the close of an action with their third Do 217, which the combat report describes as: "a long duel with the enemy pilot showing a high degree of airmanship," they were hit by return fire, including a cannon shell that destroyed much of the instrument panel and which narrowly missed the pilot. The starboard engine almost died, then recovered, but then the port engine caught fire. They managed to return to RAF Bradwell with only the starboard engine working, landing at 19:45 on 10 December 1943.

Sergeant James Norman was awarded the DFM on 26 September 1944. Squadron Leader James Dean Somerville and F/O George Douglas Robinson were awarded the DFC on 20 October 1944. F/L Charles Emanuel Edinger and F/O Charles Leo Vaessen were awarded the DFC on 5 December of the same year, for destroying two Junkers Ju 188s, one Junkers Ju 88 and one unidentified German aircraft between June and October. They subsequently claimed one further Ju 88 and one Junkers Ju 87 in December.

Flight Lieutenants Ben Erwin Plumer and William Warren Hargrove received the DFC on 15 December 1944 for shooting down a Messerschmitt Bf 110 on 6 October: F/O Dennis George Tongue was awarded the DFC on 29 December 1944, and a bar to his DFC on 2 March 1945. F/O Tongue was a member of the RAF, had been commissioned from sergeant and promoted to flying officer. On the night he won the bar to his DFC, on 25 November 1944, his pilot was A. A. Harrington of the United States Army Air Forces. They destroyed three Junkers Ju 88s, their own Mosquito having been hit by debris from the second Ju 88, and during the fight that led to the downing of the third, Tongue was also having to keep track of a further Ju 88 which was endeavouring to attack their aircraft.

F/O Donald Murdo Mackenzie was awarded the DFC on 27 February 1945, having destroyed a Ju 88 on 30 July 1944, and then two more in a single sortie on 24 December.

=== 1946–1964 ===
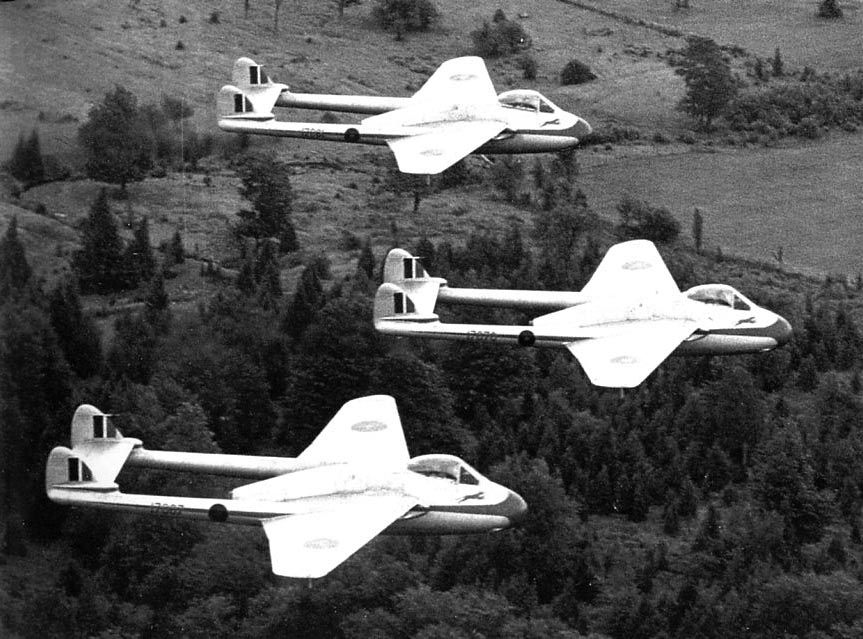
Vampires of 410 Squadron's Blue Devils aerobatic team

No. 410 Squadron was reactivated on 1 December 1946 as an air defence squadron flying de Havilland Vampire F.3 aircraft, and was re-formed from a defence role into that of a fighter role at St Hubert (Montreal), Quebec on 1 December 1948. From May 1949 to August 1951, the Blue Devils aerobatics team formed, to demonstrate the abilities of the new Vampire aircraft at formation flying. The squadron later converted to Canadair Sabres and was deployed to Europe, flying from RCAF Station North Luffenham in the UK, and then at RCAF Station Marville (No. 1 (Fighter) Wing) in France. The squadron had been the first regular force fighter unit to fly the Vampire aircraft and was the first to fly the Sabre and the first to join No. 1 (Fighter) Wing of No. 1 Air Division Europe.

When No. 445 All Weather (Fighter) [AW(F)] Squadron arrived from Canada, however, No. 410 Squadron was deactivated at Marville on 1 October 1956 and reactivated as an all-weather fighter squadron at Uplands (Ottawa), Ontario on 1 November of that year, flying Avro Canada CF-100s. When CF-100s were removed from front-line service in 1961, the CF-101 Voodoo interceptor was introduced for North American air defence. No. 410 Squadron converted to these aircraft and the squadron continued to fly Voodoos until defence cuts led to the squadron being deactivated on 31 March 1964.

=== 1968 to the present-day ===
In 1968, No. 3 OTU (Operating Training Unit) at CFB Bagotville, tasked with training pilots and navigators for the three operational RCAF Voodoo squadrons, was later renamed No. 410 Squadron. No. 410 Squadron moved to Cold Lake, Alberta in 1982, changing aircraft to become the training unit for Canada's new CF-18 Hornet aircraft.

== Aircraft ==
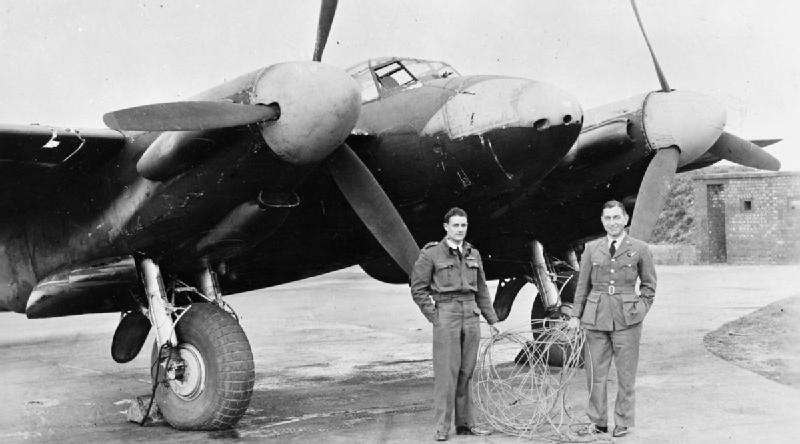
A de Havilland Mosquito of No. 410 Squadron

=== Second World War ===
No. 410 Squadron began flying the North American Harvard training aircraft and then flew the Boulton Paul Defiant from July 1941 to May 1942. The Boulton Paul Defiant was a "turret fighter" that was used as a night fighter. A problem with this aircraft was that it had no forward armament, and so it was exchanged for the Bristol Beaufighter II, long-range heavy fighter. The Beaufighter was used from April 1942 until January 1943. The Mk II used the Rolls-Royce Merlin engine which provided greater power than the original Beaufighter had had. No. 410 Squadron transitioned to the de Havilland Mosquito Mk II in November 1942, and the Squadron then used the Mosquito exclusively until the end of the war. It used the variants VI (July 1943 – September 1943), XIII (December 1943 – August 1944), and XXX (August 1944 – June 1945). All of these fighters had the same basic design—that of a low- to medium-altitude daytime tactical bomber, high altitude night bomber, pathfinder, day or night fighter, fighter-bomber, intruder, maritime strike and photo reconnaissance aircraft.

=== 1946–1964 ===
The squadron became a fighter unit in 1948, flying the de Havilland Vampire, having already flown the aircraft for two years in an Air Defence role.

No. 410 Squadron then re-equipped with the Canadair Sabre in 1951 and then with the Avro Canada CF-100 Canuck in 1956.

On 20 December 1961, No. 410 Squadron became Canada's first operational CF-101 Voodoo squadron. The Voodoo was an all-weather interceptor aircraft; its primary armament was the nuclear-tipped AIR-2A Genie unguided air-to-air rockets, and was used as Canada's primary means of air defence.

=== 1968 to the present-day ===
As a training unit, No. 410 Squadron used the Canadair CT-133 Silver Star.

No. 410 Squadron RCAF is currently equipped (2011) with the CF-18 Hornet. The first two CF-18s were formally handed over to 410 (Operational Training Unit) Squadron at CFB Cold Lake, Alberta on 25 October 1982.

== Operational training ==
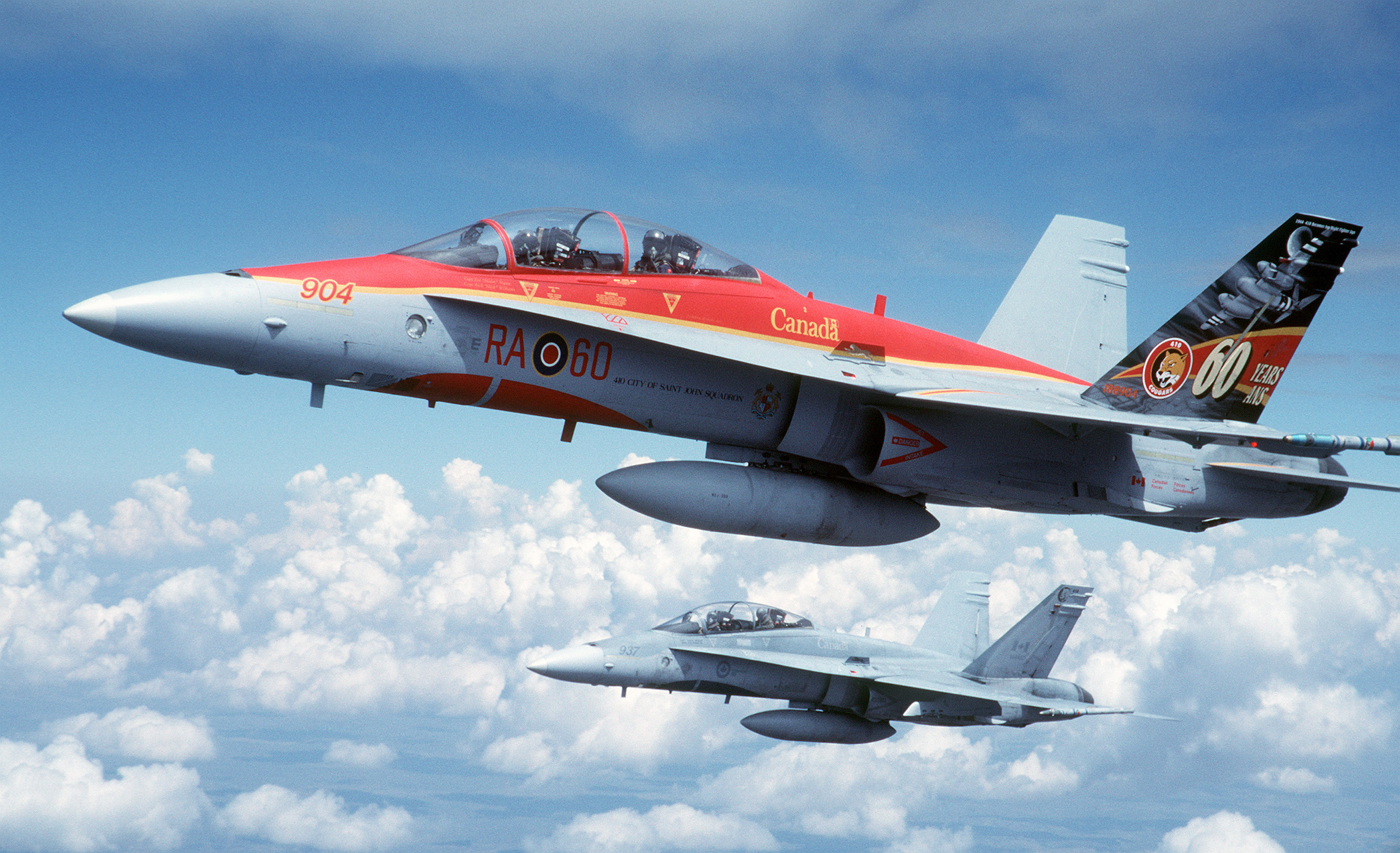
CF-18 Hornets from 410 Squadron (2001).

No. 410 Squadron is now (2010) a Royal Canadian Air Force aircraft squadron at Canada's primary CF-18 training base at Cold Lake, Alberta. In 1982, the squadron was renamed 410 Tactical Fighter (Operational Training) Squadron. It runs one fighter pilot course every year, training approximately 20 pilots. The training program consists of nine months of ground school, simulator flights, and operational flying. Students are taken from among the graduates of a Fighter Lead-In Training Course and are provided with the knowledge of basic skills in both air-to-air and air-to-ground combat. Areas covered in depth include aircraft handling, instrument flight, formation flying, night flying, navigation, air-to-air refuelling, and weapons delivery and tactics.

There is also an annual Fighter Weapons Instructor Course (FWIC) run by No. 410 Squadron, and a Fighter Electronic Warfare and Advanced Radar (FEWAR) Course. The intense and highly challenging FWIC lasts for three months. Each operational CF-18 squadron and tactical radar squadron sends candidates (eight students per course) who graduate with the leadership qualities and expertise required to return to their squadrons and design tactical training programs themselves. The Advanced Radar Course is conducted in two phases: ground school at 4 Wing, Cold Lake, and a flying phase at an electronic warfare range. This three-week course is designed to allow ten pilots annually to graduate and return to their squadrons as electronic warfare experts and instructors. Since No. 410 Squadron has always had some of the most experienced CF-18 pilots in the fighter community, it is often charged with carrying out special fighter projects. The squadron conducted the operational testing and evaluation of the CF's precision guided munitions, and in 2010 was anticipating testing the use of night vision devices in the Hornet.

== Re-certification and curriculum ==
For the first seven years following 1982, when the CF-18 was being delivered, the squadron ran six-month full-squadron courses from which the graduating pilots formed new CF-18 squadrons. Following this initial cadre of courses, No. 410 Squadron trained CF-18 pilots at a rate of approximately 50 per year. In 1992, with the closure of three squadrons in Germany, this was reduced to 25. With the recent reduction in size of the remaining operational squadrons, No. 410 Squadron now trains approximately 20 fighter pilots annually.

At the same time as the current work mandate, No. 410 Squadron is also responsible for training and re-certifying about five former CF-18 Hornet pilots annually. These pilots are returning to the CF-18 after a ground or exchange tour. No. 410 Squadron also trains newly arrived foreign exchange officers who will be joining one of Canada's two operational fighter squadrons. As backgrounds can differ significantly, each course is tailored to the individual, based on their experience and demonstrated competencies. Areas covered in depth in the Fighter Pilot Course (FPC) include basic and advanced aircraft handling, instrument flight, formation flying, night flying, all-weather interception, air-to-air refuelling, Basic Fighter Manoeuvres (BFM – "dogfighting skills") and air combat. The latter half of each FPC comprises academic air-to-ground weapons delivery and Close Air Support (CAS), as well as advanced Air Interdiction (AI) tactics, the former usually completed during a squadron deployment to the south-western United States in the late spring and early fall, due to the significantly better weather and the sheer number of bombing ranges available.

== Fighter Operational Test and Evaluation Flight ==
A sub-unit of No. 410 Squadron is the Fighter Operational Test and Evaluation Flight (FOTEF), which is responsible for operational testing and evaluation. In 2010, its efforts were seen as integral to the operational effectiveness of all aspects of core and CF-18 capabilities. Some of the new systems being evaluated were Night Vision Imaging Systems (NVIS), Multi-function Information Distribution Systems (MIDS), the Advanced Multi-role Infra-Red Sensor, and the evaluation of new mission planning software and the Advanced Distributed Combat Training System. Working closely with a variety of key units across the Air Force, including the "Aerospace Engineering & Test Establishment" (AETE), FOTEF enabled the integration of newly modernized CF-18 ECP-583 R2 aircraft into the Fighter Force.

== Jetstream and air displays ==
The Canadian documentary television series Jetstream was filmed in 2007, showing life on the base at Cold Lake and what a trainee must endure to become a fighter pilot. The television documentary followed No. 410 Squadron's training course for the full nine months, and in that time some candidates did not graduate. The television show was given full access to the trainees' lives from ground school to graduation and was allowed access almost everywhere. The series followed six members of the Canadian Air Force's "Class of 2006" who had been selected to learn with No. 410 Squadron. The television show called the air base "fighter town", but Cold Lake has three fighter (including the 410th) squadrons that use fighter/interceptor aircraft, them being 401 Tactical Fighter Squadron and No. 409 Squadron, nicknamed "The Nighthawks".
