= William Yates (died 1558 or 1559) =

English politician

William Yates (c. 1505 – 1558 or 1559) was an English politician born in Lincoln, England. He was a Member (MP) of the Parliament of England for Lincoln in 1545.

== Early life ==
William Yates was born in Lincoln, England, to John and Elizabeth Yates in 1505. It is likely that his family had lived in Lincoln since the early reign of Henry VIII.

== Political career ==
Yates was elected to his first public position—sheriff of Lincoln—in 1526. He was elected an alderman by 1539 and Mayor of Lincoln for 1539–40 and 1549–50.

In 1541, he served as a member of the grand jury before which Thomas Culpeper and Francis Dereham were tried. Yates was elected to Parliament in 1545. Although he ran again in 1547, he was never re-elected.

He was married with 2 sons.
