= John Sutton of Lincoln =

Member of the Parliament of England

John Sutton of Lincoln (died c. 1391) was a Member of Parliament (MP) of the Parliament of England for Lincoln in 1369, 1372, 1373, October 1377 and February 1388. His brother Robert Sutton and his nephew Hamon Sutton were also MPs for Lincoln.

He was the Mayor of the Boston Staple for 1375–76 and 1384–85 and Mayor of Lincoln for 1386–87.
