= John Belasise =

English politician

John Belasise (fl. 1393–1411), of Lincoln, was an English politician.

He was elected Mayor of Lincoln for 1394–1395 and a member (MP) of the parliament of England for Lincoln in 1393 and 1411.
