= William Blyton (fl. 1399–1402) =

English politician

William Blyton, (fl. 1399–1402) of Lincoln and Foxton and Shepreth, Cambridgeshire, was an English politician.

He was a member (MP) of the parliament of England for Lincoln 1399 and 1402. He was also Mayor of Lincoln for 1401–02 and 1422–23.
