= Lincoln Castle =

Castle in eastern England built by 11th-century Norman invaders

- Lincolnshire
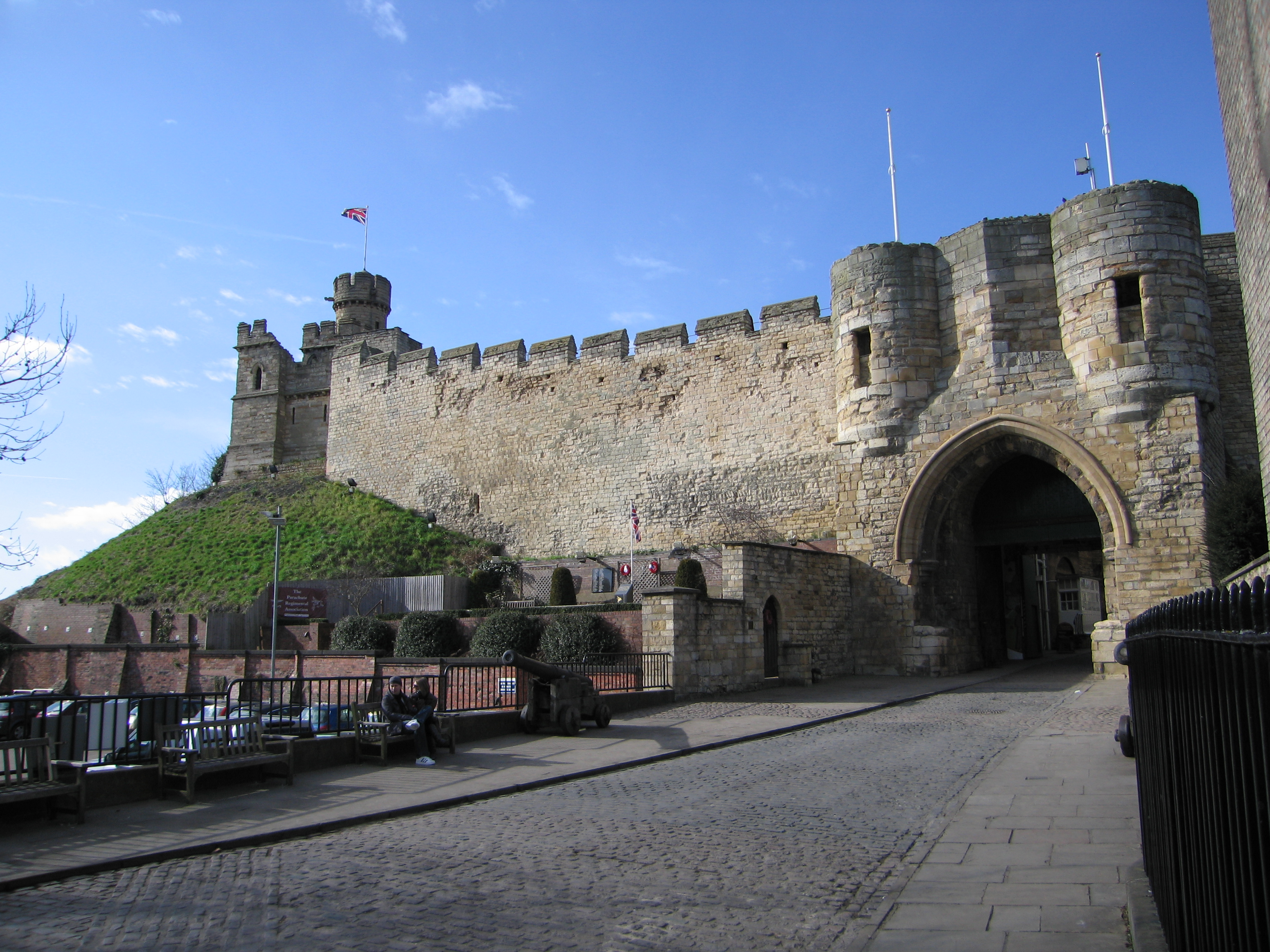
- View of Lincoln Castle

Site information
- Type: Norman
- Open to the public: Every day

Location
- Shown within Lincolnshire
- Coordinates: 53.23529°N 0.54095°W

Site history
- Built: 11th century
- Built by: William the Conqueror
- In use: Prison and law court
- Materials: Stone
- Battles/wars: The Anarchy; First Battle of Lincoln (1141); First Barons' War; Second Battle of Lincoln (1217)

Scheduled monument
- Official name: Lincoln Castle (except modern buildings)
- Reference no.: 1005049

Listed Building – Grade I
- Official name: Lincoln Castle
- Designated: 15 August 1973
- Reference no.: 1388491

Listed Building – Grade II
- Reference no.: 1388492 – Bath House; 1388493 – Statue of George III
- Website: http://www.lincolncastle.com/

Lincoln Castle is a major medieval castle constructed in Lincoln, England, during the late 11th century by William the Conqueror on the site of a pre-existing Roman fortress. The castle is unusual in that it has two mottes. It is one of only two such castles in the country, the other being at Lewes in East Sussex. Lincoln Castle remained in use as a prison and court into modern times and is one of the better preserved castles in England; the Crown Courts continue to this day.

The castle is open to the public most days of the week and possible to walk around the walls from which there are views of the castle complex, cathedral, the city, and surrounding countryside. Displayed within the castle is one of only four surviving exemplars of the 1215 issue of Magna Carta. The castle is now owned by Lincolnshire County Council and is a scheduled monument.

== History ==
=== Early history ===
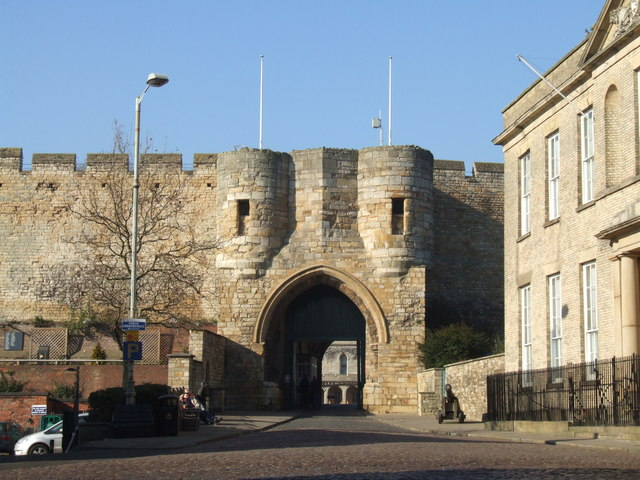
The exterior of the east gate

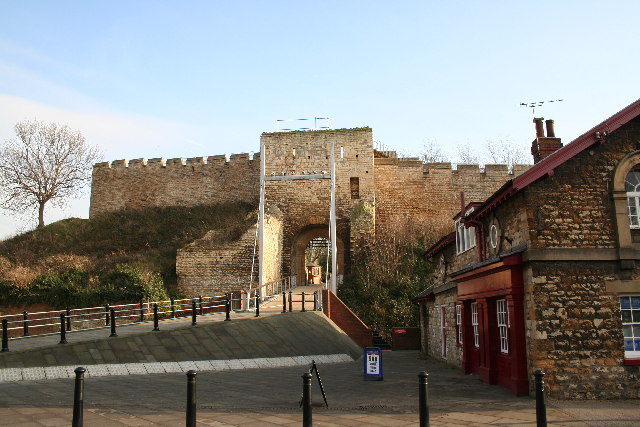
The exterior of the west gate, which was rebuilt in the 1230s. Blocked for centuries, it was re-opened as recently as 1992

After William the Conqueror defeated Harold Godwinson and the English at the Battle of Hastings on 14 October 1066, he continued to face resistance to his rule in the north of England. For a number of years, William's position was very insecure. In order to project his influence northwards to control the people of the Danelaw (an area that had for a time been under the control of Scandinavian settlers), he constructed a number of major castles in the North and Midlands of England: including those at Cambridge, Huntingdon, Lincoln, Nottingham, Warwick and York.

When William reached Lincoln (one of the country's major settlements), he found a Viking commercial and trading centre with a population of 6,000 to 8,000. The remains of the old Roman walled fortress of Lindum Colonia (source of the name 'Lincoln'), located 60 metres (200 ft) above the countryside to the south and west, proved an ideal strategic position to construct a new castle. Lincoln was also a vital strategic crossroads of the following routes (largely the same routes which influenced the siting of the Roman fort):

- Ermine Street – a major Roman road and England's main north–south route, connecting London and York.
- Fosse Way – another important Roman route connecting Lincoln with the city of Leicester and the south-west of England.
- The valley of the River Trent (to the west and southwest) – a major river affording access to the River Ouse, and thus the major city of York.
- The River Witham – a waterway connected to the River Trent (via the Fossdyke Roman canal at Torksey) and to the North Sea via The Wash.
- The Lincolnshire Wolds – an upland area to the northeast of Lincoln, which overlooks the Lincolnshire Marsh beyond.

A castle here could guard several of the main strategic routes and form part of a network of strongholds of the Norman kingdom, in the former Danish Mercia, roughly the area today referred to as the East Midlands, to control the country internally.

The Domesday Survey of 1086 directly records 48 castles in England, with two in Lincolnshire including one in Lincoln. Building a castle within an existing settlement sometimes meant existing structures had to be removed: of the castles noted in the Domesday Book, thirteen included references to property being destroyed to make way for the castle. In Lincoln's case 166 "unoccupied residences" were pulled down to clear the area on which the castle would be built.

Work on the new fortification was completed in 1068. Probably at first a wooden keep was constructed, which was later replaced with a much stronger stone one. Lincoln Castle is very unusual in having two mottes, the only other surviving example of such a design being at Lewes. To the south, where the Roman wall stands on the edge of a steep slope, it was retained partially as a curtain wall and partially as a revetment retaining the mottes. In the west, where the ground is more level, the Roman wall was buried within an earth rampart and extended upward to form the Norman castle wall. The Roman west gate (on the same site as the castle's west gate) was excavated in the 19th century but began to collapse on exposure, and so was re-buried.

The castle was the focus of attention during the First Battle of Lincoln on 2 February 1141, during the struggle between King Stephen and Empress Matilda over who should be monarch in England. A new tower, called the Lucy Tower, was built on the site.

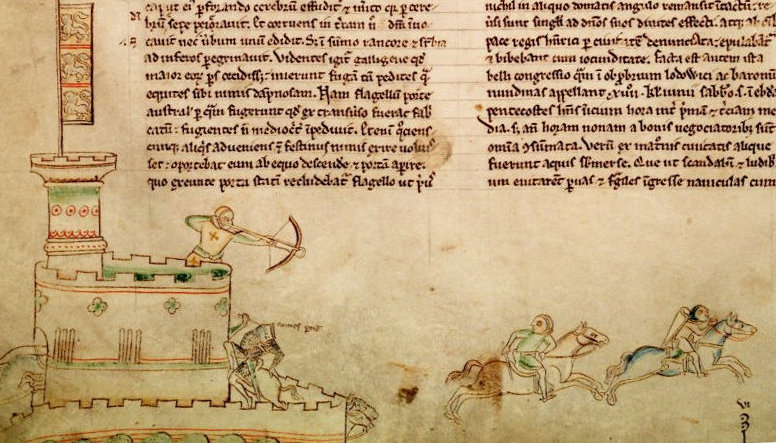
Lincoln Castle (left), shown during the Second Battle of Lincoln, as illustrated by Matthew Paris.

Lincoln Castle was again besieged before the Second Battle of Lincoln, on 20 May 1217, during the reign of Henry III of England during the course of the First Barons' War. This was the period of political struggle that followed the sealing of Magna Carta on 15 June 1215. After this, a new barbican was built onto the west and east gates. In 1375, one Agatha Lovel – "notoriously suspect" in the murder of her master, Sir William de Cantilupe – escaped justice by bribing her Lincoln Castle gaolers, where she had been imprisoned awaiting trial. The bailiffs, Thomas Thornhaugh and John Bate, were later arrested and tried for allowing Agatha to escape justice, but were either pardoned or acquitted.

=== Later history ===
As in Norwich and other places, the castle was used as a secure site in which to establish a gaol (prison; jail). At Lincoln, the gaol was built in 1787 and extended in 1847 – the 1787 Governor's House and the 1847 Prison are now Grade II* heritage listed buildings. The old prison is a three-storey stone building with 15 bays, and is connected to the 18th-century Governor's House via a single-storey prison chapel.

Imprisoned debtors were allowed some social contact, but the regime for criminals was designed to be one of isolation, according to the separate system. Consequently, the seating in the prison chapel is designed to enclose each prisoner individually so that the preacher could see everyone but each could see only him. By 1878 the system was discredited and the inmates were transferred to the new gaol in the eastern outskirts of Lincoln. The prison in the castle was left without a use until the Lincolnshire Archives were housed in its cells.

William Marwood, the 19th-century hangman, carried out his first execution at Lincoln. He used the long drop, designed to break the victim's neck rather than to strangle him, to execute Fred Horry in 1872. Until 1868, prisoners were publicly hanged on the mural tower at the north-east corner of the curtain wall, overlooking the upper town.

Parts of the prison are open as a museum, including the 19th-century chapel which is claimed to be the only one remaining in the world designed for the separate system (each seat enclosed). The prison has been used as a filming location, for example for the ITV television series Downton Abbey.

In 2012 the "Lincoln Castle Revealed" project, a three-year programme of renovation, began at the castle. Work involved creating a new exhibition centre in which to display Lincoln's copy of Magna Carta, building visitor facilities, and opening sections of the prison within the castle to the public. The scheme was completed in April 2015 to coincide with the 800th anniversary of the sealing of Magna Carta. The Lincoln Castle Magna Carta is one of the four surviving originals, sealed by King John after his meeting with the Barons at Runnymede in 1215, and is accompanied by an exhibition explaining the origin of the Magna Carta and its far-reaching effects.

== Layout and architecture ==
Lincoln Castle is bounded by a stone curtain wall, with ditches on all sides except the south. From an early stage, the outer walls which enclose the site were built in stone and they date from before 1115. On the south side the walls are interrupted by two earthen mounds called mottes. One is in the south-east corner, and was probably an original feature of William's the Conqueror's castle, while the other occupies the south-west corner. A square tower, the Observatory Tower, stands on top of the first mound, standing above the outer walls to dominate the city of Lincoln. The second mound is crowned by the 'Lucy Tower', which was probably built in the 12th century and was named after Lucy of Bolingbroke, the Countess of Chester until 1138.

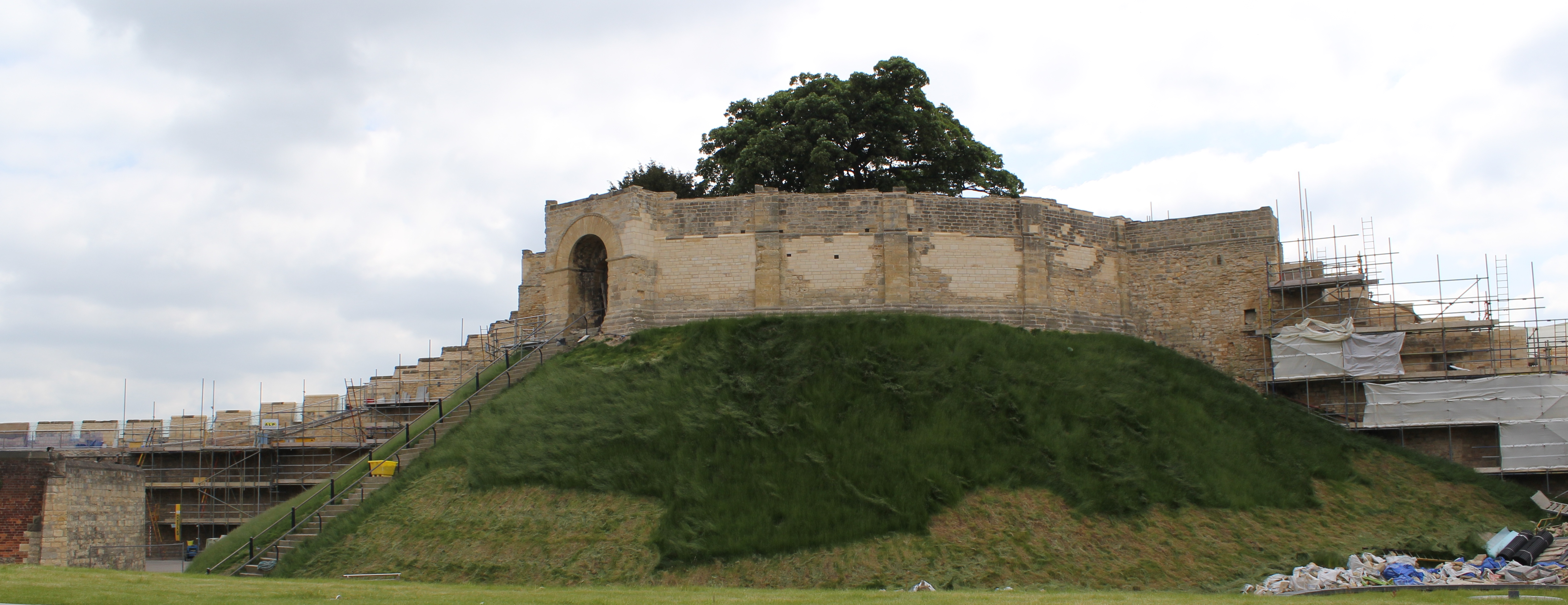
The Lucy Tower in 2013, at which point the castle was undergoing a programme of renovation.

The grounds contain remains of Lincoln's Eleanor cross, an oriel window moved from Sutton Hall and incorporated into the main gate, and the bust of George III from the Dunston Pillar.

On the western side of the castle site is an ivy-clad building built in 1823 as the Assize courts. This is still used today as Lincoln Crown Court.

In addition, two dragons, Lucy and Norman, were placed in the right hand corner of the grounds next to Cob Hall Tower. Lucy, who was named after the Lucy Tower, was placed on 2 April 2022; Norman, who was named after the 1068 Norman conquests, was placed on 24 June 2023.

== Other defences ==
Other medieval defensive works in Lincoln have been recorded, but are no longer extant.

- A set of earth banks, associated with one or other of the sieges, once stood where the Lawns stand, to the west of the castle.
- Thorngate Castle once stood near the river, forming the South-East corner of the city walls. It existed in 1141 but was demolished in 1151.

== Gallery ==
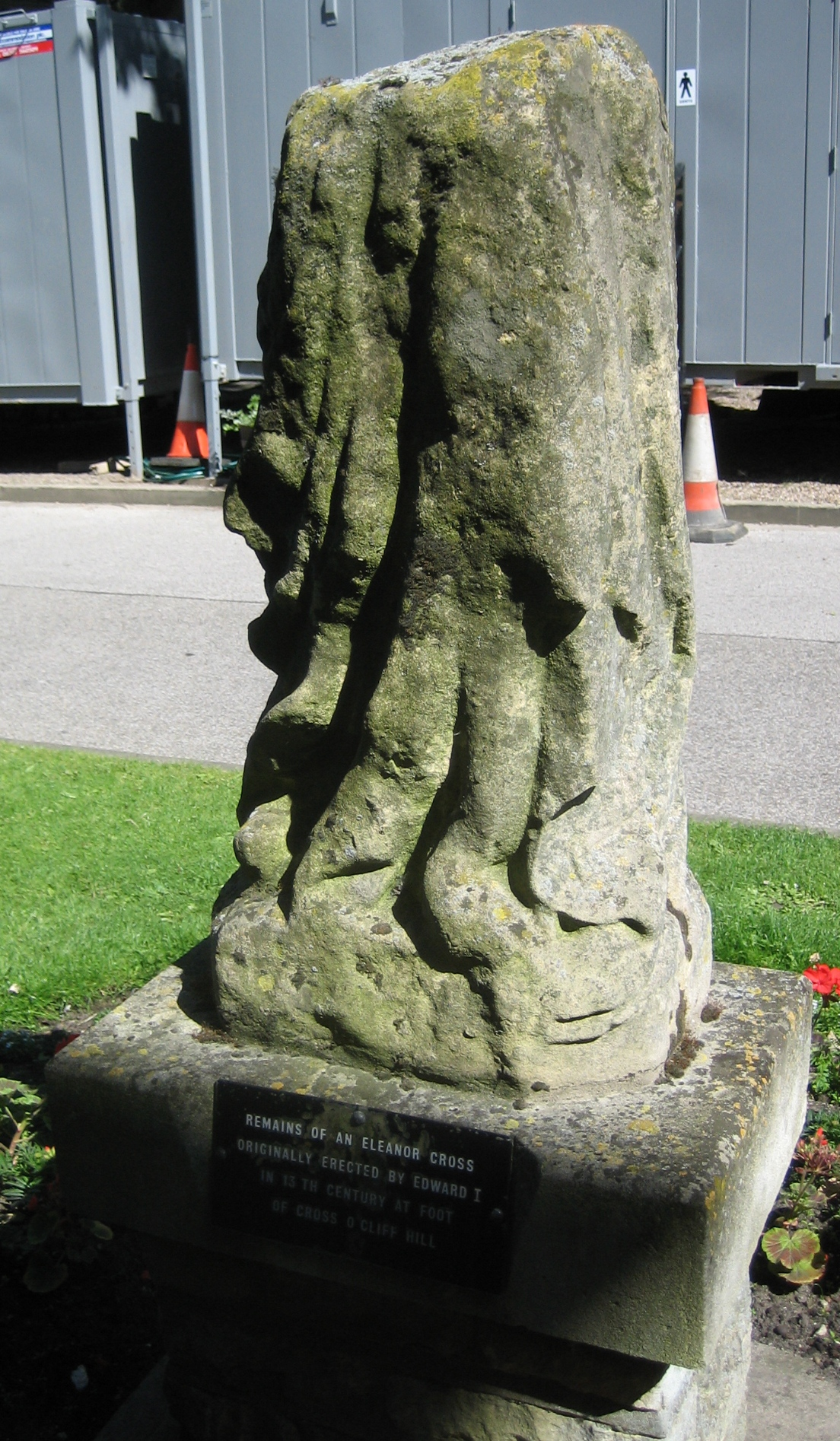
Remnant of Lincoln's Eleanor Cross

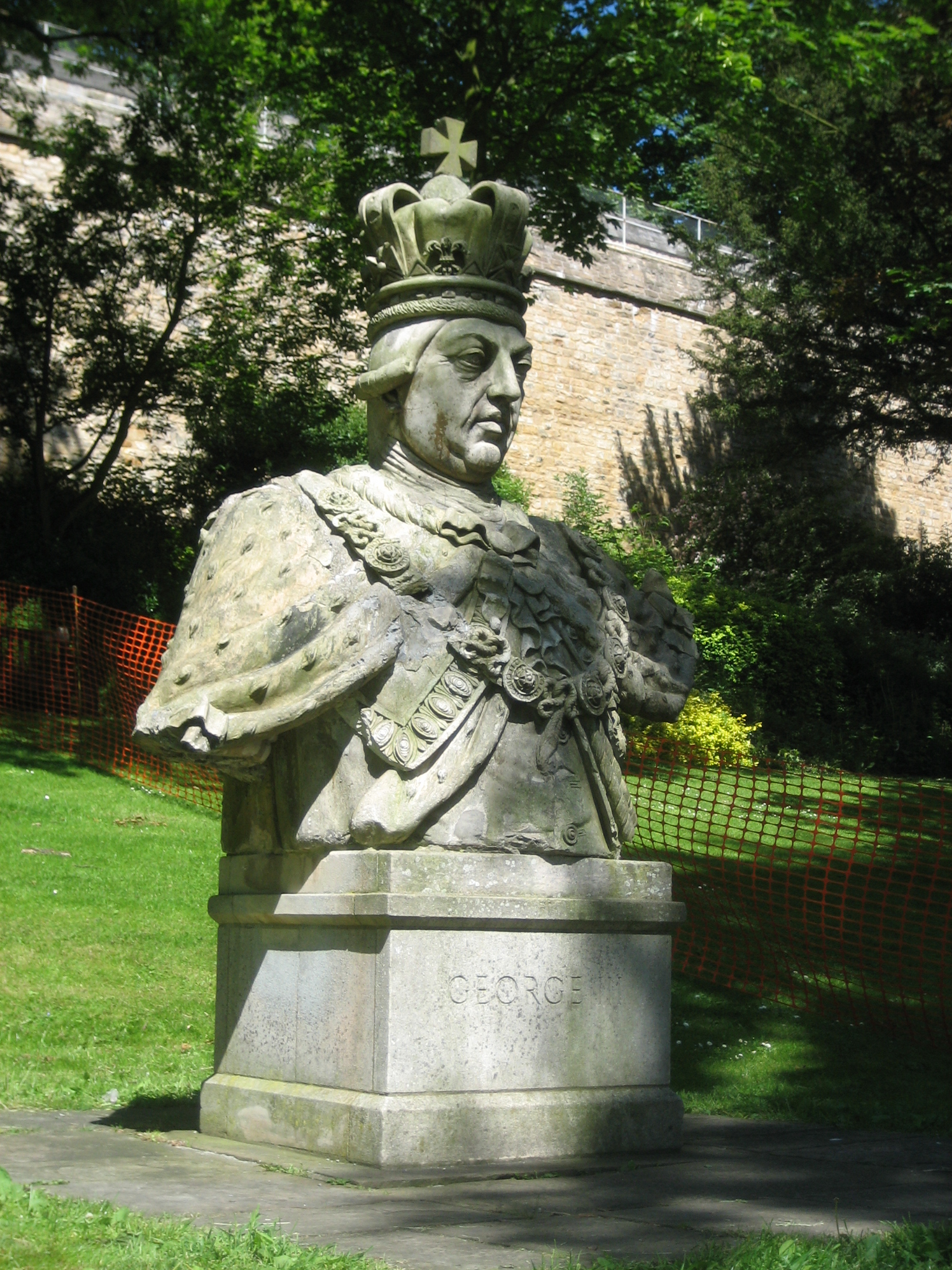
Coade stone bust of George III from the Dunston Pillar to the south of Lincoln

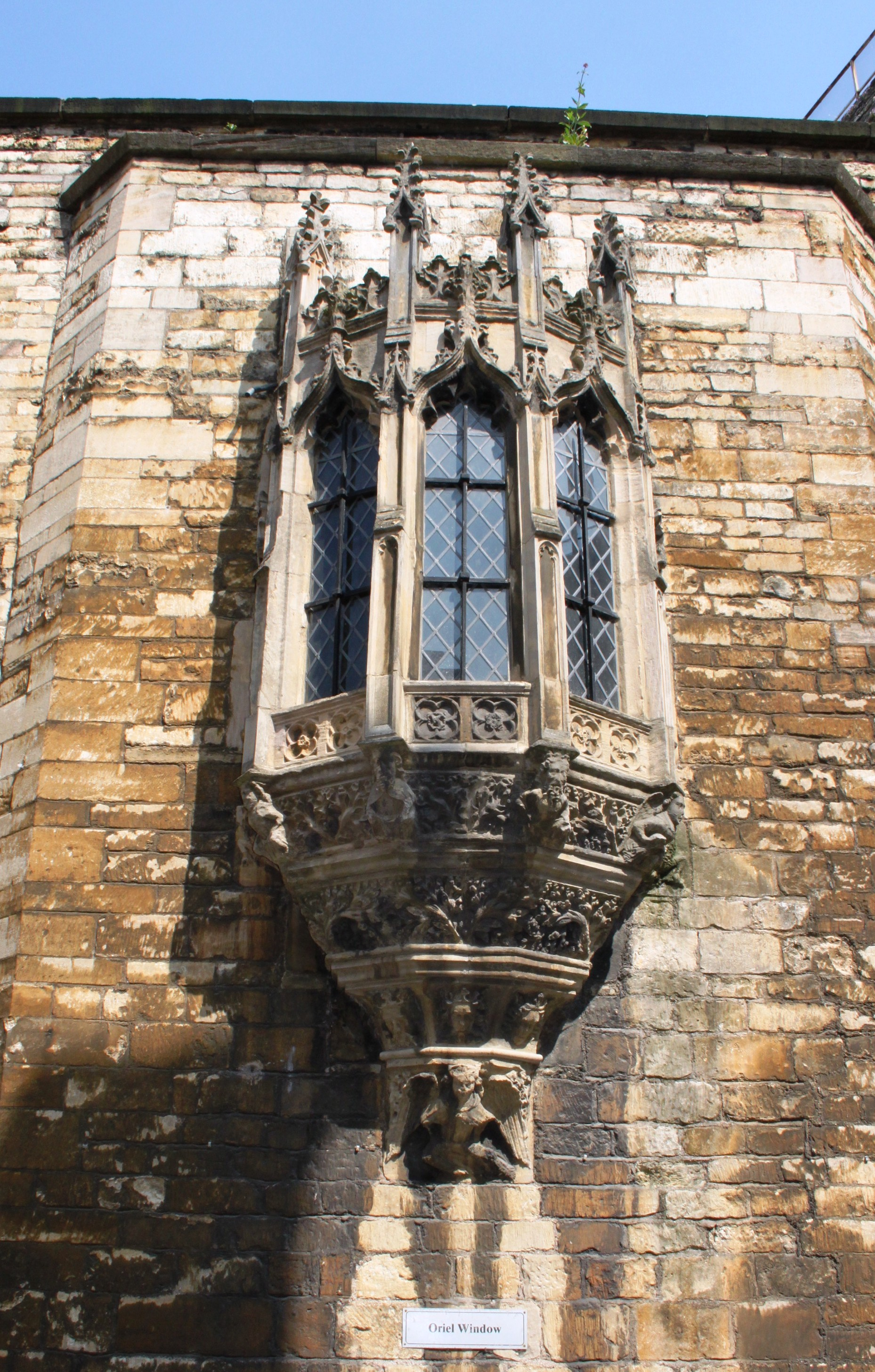
Oriel window in the gatehouse, moved from John of Gaunt’s Palace, Lincoln, in 1849

== See also ==
- Castles in Great Britain and Ireland
- List of castles in England
- John of Gaunt’s Palace, Lincoln
