= Hamon Sutton =

English politician

Hamon Sutton (ca. 1392 – 1461/1462), of Lincoln, was an English politician.

== Family ==
Sutton was the son of MP Robert Sutton of Lincoln. He married Margaret Vavasour, from Yorkshire, who was a member of the influential Skipwith family through her mother.

== Career ==
He was a Member (MP) of the Parliament of England for Lincoln in March 1416 and 1420, May 1421, 1422, 1423, 1425 and 1426, and for Lincolnshire in 1431, 1435 and 1439.

He was High Sheriff of Lincolnshire for 1429–30.
