= Vincent Grantham =

16th-century English politician

Vincent Grantham (by 1496 – 1550), of Goltho and Lincoln, was an English member of parliament.

He was born the eldest son of Edward Grantham of Lincoln and educated in the Law at Lincoln's Inn (1510).

He was elected Mayor of Lincoln for 1527–28 and 1541–42 and a member (MP) of the Parliament of England for Lincoln in 1529 and 1536.

He married three times and had 3 sons and 6 daughters. His eldest son was Thomas Grantham, also an MP and Mayor of Lincoln.
