= John Halton =

16th-century English politician

John Halton (by 1491 – 1527/1530) of Lincoln, England was an English member of parliament.

He was appointed sheriff of Lincoln for 1513–14 and Mayor of Lincoln for 1522–3. In 1517 he gained the rank of Alderman, an honour he kept until his death.

He was a member (MP) of the parliament of England for Lincoln in 1523.

He was married with 3 sons and 2 daughters.
