= William Dalderby =

English politician

William Dalderby (fl. 1383–1404) was an English politician. He was a Member (MP) of the Parliament of England for Lincoln from October 1383 and January 1404. William, the second son of Robert Dalderby, prospered in the wool trade. In September 1378, William became bailiff of Lincoln, and soon thereafter he received his first royal commission. During his year in office in 1383 as MP, his term was uneventful.

== Offices held ==
- Bailiff, Lincoln - September, 1378–1379
- Mayor of Lincoln - 1382–1383, 1384–1385
- Controller of a tax, Lincoln - December 1380
- Collector, Lincoln - November 1386
- Commissioner, Lincoln - November 1383
- Mayor of the Boston Staple, Lincolnshire - July 1389 – 1390
- Coroner of the liberty of Lincoln - August 1403 – 1406
