= Robert Messingham =

English politician

Robert Messingham (died 1396), of Lincoln, was an English politician.

He was elected Mayor of Lincoln for 1388–89 and a member (MP) of the parliament of England for Lincoln in 1394.
