= List of mayors of Lincoln, England =

Mayor of the City of Lincoln
- Coat of arms of Lincoln
- Incumbent; Cllr Clare Smalley (Lib) since May 2026
- Style: The Right Worshipful the Mayor of the City of Lincoln
- Member of: City of Lincoln Council
- Appointer: City of Lincoln Council
- Term length: 1 Year
- Inaugural holder: Adam son of Reginald 1206
- Formation: before the year 1206
- Succession: May 2027
- Deputy: Councillor Clare Smalley (Lib Dem)
- Salary: None

The Mayor of Lincoln is regarded as the first citizen of the city of Lincoln, England and has precedence in all places within the City, subject to the Royal prerogative.

The Mayor, during their term of Office, remains impartial and is unable to attend or become involved in any political matters. Their full title is "The Right Worshipful the Mayor of Lincoln". The position of Mayor of Lincoln was established in 1206.

The following have been mayors of Lincoln:

- 1379–80: Robert Sutton, MP for Lincoln 11 times between 1381 and 1399
- 1380–81: Gilbert Beesby, MP for Lincoln, 1382, 1388 and 1401
- 1382–83: William Dalderby, MP for Lincoln, 1383 and 1404
- 1383–84: Robert Saltby, MP for Lincoln, 1383 and 1386
- 1384–85: William Dalderby, MP for Lincoln, 1383 and 1404
- 1386–87: John Sutton, MP for Lincoln 5 times between 1369 and 1388
- 1387–88: Robert Ledes, MP for Lincoln, 1382, 1391 and 1395
- 1388–89: Robert Messingham, MP for Lincoln, 1394
- 1389–90: Seman Laxfield, MP for Lincoln, 1397 and 1404
- 1390–91: Thomas Thornhagh, MP for Lincoln, 1393
- 1393–94: Robert Harworth, MP for Lincoln, 1388, 1395 and 1401
- 1394–95: John Belasise, MP for Lincoln, 1393 and 1411
- 1399–1400: John Balderton, MP for Lincoln 1402
- 1401–02: William Blyton, MP for Lincoln, 1399 and 1402
- 1402–03: Robert Appleby, MP for Lincoln, 1397 and 1404
- 1405–06: Nicholas Huddleston, MP for Lincoln, 1404
- 1407–08: Thomas Forster, MP for Lincoln, 1406, 1413 and 1416
- 1411–12: Richard Bell, MP for Lincoln, 1407
- 1412–13: John Ryle, MP for Lincoln, 1414
- 1416–17: Thomas Archer, MP for Lincoln, 1415 and 1417
- 1420–21: Thomas Teryng, MP for Lincoln, 1414
- 1422–23: William Blyton, MP for Lincoln, 1399 and 1402
- 1501–02, 1511–12, 1524–25, 1535–36: Robert Alanson, MP for Lincoln, 1512 and 1515
- 1515: William Sammes, MP for Lincoln, 1529
- 1522: John Halton, MP for Lincoln, 1523
- 1527–28, 1541-42: Vincent Grantham, MP for Lincoln, 1529 and 1536
- 1539–40, 1549-50: William Yates, MP of Lincoln, 1545
- 1542–43: William Alanson, MP for Lincoln, 1542
- 1554–55: William Rotheram, MP for Lincoln, 1554
- 1557–58: Thomas Grantham, MP for Lincoln, 1547
- 1562–63, 1572–73, 1581-82: William Kent
- 1639: William Bishop
- 1650–1651 Original Peart, MP for Lincoln 1654 and 1656.
- 1669: Thomas Bishop, JP and mercer
- 1867–69 John Richard Battle, Pharmaceutical chemist, druggist & farmer, 1890
- 1869–70 Joseph Ruston, agricultural engineer, MP for Lincoln, 1884
- 1878–79, 1879–80, 1883–84, 1884-85: Francis J. Clarke, chemist and creator of Clarke's Blood Mixture
- 1902–03: Charles Pratt (Liberal Unionist)

== 21st century ==
Source: Its About Lincoln

- 2001–02: Patricia A McGinley
- 2002–03: Gary T Hewson
- 2003–04: Donald J Nannestad
- 2004–05: Edmund W Strengiel
- 2005–06: Adelle Ellis
- 2006–07: Stephen A Allnutt
- 2007–08: Hilton Spratt
- 2008–09: Ronald Hills
- 2009–10: David F Gratrick
- 2010–11: Geoffrey Kirby
- 2011–12: Kathleen E Brothwell
- 2012–13: Karen Lee
- 2013–14: Patrick J Vaughan
- 2014–15: Brent Charlesworth
- 2015–16: Andrew Kerry
- 2016–17: Yvonne Bodger
- 2017–18: Chris Burke(811th Mayor of Lincoln)
- 2018–19: Keith Weaver (812th Mayor of Lincoln)
- 2019–21 Sue Burke (813th Mayor of Lincoln)

(Appointment extended until May 2021 due to the Coronavirus Pandemic

- 2021–22 Jackie Kirk
- 2022–23 Rosanne Kirk
- 2023–24 Biff Bean
- 2024–25 Alan Briggs
- 2025 - 26 Bill Mara
- 2026 - Clare Smalley
