= Robert Sutton (died 1414) =

Member of the Parliament of England

Parliament of England

Personal details
- Died: 1414
- Occupation: politician

Robert Sutton (died 1414), of Lincoln, Lincolnshire, was an English merchant, Member of Parliament and mayor.

== Family ==
His brother, John Sutton, was also an MP for Lincoln, as was his son, Hamon Sutton.

== Career ==
Sutton was one of the wealthiest and most influential merchants in Lincoln and was elected Mayor of Lincoln and Mayor of the Boston Staple for 1379–80.

He was a Member (MP) of the Parliament of England for Lincoln in 1381, May 1382, October 1383, November 1384, 1385, 1386, February 1388, 1391, 1394, January 1397 and 1399.
