= William Alanson =

16th-century English politician

William Alanson (by 1519 – 1554/55 or later), of Lincoln, was an English member of parliament.

He was appointed Sheriff of Lincoln for 1540–41 and elected Mayor of Lincoln for 1542–43. He gained the rank of Alderman in 1542 which he kept until his death.

He was a member (MP) of the parliament of England for Lincoln in 1542.
