= Thomas Grantham (died 1558) =

English politician

Thomas Grantham (by 1525 – 15 October 1558) was an English politician.

He was the only son of Vincent Grantham of Goltho and Lincoln and trained for the law in Lincoln's Inn.

He was elected a member (MP) of the parliament of England for Lincoln in 1547. He was a justice of the peace (JP) for Lincolnshire (Kesteven and Lindsey) from 1554 to his death. He was an alderman for Lincoln from 1557, serving as Mayor of Lincoln for 1557–8.

He married Mary, the daughter and coheiress of Sir John Dunham of Kirklington, Nottinghamshire, with whom he had 3 sons and 4 daughters.
