= Robert Ledes =

English politician

Robert Ledes of Lincoln was an English politician.

He was elected Mayor of Lincoln for 1387–88 and Mayor of the Boston Staple for 1390–91.

He was a member (MP) of the parliament of England for Lincoln in 1382, 1391 and 1395.
