= Edward Ayscough =

Edward Ayscough may refer to:

- Edward Ayscu (1550–?), or Ayscough (1550–1616), English historian
- Edward Ayscough (of Nuthall) (c. 1590–after 1641), MP for Stamford 1624
- Sir Edward Ayscough (born 1596) (1596–by 1654), English MP for Lincoln and Lincolnshire
- Sir Edward Ayscough (died 1668) (c. 1618–1668), English MP for Great Grimsby 1659
- Sir Edward Ayscough (died 1699) (1650–1699), English MP for Great Grimsby 1685–1699
