= Thomas Grantham (died 1630) =

English politician

Sir Thomas Grantham (1573 – 30 July 1630) was an English politician who sat in the House of Commons from 1604 to 1629.

Grantham was the son of Vincent Grantham of Goltho and St Katherines, Lincolnshire. He matriculated at Christ Church, Oxford on 9 May 1589, aged 16, and was a student of Lincoln's Inn in 1592 .

He was High Sheriff of Lincolnshire in 1600 and was knighted at Belvoir Castle on 23 April 1603.

In 1604 and 1614, Grantham was elected Member of Parliament for Lincoln and for Lincolnshire in 1621 and 1624. He was elected MP for Lincoln again in 1625, 1626 and 1628 when he sat until 1629, after which time King Charles I decided to rule without parliament for eleven years.

Grantham lived at Goltho, Lincolnshire where he died in 1630.

Grantham firstly married Frances Puckering, the daughter of John Puckering; they had four sons and three daughters. He secondly married widow Lucy Sacheverall of Ratcliffe on Soar, Nottingham, daughter of William Boughton, with whom he had a further daughter, Ann. One son Thomas Grantham became MP for Grantham. Ann married into the Marrow dynasty of Berkswell, Warwick and her son was Samuel Marrow whose descendants were governors of Australia.

Parliament of England
Preceded by George Anton; Francis Bullingham	Member of Parliament for Lincoln; 1604–1614; With: Sir Edward Tyrwhitt 1604; Edward Bash 1614	Succeeded by Sir Lewis Watson, Bt; Sir Edward Ayscough
Preceded by Sir George Manners; Sir Peregrine Bertie	Member of Parliament for Lincolnshire; 1621–1624; With: Sir George Manners 1621; Montagu Bertie 1624	Succeeded by Sir John Wray, Bt; Sir Nicholas Saunderson, Bt
Preceded by Sir Lewis Watson, Bt; Thomas Hatcher	Member of Parliament for Lincoln; 1625–1619; With: Sir John Monson1625; Robert Monson 1626; Sir Edward Ayscough 1628–1629	Parliament suspended until 1640
