= Lincoln (constituency) =

Parliamentary constituency in the United Kingdom, 1885 onwards

Coordinates: 53.23°N 0.54°W

- Borough constituency for the House of Commons
- Interactive map of boundaries since 2010
- Location within the East Midlands
- County: Lincolnshire
- Electorate: 74,128 (March 2020)
- Major settlements: Lincoln, Bracebridge Heath, Waddington and Skellingthorpe

Current constituency
- Created: 1265
- Member of Parliament: Hamish Falconer (Lab)
- Seats: Two until 1885, then one

Lincoln is a constituency in Lincolnshire, England represented in the House of Commons of the UK Parliament since 2024 by Hamish Falconer of the Labour Party.

Since the split of the City of York seat with effect from the 2010 general election, Lincoln has been the oldest constituency in continuous existence in the UK – established in 1265. Lincoln was a bellwether between October 1974 and 2017. The seat bucked the national Conservative victory in 1970 by electing a Labour MP, as it did in 2017. In 2019 and 2024, Lincoln followed the national result, electing a Conservative MP in 2019 and a Labour MP in 2024.

The seat has been considered, relative to others, an ultra-marginal seat, as well as a swing seat. From 2005 until 2024, its winner's majority had not exceeded 6.9% of the vote since the 12.5% majority won in 2005 and the seat had changed hands three times since then. However, in 2024, Hamish Falconer secured the seat with a majority of 20.8%.

== Constituency profile ==
Lincoln is a constituency in Lincolnshire, covering the city of Lincoln and the nearby villages of Bracebridge Heath, Waddington and Skellingthorpe. Lincoln is a historic cathedral city that dates back to at least the Roman era when it was known as Lindum Colonia, from which the modern name originates. The city is known for its cathedral, once the tallest building in the world, and its university which has around 20,000 students. The city has average levels of wealth; there are high levels of deprivation in the St Giles and Ermine estates which have a high quantity of council housing, whilst the west of the city and the outlying villages are more affluent. House prices in Lincoln are lower than the national and East Midlands averages.

In general, residents of Lincoln are young and have average levels of education. Household income and homeownership rates are low, and a high proportion of residents work in the health sector. The city's rate of child poverty is higher than the national figure. The city is politically mixed at the local council level; the west of the city is represented by Labour Party councillors, the east by Liberal Democrats, the south around Bracebridge by Reform UK and the outlying villages mostly by Conservatives. An estimated 58% of voters in Lincoln supported leaving the European Union in the 2016 referendum, higher than the nationwide figure of 52%.

== Boundaries ==
=== Historic ===
1885–1918: The existing parliamentary borough, and the parish of Bracebridge.

1918–1950: The County Borough of Lincoln, and the Urban District of Bracebridge.

1950–1974: The County Borough of Lincoln.

1974–1983: As prior but with redrawn boundaries.

1983–1997: The City of Lincoln, and the District of North Kesteven wards of Bracebridge Heath, North Hykeham Central, North Hykeham North, North Hykeham South, Skellingthorpe, and Waddington West.

1997–2010: The City of Lincoln, and the District of North Kesteven ward of Bracebridge Heath.

2010–2023: The City of Lincoln, and the District of North Kesteven wards of Bracebridge Heath and Waddington East, and Skellingthorpe.

=== Current ===
Following a local government boundary review in the District of North Kesteven which came into effect in May 2023, the constituency now comprises the following:

- The City Of Lincoln.
- In the District of Kesteven: the Bracebridge Heath ward; the majority of the Skellingthorpe & Eagle ward; and the majority of the Waddington Rural ward.

The 2023 review of Westminster constituencies, which was based on the ward structure in place at 1 December 2020, left the boundaries unchanged.

The constituency, as its name suggests, covers the cathedral city (Note: Lincoln Cathedral was from 1311 until an intense storm in 1549 the world's tallest building) of Lincoln in Lincolnshire, and most of its directly adjoining villages.

== History ==
Lincoln first sent Members to Parliament in 1265, thirty years before the first all-over coverage of cities and qualifying towns was introduced in the Model Parliament, and has done so ever since, although no records exist from before the end of the 13th century. The early elections were held at the Guildhall and the burgesses elected were usually officials of the borough.

The representation, originally two Members ("burgesses"), was reduced to one Member in 1885.

The seat was represented for five years by former Cabinet minister Margaret Jackson, later Margaret Beckett. (Note: Changed seat in 1983 to serve Derby South which she has held to date (winning most recently in 2019)) Lincoln became the oldest constituency in the country in 2010 when the City of York constituency was divided.

== Members of Parliament ==
Year	Member	Party
1307 (January)	Hugh Skarlet	Independent
1307 (June)	Henry de Windsor	Independent
1369	John Sutton	Independent
1372	John Sutton	Independent
1373	John Sutton	Independent
1381	Robert Sutton	Independent
1377 (July)	John Sutton	Independent
1377 (October)	John Sutton	Independent
1382 (May)	Robert Sutton	Independent
1382 (December)	Robert Sutton	Independent
1383	Robert Saltby	Independent
1384 (August)	Robert Saltby	Independent
1384 (November)	Robert Sutton	Independent
1385	Robert Sutton	Independent
1386	Robert Sutton	Independent
1388 (February)	John Sutton	Independent
1388 (September)	Gilbert Beesby	Independent
1388 (September)	Robert Harworth	Independent
1390 (January)	Nicholas Werk	Independent
1390 (November)	Robert Peck	Independent
1391	Robert Sutton	Independent
1391	Robert Ledes	Independent
1393	Thomas Thornhagh	Independent
1393	John Belasise	Independent
1394	Robert Sutton	Independent
1394	Robert Messingham	Independent
1395	Robert Harworth	Independent
1395	Robert Ledes	Independent
1397 (January)	Robert Sutton	Independent
1397 (January)	Robert Appleby	Independent
1397 (September)	Seman Laxfield	Independent
1397 (September)	John Thorley	Independent
1399	Robert Sutton	Independent
1399	William Blyton	Independent
1401	Robert Harworth	Independent
1401	Gilbert Beesby	Independent
1402	John Balderton	Independent
1402	William Blyton	Independent
1404 (January)	Seman Laxfield	Independent
1404 (January)	William Dalderby	Independent
1404 (October)	Nicholas Huddleston	Independent
1404 (October)	Robert Appleby	Independent
1406	Thomas Forster	Independent
1407	Richard Worsop	Independent
1410	Richard Bell	Independent
1411	John Bigge	Independent
1413 (February)	John Belasise	Independent
1413 (May)	John Dalderby	Independent
1414 (April)	Thomas Forster	Independent
1414 (November)	John Ryle	Independent
1414 (November)	Thomas Teryng	Independent
1415	Thomas Archer	Independent
1415	Thomas Forster	Independent
1416 (March)	John Bigge	Independent
1416 (October)	Hamon Sutton	Independent
1417	Thomas Archer	Independent
1419	Robert Walsh	Independent
1420	John Bigge	Independent
1421 (May)	Hamon Sutton	Independent
1421 (December)	William Leadenham	Independent
1423	Robert Walsh	Independent
1425	Hamon Sutton	Independent
1426	Hamon Sutton	Independent
1459	Thomas Fitzwilliam	Independent
1510	Robert Alanson	Independent
1512	Richard Clerke	Independent
1515	John Halton	Independent
1523	Richard Clerke	Independent
1529	William Sammes	Independent
1536	Vincent Grantham	Independent
1536	Thomas Moigne	Independent
1539	Robert Dighton	Independent
1539	Anthony Missenden	Independent
1542	Anthony Missenden	Independent
1542	William Alanson	Independent
1543	William Yates	Independent
1543	George St Poll	Independent
1545	George St Poll	Independent
1547	Thomas Grantham	Independent
1547	Robert Farrar	Independent
1553 (March)	Robert Farrar	Independent
1553 (October)	Robert Farrar	Independent
1553 (October)	George St Poll	Independent
1554 (April)	George St Poll	Independent
1554 (April)	William Rotheram	Independent
1554 (November)	George St Poll	Independent
1554 (November)	Robert Farrar	Independent
1555	Robert Farrar	Independent
1558	George St Poll	Independent
1558	Francis Kempe	Independent
1559	Anthony Thorold	Independent
1562	Robert Monson	Independent
1563	Robert Monson	Independent
1571	Thomas Wilson	Independent
1572 (February)	Thomas Wilson	Independent
1572 (May)	John Welcome	Independent
1584	Stephen Thymbleby	Independent
1584	John Joye	Independent
1586	John Savile	Independent
1586	Thomas Fairfax	Independent
1588	George Anton	Independent
1589	Peter Eure	Independent
1593	Charles Dymoke	Independent
1597	Thomas Grantham	Independent
1597	George Anton	Independent
1601 (August)	George Anton	Independent
1601 (October)	George Anton	Independent
1601 (October)	Francis Bullingham	Independent
1604	Sir Thomas Grantham	Independent
1604	Sir Edward Tyrwhitt	Independent
1614	Edward Bash	Independent
1621	Sir Lewis Watson, (1st Baronet)	Independent
1621	Sir Edward Ayscough	Independent
1624	Thomas Hatcher	Independent
1625	Sir Thomas Grantham	Independent
1625	Sir John Monson	Independent
1626	Robert Monson	Independent
1628	Sir Edward Ayscough	Independent
1629	Sir Edward Ayscough	Independent
1640 (April)	Thomas Grantham	Independent
1640 (April)	John Farmery	Independent
1640 (November)	John Broxholme	Independent
1640 (November)	Thomas Lister	Independent
1654	William Marshall	Independent
1654	Original Peart	Independent
1656	Humphrey Walcot	Independent
1659	Robert Marshal	Independent
1659	Thomas Meres	Independent
1660	John Monson	Independent
1660	Sir Thomas Meres	Independent
1661	Sir Robert Bolles, Bt	Independent
1664	Sir John Monson	Independent
1675	Henry Monson	Independent
1679 (March)	Henry Monson	Independent
1679 (October)	Henry Monson	Independent
1681	Sir Thomas Hussey, Bt	Independent
1685	Henry Monson	Independent
1689 (January)	Henry Monson	Independent
1689 (May)	Sir Christopher Nevile	Independent
1689 (May)	Sir Edward Hussey, Bt	Independent
1690	Sir John Bolles, Bt.	Independent
1695	William Monson	Independent
1698	Sir Edward Hussey, Bt	Independent
1701 (January)	Sir Thomas Meres	Independent
1701 (December)	Sir Edward Hussey, Bt	Independent
1702	Sir Thomas Meres	Independent
1705	Sir Thomas Meres	Independent
1708	Sir Thomas Meres	Independent
1710	Richard Grantham	Independent
1713	John Sibthorpe	Independent
1713	Thomas Lister	Independent
1715	Richard Grantham	Independent
1715	Sir John Tyrwhitt, Bt	Whig
1722	Sir John Monson	Independent
1727	Charles Hall	Tory
1728	Sir John Tyrwhitt, 5th Bt	Whig
1734	Coningsby Sibthorp	Tory
1741	Charles Monson	Independent
1741	Sir John Tyrwhitt, 6th Bt	Independent
1747	Coningsby Sibthorp	Tory
1754	George Monson	Independent
1754	John Chaplin	Independent
1761	Coningsby Sibthorp	Tory
1768	Thomas Scrope	Independent
1768	Constantine Phipps (Note: Constantine Phipps later succeeded to the peerage as the 2nd Baron Mulgrave.)	Independent
1774	George Lumley	Independent
1780	Sir Thomas Clarges, Bt	Independent
1783	Robert Vyner	Independent
1784	John Fenton-Cawthorne (Note: John Fenton-Cawthorne was expelled from the House of Commons on 2 May 1796.)	Independent
1790	Richard Lumley-Savile	Independent
1796 (May)	Robert Hobart (Note: Robert Hobart was known as Robert Hobart until 1793, and as Lord Hobart from 1793 until he acceded to the peerage in 1804 as the 4th Earl of Buckinghamshire.)	Independent
1796 (July)	George Rawdon	Independent
1802	Humphrey Sibthorp	Tory
1802	Richard Ellison	Tory
1806	William Monson	Independent
1807	John Savile	Independent
1812	Sir Henry Sullivan	Independent
1814	John Nicholas Fazakerley	Independent
1814	Coningsby Waldo-Sibthorp	Tory
1818	Ralph Bernal	Whig
1820	Robert Percy Smith	Whig
1822	John Williams	Independent
1826	John Nicholas Fazakerley	Whig
1830	John Fardell	Tory
1830	Charles Sibthorp	Tory
1831	George Heneage	Whig
1832	Edward Bulwer-Lytton (Note: Edward Bulwer was known as Bulwer-Lytton from 1844, and in 1866 became the 1st Baron Lytton.)	Whig
1835	Charles Sibthorp	Conservative
1841	William Rickford Collett	Conservative
1847	Charles Seely	Radical
1848 by-election	Thomas Hobhouse	Radical
1852	George Heneage	Whig
1857	George Heneage	Whig
1856 by-election	Gervaise Sibthorp	Conservative
1859	Gervaise Sibthorp	Conservative
1861 by-election	Charles Seely	Liberal
1862 by-election	John Bramley-Moore	Conservative
1865	Edward Heneage	Liberal
1868	John Hinde Palmer	Liberal
1874	Edward Chaplin	Conservative
1880	John Hinde Palmer	Liberal
1884 by-election	Joseph Ruston	Liberal
1885	Joseph Ruston	Liberal
1886 by-election	Joseph Ruston	Liberal Unionist
1886	Frederick Kerans	Conservative
1892	William Crosfield	Liberal
1895	Charles Seely	Liberal Unionist
1906	Charles Roberts	Liberal
1906	Charles Roberts	Liberal
1910 (January)	Charles Roberts	Liberal
1910 (December)	Charles Roberts	Liberal
1918	Alfred Davies	Coalition Conservative
1922	Alfred Davies	Coalition Conservative
1924	Robert Arthur Taylor	Labour
1929	Walter Liddall	Conservative
1931	Walter Liddall	Conservative
1935	Walter Liddall	Conservative
1945	George Deer	Labour
1950	Geoffrey de Freitas	Labour
1951	Geoffrey de Freitas	Labour
1955	Geoffrey de Freitas	Labour
1959	Geoffrey de Freitas	Labour
1962 by-election	Dick Taverne	Labour
1964	Dick Taverne	Labour
1966	Dick Taverne	Labour
1970	Dick Taverne	Labour
1973 by-election	Dick Taverne	Democratic Labour
February 1974	Dick Taverne	Democratic Labour
October 1974	Margaret Jackson	Labour
1979	Kenneth Carlisle	Conservative
1983	Kenneth Carlisle	Conservative
1987	Kenneth Carlisle	Conservative
1992	Kenneth Carlisle	Conservative
1997	Gillian Merron	Labour
2001	Gillian Merron	Labour
2005	Gillian Merron	Labour
2010	Karl McCartney	Conservative
2015	Karl McCartney	Conservative
2017	Karen Lee	Labour
2019	Karl McCartney	Conservative
2024	Hamish Falconer	Labour

== Elections ==
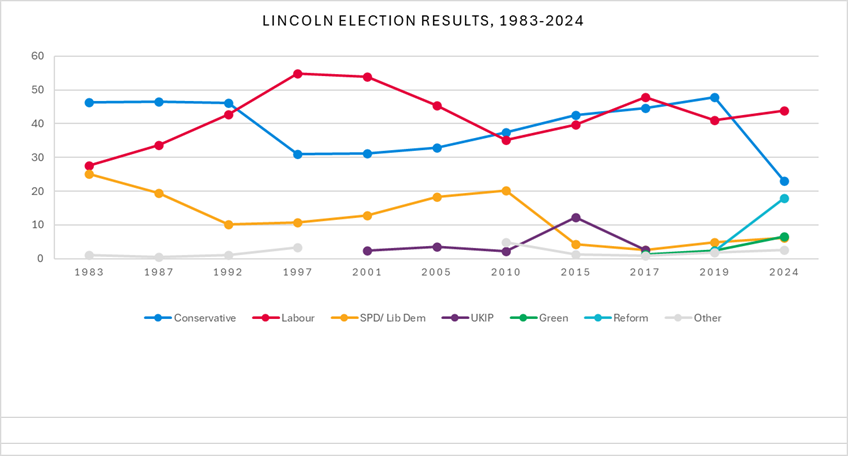
Lincoln election results 1983-2024

=== Elections in the 2020s ===
General election 2024: Lincoln
Party	Candidate	Votes	%	±%
Labour	Hamish Falconer	18,470	43.8	+2.8
Conservative	Karl McCartney	9,677	23.0	−24.9
Reform	Jamie-Lee McMillan	7,602	18.0	+15.9
Green	Sally Horscroft	2,751	6.5	+4.1
Liberal Democrats	Clare Smalley	2,580	6.1	+1.3
Workers Party	Linda Richardson	479	1.1	N/A
Liberal	Charles Shaw	278	0.7	+0.1
Independent	Laura Victoria Ashby	243	0.6	N/A
SDP	Craig Marshall	80	0.2	N/A
Majority		8,793	20.8	N/A
Turnout		42,160	58.3	−10.0
Registered electors		72,313		
Labour gain from Conservative		Swing	+13.8	

=== Elections in the 2010s ===
General election 2019: Lincoln
Party	Candidate	Votes	%	±%
Conservative	Karl McCartney	24,267	47.9	▲3.2
Labour	Karen Lee	20,753	41.0	▼6.9
Liberal Democrats	Caroline Kenyon	2,422	4.8	▲2.2
Green	Sally Horscroft	1,195	2.4	▲1.2
Brexit Party	Reece Wilkes	1,079	2.1	New
Independent	Rob Bradley	609	1.2	▲1.2
Liberal	Charles Shaw	304	0.6	▲0.6
Majority		3,514	6.9	N/A
Turnout		50,629	67.7	▲1.1
Conservative gain from Labour		Swing	▲5.1	

General election 2017: Lincoln
Party	Candidate	Votes	%	±%
Labour	Karen Lee	23,333	47.9	▲8.3
Conservative	Karl McCartney	21,795	44.7	▲2.1
UKIP	Nick Smith	1,287	2.6	▼9.6
Liberal Democrats	Caroline Kenyon	1,284	2.6	▼1.7
Green	Ben Loryman	583	1.2	New
Independent	Phil Gray	312	0.6	New
Independent	Iain Scott-Burdon	124	0.3	New
Majority		1,538	3.2	N/A
Turnout		48,718	66.6	▲3.4
Labour gain from Conservative		Swing	▲3.1	

General election 2015: Lincoln
Party	Candidate	Votes	%	±%
Conservative	Karl McCartney	19,976	42.6	+5.1
Labour	Lucy Rigby	18,533	39.6	+4.4
UKIP	Nick Smith	5,721	12.2	+10.0
Liberal Democrats	Ross Pepper	1,992	4.3	−15.9
TUSC	Elaine Smith	344	0.7	New
Lincolnshire Independent	Helen Powell	286	0.6	New
Majority		1,443	3.0	+0.7
Turnout		46,852	63.2	+1.0
Conservative hold		Swing	+0.38	

General election 2010: Lincoln
Party	Candidate	Votes	%	±%
Conservative	Karl McCartney	17,163	37.5	+4.6
Labour	Gillian Merron	16,105	35.2	−10.2
Liberal Democrats	Reg Shore	9,256	20.2	+2.0
BNP	Robert West	1,367	3.0	New
UKIP	Nick Smith	1,004	2.2	−1.3
English Democrat	Ernest Coleman	604	1.3	New
Independent	Gary Walker	222	0.5	New
Majority		1,058	2.3	N/A
Turnout		45,721	62.2	+4.9
Conservative gain from Labour		Swing	+6.75	

=== Elections in the 2000s ===
General election 2005: Lincoln
Party	Candidate	Votes	%	±%
Labour	Gillian Merron	16,724	45.4	−8.5
Conservative	Karl McCartney	12,110	32.9	+1.7
Liberal Democrats	Lisa Gabriel	6,715	18.2	+5.5
UKIP	Nick Smith	1,308	3.5	+1.2
Majority		4,613	12.5	−10.2
Turnout		36,856	56.5	+0.5
Labour hold		Swing	-5.1	

General election 2001: Lincoln
Party	Candidate	Votes	%	±%
Labour	Gillian Merron	20,003	53.9	−1.0
Conservative	Christine-Anne Talbot	11,583	31.2	+0.2
Liberal Democrats	Lisa Gabriel	4,703	12.7	+1.9
UKIP	Rodger Doughty	836	2.3	New
Majority		8,420	22.7	−1.2
Turnout		37,125	56.0	−15.1
Labour hold		Swing		

=== Elections in the 1990s ===
General election 1997: Lincoln
Party	Candidate	Votes	%	±%
Labour	Gillian Merron	25,563	54.9	+12.1
Conservative	Tony Brown	14,433	31.0	−16.1
Liberal Democrats	Lisa Gabriel	5,048	10.8	+0.7
Referendum	John Ivory	1,329	2.9	New
Natural Law	Adrian Myers	175	0.4	New
Majority		11,130	23.9	N/A
Turnout		46,548	71.1	−8.0
Labour gain from Conservative		Swing	+14.1	

General election 1992: Lincoln
Party	Candidate	Votes	%	±%
Conservative	Kenneth Carlisle	28,792	46.1	−0.4
Labour	Nick Butler	26,743	42.8	+9.1
Liberal Democrats	David Harding-Price	6,316	10.1	−9.3
Liberal	Sue Wiggin	603	1.0	+1.0
Majority		2,049	3.3	−9.5
Turnout		62,454	79.1	+3.5
Conservative hold		Swing	−4.8	

=== Elections in the 1980s ===
General election 1987: Lincoln
Party	Candidate	Votes	%	±%
Conservative	Kenneth Carlisle	27,097	46.5	+0.1
Labour	Nick Butler	19,614	33.7	+6.2
SDP	Peter Zentner	11,319	19.4	−5.7
Unknown	Thomas Kyle	232	0.4	New
Majority		7,483	12.8	−6.1
Turnout		58,262	75.6	+1.0
Conservative hold		Swing		

General election 1983: Lincoln
Party	Candidate	Votes	%	±%
Conservative	Kenneth Carlisle	25,244	46.4	
Labour	Malcolm Withers	14,958	27.5	
SDP	Freddie Stockdale	13,631	25.1	
Independent	Gilbert Blades	523	1.0	New
Majority		10,286	18.9	
Turnout		54,356	74.6	
Conservative hold		Swing		

=== Elections in the 1970s ===
General election 1979: Lincoln
Party	Candidate	Votes	%	±%
Conservative	Kenneth Carlisle	17,777	41.4	+13.1
Labour	Margaret Jackson	17,175	40.0	+2.9
Liberal	Keith Melton	5,638	13.1	New
Democratic Labour	Freddie Stockdale	1,743	4.1	−30.5
National Front	J. Noble	523	1.2	New
Revolutionary Reform	T. Kyle	77	0.2	New
Majority		602	1.4	N/A
Turnout		42,933	77.0	+2.2
Conservative gain from Labour		Swing	+5.1	

General election October 1974: Lincoln
Party	Candidate	Votes	%	±%
Labour	Margaret Jackson	14,698	37.1	+4.6
Democratic Labour	Dick Taverne	13,714	34.6	−1.0
Conservative	Peter Myles Moran	11,223	28.3	−3.7
Majority		984	2.5	N/A
Turnout		39,635	74.8	−4.3
Labour gain from Democratic Labour		Swing		

General election February 1974: Lincoln
Party	Candidate	Votes	%	±%
Democratic Labour	Dick Taverne	14,780	35.6	
Labour	Margaret Jackson	13,487	32.5	
Conservative	Peter Myles Moran	13,299	32.0	
Majority		1,293	3.1	
Turnout		41,566	79.1	
Democratic Labour hold		Swing		

1973 Lincoln by-election
Party	Candidate	Votes	%	±%
Democratic Labour	Dick Taverne	21,967	58.2	+58.2
Labour	John Dilks	8,776	23.2	−27.8
Conservative	Jonathan Guinness	6,616	17.5	−21.5
Democratic Conservative	Reginald Simmerson	198	0.5	New
Majority Rule	Malcolm Waller	100	0.3	New
Independent	Jean Justice	81	0.2	New
Majority		13,191	35.0	N/A
Turnout		37,738	72.6	−1.8
Democratic Labour gain from Labour		Swing		

General election 1970: Lincoln
Party	Candidate	Votes	%	±%
Labour	Dick Taverne	20,090	51.0	−7.3
Conservative	Richard Alexander	15,340	39.0	−2.7
Independent Liberal	Gilbert Blades	3,937	10.0	New
Majority		4,750	12.0	−4.6
Turnout		39,367	74.4	−4.3
Labour hold		Swing		

=== Elections in the 1960s ===
General election 1966: Lincoln
Party	Candidate	Votes	%	±%
Labour	Dick Taverne	23,006	58.3	+10.5
Conservative	Richard Alexander	16,469	41.7	+5.3
Majority		6,537	16.6	+5.2
Turnout		39,475	78.7	−1.6
Labour hold		Swing		

General election 1964: Lincoln
Party	Candidate	Votes	%	±%
Labour	Dick Taverne	19,737	47.8	−7.3
Conservative	Michael McNair-Wilson	15,015	36.4	−8.5
Liberal	Patrick Furnell	6,519	15.8	N/A
Majority		4,722	11.4	+1.2
Turnout		41,271	80.3	−3.8
Labour hold		Swing		

1962 Lincoln by-election: Lincoln
Party	Candidate	Votes	%	±%
Labour	Dick Taverne	19,038	50.51	−4.59
Conservative	Percy Grieve	11,386	30.21	−14.69
Liberal	Patrick Furnell	6,856	18.19	New
Independent	A. Taylor	412	1.09	New
Majority		7,652	20.30	+10.10
Turnout		37,692		
Labour hold		Swing		

=== Elections in the 1950s ===
General election 1959: Lincoln
Party	Candidate	Votes	%	±%
Labour	Geoffrey de Freitas	23,629	55.1	−1.1
Conservative	Leslie Herbert Priestley	19,240	44.9	+1.1
Majority		4,389	10.2	−2.2
Turnout		42,869	84.1	−1.8
Labour hold		Swing		

General election 1955: Lincoln
Party	Candidate	Votes	%	±%
Labour	Geoffrey de Freitas	23,773	56.2	+2.1
Conservative	Peter Emery	18,551	43.8	−2.1
Majority		5,222	12.4	+4.2
Turnout		42,324	85.9	−1.9
Labour hold		Swing		

General election 1951: Lincoln
Party	Candidate	Votes	%	±%
Labour	Geoffrey de Freitas	23,400	54.1	+4.1
Conservative	Maurice Macmillan	19,840	45.9	+4.6
Majority		3,560	8.2	−0.5
Turnout		43,240	87.8	−0.9
Labour hold		Swing		

General election 1950: Lincoln
Party	Candidate	Votes	%	±%
Labour	Geoffrey de Freitas	21,537	50.0	
National Liberal	Francis Hill	17,784	41.3	
Liberal	Jean Henderson	3,753	8.7	
Majority		3,753	8.7	
Turnout		43,074	88.7	
Labour hold		Swing		

=== Election in the 1940s ===
General election 1945: Lincoln
Party	Candidate	Votes	%	±%
Labour	George Deer	14,052	41.3	−4.7
Conservative	Walter Liddall	10,414	30.5	−23.5
Liberal	Frederick Charles Truman	9,625	28.2	New
Majority		3,638	10.8	N/A
Turnout		34,091	80.3	−3.7
Labour gain from Conservative		Swing	+9.4	

General Election 1939/40

Another General Election was required to take place before the end of 1940. The political parties had been making preparations for an election to take place from 1939 and by the end of this year, the following candidates had been selected;

- Conservative: Walter Liddall
- Labour: George Deer
- Liberal:
- British Union: E. H. Adams

=== Elections in the 1930s ===
General election 1935: Lincoln
Party	Candidate	Votes	%	±%
Conservative	Walter Liddall	17,948	54.0	−4.9
Labour	George Deer	15,264	46.0	+4.9
Majority		2,684	8.0	−9.8
Turnout		33,212	84.0	−4.9
Conservative hold		Swing	−4.9	

General election 1931: Lincoln
Party	Candidate	Votes	%	±%
Conservative	Walter Liddall	20,688	58.9	+24.6
Labour	Robert Taylor	14,455	41.1	−2.5
Majority		6,233	17.8	N/A
Turnout		35,123	88.9	+0.4
Conservative gain from Labour		Swing	+13.5	

=== Elections in the 1920s ===
General election 1929: Lincoln
Party	Candidate	Votes	%	±%
Labour	Robert Taylor	15,176	43.6	+2.3
Unionist	Benjamin Garnet Lampard-Vachell	11,978	34.3	−6.8
Liberal	Robert Pattinson	7,719	22.1	+4.5
Majority		3,198	9.3	+9.1
Turnout		34,873	88.5	0.0
Labour hold		Swing	+4.5	

General election 1924: Lincoln
Party	Candidate	Votes	%	±%
Labour	Robert Taylor	11,596	41.3	+7.1
Unionist	George Hamilton	11,557	41.1	−0.9
Liberal	A. G. Macdonell	4,952	17.6	−6.2
Majority		39	0.2	N/A
Turnout		28,105	88.5	+3.0
Labour gain from Unionist		Swing	+4.0	

General election 1923: Lincoln
Party	Candidate	Votes	%	±%
Unionist	Alfred Davies	11,338	42.0	−17.0
Labour	Robert Taylor	9,251	34.2	−6.8
Liberal	A. G. Macdonell	6,447	23.8	New
Majority		2,087	7.8	−10.2
Turnout		27,036	85.5	−0.4
Unionist hold		Swing	−5.1	

General election 1922: Lincoln
Party	Candidate	Votes	%	±%
Unionist	Alfred Davies	15,780	59.0	+11.3
Labour	Robert Taylor	10,951	41.0	+12.5
Majority		4,829	18.0	−1.2
Turnout		26,731	85.9	+11.5
Unionist hold		Swing	−0.6	

=== Elections in the 1910s ===
Roberts

General election 1918: Lincoln
Party		Candidate	Votes	%	±%
C	Unionist	Alfred Davies	11,114	47.7	+0.6
	Labour	Robert Taylor	6,658	28.5	New
	Liberal	Charles Roberts	5,550	23.8	−29.1
Majority			4,456	19.2	N/A
Turnout			23,322	74.4	−15.1
	Unionist gain from Liberal		Swing	+14.8	
C indicates candidate endorsed by the coalition government.

General Election 1914/15

Another General Election was required to take place before the end of 1915. The political parties had been making preparations for an election to take place and by July 1914, the following candidates had been selected;

- Liberal: Charles Roberts
- Unionist: J. Foster

Roberts

General election December 1910: Lincoln
Party	Candidate	Votes	%	±%
Liberal	Charles Roberts	5,484	52.9	+2.7
Conservative	Robert Filmer	4,878	47.1	+17.0
Majority		606	5.8	−14.3
Turnout		10,362	89.5	−3.5
Registered electors		11,577		
Liberal hold		Swing	−7.1	

General election January 1910: Lincoln
Party	Candidate	Votes	%	±%
Liberal	Charles Roberts	5,402	50.2	−1.0
Conservative	Robert Filmer	3,236	30.1	+18.5
Free Trader	Charles Seely	2,129	19.8	−17.4
Majority		2,166	20.1	+6.1
Turnout		10,767	93.0	−0.8
Registered electors		11,577		
Liberal hold		Swing	−9.8	

Seely stood as a 'Liberal Unionist in support of Free Trade'.

=== Elections in the 1900s ===
General election 1906: Lincoln
Party	Candidate	Votes	%	±%
Liberal	Charles Roberts	5,110	51.2	+1.6
Free Trader	Charles Seely	3,718	37.2	+37.2
Conservative	Henry Croft	1,162	11.6	−38.8
Majority		1,392	14.0	N/A
Turnout		9,990	93.8	+4.1
Registered electors		10,645		
Liberal gain from Liberal Unionist		Swing	+20.2	

General election 1900: Lincoln
Party	Candidate	Votes	%	±%
Liberal Unionist	Charles Seely	4,002	50.4	−1.1
Liberal	Charles Roberts	3,935	49.6	+1.1
Majority		67	0.8	−2.2
Turnout		7,937	89.7	−2.0
Registered electors		8,846		
Liberal Unionist hold		Swing	−1.1	

=== Elections in the 1890s ===
General election 1895: Lincoln
Party	Candidate	Votes	%	±%
Liberal Unionist	Charles Seely	3,808	51.5	+3.2
Liberal	William Crosfield	3,590	48.5	−3.2
Majority		218	3.0	N/A
Turnout		7,398	91.7	+2.1
Registered electors		8,068		
Liberal Unionist gain from Liberal		Swing	+3.2	

General election 1892: Lincoln
Party	Candidate	Votes	%	±%
Liberal	William Crosfield	3,410	51.7	+4.3
Conservative	Frederick Kerans	3,186	48.3	−4.3
Majority		224	3.4	N/A
Turnout		6,596	89.6	+8.9
Registered electors		7,358		
Liberal gain from Conservative		Swing	+4.3	

=== Elections in the 1880s ===
General election 1886: Lincoln
Party	Candidate	Votes	%	±%
Conservative	Frederick Kerans	3,159	52.6	+10.6
Liberal	William Crosfield	2,851	47.4	−10.6
Majority		308	5.2	N/A
Turnout		6,010	80.7	−5.6
Registered electors		7,444		
Conservative gain from Liberal		Swing	+10.6	

General election 1885: Lincoln
Party	Candidate	Votes	%	±%
Liberal	Joseph Ruston	3,726	58.0	−16.9
Conservative	Frederick Kerans	2,701	42.0	+16.9
Majority		1,025	16.0	+5.2
Turnout		6,427	86.3	−1.0 (est)
Registered electors		7,444		
Liberal hold		Swing	−16.9	

By-election, 16 Jun 1884: Lincoln (1 seat)
Party	Candidate	Votes	%	±%
Liberal	Joseph Ruston	3,234	58.8	−16.1
Conservative	Richard Hall	2,263	41.2	+16.1
Majority		971	17.6	+6.8
Turnout		5,497	81.2	−6.1 (est)
Registered electors		6,769		
Liberal hold		Swing	−16.1	

- Caused by Palmer's death.

General election 1880: Lincoln (2 seats)
Party	Candidate	Votes	%	±%
Liberal	Charles Seely	3,401	39.0	+6.1
Liberal	John Hinde Palmer	3,128	35.9	+5.1
Conservative	Edward Chaplin	2,190	25.1	−11.2
Majority		938	10.8	N/A
Turnout		5,591 (est)	87.3 (est)	+3.0
Registered electors		6,402		
Liberal gain from Conservative		Swing	+5.9	
Liberal hold		Swing	+5.4	

=== Elections in the 1870s ===
General election 1874: Lincoln (2 seats)
Party	Candidate	Votes	%	±%
Conservative	Edward Chaplin	2,107	36.3	New
Liberal	Charles Seely	1,907	32.9	N/A
Liberal	John Hinde Palmer	1,784	30.8	N/A
Majority		223	5.5	N/A
Turnout		3,953 (est)	84.3 (est)	N/A
Registered electors		4,689		
Conservative gain from Liberal		Swing	N/A	
Liberal hold		Swing	N/A	

=== Elections in the 1860s ===
General election 1868: Lincoln (2 seats)
Party	Candidate	Votes	%	±%
Liberal	Charles Seely	Unopposed		
Liberal	John Hinde Palmer	Unopposed		
Registered electors		4,243		
Liberal hold				
Liberal hold				

General election 1865: Lincoln (2 seats)
Party	Candidate	Votes	%	±%
Liberal	Charles Seely	878	34.9	+3.9
Liberal	Edward Heneage	870	34.6	+2.1
Conservative	John Bramley-Moore	765	30.4	−6.1
Majority		105	4.2	N/A
Turnout		1,639 (est)	95.7 (est)	−0.7
Registered electors		1,713		
Liberal hold		Swing	+3.5	
Liberal gain from Conservative		Swing	+2.6	

By-election, 12 February 1862: Lincoln
Party	Candidate	Votes	%	±%
Conservative	John Bramley-Moore	715	50.9	+14.4
Liberal	John Hinde Palmer	690	49.1	−14.4
Majority		25	1.8	−2.2
Turnout		1,405	94.3	−2.1
Registered electors		1,490		
Conservative gain from Liberal		Swing	+14.4	

- Caused by Heneage's resignation.

By-election, 9 November 1861: Lincoln
Party	Candidate	Votes	%	±%
Liberal	Charles Seely	Unopposed		
Liberal gain from Conservative				

- Caused by Sibthorp's death.

=== Elections in the 1850s ===
General election 1859: Lincoln (2 seats)
Party	Candidate	Votes	%	±%
Conservative	Gervaise Sibthorp	740	36.5	−4.7
Liberal	George Heneage	658	32.5	+0.6
Liberal	John Hinde Palmer	629	31.0	+4.1
Majority		82	4.0	−5.3
Turnout		1,384 (est)	96.4 (est)	+24.8
Registered electors		1,435		
Conservative hold		Swing	−4.7	
Liberal hold		Swing	+1.5	

General election 1857: Lincoln (2 seats)
Party	Candidate	Votes	%	±%
Conservative	Gervaise Sibthorp	829	41.2	−1.2
Whig	George Heneage	641	31.9	−1.5
Radical	John Hinde Palmer	541	26.9	+2.7
Turnout		1,006 (est)	71.6 (est)	−1.0
Registered electors		1,405		
Majority		188	9.3	+0.3
Conservative hold		Swing	−1.3	
Majority		100	5.0	−4.2
Whig hold		Swing	−1.4	

By-election, 16 January 1856: Lincoln
Party	Candidate	Votes	%	±%
Conservative	Gervaise Sibthorp	Unopposed		
Conservative hold				

- Caused by Sibthorp's death.

General election 1852: Lincoln (2 seats)
Party	Candidate	Votes	%	±%
Conservative	Charles Sibthorp	840	42.4	−7.1
Whig	George Heneage	661	33.4	+10.3
Radical	Charles Seely	478	24.2	−3.2
Turnout		990 (est)	72.6 (est)	−1.8
Registered electors		1,363		
Majority		179	9.0	+1.6
Conservative hold		Swing	−8.7	
Majority		183	9.2	N/A
Whig gain from Radical		Swing	+6.8	

=== Elections in the 1840s ===
By-election, 16 March 1848: Lincoln
Party	Candidate	Votes	%	±%
Radical	Thomas Hobhouse	552	52.2	+1.7
Conservative	Lebbeus Charles Humfrey	505	47.8	−1.7
Majority		47	4.4	−8.3
Turnout		1,057	83.2	+8.8
Registered electors		1,271		
Radical hold		Swing	+1.7	

- Caused by Seely's election being declared void on petition, due to bribery by his agent, on 10 March 1848.

General election 1847: Lincoln (2 seats)
Party	Candidate	Votes	%	±%
Conservative	Charles Sibthorp	659	34.8	+4.8
Radical	Charles Seely	518	27.4	+8.6
Whig	Edward Bulwer-Lytton	436	23.1	−1.4
Conservative	William Rickford Collett	278	14.7	−11.9
Turnout		946 (est)	74.4 (est)	−11.0
Registered electors		1,271		
Majority		141	7.4	+5.3
Conservative hold		Swing	+0.6	
Majority		240	12.7	N/A
Radical gain from Conservative		Swing	+6.1	

General election 1841: Lincoln (2 seats)
Party	Candidate	Votes	%	±%
Conservative	Charles Sibthorp	541	30.0	−0.7
Conservative	William Rickford Collett	481	26.6	+3.2
Whig	Edward Bulwer-Lytton	443	24.5	−1.6
Radical	Charles Seely	340	18.8	N/A
Majority		38	2.1	−8.9
Turnout		932	85.4	+2.4
Registered electors		1,091		
Conservative hold		Swing	+0.1	
Conservative gain from Whig		Swing	+2.0	

=== Elections in the 1830s ===
General election 1837: Lincoln (2 seats)
Party	Candidate	Votes	%	±%
Conservative	Charles Sibthorp	514	30.7	+9.1
Whig	Edward Bulwer-Lytton	436	26.1	−5.0
Conservative	Henry Ellis	392	23.4	+1.8
Whig	Charles Henry Churchill	330	19.7	−6.0
Turnout		864	83.0	+4.3
Registered electors		1,041		
Majority		184	11.0	−1.2
Conservative hold		Swing	+7.3	
Majority		44	2.7	
Whig hold		Swing	−5.2	

General election 1835: Lincoln (2 seats)
Party	Candidate	Votes	%	±%
Conservative	Charles Sibthorp	565	43.3	+15.3
Whig	Edward Bulwer-Lytton	406	31.1	−3.0
Whig	Charles Beaumont Phipps	335	25.7	−12.1
Majority		159	12.2	N/A
Turnout		885	78.7	−5.5
Registered electors		1,124		
Conservative gain from Whig		Swing	+15.2	
Whig hold		Swing	−5.3	

General election 1832: Lincoln (2 seats)
Party	Candidate	Votes	%
Whig	George Heneage	543	37.8
Whig	Edward Bulwer-Lytton	490	34.1
Tory	Charles Sibthorp	402	28.0
Majority		88	6.1
Turnout		878	84.2
Registered electors		1,043	
Whig hold			
Whig gain from Tory			

General election 1831: Lincoln (2 seats)
Party	Candidate	Votes	%
Tory	Charles Sibthorp	Unopposed	
Whig	George Heneage	Unopposed	
Registered electors		c. 1,400	
Tory hold			
Whig gain from Tory			

General election 1830: Lincoln (2 seats)
Party	Candidate	Votes	%
Tory	John Fardell (MP)	Unopposed	
Tory	Charles Sibthorp	Unopposed	
Registered electors		c. 1,400	
Tory hold			
Tory gain from Whig			

== See also ==
- List of parliamentary constituencies in Lincolnshire

== Sources ==
- Guardian Unlimited Politics (Election results from 1992 to the present)
- Politicsresources.net – Official Web Site ✔ (Election results from 1951 to the present)
- Craig, F. W. S. (1989) [1977]. British parliamentary election results 1832–1885 (2nd ed.). Chichester: Parliamentary Research Services. p. 187. ISBN 978-0-900178-26-9.
- Craig, F. W. S. (1989) [1974]. British parliamentary election results 1885–1918 (2nd ed.). Chichester: Parliamentary Research Services. p. 137. ISBN 978-0-900178-27-6.
- Craig, F. W. S. (1983) [1969]. British parliamentary election results 1918–1949 (3rd ed.). Chichester: Parliamentary Research Services. p. 172. ISBN 978-0-900178-06-1.
