= Werk =

Werk may refer to:

- Elliot Werk (born 1957), Democratic politician from Boise, Idaho
- Nicholas Werk (born 14th-century), English politician
- colloquial name for Třinec Iron and Steel Works in the Czech Republic
- WERK, a radio station in Muncie, Indiana
- Werk 80, a 1997 album by German band Atrocity
- Werk Arena, an indoor sporting arena in Třinec, Czech Republic
- Werk Discs, an independent record label based in London
- German and Dutch for work
