= Richard Clerke (died 1530) =

English politician

Richard Clerke (by 1476–1530) was an English politician.

Educated in the law at Lincoln's Inn, by 1511 he had been appointed Recorder of Lincoln, a position he held until his death.

He was a member (MP) of the parliament of England for Lincoln in 1512, 1515 and 1523.

He was married with one daughter.
