= Beesby =

Beesby may refer to:

- Beesby, East Lindsey, Lincolnshire, England
- Beesby, North East Lincolnshire, a deserted medieval village in Hawerby cum Beesby, North East Lincolnshire, Lincolnshire, England, see Grimsby Rural District
- Gilbert Beesby, MP for Lincoln
