= John Bigge (disambiguation) =

John Bigge (1780–1843) was an English judge and royal commissioner

John Bigge may also refer to:

- John Bigge (MP) (fl. 1411–1421), MP for Lincoln

== See also ==
- John Bigg (disambiguation)
- John Biggs (disambiguation)
