= Broxholme (surname) =

Broxholme is a surname. Notable people with the surname include:

- John Broxholme (died 1647), English politician
- John Franklin Broxholme (1930–2000), pseudonym Duncan Kyle, English thriller writer
- Noel Broxholme (1686–1748), English physician
