= Missenden =

Missenden may refer to:

- Great Missenden, Buckinghamshire, England
- Little Missenden, Buckinghamshire, England
- Great Missenden railway station, Buckinghamshire, England
- Missenden Abbey, Buckinghamshire, England
- Anthony Missenden (1505–1542), British Member of Parliament
- Eustace Missenden
