= Dalderby (surname) =

Dalderby is a surname. Notable people with the surname include:

- John Dalderby (died 1320), medieval Bishop of Lincoln
- John Dalderby (MP) (fl. 1413), English politician
- William Dalderby (fl. 1383–1404), English politician
