= Hugh Skarlet =

MP for Lincoln

Hugh Skarlet was the first MP for Lincoln, he served alongside Henry de Windsor from January 1307 until 1369 and was succeeded by John Sutton.

In 1321, the abbot and convent of Monsterol sold the Priory of St. Winwaloe, Wereham to Skarlet and it was conveyed by him to Elizabeth de Clare, the foundress of Clare College, Cambridge.
