= William Crosfield =

Member of Parliament for Lincoln
- In office 4 July 1892 – 13 July 1895
- Preceded by: Frederick Kerans
- Succeeded by: Charles Seely

Personal details
- Born: 1838 United Kingdom
- Died: 17 May 1909 (aged 71) United Kingdom
- Party: Liberal

William Crosfield (1838 – 17 May 1909) was a British Liberal Party politician who served as the Member of Parliament for Lincoln, Lincolnshire in the 25th Parliament between 1892 and 1895.

A Congregationalist, William Crosfield was head of the sugar firm of Messrs. George Crosfield and Company. He was a member of the Mersey Docks and Harbour Board, and took an interest in civic and philanthropic organizations in Liverpool. He died suddenly of apoplexy at Liverpool Town Hall on 17 May 1909.

Parliament of the United Kingdom
Preceded by Frederick Kerans	Member of Parliament for Lincoln; 1892 – 1895	Succeeded by Charles Seely
