= Robert Arthur Taylor =

English M.P. for Lincoln

Robert Arthur Taylor (17 October 1886 – 5 April 1934) was an English politician, Labour MP for Lincoln from 1924 to 1931.

Taylor was born in Metheringham in Lincolnshire, and became a tailor in Lincoln. He also studied at Ruskin College. He was a supporter of the Labour Party, and served on Lincoln City Council from 1914. He stood unsuccessfully in Lincoln at the 1918 United Kingdom general election, and again in 1922 and 1923, before finally winning the seat in 1924.

Taylor lost his seat at the 1931 United Kingdom general election, and in 1933 became an organiser for the Shop Assistants' Union. However, he was in poor health and died the following year.

== Notes ==
Parliament of the United Kingdom
| Preceded by Alfred Davies | Member of Parliament for Lincoln; 1924 – 1931 | Succeeded by Walter Liddall |
