= Kerans =

Kerans is a surname. Notable people with the surname include:

- Frederick Kerans (1849–1894), British barrister and politician
- Grattan Kerans (1941–2019), American politician
- John Kerans (1915–1985), British Royal Navy officer and politician
- Lori Kerans (born 1963), American basketball coach
- Sally Kerans (born 1960), American politician
