= Henry Windsor =

Henry Windsor may refer to:

- Henry de Windsor (fl. 1307), English Member of Parliament
- Henry Windsor (1562–1605), 5th Baron Windsor
- Henry Thomas Windsor (1796–1848), British and American merchant
- Henry Windsor Villiers-Stuart (1827–1895), British soldier
- Henry Haven Windsor (1859–1924), American writer
- Prince Henry, Duke of Gloucester (1900–1974), third son of George V and member of the House of Windsor
- Prince Henry, Duke of Sussex (born 1984), youngest son of Charles III and member of the House of Windsor

== See also ==
- Harry Windsor (disambiguation)
