= 1971 Speaker of the British House of Commons election =

Election for House of Commons Speaker

← 1965	12 January 1971	1976 →
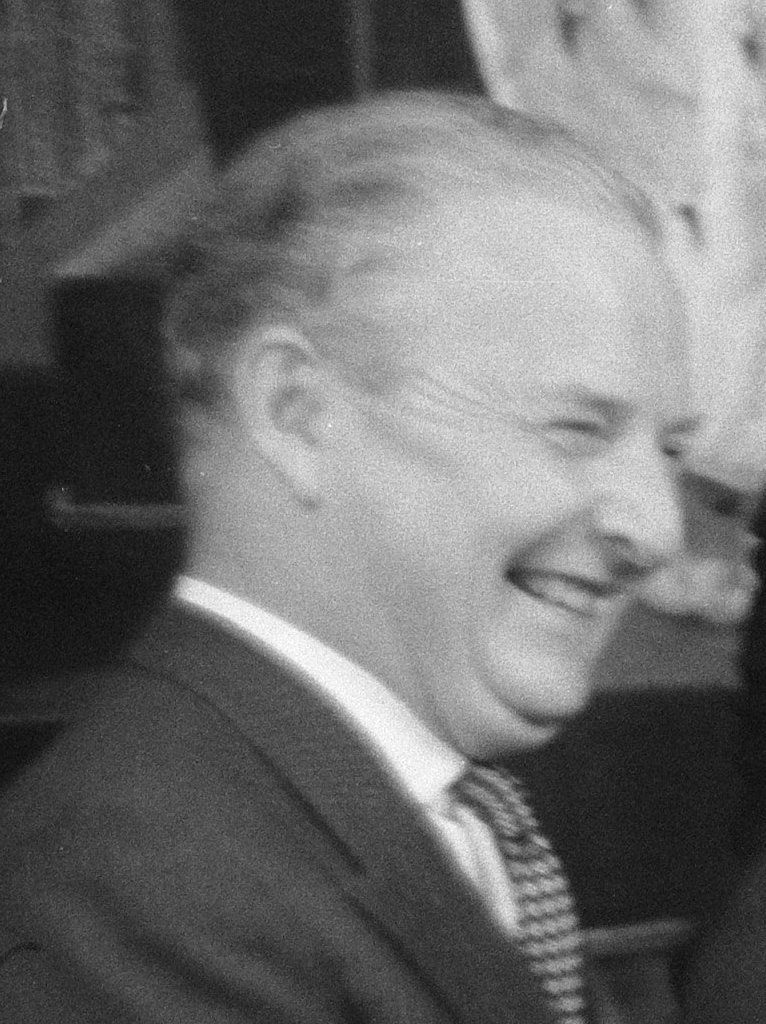

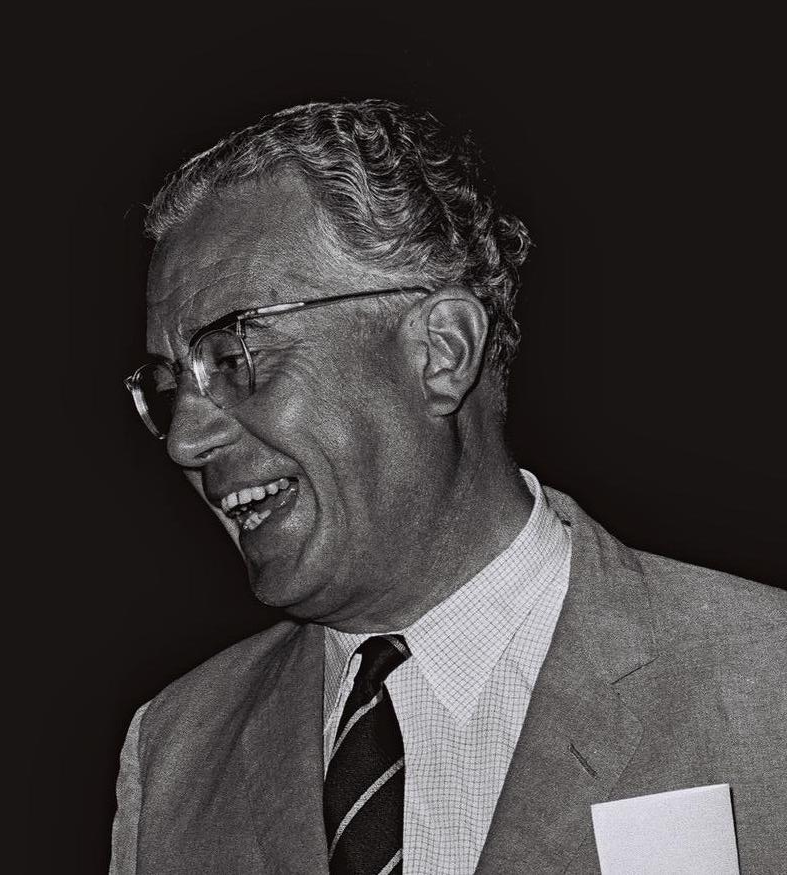
Candidate	Selwyn Lloyd	Sir Geoffrey de Freitas
Party	Conservative	Labour
Constituency	Wirral	Kettering
Popular vote	294	55
Percentage	84.2%	15.8%
Speaker before election
Horace King
Labour
Elected Speaker
Selwyn Lloyd
Conservative

The 1971 election of the Speaker of the House of Commons occurred on 12 January 1971, following the retirement of the previous Speaker Horace King. The election resulted in the election of Conservative MP Selwyn Lloyd, formerly Chancellor of the Exchequer and Foreign Secretary. It was the first election with more than one nominee since William Morrison defeated Major James Milner in the 1951 election.

Following tradition, the election was chaired by the clerk of the house, Barnett Cocks, and all speeches were directed at him. As he was not a member of the house, he could not speak himself and merely pointed at the next MP to speak in the debate. This proved problematic given that the debate was controversial, with allegations that Selwyn Lloyd's nomination had been stitched up between the two front benches and then announced without consulting backbenchers or minor parties. Later elections of Speakers would be chaired by the Father of the House.

However, under the rules at the time, any MP could be nominated for Speaker with or without their consent or knowledge. Labour MP Sir Geoffrey de Freitas was nominated against his wishes to stand against Lloyd. Subsequently, the rules were changed to require the consent of a nominee for Speaker before he or she could be nominated.

== Nominated candidates ==
- Selwyn Lloyd (Conservative)
- Sir Geoffrey de Freitas (Labour)

== Election ==
The election was conducted by means of a conventional parliamentary motion, originally to elect Selwyn Lloyd. He was proposed and seconded by Conservative MP Dame Irene Ward and Labour MP Charles Pannell respectively.

Conservative MP Robin Maxwell-Hyslop moved an amendment to the original motion to elect Geoffrey De Freitas, who was then seconded by Labour MP Willie Hamilton.

Lloyd then gave a speech of submission to the will of the House, but De Freitas followed by stating he had not been consulted by anyone who proposed his name and stated his support for Lloyd.

== Results ==
MPs then voted on the motion that Selwyn Lloyd take the Chair as Speaker, which was approved by 294 votes to 55. Lloyd was thus conducted to the Speaker's Chair by Charles Pannell and Dame Irene Ward.
