= Harry Windsor =

Harry Windsor may refer to:

- Harry Windsor (surgeon) (1914–1987), Australian cardiac surgeon
- Prince Harry, Duke of Sussex (born 1984), youngest son of Charles III and member of the House of Windsor
- Colonel Harry Windsor, a fictional character in Axis of Time

== See also ==
- Harry Windsor-Fry (1862–1947), British painter
- Henry Windsor (disambiguation)
