= Gillian Merron =

British Labour politician (born 1959)

The Right Honourable The Baroness Merron
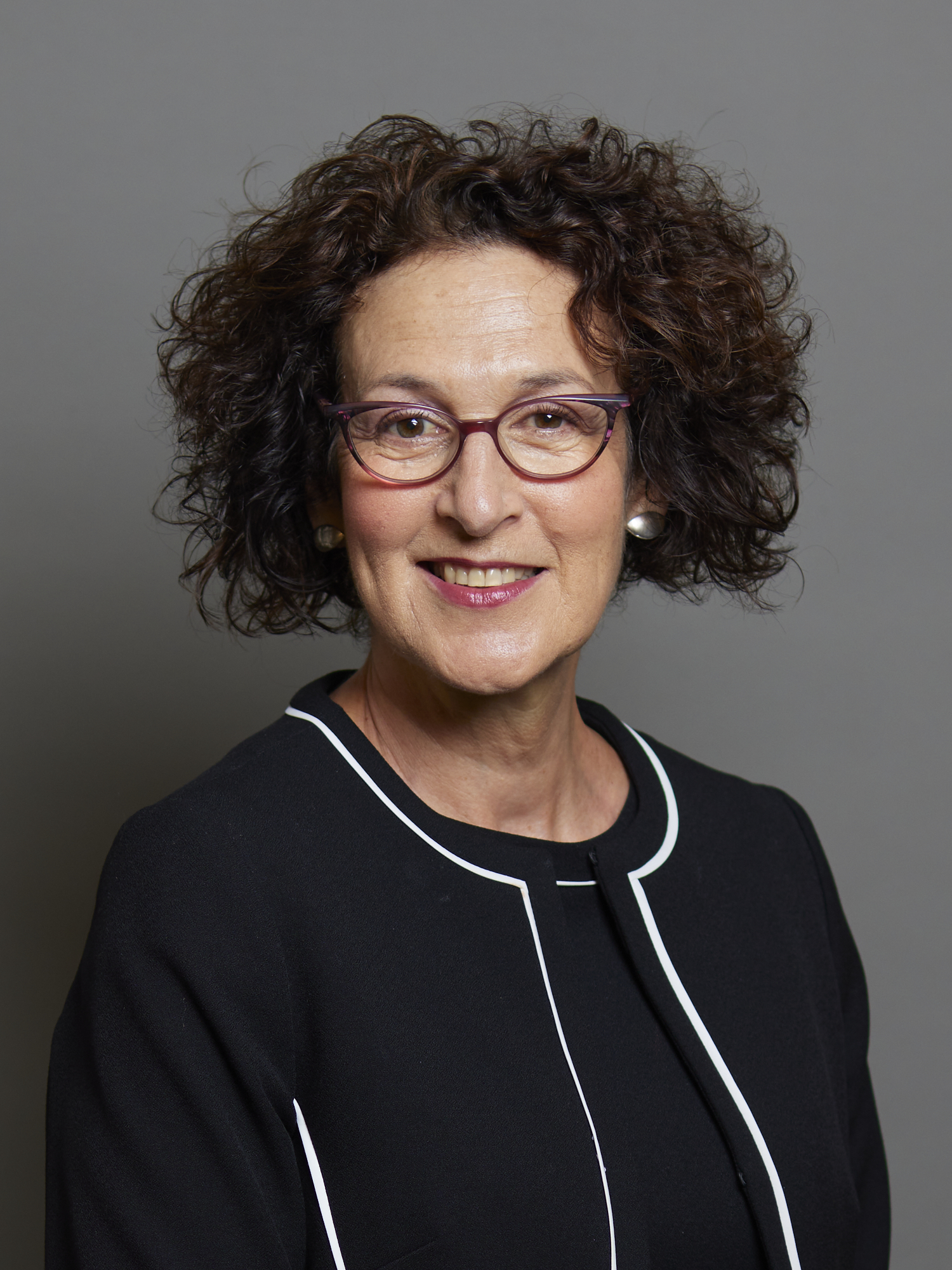
- Official portrait, 2021

Parliamentary Under-Secretary of State for Women's Health and Mental Health
- Incumbent
- Assumed office 10 July 2024
- Prime Minister: Keir Starmer; Andy Burnham
- Preceded by: Maria Caulfield

Minister of State for Public Health
- In office 10 June 2009 – 11 May 2010
- Prime Minister: Gordon Brown
- Preceded by: Dawn Primarolo
- Succeeded by: Anne Milton

Parliamentary Under-Secretary of State for Foreign and Commonwealth Affairs
- In office 6 October 2008 – 10 June 2009
- Prime Minister: Gordon Brown
- Preceded by: Meg Munn
- Succeeded by: Chris Bryant

Parliamentary Under-Secretary of State for International Development
- In office 25 January 2008 – 6 October 2008
- Prime Minister: Gordon Brown
- Preceded by: Shriti Vadera
- Succeeded by: Ivan Lewis

Minister for the East Midlands
- In office 28 June 2007 – 25 January 2008
- Prime Minister: Gordon Brown
- Preceded by: Office established
- Succeeded by: Phil Hope

Parliamentary Secretary for the Cabinet Office
- In office 28 June 2007 – 24 January 2008
- Prime Minister: Gordon Brown
- Preceded by: Pat McFadden
- Succeeded by: Tom Watson

Parliamentary Under-Secretary of State for Transport
- In office 8 May 2006 – 27 June 2007
- Prime Minister: Tony Blair
- Preceded by: Karen Buck
- Succeeded by: Jim Fitzpatrick

Lord Commissioner of the Treasury
- In office 17 December 2004 – 8 May 2006
- Prime Minister: Tony Blair
- Preceded by: Derek Twigg
- Succeeded by: Claire Ward
Parliamentary offices
Member of the House of Lords
Lord Temporal
Life peerage 28 January 2021
Member of Parliament for Lincoln
In office 1 May 1997 – 12 April 2010
Preceded by	Kenneth Carlisle
Succeeded by	Karl McCartney

Personal details
- Born: Gillian Joanna Merron; 12 April 1959 (age 67) Ilford, Essex, England
- Party: Labour
- Education: Wanstead High School
- Alma mater: Lancaster University (BSc)
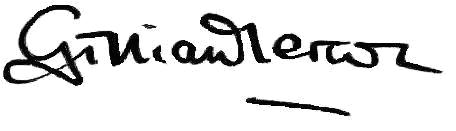
- Signature

Gillian Joanna Merron, Baroness Merron (born 12 April 1959) is a British politician and life peer who was chief executive of the Board of Deputies of British Jews from 2014 to 2021. A member of the Labour Party, she has been the Parliamentary Under-Secretary of State for Patient Safety, Women's Health and Mental Health since 2024. She was the shadow spokesperson for Health and Social Care from 2021 to 2024. She was previously Member of Parliament (MP) for Lincoln from 1997 to 2010 and held several ministerial offices in the Blair and Brown governments.

== Early life and career ==
Merron was born in Ilford, Essex to a Jewish family, and was educated at Wanstead High School in Wanstead in East London. She attended Lancaster University Management School, gaining a BSc in Management Sciences in 1981. She worked in local government and as a NUPE (later UNISON) union official.

Merron joined the Labour Party in 1984. Before becoming an MP, Merron was the vice-chair for the regional Labour Party executive. She coordinated the shadow cabinet central region campaign in the 1992 general election and the 1994 European Parliament election.

== Parliamentary career ==
Merron was made a prospective parliamentary candidate (PPC) through an all-women shortlist, and was elected to the House of Commons in May 1997 with a majority of 11,130. From July 1998 to July 1999, she was Parliamentary Private Secretary (PPS) to Doug Henderson as Minister of State for the Armed Forces and, from July 1999 to June 2001, she was PPS to Baroness Symons as Minister of State for Defence Procurement.

From June 2001 to October 2002, Merron was PPS to John Reid as Secretary of State for Northern Ireland. From October 2002 to May 2006, she was a government whip and was a Lord Commissioner of the Treasury from December 2004. At the 2005 general election, her majority was 4,613.

Merron was appointed to the Department for Transport in May 2006, where she worked until the reshuffle on 29 June 2007, when she became Parliamentary Secretary for the Cabinet Office and the first ever minister of the East Midlands.

Following Peter Hain's resignation on 24 January 2008, Merron was reshuffled again, becoming a Parliamentary Under-Secretary of State in the Department for International Development, leaving both of her previous roles. Following Gordon Brown's next reshuffle on 5 October 2008, Merron was moved to the Foreign Office and Commonwealth Office. A promotion to Minister of State for Public Health soon followed.

Merron followed the party whip in votes on equal gay rights, the hunting ban, foundation hospitals, a ban on smoking in public places, the Iraq war, preventative laws to stop climate change, and The Digital Economy Bill. She lost her seat to the Conservative candidate Karl McCartney in the 2010 general election. From 1997 until 2007, when Quentin Davies defected to the Labour Party, she had been Lincolnshire's only Labour MP – and the first since Margaret Beckett had the seat from 1974 to 1979.

=== Expenses ===
Merron’s expenses as an MP were higher than average. She is one of 98 MPs who voted to support Conservative MP David Maclean's bill to keep their expenses and correspondence secret.

Total expenses claimed
Year	Total Expenses	Ranking	out of
2001/02	£94,459	joint 178th	657
2002/03	£123,954	87th	657
2003/04	£136,706	55th	658
2004/05	£139,854	64th	659
2005/06	£133,480	-	-
2006/07	£144,914	176th	645
2007/08	£155,972	172nd	645

On 19 June 2009, MPs' expenses were revealed (heavily edited) on the internet. Merron received criticism for purchasing a television, television stand, home theatre kit, and numerous other goods. She wrote on her website: "The majority of claims I make directly pay for professional staff, office costs, communication with constituents, and travel. I do not have a second job, do not employ any family members or friends, nor have I taken the annual increase in ministerial salary."

In the aftermath of the United Kingdom parliamentary expenses scandal, Sir Thomas Legg recommended that Gillian Merron repay £6,305.17. She repaid this amount in full.

== Post-parliamentary career ==
Since her defeat at the 2010 general election, Merron has become Chair of Bus Users UK (formerly known as The National Federation of Bus Users).

In May 2014, it was announced that Merron would become Chief Executive of the Board of Deputies of British Jews the following July. She stepped down as chief executive in 2021 upon being appointed to the House of Lords. Since February 2013, she has been a Vice-President of the Jewish Leadership Council. She was external affairs officer on the board of Liberal Judaism from July 2012 to May 2014.

== House of Lords ==
In December 2020, it was announced Merron would be conferred a life peerage after a nomination by Labour Party leader Keir Starmer. She took her seat on 8 February 2021, and made her maiden speech on 13 May during that year's Queen's Speech debate.

In the May shadow cabinet reshuffle, she was appointed to the Shadow Health Team. In the November shadow cabinet reshuffle, she became Shadow Culture Minister.

As part of the coronation of King Charles III, Baroness Merron presented the imperial mantle as a representative of the Jewish community.

== Personal life ==
Merron, who is Vice-President of Liberal Judaism, is a member of the South London Liberal Synagogue and of the Lincolnshire Jewish Community.

Parliament of the United Kingdom
Preceded by Kenneth Carlisle	Member of Parliament for Lincoln; 1997–2010	Succeeded by Karl McCartney
Preceded by Pat McFadden	Parliamentary Secretary for the Cabinet Office; 2007–2008	Succeeded by Tom Watson
New office	Minister for the East Midlands; 2007–2008	Succeeded by Phil Hope
Preceded by Shriti Vadera	Parliamentary Under-Secretary of State for International Development; 24 January 2008 – 5 October 2008	Succeeded by Ivan Lewis
Preceded by Meg Munn	Parliamentary Under-Secretary of State for the Foreign and Commonwealth Office; 5 October 2008 – 8 June 2009	Succeeded by Chris Bryant
Preceded by Dawn Primarolo	Minister of State for Public Health; 8 June 2009 – 12 April 2010	Succeeded by Anne Milton
