= Geoffrey de Freitas =

British politician and diplomat (1913–1982)

The Right Honourable Sir Geoffrey de Freitas KCMG
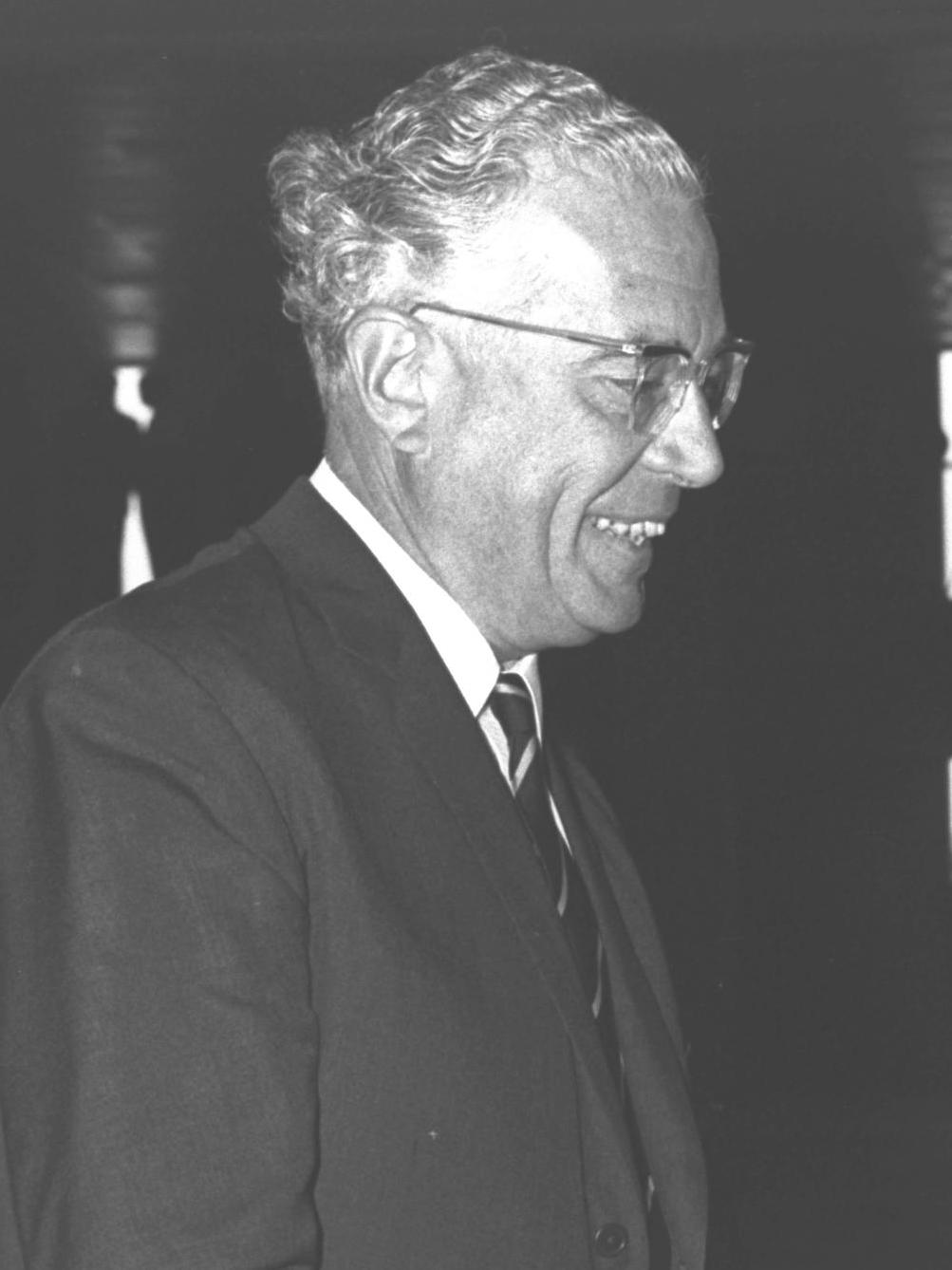
- Geoffrey de Freitas in 1966

High Commissioner of the United Kingdom to Ghana
- In office 1961–1964
- Prime Minister: Harold Macmillan; Alec Douglas-Home
- Preceded by: Arthur Snelling
- Succeeded by: Harold Smedley

Member of Parliament
- In office 15 October 1964 – 7 April 1979
- Preceded by: Gilbert Mitchison
- Succeeded by: William Homewood
- Constituency: Kettering
- In office 23 February 1950 – 13 December 1961
- Preceded by: George Deer
- Succeeded by: Dick Taverne
- Constituency: Lincoln
- In office 5 July 1945 – 3 February 1950
- Preceded by: Sir Frederick Sykes
- Succeeded by: Ian Winterbottom
- Constituency: Nottingham Central

Personal details
- Born: 7 April 1913 St Lucia
- Died: 10 August 1982 (aged 69) Cambridge, England
- Party: Labour
- Spouse: Helen Graham Bell
- Children: 4
- Parent(s): Sir Anthony de Freitas; Edith de Freitas
- Education: Clare College, Cambridge

Sir Geoffrey Stanley de Freitas (7 April 1913 – 10 August 1982) was a British politician and diplomat. For 31 years, a Labour Member of Parliament, he also served as British High Commissioner in Accra and Nairobi, and later as President of the Parliamentary Assembly of the Council of Europe.

== Family and early career ==
Geoffrey de Freitas was the son of Sir Anthony and Lady (Edith) de Freitas. Sir Anthony was Chief Justice of St. Vincent in Geoffrey's youth, and later of British Guiana, having held a variety of legal and administrative posts in the British West Indies.

De Freitas was educated at Haileybury and Clare College, Cambridge, where he was an athlete, and president of the Cambridge Union Society. Two years at Yale followed, with a Mellon Fellowship in international law, and in 1936, on the voyage home, he met his future wife, Helen Graham Bell, a Bryn Mawr graduate and daughter of Laird Bell, a Chicago lawyer and Democrat.

In 1938, they married, and lived in London where de Freitas was pursuing a career as a barrister, gaining political experience as a Labour councillor in Shoreditch, and co-leading a boys' club in Hoxton. During the Second World War he became a squadron leader in the Royal Air Force, but returned to politics in 1945, the family living at Loughton and then Cambridge.

== Parliament and abroad ==
He beat the sitting Conservative MP for Nottingham Central in the 1945 election, and was appointed Parliamentary private secretary to Clement Attlee. As Under-Secretary for Air he went to the United Nations Assembly at Lake Success in 1947. Some years later he would co-author a booklet on the subject of an Atlantic Assembly, and he had a long-standing connection with the North Atlantic Assembly.

In the 1950's general election de Freitas became Member of Parliament for Lincoln. He was appointed Under-Secretary of State for the Home Department and held a succession of front bench posts throughout the decade. For a while Betty Boothroyd was assistant to de Freitas and she remained a friend of the family. Geoffrey and Helen now had three sons and a daughter.

In 1961 de Freitas was nominated to be British High Commissioner to Ghana, and was knighted in October of that year. He resigned his seat in the Commons on 20 December 1961, taking the sinecure of Steward and Bailiff of the Manor of Northstead. He was the first Labour appointment to an important role in one of the newly independent former British colonies. In 1957 he had chaired a Hansard Society conference on parliamentary government in West Africa. After Accra, he was briefly in Nairobi, as British representative supporting an attempt to build a Federation of East Africa which would include Uganda, Tanganyika and Kenya.

In 1964 he was invited to stand for election to represent Kettering, then a safe Labour seat, and returned to England. There was no front bench role for him with Harold Wilson as party leader, but de Freitas led the Labour delegation to the Council of Europe in 1965 and was President of the Parliamentary Assembly of the Council of Europe from 1966–1969.

In 1971 his reluctance to be nominated for election as Speaker of the House of Commons led to a reappraisal of the system. From 1975–1979 de Freitas was a delegate to the European Parliament. He retired from politics in 1979 and died three years later, in Cambridge, aged 69. The autobiography he was writing with his wife, The Slighter Side of a Long Public Life, was published in 1985.

== Notes and sources ==
- Obituary of Geoffrey de Freitas in The Times (13 August 1982)
- Who was Who
- Obituary of Helen de Freitas in The Independent (17 December 1998)

== See also ==
- 1962 Lincoln by-election
- 1971 Speaker of the British House of Commons election

Parliament of the United Kingdom
Preceded by Sir Frederick Sykes	Member of Parliament for Nottingham Central; 1945–1950	Succeeded by Ian Winterbottom
Preceded by George Deer	Member of Parliament for Lincoln; 1950–1961	Succeeded by Dick Taverne
Preceded by Gilbert Mitchison	Member of Parliament for Kettering; 1964–1979	Succeeded by William Homewood
Diplomatic posts
Preceded by Sir Arthur Snelling	High Commissioner to Ghana; 1961–1964	Succeeded by Sir Harold Smedley
Political offices
Preceded by Pierre Pflimlin	President of the Parliamentary Assembly of the Council of Europe; 1966–1969	Succeeded by Olivier Reverdin
