= John Farmery (politician) =

English politician

John Farmery (1591–1647) was an English politician who sat in the House of Commons in 1640. He supported the Royalist side in the English Civil War.

Farmery was the son of William Farmery, Rector of Heapham, Lincolnshire and his wife Cassandra Newland of Hackney. He was baptised at Springthorpe, Lincolnshire on 24 February 1591. He matriculated from St John's College, Cambridge at Easter 1607. He was awarded BA in 1611 and MA in 1614 and LLD in 1620. In 1624, he was incorporated at Oxford University. He was admitted as an advocate on 6 May 1637 and was chancellor of the diocese of Lincoln.

In April 1640, Farmery was elected Member of Parliament for Lincoln in the Short Parliament. He received regimental command in the Royalist army in the civil war.

Farmery died at the age of 56.

Farmery married and left a son also named John.

Parliament of England
Vacant Parliament suspended since 1629	Member of Parliament for Lincoln; 1640; With: Thomas Grantham	Succeeded by Thomas Grantham; John Broxholme
