= Dick Taverne =

English barrister and politician (1928–2025)

The Right Honourable The Lord Taverne KC
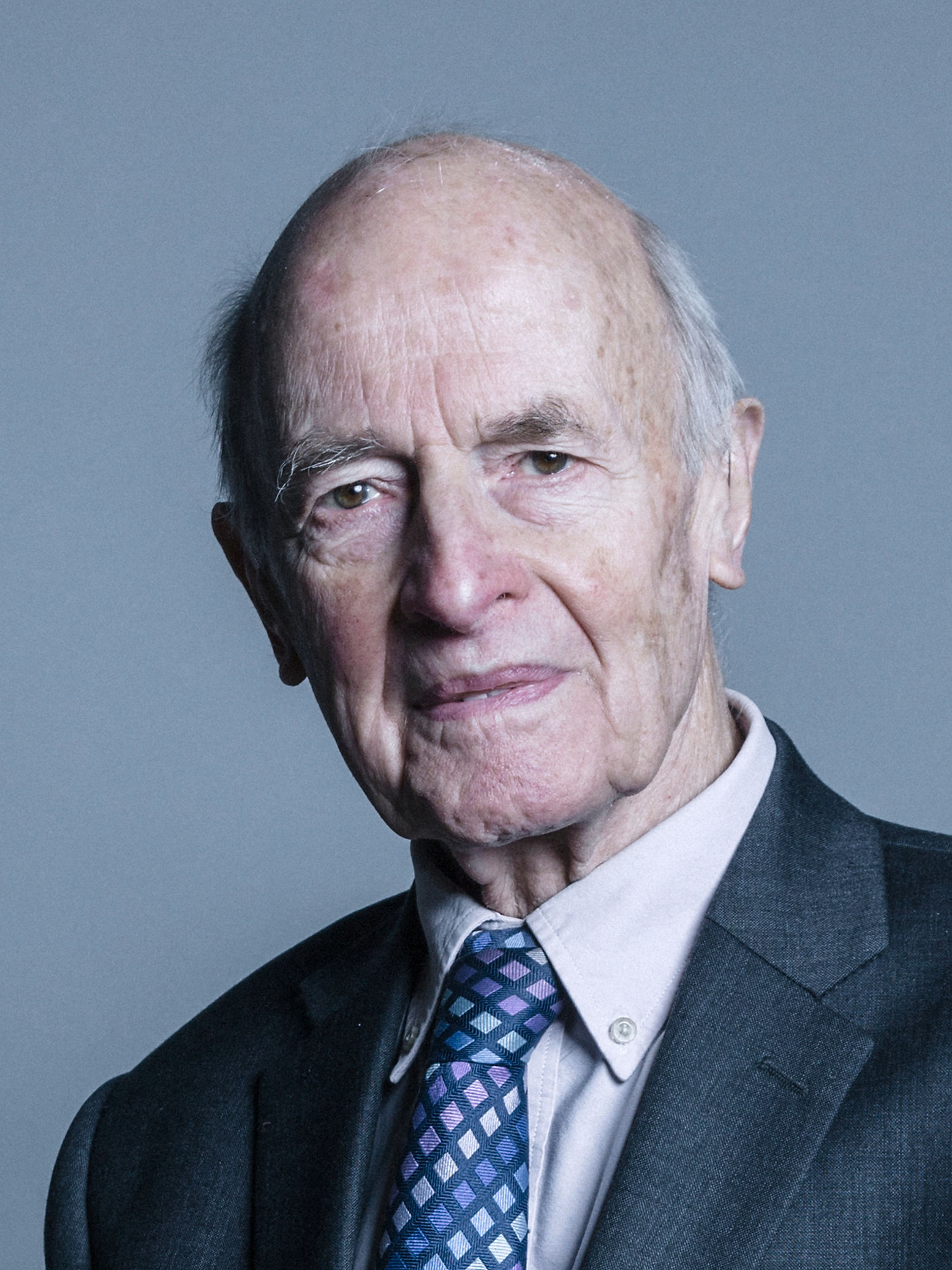
- Official portrait, 2018

Financial Secretary to the Treasury
- In office 13 October 1969 – 19 June 1970
- Prime Minister: Harold Wilson
- Preceded by: Harold Lever
- Succeeded by: Patrick Jenkin

Minister of State for the Treasury
- In office 6 April 1968 – 13 October 1969
- Prime Minister: Harold Wilson
- Preceded by: Office established
- Succeeded by: Bill Rodgers

Parliamentary Under-Secretary of State for the Home Department
- In office 6 April 1966 – 6 April 1968
- Prime Minister: Harold Wilson
- Preceded by: George Thomas
- Succeeded by: Elystan Morgan

Member of the House of Lords
- Lord Temporal
- Life peerage 5 February 1996 – 7 March 2025

Member of Parliament for Lincoln
- In office 8 March 1962 – 20 September 1974
- Preceded by: Geoffrey de Freitas
- Succeeded by: Margaret Jackson

Personal details
- Born: 18 October 1928 Sumatra, Dutch East Indies
- Died: 25 October 2025 (aged 97) London, England
- Party: Labour (until 1972); Democratic Labour (1972–80); SDP (1981–88); Liberal Democrats (1988–2025)
- Children: 2, including Suzanna
- Education: Balliol College, Oxford

Dick Taverne, Baron Taverne (18 October 1928 – 25 October 2025) was a British politician and life peer who served as Member of Parliament (MP) for Lincoln from 1962 to 1974. A member of the Liberal Democrats, he was a Labour MP until his deselection in 1972, following which he resigned his seat and won the subsequent by-election in 1973 as a Democratic Labour candidate.

Taverne's 1973 victory in Lincoln was short-lived; despite retaining his seat at the February 1974 general election, Labour regained the seat at the October 1974 general election, by the future cabinet minister Margaret Beckett. However, his success opened the possibility of a realignment on the left of British politics, which took shape in 1981 as the Social Democratic Party (SDP), which Taverne joined. He later joined the Liberal Democrats when the SDP merged with the Liberal Party. Taverne sat as a Liberal Democrat life peer in the House of Lords from 1996 until 2025.

== Early life and career ==
Taverne was born in Sumatra on 18 October 1928, and was a Dutch national by birth; he was naturalised as British at age 21. Educated at Charterhouse School, and then Balliol College, Oxford, he graduated in Philosophy and Ancient History, qualified as a barrister in 1954 and became a Queen's Counsel (QC) in 1965.

Taverne unsuccessfully contested Putney as the Labour Party candidate at the 1959 general election, and was elected as the Member of Parliament (MP) for Lincoln at a by-election in March 1962. Under Harold Wilson's premiership in the 1960s, he served as a Home Office Minister from 1966 to 1968, Minister of State at the Treasury from 1968 to 1969 and then as Financial Secretary to the Treasury from 1969 to 1970. In 1970, he helped to launch the Institute for Fiscal Studies, now an influential independent think tank and was the first Director, later chairman.

In 1972, Taverne was deselected by the Lincoln Constituency Labour Party, who disagreed with his pro-European Economic Community views. He then resigned from the Labour Party and from Parliament, and formed the Lincoln Democratic Labour Association. He was re-elected as an Independent Democratic Labour candidate at a by-election in March 1973, and held the seat at the February 1974 general election.

Taverne lost his seat in Parliament at the October 1974 general election, but he continued to remain active with the Democratic Labour Association. He was a leading social democratic thinker, publishing The Future of the Left: Lincoln and After in 1974.

When the Social Democratic Party (SDP) was formed in the early 1980s, he joined them, serving on their national committee from 1981 until 1987. He stood as an SDP candidate in the 1982 Peckham by-election, coming second with 32% of the vote, and in the 1983 general election, he stood in Dulwich, coming third. When the SDP merged with the Liberal Party he joined the new Liberal Democrats, serving on its Federal Policy Committee from 1989 until 1990. On 5 February 1996 he was created a life peer as Baron Taverne, of Pimlico in the City of Westminster, and sat in the House of Lords as a Liberal Democrat. In May 2006 he was an unsuccessful candidate for the Liberal Democrats in local elections to Westminster City Council in the Marylebone High Street ward.

Taverne was elected President of the Research Defence Society in 2004. He was a member of the House of Lords Committee on the Use of Animals in Scientific Procedures, and was also a member of the Science and Technology Committee of the House of Lords.

== Personal life and death ==
In 1955, Taverne married Janice Hennessey, a microbiologist. He had two daughters, one of whom is former investment banker Suzanna. He became interested in science and public policy, and in 2002 founded Sense about Science, a charity with the objective of advancing public understanding of science and the evidence-based approach to scientific issues.

Taverne was an Honorary Associate of the National Secular Society and a Distinguished Supporter of Humanists UK, as well as a vice-chair of the All Party Parliamentary Humanist Group. He was also a member of the Steering Committee of the Bilderberg Group. Taverne won the Science Writers' Award as Parliamentary Science Communicator of the Year 2005. He was a listed member of Republic, the campaign for abolishing the monarchy.

On 15 September 2010, Taverne, along with 54 other public figures, signed an open letter published in The Guardian, stating their opposition to Pope Benedict XVI's state visit to the UK.

Taverne was interviewed in 2012 as part of The History of Parliament's oral history project.

He was the author of The March of Unreason, published by Oxford University Press in May 2005. It won him the Association of British Science Writers' award as parliamentary communicator of the year. In 2014, Taverne published his memoir, Against the Tide.

Taverne died at his home in London, on 25 October 2025, at the age of 97. Andrew Copson wrote of Taverne that "His legacy lies not only in the causes he advanced but the manner in which he did so: calm, rigorous, and humane. He showed how a humanist outlook can anchor an ethical and courageous public life."

== Books ==
- Taverne, Dick (1974). The Future of the Left: Lincoln and After. ISBN 0-224-00950-8.
- Taverne, Dick (2005). The March of Unreason: Science, Democracy and the New Fundamentalism. Oxford University Press. ISBN 0-19-280485-5.
- Stanley Feldman, Dr; Marks, Vincent (28 July 2006). Contributed to Panic Nation: Unpicking the Myths We're Told About Food and Health. John Blake. ISBN 9781857828405.
- Taverne, Dick (2014). Against The Tide: Politics and Beyond. Biteback. ISBN 978-1849546690.

== See also ==
- List of UK minor party and independent MPs elected
- Lincoln Democratic Labour Association
- Candidate deselection (Labour Party)

Parliament of the United Kingdom
Preceded by Sir Geoffrey de Freitas	Member of Parliament for Lincoln; 1962 – Oct 1974	Succeeded by Margaret Jackson
Political offices
Preceded by Harold Lever	Financial Secretary to the Treasury; 1969–1970	Succeeded by Patrick Jenkin
