= Robert Walsh (MP) =

English politician

Robert Walsh (fl. 1417–1435), of Lincoln, was an English politician.

He was a member (MP) of the parliament of England for Lincoln in 1417, December 1421, 1422, 1425, 1426, 1427, 1429, 1431, 1433 and 1435.
