= George Deer =

British trade union official and politician

George Deer, OBE (29 March 1890 – 15 May 1974) was a British trade union official and politician.

== Early career ==
Deer went to an elementary school in Grimsby. He began work at the age of 12 and worked on the railways, at the docks and in engineering shops; he was also a commercial traveller. In 1915, he became a full-time organiser for the Workers' Union, covering a new East Midlands district, serving until 1918, when he became an official for the National Union of Dock, Riverside and General Workers. Following its merger, he transferred into the Transport and General Workers' Union. At the age of 17, Deer had joined the Independent Labour Party and he was active in the Labour Party. His wife, Olive Stoakes was also active in the party and was an Alderman and member of the London County Council. In 1916 he received his Army call up, but became a conscientious objector, for which he was jailed in Wormwood Scrubs.

== Revolutionary politics ==
Deer opposed the First World War and served on the executive committee of the British Socialist Party from 1916 to 1920. During the latter period he was involved with the foundation of the Communist Party of Great Britain (CPGB), participating in a Provisional Committee which prepared the Founding Conference, in London on 31 July – 1 August 1920. He was elected onto the Executive Committee of the CPGB, but did not remain on this body for the full year.

== Municipal affairs and politics ==
In 1922 Deer was elected as Labour member of Lincoln City Council where he served for sixteen years and was Mayor in 1933–34. He was a Parliamentary candidate at the 1929 and 1931 general elections for Gainsborough, and in the 1935 general election he fought in Lincoln where he lost by 2,684 votes.

== Parliament ==
While serving as Sheriff of Lincoln in 1943–44, Deer was made a member of the Order of British Empire in the New Years' Honours list of 1944. He had been reselected as Labour candidate for Lincoln, and in the 1945 general election he was elected. Deer became popular among fellow MPs, and often took up transport issues which he knew about from his trade union work. He did not rebel against the Labour whip.

At the 1950 general election, Deer changed constituencies to Newark, which was adjacent to Lincoln and slightly better for Labour. He was re-elected there, and served as an Opposition Whip from 1955 to 1959. He was selected in the ballot for Private Member's Bills in 1957 and introduced a Bill to give supplementary benefits to those who had suffered from industrial injuries before 1948, although it did not succeed.

== Retirement ==
Deer's wife was Chairman of the London County Council in 1962-63 and he accompanied her on the many social occasions to which the Chairman was invited. He retired at the 1964 general election. He died in Grimsby aged 84.

Parliament of the United Kingdom
Preceded by Walter Liddall	Member of Parliament for Lincoln; 1945 – 1950	Succeeded by Geoffrey de Freitas
Preceded by Sidney Shephard	Member of Parliament for Newark; 1950 – 1964	Succeeded by Edward Bishop
