= Laird Bell =

American lawyer

- Born: Laird Bell; April 6, 1883; Winona, Minnesota, U.S.
- Died: October 21, 1965 (aged 82); Evanston, Illinois
- Education: Harvard University (BA, MA); University of Chicago (LLB)
- Political party: Democratic

Laird Bell (April 6, 1883–October 21, 1965) was a distinguished attorney and Democrat who founded a leading Chicago law firm and endowed several charitable institutions. Bell was an extraordinarily active contributor in a variety of social and not-for-profit causes. He served most notably as Chairman of the Chicago Council on Foreign Relations, Chairman of the University of Chicago Board of Trustees, and of Carleton College, and President of the Harvard Alumni Association. Bell was also an Overseer of Harvard College from 1948 to 1954.

== Career ==
Bell's active participation in the work of education began as President of the Board of Education of Winnetka, Illinois, in 1919. He was also instrumental in the establishment of the National Merit Scholarship Corporation, then, as now, based in Evanston, Illinois, serving as the first Chair of the Board of Directors. Bell founded a Chicago law firm, Bell, Boyd and Lloyd, which continued to bear his name until its merger with Pittsburgh-based K&L Gates in 2009.

Bell served as the interim Chancellor of the University of Chicago in 1951, during the interregnum between Robert Hutchins and Lawrence A. Kimpton. Prior to that, Bell had been one of Hutchins' chief defenders in several struggles with state legislators concerning academic freedom in the 1930s and 1940s. According to Milton Mayer, Bell was perhaps Hutchins' closest friend during his years at the University of Chicago.

In addition to his legal and philanthropic work, Bell was a senior executive and board member of the Weyerhauser Timber company, where his father, F.S. Bell, served as Chairman of the Board and President of the Laird Norton Company. Bell was active in advising and advocating on behalf of Phil Weyerhauser during the firm's corporate changes during the Depression. Bell was eventually named Chairman of the Board of Weyerhauser, and Bell was also named publisher of the Chicago Daily News, when its publisher, Frank Knox died during the war, in 1944.

In foreign affairs, Bell was perhaps the main "interventionist" in Chicago before World War II, when Chicago was otherwise a national center of isolationism. Bell visited Nazi Germany frequently in the period before World War II, representing US bondholders who had lost more than $1 billion through "reappraisals" by the Reichsbank under the leadership of Hjalmar Schacht. Bell's co-counsel in the representation was John Foster Dulles of the New York firm Sullivan & Cromwell. In 1940–1941, Bell was head of the Chicago chapter of the Committee to Defend America by Aiding the Allies.

Bell received a KBE knighthood for his war-time activities on behalf of British War Relief. Following the war, he then played an active part, for a private citizen, in shaping the new Europe. Bell returned to Germany as a legal adviser to Brigadier General William H. Draper. Jr., Head of the Economics Division, in General Lucius Clay's U.S. Military Government in Germany OMGUS. Draper's group brokered US interests in post-war German corporations. In 1945 and 1946, Bell "stalked the corridors of Foggy Bottom" in a "one-man crusade against 1067," a US rule that proposed a "barbarous" dismantling of Germany. As president of the Alumni Association of Harvard University in June 1947, Bell organized the commencement speeches where Secretary of State George Marshall launched the European Recovery Plan. (General Omar Bradley was the main speaker that day).

In the spring of 1949, Bell joined Columbia President Dwight Eisenhower and a group of other notables, chaired by Allen Dulles, in National Committee for a Free Europe, a private organization which gave aid to intellectuals and political refugees in newly communist European countries. In 1956 he presided over Adlai Stevenson's campaign for the Democratic presidential nomination.

Born in Minnesota, Bell graduated from Harvard College and the University of Chicago Law School. Bell endowed chairs at Carleton College, Harvard University, and the Laird Bell Law Quadrangle at the University of Chicago is named after him.

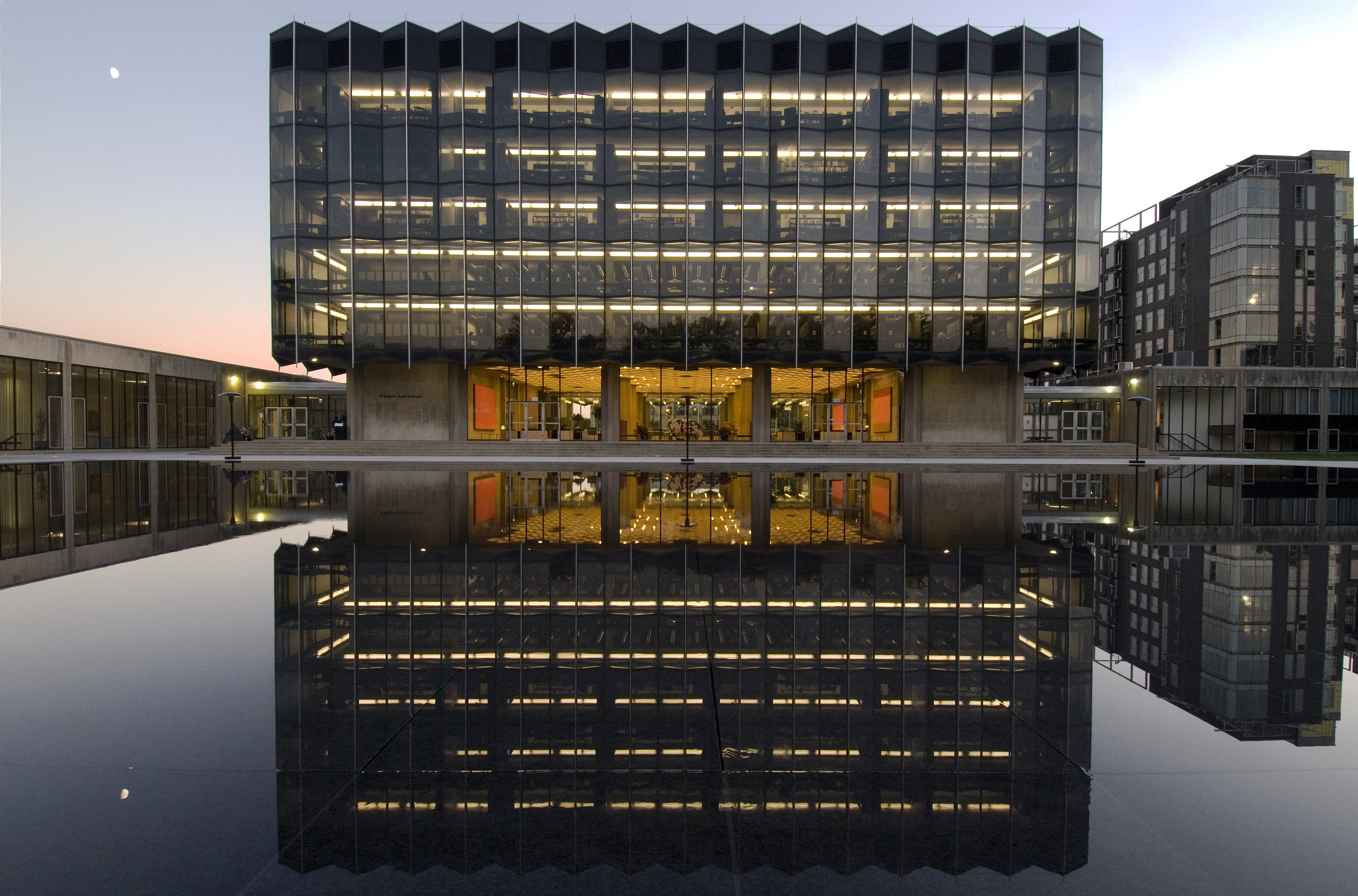
Laird Bell Law Quadrangle at the University of Chicago Law School

== Personal life ==
Bell resided in Chicago's northern suburbs, served on the board of several Chicago charitable organizations and was a member of the University Club. Bell was born in Winona, Minnesota, in 1883 and married Nathalie Fairbank in Chicago in 1909. Nathalie Fairbank was the daughter of the distinguished Fairbank merchant family in Chicago, and her pre-wedding portrait is in storage at the Smithsonian. The eldest of Bell's four daughters, Helen Graham Bell, married a future British MP, Geoffrey de Freitas in 1936. Bell was a parent and Trustee at the North Shore Country Day School, where a meeting room was named after him in 1956. Bell died on October 21, 1965, in a hospital in Evanston, Illinois.

== Legacy ==
On October 12, 1966, the Quadrangle at the University of Chicago Law School was named posthumously after Bell. Former President Hutchins spoke at the dedication.
