= Robert Appleby (MP) =

English politician

Robert Appleby (died 1407), of Lincoln, was an English burgess.

He was elected Mayor of Lincoln for 1402–03 and a member (MP) of the parliament of England for Lincoln in the parliaments assembled in January 1397 and October 1404.
