= George St Poll =

16th-century English politician

George St Poll (by 1499 – 1558/1559), of Louth Park, Lincoln, North Carlton, and Snarford, Lincolnshire, and Lincoln's Inn, London was an English politician.

He was a member (MP) of the Parliament of England for Lincoln in 1542, 1545, 1547, Oct. 1553, Nov. 1554, 1555 and 1558.
