= John Welcome =

English politician (died 1580)

John Welcome (before 1523 – 1580), of the High Street, Lincoln, was an English politician.

He was a member (MP) of the parliament of England for Lincoln in 1572.
