= Suzanna Taverne =

Former Director of the British Museum

Suzanna Taverne is a British former investment banker, finance director and museum director, who was appointed Managing Director of the British Museum in 1999 and left the role 2001. She has also been Finance Director of both the Financial Times and The Independent.

== Biography ==
Taverne is the daughter of Dick Taverne, a former Labour MP. She studied Modern History at the University of Oxford. Prior to her role at the British Museum she worked as director of finance for the Financial Times, as a consultant at Saatchi & Saatchi and as finance director of The Independent.

Taverne was appointed Managing Director of the British Museum in 1999 and left the role in 2001. During her tenure she worked in tandem with Robert Anderson. Taverne was the first person from outside the museum sector to be appointed to this kind of senior role in the organisation. During her tenure, the Great Court redevelopment was delivered.

In 2002 she was appointed Director of Operations at Imperial College, a role she held until 2005. On 1 January 2012 she was appointed a member of the BBC Trust. She was reappointed in 2015. In 2023 she was Chair of the Board of Directors of openDemocracy. As of 2024 she was Deputy Chair of the Council of the British School at Rome.
