= Robert Peck (MP for Lincoln) =

English politician

Robert Peck (died c. 1400), of Lincoln and London, was an English politician.

He was a member (MP) of the parliament of England for Lincoln in January 1390.
