= Thomas Forster (Lincoln MP) =

English politician (fl. 1406–1415)

Thomas Forster (fl. 1406–1415), of Lincoln, was an English politician.

He was elected Mayor of Lincoln for 1407–08 and a member (MP) of the parliament of England for Lincoln in 1406, May 1413 and 1415.
