= Robert Harworth =

Member of the Parliament of England

Parliament of England

Personal details
- Born: 1388
- Died: 1401 (aged 12–13)
- Occupation: politician

Robert Harworth or Fuyster (fl. 1388–1401), of Lincoln, was an English wool merchant, mayor and Member of Parliament.

He was Mayor of Lincoln for 1393–94 and a Member (MP) of the Parliament of England for Lincoln in 1388, 1395 and 1401.
