= John Bigg =

John Bigg may refer to:

- John Bigg (MP) (1652 – c.1710), MP for Huntingdon 1689
- John Bigg (died 1748), MP for Huntingdonshire 1715–1734
- John Stanyan Bigg (1828–1865), English poet
- John Bigg (hermit) (1629–1696), the Dinton hermit

== See also ==
- John Bigge (disambiguation)
- John Big, fictional character
- Jack Bigg (1912–1975), Canadian police officer, lawyer and politician
- John Biggs (disambiguation)
