= Richard Worsop =

English politician

Richard Worsop (fl. 1406–1407), of Lincoln, was an English politician.

He was a member (MP) of the parliament of England for Lincoln in 1406 and 1407.
