= Karl McCartney =

British Conservative politician

Karl McCartney JP
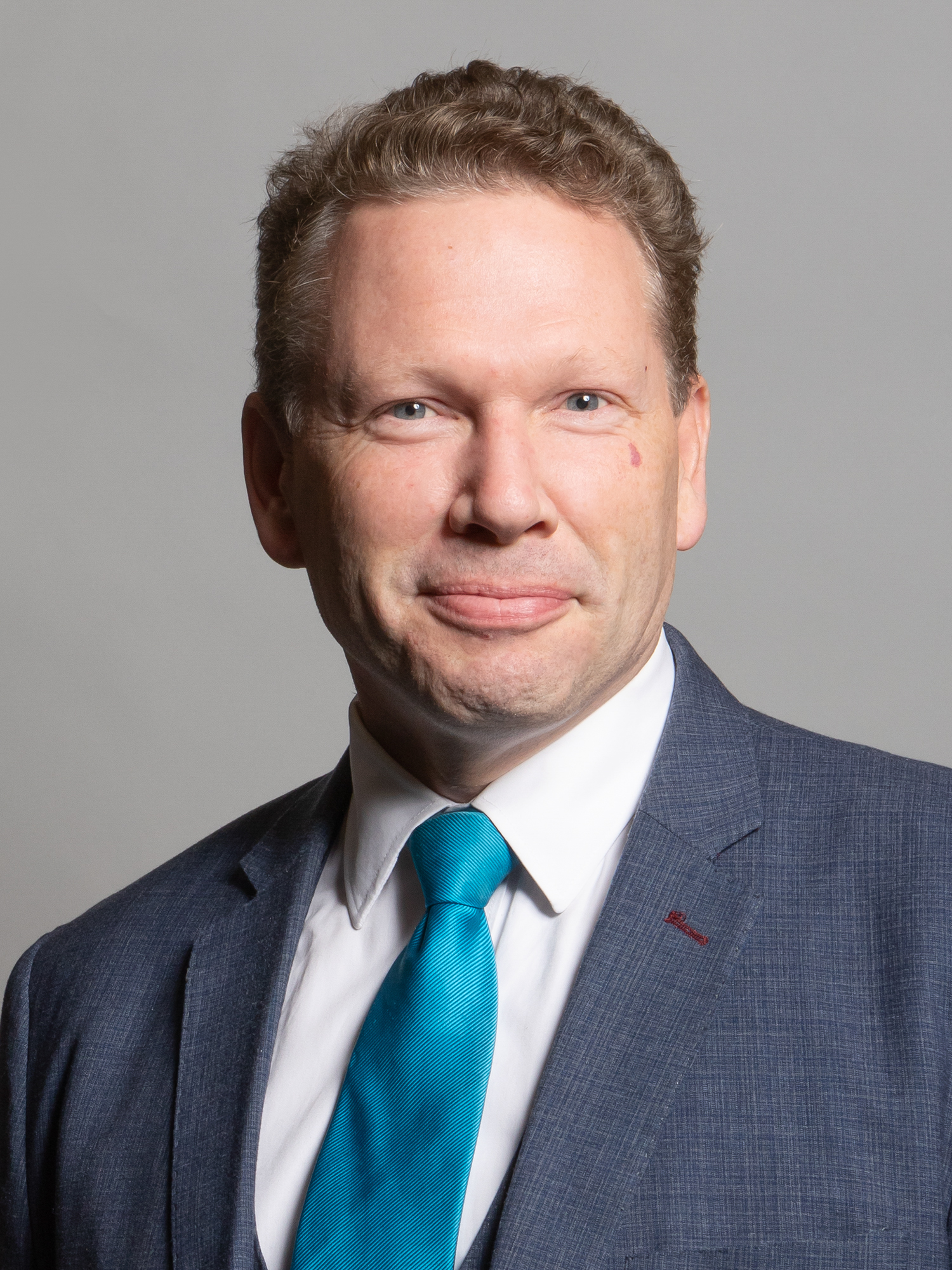
- Official portrait, 2020

Parliamentary Under-Secretary of State for Transport
- In office 8 July 2022 – 8 September 2022
- Prime Minister: Boris Johnson
- Preceded by: Trudy Harrison
- Succeeded by: Katherine Fletcher

Member of Parliament for Lincoln
- In office 12 December 2019 – 30 May 2024
- Preceded by: Karen Lee
- Succeeded by: Hamish Falconer
- In office 6 May 2010 – 3 May 2017
- Preceded by: Gillian Merron
- Succeeded by: Karen Lee

Personal details
- Born: Karl Ian McCartney; 25 October 1968 (age 57) Birkenhead, Cheshire, England
- Party: Conservative
- Spouse: Cordelia Pyne (m. 1999)
- Children: 2
- Education: St David's University College
- Website: www.karlmccartney.co.uk/

Karl Ian McCartney (Note: McCartney prefers to style his name M^{c}Cartney, with a superscript c in the Mc prefix. Accordingly, at his request, Hansard amended some of its records of his contributions.) (born 25 October 1968) is a British politician who was the Member of Parliament for Lincoln from 2010 to 2017, and again from 2019 to 2024. A member of the Conservative Party, he briefly served as a Parliamentary Under-Secretary of State for Transport from July to September 2022.

== Early life and career ==
McCartney was born St Catherine's Hospital in Birkenhead in October 1968 to parents John McCartney and Brenda McCartney (née Weir). He was privately educated at Birkenhead School from 1980 to 1986, before joining the state-sector Sixth Form at Neston County Comprehensive School. He gained two A-levels in Geography and Art in 1987.

He studied geography at St David's University College in Lampeter from 1988 to 1992. At Lampeter, he was student union president from 1991 to 1992, and captained the Welsh Universities First XI football team from 1990 to 1991. He was also a member of The 16' Club, an exclusive, male-only invitational private dining club for students at St David's. McCartney later worked in the City of London, and was an agent and researcher for Conservative Central Office from 1993 to 1996. In 1998, he completed an MBA from Kingston Business School, also becoming a magistrate. He has been a governor at various schools since 1995, and has been a justice of the peace (JP) in Dartford, followed by Maidstone and Lincoln.

== Parliamentary career ==
McCartney was elected to parliament as MP for Lincoln at the 2010 general election, ousting Labour's incumbent, Gillian Merron. He made his maiden speech on 12 July, where he set out his vision for what he wanted to achieve whilst an MP, during the debate on Corporation Tax. Following his re-election in 2019, McCartney has spoken in 110 debates (as of April 2022), with a particular interest in transport and devolution for Lincolnshire.

In 2012, McCartney was elected by Conservative MP colleagues to the Executive of the influential 1922 Committee and the Transport Select Committee and then following the 2015 general election, he was re-elected to the same positions. As a prominent Leave campaigner, he was elected by his colleagues as a member of the Exiting the European Union Select Committee (known colloquially as the "Brexit Committee") and led the successful campaign across Greater Lincolnshire during the EU referendum. He was defeated by Labour's Karen Lee at the 2017 general election.

In 2015, McCartney gained media attention for requesting that Hansard change the way his name was displayed on parliamentary documents and websites due to him wanting his name spelt with a superscript "c" opposed to a lowercase one. The Parliamentary Authorities stated that it would cost £15,000 to implement this change.

Following his return to Parliament in 2019, he was re-elected as a member of the Transport Select Committee, the 1922 Committee and spoke out consistently against Smart motorways. On 13 July 2020, local news outlet, the Lincolnite, interviewed McCartney on the tenth anniversary of his maiden speech to Parliament.

He was made parliamentary under-secretary of state at the Department for Transport on 8 July 2022 as part of the caretaker administration of outgoing Prime Minister Boris Johnson. In June 2023, he was one of six Conservative MPs to vote against censuring Johnson following the Commons Privileges Committee investigation.

He was defeated by Labour's Hamish Falconer at the 2024 general election.

=== Expenses ===
McCartney claimed a total £1,159,047.08 in parliamentary staffing and business costs (often referred to as "expenses") between 2010 and 2017 (the majority of which are parliamentary staff costs and also include travel, accommodation and office expenses) alongside his annual salary of £74,962. His staffing and business costs rose each year he was MP, until 2017 when he accumulated over £90,000 in staffing and business costs in just six months before he was voted out at the 2017 general election (this included winding up costs such as staff severance). He employed his wife as an "office manager" and paid her between £40,000 and £45,000 in 2015–16.

Total expenses claimed
Year	Total Expenses
2010/11	£112,617.88
2011/12	£125,986.92
2012/13	£142,325.51
2013/14	£159,912.97
2014/15	£164,389.14
2015/16	£176,017.37
2016/17	£185,973.03
2017/18	£91,824.26

For comparison, in 2018/19, the then Labour MP for Lincoln, Karen Lee, claimed staffing and business costs of £196,340.59.

In 2020/21, McCartney's staffing and business costs were £147,538.47.

From January to June 2020, McCartney claimed £21,600 in expenses for Anagallis Communications, a firm run by a donor who helped fund his first election campaign.

== Electoral Commission and police investigation ==
In March 2017, the Electoral Commission fined the Conservative Party £70,000 (the Labour Party and Liberal Democrats were both fined £20,000) following the 2015 United Kingdom general election party spending investigation.

During the 2015 general election coaches of activists were transported to marginal constituencies including Lincoln to campaign alongside or in close proximity to local campaigners. The inclusion in the Conservative party national return of what in the commission's view should have been reported as candidate spending meant that there was a realistic prospect that this enabled its candidates to gain a financial advantage over opponents. In consequence, more than 20 sitting Conservative MPs, including McCartney, were investigated by Lincolnshire Police over whether he breached election spending rules. Lincolnshire Police subsequently passed a file to the Crown Prosecution Service for a decision on whether McCartney and his Election agent should be prosecuted for electoral fraud in relation to the 2015 general election.

In May 2017, the CPS announced that no further action would be taken in respect of the allegations, including those against McCartney. In advance of the 2017 general election, McCartney issued a letter to all other candidates for the Lincoln seat, warning of legal action against false, misleading or defamatory statements in the wake of investigations into the party's spending.

== Judicial Conduct Investigation Office (JCIO) ==
In January 2021, the JCIO issued a formal warning to McCartney for referring to his role as a Magistrate in election material, despite having been reprimanded for this previously. This reprimand was "for allowing his judicial status to be referred to on a political leaflet in a way that gave the appearance of seeking to gain advantage, which is contrary to guidance that is intended to protect judicial independence and impartiality." In reaching their decision, the JCIO noted that McCartney had previously received a disciplinary sanction for similar behaviour and was unwilling to acknowledge the inappropriateness of his actions.

In response, McCartney publicly stated that the complaint was "politically motivated", that he had not been previously reprimanded and that he complied with relevant guidance.

== Parliamentary Commissioner for Standards Investigation ==
In July 2021, it was announced that the Parliamentary Commissioner for Standards was investigating McCartney for failing to declare an interest in a company run by his brother. Business Insider said their investigation "revealed that he had made false declarations for more than a decade about his links to a family firm." The Standards Commissioner instructed that the entry to be amended known as a rectification procedure.

== Views ==
=== Brexit ===
McCartney campaigned and voted to Leave in the 2016 United Kingdom European Union membership referendum. 56.9% of votes cast in the City of Lincoln were for Leave. During the referendum campaign, McCartney led the Greater Lincolnshire Vote Leave Grand Tour on 14 June 2016 which included visiting 14 towns across the county in one day.

=== Marriage ===
McCartney is opposed to the idea of same-sex marriage, arguing in a 2012 reply to a constituent's letter on the matter that he felt it would next lead to "multi-partnership marriages... [and] a reduction in the age of permitted marriage". Same-sex marriage was legalised in England and Wales and Scotland in 2014, and in Northern Ireland in 2020.

=== Common Sense Group ===
Following an interim report on the connections between colonialism and properties now in the care of the National Trust, including links with historic slavery, McCartney was among the signatories of a letter to The Telegraph from the "Common Sense Group" of Conservative Parliamentarians in November 2020. The letter accused the National Trust of being "coloured by cultural Marxist dogma, colloquially known as the 'woke agenda'".

=== Education ===
McCartney was a leading advocate in Parliament for tackling the educational underperformance for boys/gender education gap. In April 2012, McCartney said that publication of the results of the Department for Education's investigation into allegations of misuse of funds at Lincoln's Priory Federation of Academies Trust should be delayed until the decision was made by the then Secretary of State.

=== Transport ===
McCartney has supported transport issues at both a Lincoln and national level.

In Lincoln, this has included the creation of a Lincoln "Ring Road" (including dualled sections of the Western bypass), the creation of an Eastern bypass and the now planned North Hykeham Relief Road. In addition, McCartney has supported the creation of a Lincoln Transport Hub, the Lincoln East -West Link Road alongside additional train services from Lincoln railway station including increased direct services to London.

By late November 2014, work had commenced on the pedestrian footbridge over the level crossing on High Street with a further footbridge over the railway due to be constructed in 2015, following years of campaigning by McCartney (and his predecessor) and Lincoln City Council to Network Rail. This was completed in 2016.

It was announced in November 2014, that InterCity Railways, the new operator of the East Coast Rail Franchise, would increase the number of direct trains to London from Lincoln to six per day during their operating timeframe, thereby finally providing a service originally planned for the 2011 "Eureka" timetable, but dropped shortly after McCartney was elected in May 2010, when it was announced that the services would be cut back to just one, after DOR took over operations from National Express. After his election, McCartney had campaigned for better Lincoln to London rail links which were then increased.

On 4 December 2014, McCartney was able to confirm that the £49.5m of funding for the Eastern Bypass was secure and that the Government would support in principle a future bid for the bypass to be a dual carriageway.

Nationally, McCartney campaigned to ensure there are curbs on false whiplash car injury claims. There was later a Government consultation on the subject and new rules were implemented on 21 May 2021 by the Government. He also raised concerns about the continuation of Smart motorways.

=== Inappropriate comments ===
On 28 February 2013, McCartney apologised to the Independent Parliamentary Standards Authority (IPSA) for the content of notes he had sent to staff. The notes were described by IPSA Chief Executive, Andrew McDonald as "abusive", "offensive" and "condescending". McCartney's apology stated, "I apologise unreservedly to IPSA for my comments which were inappropriate, and which I regret having made. I accept that such comments have given cause for offence. You will not see me making similar remarks in the future in respect of IPSA, which has a difficult and important job to do." The following month, he said that IPSA's incompetence had forced MPs from all parties to borrow money and that he had had to ask his parents for financial assistance. McCartney also said that he had been told by a "senior IPSA official" that the organisation intended to "damage MPs as much as possible," a claim that IPSA said was "wild ..simply untrue."

=== Social media ===
In November 2014, McCartney complained to Twitter about its "security changes". He denied claims of "favouriting" a pornographic image on Twitter. He said he never used the "favourite" function on the social networking site.

McCartney's attitude to women was criticised after a councillor sent him a tweet comparing the 2015 election all female Labour Party shortlist in his constituency to women modelling underwear. After a hostile response, the councillor, a Conservative chairman in Margaret Thatcher's home town of Grantham deleted the remark and apologised. After criticism from Labour candidate Lucy Rigby, who noted that only 1 in 5 Conservative MPs were women, McCartney replied that those with a sense of humour would appreciate the remark, though he said the comment was addressed to another Twitter user joining the debate.

== Post Parliament ==
In September 2024, McCartney announced he had put himself forward to be the Conservative candidate for the 2025 Greater Lincolnshire mayoral election. He made it onto a six-man shortlist for the position, but missed out on the nomination which went to Rob Waltham following a selection event at Lincoln's Bishop Grosseteste University in December 2024.

== Personal life ==
In 1999, McCartney married Cordelia Pyne, a Conservative district councillor for Market Rasen. The couple have two sons. He lists his recreations as "myriad of sports—football, Rugby, cricket, croquet, snowboarding, shooting; classic cars, green laning, trains, gardens, architecture, history, dance music, relaxing with family and friends, cooking".

== Footnote ==
Parliament of the United Kingdom
Preceded by Gillian Merron	Member of Parliament for Lincoln; 2010–2017	Succeeded by Karen Lee
Preceded by Karen Lee	Member of Parliament for Lincoln; 2019–2024	Succeeded by Hamish Falconer
