= William Leadenham =

English politician

William Leadenham (fl. 1421) was an English politician.

He was a member (MP) of the parliament of England for Lincoln in December 1421.
