= Walter Liddall =

British Conservative politician (1884–1963)

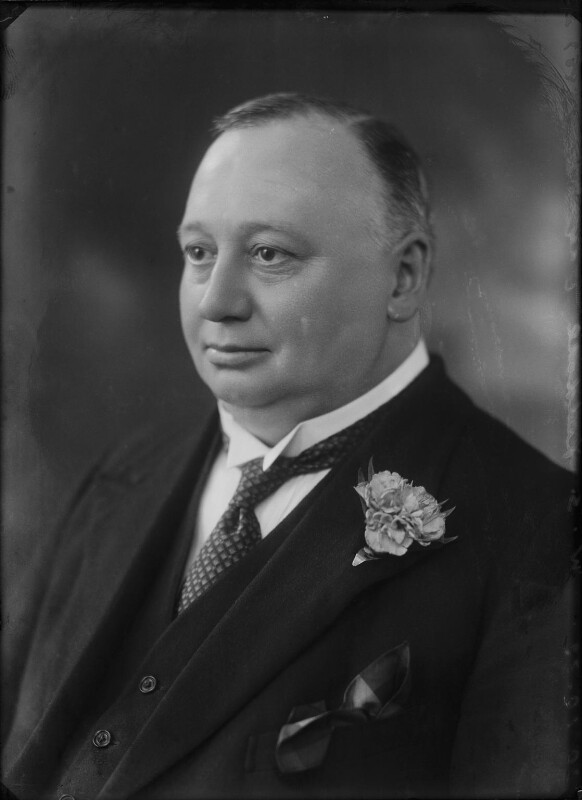
Walter Liddall

Sir Walter Sydney Liddall CBE (2 March 1884 – 24 February 1963) was the Conservative Member of Parliament (MP) for Lincoln from 1931 to 1945.

Born in Boston, Lincolnshire, he was educated at De Aston School at Market Rasen. He was a local manager for the Scunthorpe Savings Bank and eventually became the chairman.

In 1938, when Neville Chamberlain returned from Munich with his and Adolf Hitler's signature on their peace agreement most of the MPs in the house rose in "tumultuous acclamation", a few like Harold Nicolson remained seated. Liddall hissed at him, "Stand up, you brute"".

Liddall died aged 78 in Scunthorpe.

He was awarded CBE in the 1937 Coronation Honours for political and public services.

Parliament of the United Kingdom
Preceded by Robert Arthur Taylor	Member of Parliament for Lincoln; 1931 – 1945	Succeeded by George Deer
