= John Bigge (MP) =

English politician

John Bigge (fl. 1411–1421) was an English politician.

He was a member (MP) of the parliament of England for Lincoln in 1411, 1416, 1420 and 1421.

In 1421 he was appointed Recorder of Lincoln.
