= Edward Ayscough (died 1699) =

English politician

Sir Edward Ayscough

Member of Parliament for Great Grimsby
- In office 1685–1699 Serving with Sir Thomas Barnardiston, Bt, John Chaplin, Arthur Moore from 1695
- Preceded by: George Pelham; William Brodholme
- Succeeded by: Thomas Vyner; Arthur Moore

Personal details
- Born: c. November 1650
- Died: 3 October 1699 (aged 48) Grasby, Lincolnshire
- Spouses: Bridget Skinner (died 1684) Mary Harbord (m. 1685)
- Relations: Sir Edward Ayscough (grandfather)
- Parent(s): Sir Edward Ayscough; Isabel Bolles
- Education: Sidney Sussex College, Cambridge

Sir Edward Ayscough (1650 – 3 October 1699) was an English politician who sat in the House of Commons between 1685 and 1699.

== Early life ==
Ayscough was baptised on 19 November 1650. Ayscough was the son of Sir Edward Ayscough of South Kelsey and his wife Isabel Bolles. His paternal grandfather was Sir Edward Ayscough and his maternal grandfather was Sir John Bolles, 1st Baronet of Scampton (son of Sir George Bolles, Lord Mayor of London and High Sheriff of Lincolnshire in 1627).

He was educated at Melton, Lincolnshire and admitted at Sidney Sussex College, Cambridge, in 1667.

== Career ==
In 1668, he succeeded to the family estates on the death of his father. He studied further in Padua in 1671 and entered Gray's Inn in the same year. He was knighted on 17 January 1672. He was twice appointed Sheriff of Lincolnshire in 1683 and 1684.

In 1685, he was elected Member of Parliament for Great Grimsby. He was high steward of Great Grimsby from 1686 to October 1688 and commissioner for prizes from 1689 to June 1699. In 1690, he was commissioner for drowned lands.

== Personal life ==
Ayscough married firstly Bridget Skinner, daughter of Edward Skinner of Thornton College, Lincolnshire. Before her death in August 1684, they were the parents of a son and two daughters, including:

- Bridget Ayscough (1672–1741), who married John Hanbury of Pontypool, MP for Gloucester and Monmouthshire, in 1703.
- Anne Ayscough (1674–1696), who married John Digby of Mansfield Woodhouse in 1696 and died later that same year.
- Edward Ayscough (1679–1681), who died in infancy.

After his first wife's death, he married, secondly, on 1 August 1685 to Mary Harbord at Grasby. Mary was a daughter and heiress of William Harbord (son of Sir Charles Harbord, surveyor general to Charles I). Together, they were the parents of one son and seven daughters, including:

- Letitia Ayscough, who married St Andrew Thornhough of Osberton and Fenton.
- Isabella Ayscough (1691–1748), who married Matthew Boucherett, the High Sheriff of Lincolnshire in 1706. They were the grandparents of Ayscoghe Boucherett.
- Margaret Ayscough (1692–1710), who married William Frankland, FRS Treasurer of the Stamp Office, son of Sir Thomas Frankland, 2nd Baronet.
- Charles Ayscough (d. 1707).

Sir Edward died on 3 October 1699, at the age of about 49, at Grasby, Lincolnshire, and was buried at Stallingborough. His only surviving son Charles died soon after him, and the estates were shared by his daughters, to whom he had made bequests amounting to over £10,000.

Parliament of England
Preceded by George Pelham; William Brodholme	Member of Parliament for Great Grimsby; 1685–1699; With: Sir Thomas Barnardiston, Bt 1685–90; John Chaplin 1690–95; Arthur Moore from 1695	Succeeded by Thomas Vyner; Arthur Moore
