= Thomas Grantham (Parliamentarian) =

English politician

Thomas Grantham (1612–1655) was an English politician who sat in the House of Commons from 1640 to 1653. He fought on the Parliamentary side in the English Civil War.

Grantham was the son of Sir Thomas Grantham and his wife Frances Puckering. He was baptised at Goltho, Lincolnshire on 5 November 1612.

In April 1640, Grantham was elected Member of Parliament for Lincoln in the Short Parliament. He was re-elected MP for Lincoln for the Long Parliament in November 1640. He raised a regiment of foot which fought at the Battle of Aylesbury in 1642.

Grantham died in 1655 at the age of 42. He had married Dorothy Alford daughter of Sir William Alford. She had inherited Meaux Abbey, near Beverley in the East Riding of Yorkshire.

Parliament of England
Parliament suspended since 1629	Member of Parliament for Lincoln; 1640; With: John Farmery 1640; John Broxholme 1640–1647; Thomas Lister	Not represented in Barebones Parliament
