= John Biggs =

John Biggs may refer to:

- John Biggs (London politician) (born 1957), British Labour Party politician
- John B. Biggs (born 1934), Australian educational psychologist
- John H. Biggs (born 1936), American businessman, former chairman and chief executive officer of TIAA-CREF
- John Biggs Jr. (1895–1979), American judge
- John Biggs (MP) (1801–1871), British Member of Parliament for Leicester

== See also ==
- John Biggs-Davison (1918–1988), British Conservative Member of Parliament
- John Bigg (disambiguation)
- John Bigge (disambiguation)
