= Seman Laxfield =

English politician

Parliament of England

Personal details
- Born: 1397
- Died: 1404 (aged 6–7)
- Occupation: politician

Seman Laxfield or Patener (fl. 1397–1404), of Lincoln, was an English politician.

He was Mayor of Lincoln for 1389–90 and elected a Member (MP) of the Parliament of England for Lincoln in 1397 and 1404.
