= Helen de Freitas =

Helen Graham de Freitas, Lady de Freitas (née Bell; 16 August 1910 – 14 December 1998) was an American-born British public servant, and "a leading member of the American community in London".

She was born in Chicago, Illinois on 16 August 1910 and grew up in Winnetka, the eldest of four daughters of Laird Bell, an American lawyer, who was chairman of the Chicago Council on Foreign Relations. She graduated from Bryn Mawr in 1936. In 1938, she married the British politician and diplomat Sir Geoffrey de Freitas, and they have three sons, and one daughter. She died in London on 14 December 1998, aged 88.
