= Thomas Archer (MP for Lincoln) =

15th-century English politician

Thomas Archer (fl. 1415–1417), of Lincoln, was an English politician.

He was elected Mayor of Lincoln for 1416–17 and a member (MP) of the parliament of England for Lincoln in 1415 and 1417.
