= 1962 Lincoln by-election =

By-election outcomes

There was a 1962 by-election in the Lincoln constituency on 8 March 1962 following the resignation of the sitting member, Sir Geoffrey de Freitas, on 20 December 1961 to take up the appointment of High Commissioner to Ghana. The by-election was won by Dick Taverne of the Labour Party. Taverne came to wider attention after he fell out with the Labour Party in 1973, winning a second controversial by-election.

== Electoral history ==
General election 1959: Lincoln
| Party | Candidate | Votes | % | ±% |
|---|---|---|---|---|
| Labour | Geoffrey de Freitas | 23,629 | 55.1 | −1.1 |
| Conservative | Leslie Herbert Priestley | 19,240 | 44.9 | +1.1 |
| Majority | | 4,389 | 10.2 | −2.2 |
| Turnout | | 42,869 | 84.1 | −1.8 |
| Labour hold | | Swing | | |

== Candidates ==
The local Liberal Party selected 35-year-old Patrick Furnell to contest the seat. He was a lecturer and tutor in economics and the British constitution. He was educated at Godalming County Grammar School and Trinity College, Oxford (where he was Kitchener Scholar). He joined the R.A.F. in 1948, was commissioned three months later, and served at the R.A.F. station near Cardiff. His earliest political activity came while he was at Oxford University; in 1947 he was President of Oxford University Liberal Club for the Michaelmas term. He first contested Cardiff South East at the 1950 general election while only 22 years of age. In a bad election for the Liberals nationwide, he polled 8% and came third. At the 1959 general election he contested East Grinstead. On this occasion he polled 18% and came third.

== Result ==
The Labour Party held the seat with an increased majority.

1962 Lincoln by-election
| Party | Candidate | Votes | % | ±% |
|---|---|---|---|---|
| Labour | Dick Taverne | 19,038 | 50.51 | −4.59 |
| Conservative | Percy Grieve | 11,386 | 30.21 | −14.69 |
| Liberal | Patrick Arthur Thomas Furnell | 6,856 | 18.19 | New |
| Independent | Capt. A. Taylor | 412 | 1.09 | New |
| Majority | | 7,652 | 20.30 | +10.10 |
| Turnout | | 37,692 | | |
| Labour hold | | Swing | | |
