= John Dalderby (MP) =

English politician

John Dalderby (fl. 1413) was an English politician.

He was a member (MP) of the parliament of England for Lincoln May 1413.
