= Gilbert Beesby =

14th-century English politician

Gilbert Beesby (fl. 1382–1401) was an English merchant, mayor and member of parliament from Lincoln.

Beesby was Bailiff of Lincoln in September 1371 – 1372, and Mayor of Lincoln in 1380–81.

He was a Member of the Parliament of England for Lincoln in 1382, 1388 and 1401.
