= Alfred Davies (Lincoln MP) =

British politician (1881–1941)

Portrait by Walter Stoneman, 1921

Sir Alfred Thomas Davies, CBE, JP, DL (17 July 1881 – 16 November 1941) was a British Conservative politician.

Educated at the London Polytechnic, Davies joined the family business and became the chairman of its board of directors. During the First World War, his work for the Welsh Prisoners of War Fund and for the Welsh Soldiers Service Service at Westminster Abbey was rewarded with an appointment as a CBE.

He was first elected for Lincoln in 1918 with the Coalition Coupon as a supporter of the government, unseating the Liberal incumbent Charles Roberts. He was re-elected twice, with increased majorities. As MP, he undertook government missions abroad, served on several departmental committees, and was arbitrator in industrial disputes. He stood down at the 1924 general election, having been taken ill in Mesopotamia.

A municipal councillor for St. Pancras from 1913 to 1918 and mayor of St. Pancras from 1931 to 1932, Davies was a member of the London County Council from 1931 to 1937. He was knighted in 1931.
