= John Broxholme =

John Broxholme (died 1647) was an English politician who sat in the House of Commons from 1640 to 1647.

Broxholme was of Broxholme Place, Lincoln. In November 1640, he was elected Member of Parliament for Lincoln in the Long Parliament and sat until his death in 1647.

Broxholme married Troth Fowkes, widow of Sir Henry Fowkes of Bulwick, and daughter of Richard Gedney of Bag Enderby, Lincolnshire. His son William was later MP for Grimsby.

Parliament of England
Preceded by John Farmery; Thomas Grantham	Member of Parliament for Lincoln; 1640; With: Thomas Grantham	Succeeded by Thomas Lister; Thomas Grantham
