= Nick Butler =

British academic and former oil executive

Nicholas Jones Butler (born 22 November 1954) is a visiting professor at King's College London and the founding chairman of The Policy Institute at King's. He chairs Promus Associates, The Sure Chill Company. From 2007 to 2009 he was chairman of the Cambridge Centre for Energy Studies. He was a special adviser to the then British prime minister Gordon Brown from 2009 to 2010.

== Life ==
Butler was educated at Blackpool Grammar School, and graduated in economics from Trinity College, Cambridge (BA, 1977). He joined the British oil firm BP in 1977, ultimately becoming group vice president for strategy and policy development from 2002 to 2006.

He is a member of the advisory board of OMFIF – the organisation of Financial Institutions and Sovereign Wealth Funds. He served as non-executive chairman of the energy technology business Agni Inc from 2008 until February 2009.

He is a vice president of the Hay-on-Wye literary festival and a member and chairman of the executive committee of the Athenaeum.

He contributes to the Financial Times on energy and power and for the Nikkei Asian Review.

He is a vice president of the Fabian Society.

== Publications ==
- European Universities – Renaissance or Decay (with Richard Lambert, 2006)
- The International Grain Trade (1985)
- The IMF – Time for Reform (1982)

Party political offices
Preceded by Austin Mitchell	Chair of the Fabian Society; 1987–1988	Succeeded by Bryan Gould
Preceded by Brian Abel-Smith	Treasurer of the Fabian Society; 1982–2012	Succeeded by David Chaplin
