= George Anton =

16th-century English politician

George Anton (born ca. 1550) of Lincoln was an English politician and son of Thomas Anton (d.1559) of Strathfieldsaye.

He was a member (MP) of the parliament of England for Lincoln in 1589, 1593, 1597 and 1601. He had a private book collection which can be identified by the presence of his armorial stamp.
