= Nicholas Werk =

English politician

Nicholas Werk (fl. 1384–1390), of Lincoln, was an English politician.

== Family ==
Werk married Isabel, who died at some point before June 1397. They had one daughter.

== Career ==
He was a member (MP) of the parliament of England for Lincoln in April 1384 and January 1390.
