= Edward Ayscough (died 1668) =

English politician

Sir Edward Ayscough (c. 1618 – 13 August 1668) was an English politician who sat in the House of Commons from 1659 to his death.

Ayscough was born at South Kelsey, Lincolnshire, the son of Sir Edward Ayscough. He was educated at Westminster School and at Lincoln. He was admitted at Sidney Sussex College, Cambridge on 16 September 1635 at the age of 17. In 1659, he was elected Member of Parliament for Great Grimsby for the Third Protectorate Parliament. He was knighted in 1660. In 1665 he was High Sheriff of Lincolnshire.

Ayscough died in 1668 at the age of approximately 50. He was the father of Edward Ayscough who was also MP for Grimsby.

Parliament of England
Preceded by William Wray	Member of Parliament for Great Grimsby; 1659; With: William Wray	Succeeded by Not represented in Restored Rump
