= Edward Tyrwhitt =

English politician

Sir Edward Tyrwhitt (March 1577 – 4 March 1628), of Stainfield, Lincolnshire, was an English politician.

He was a member (MP) of the parliament of England for Lincoln in 1604.
