= 1701 English general election =

There were two general elections held in England in 1701:

- January 1701 English general election
- November 1701 English general election
