= Anthony Missenden =

English politician (1505–c.1542)

Anthony Missenden (by 1505 – c. 1542), of Healing, Lincolnshire, was an English politician.

He was a member (MP) of the parliament of England for Lincoln in 1539 and 1542.
