= Edward Ayscough (born 1596) =

English politician

Sir Edward Ayscough (1596 – by 1654) was an English Member of Parliament.

He was the only surviving son of William Ayscough of South Kelsey, Lincolnshire and educated at Sidney Sussex College, Cambridge (1612). He succeeded his father in 1611 and his grandfather in 1612 and was knighted in 1613.

He was a justice of the peace for Lindsey, Lincolnshire from 1618 to at least 1640 and appointed High Sheriff of Lincolnshire for 1631–32. He was elected MP for Lincoln in 1621 and 1628 and as knight of the shire (MP) for Lincolnshire in November 1640. As a devout Puritan he opposed the Forced Loan (a demand by Charles I that people "lend" him money) in 1627 and was briefly dismissed from the bench and imprisoned. He was an active supporter of the Parliament during the Civil War.

He married Frances, the daughter and heiress of Sir Nicholas Clifford of Bobbing Court, Kent, with whom he had 7 sons and 6 daughters. He was succeeded by his son Edward Ayscough, also an MP.

Parliament of England
Preceded by Edward Bash; Thomas Grantham	Member of Parliament for Lincoln; 1621–1624; With: Sir Lewis Watson, Bt	Succeeded by Sir Lewis Watson, Bt; Thomas Hatcher
Preceded by Thomas Grantham; Robert Monson	Member of Parliament for Lincoln; 1628–1629; With: Sir Thomas Grantham	Parliament suspended until 1640
Preceded by Sir John Wray, Bt; Sir Edward Hussey, Bt	Member of Parliament for Lincolnshire; Nov. 1640 – 1648; With: Sir John Wray, Bt	Not represented until 1653
