= Recorder of Lincoln =

Judge John Pini, QC was appointed honorary Recorder of Lincoln on 1 December 2015. He is a circuit judge, having been appointed Assistant Recorder and as a Recorder both in 2000. Pini was made a Queen's Counsel in 2006.

The previous recorder was Judge Sean Morris who held this position between 2010 and 2014. There have now been 21 recorders in Lincoln, Lincolnshire, the first incumbent being Lord Monson (John Monson, 3rd Baron Monson) in 1768.
