= Henry de Windsor =

English politician (fl. 1307)

Member of Parliament for Lincoln
- In office January 1307 – 1369
- Preceded by: Constituency established
- Succeeded by: John Sutton of Lincoln

Henry de Windsor (fl. 1307) was an English Member of Parliament. He represented Lincoln in 1307.
