= Frederick Kerans =

Frederick Harold Kerans (1849 – 17 April 1894) was a British barrister and politician.

Born at Hooton Levitt Hall, near Rotherham, Kerans was educated at Rugby School. He became a barrister in 1873. At the 1885 UK general election, he stood unsuccessfully for the Conservative Party in Lincoln, but he won the seat in 1886. He described himself as a "liberal Conservative". He was defeated at the 1892 UK general election, and served as a deputy lieutenant of Lincolnshire until his death, in 1894.
