= Sibthorpe (surname) =

' or Sibthrop' is a surname. Notable people with the surname include:

- A. B. C. Sibthorpe (183?–1916), African historian
- Charles Sibthorp (1783–1855), widely caricatured British Ultra-Tory politician in the early 19th century
- Fletcher Sibthorp (born 1967), British artist
- Gervaise Waldo-Sibthorp (1815–1861), Conservative Member of Parliament (MP) for Lincoln 1856–1861
- Humphry Sibthorp (1713–1797), British botanist
- Humphrey Sibthorp (1744–1815), Tory Member of Parliament (MP) for Boston 1777–1784 and Lincoln 1800–1806
- John Sibthorp (1758–1796), English botanist
- John Sibthorpe (1669–1718), English politician
- Richard Sibthorp (1792–1879), English Anglican and Roman Catholic priest and member of the Oxford Movement
- Robert Sibthorpe (died 1662), English clergyman

== Family tree ==
Sibthorp family tree

John Sibthorpe (1669–1718)
Coningsby Sibthorp (1706–1779)	Humphry Sibthorp (1713–1797)
Humphrey Sibthorp (1744–1815)	John Sibthorp (1758–1796)
Charles Sibthorp (1783–1855)
Gervaise Waldo-Sibthorp (1815–1861)
