= Humphrey Sibthorp =

Humphr(e)y Sibthorp may refer to:

- Humphry Sibthorp (botanist) (1713–1797), British botanist and educator
- Humphrey Sibthorp (1744–1815), English MP
