= Coningsby Sibthorp =

British politician

Coningsby Sibthorp DCL
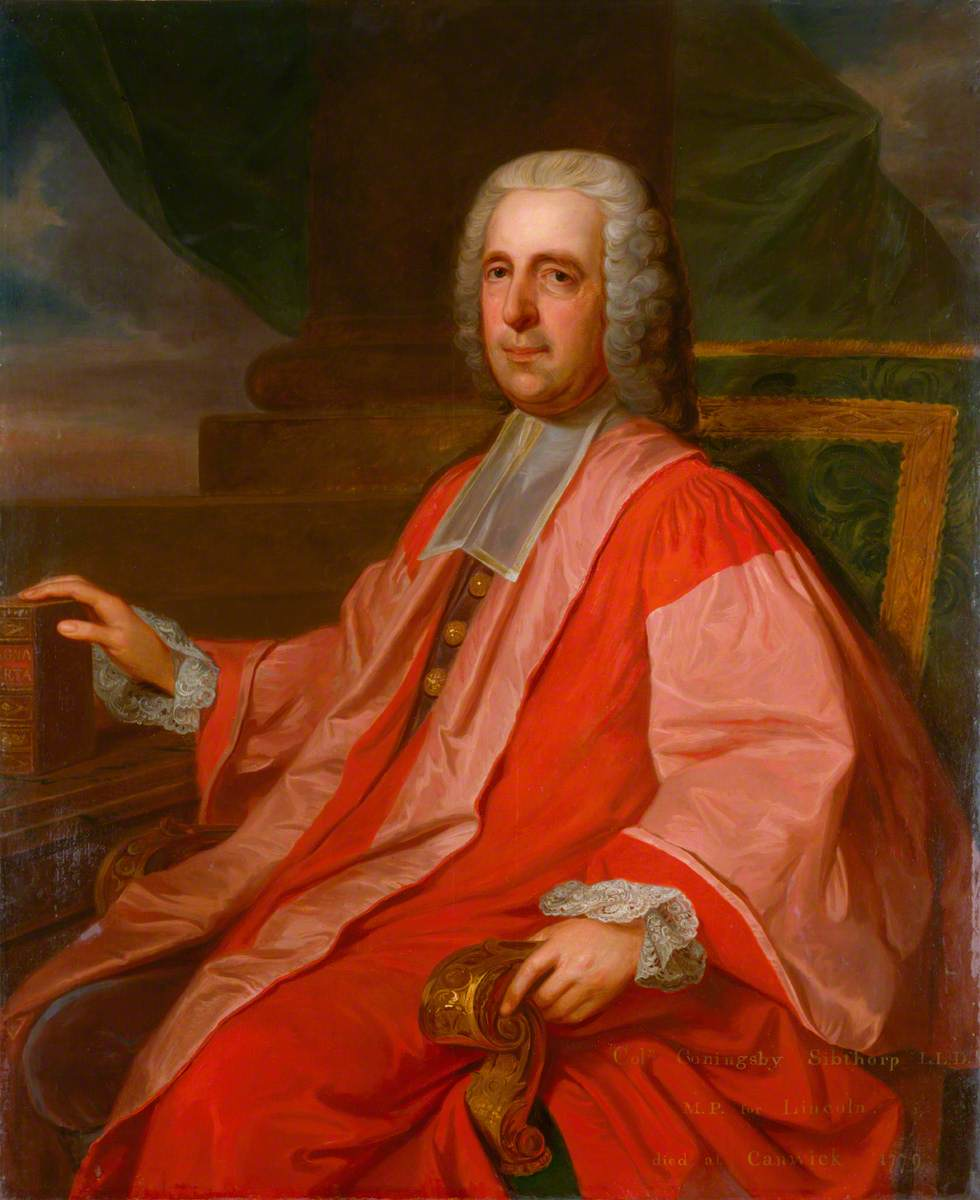
- Portrait of Sibthorp by an anonymous artist.

High Sheriff of Lincolnshire
- In office 1733–1734
- Preceded by: William D'Autrey
- Succeeded by: John Buissere

Member of Parliament for Lincoln
- In office 1734–1741
- Preceded by: Sir John Tyrwhitt
- Succeeded by: Sir John Tyrwhitt
- In office 1747–1754
- Preceded by: Sir John Tyrwhitt
- Succeeded by: John Chaplin
- In office 1761–1768
- Preceded by: John Chaplin
- Succeeded by: Constantine Phipps

Personal details
- Born: c. 1706 Castle Bytham, Lincolnshire
- Died: 20 July 1779 (aged 72–73) Canwick, Lincolnshire
- Party: Tory
- Relations: Humphry Sibthorp (brother)
- Children: 1 (illegitimate)
- Parent: John Sibthorpe
- Education: Westminster School
- Alma mater: Hart Hall, Oxford; Magdalen College, Oxford
- Occupation: Politician

Military service
- Allegiance: Great Britain
- Branch/service: Royal South Lincolnshire Militia
- Years of service: until 1779
- Rank: Colonel

Coningsby Sibthorp DCL (c. 1706 – 20 July 1779) was an English Tory politician who sat in the House of Commons for the borough seat of Lincoln variously between 1741 and 1768. Sibthorp was a member of the Sibthorp family of Canwick Hall in Lincolnshire which produced several Tory Members of Parliament between the early 18th-century and mid 19th-century, in addition to several botanists. Like the vast majority of Tory Members of Parliament during the Whig supremacy Sibthorp never held ministerial office, maintaining his political independence and Tory principles throughout his political career. On one occasion, however, Sibthorp did serve as the High Sheriff of Lincolnshire.

== Background and education ==
Sibthorp was the second son of John Sibthorpe and his wife Mary, daughter and coheiress of Humphrey Browne of Lincoln. John was the first surviving son of Gervase Sibthorp, who was the first member of the family to settle in Lincolnshire after uprooting himself from Laneham, Nottinghamshire where the family had been centred since the early 16th century. The Sibthorp family were originally yeoman farmers who were noted for their 'rigid Protestantism'. They were nouveau riche, having married into wealth that enabled them to become firstly bourgeois merchants and then gentry. Sibthorp's parents would have four sons and a daughter. Among his younger brothers was the botanist and Sherardian Professor of Botany at the University of Oxford, Humphry Sibthorp from whom subsequent generations of Sibthorp parliamentarians are descended. Sibthorp was likely named for his maternal great-grandmother, Elizabeth Coningsby who was herself a granddaughter of Sir Ralph Coningsby, an MP for Hertfordshire who served as a JP and a juryman for the trial of Sir Walter Raleigh that condemned him for complicity in the Main Plot.

Sibthorp was educated at the Westminster School in 1718 before matriculating and studying at Hart Hall, Oxford and Magdalen College, Oxford between 1724 and 1728. Sibthorp would receive an MA from Magdalen College on 31 July 1731. Sibthorp's father briefly enjoyed a political career, first appearing as a co-presenter at court of a High Tory address from Lincolnshire. After failing to be elected in 1710 he was successful as a Tory candidate in 1713. The elder Sibthorp made little impact in the Commons and did not put his name forward for re-election in 1715, though this may have been due to the pro-Whig political climate. He would die in April 1718, leaving his wife Mary as the head of the family. Sibthorp's mother exhibited financial acumen and shrewdness through which she was able to purchase an estate for the family. By 1730 she had purchased land in northern Lincolnshire culminating in the purchase of Canwick Hall and the surrounding 300 acres of land from a Catholic family, situated a mile to the south of the town of Lincoln. Sibthorp himself would inherit considerable property from his wealthy unmarried uncle in Lincolnshire and Nottinghamshire, in addition to a house in North Mymms called Skimpans.

== Electoral politics ==
The borough constituency of Lincoln after The Restoration was influenced by the local Monson and Meres gentry families. Daniel Defoe dismissed it as "an ancient, ragged, decay'd and still decaying city" that was probably not worthy of being called a city. The interest of the Sibthorps increased after the bid by Sibthorp's father and the family would represent the borough for a quarter of the eighteenth century, and for all bar twelve years from 1800 to 1861. The Monsons of Burton, who held one seat continuously from 1722 to 1768 were supportive of the Whigs. From the 1730s the constituency was seemingly influence by venal practices, though elections in the borough were competitive. The interest of the various local gentlemen were often challenged a local third-party composed of local freemen. London outvoters constituted a considerable part of the electorate and were always anxious for a contest.

As noted by Lewis Namier, much more than tradition and influence were required to carry the seat. The Whig interest enjoyed an edge in local politics until 1727 when Tory Charles Hall, a kinsman of Sibthorp, successfully contested a seat. Sibthorp would first hold public office as the High Sheriff of Lincolnshire for the year from 1733. At the 1734 general election Hall stood down for Sibthorp who invested considerable amounts of money to win the seat. Correspondence of the Banks family opined that "it must be money that gives [Sibthorp] the election". Sibthorp was victorious as one of the two candidates elected for the borough with Charles Monson, defeating the nephew of a South Sea Company director handily.

Sibthorp's interest in the seat at this stage was not as strong as it later would be. At the subsequent general election Sibthorp was defeated by the interest of the Tyrwhitt family who had aligned with the Whigs, a gain against national trends. At that election Sibthorp was defeated by over 100 votes by Tyrwhitt. Sibthorp's standing in the seat was improved when the head of the Saunderson interest in the seat of the Earl of Scarbrough who was a supporter of the Opposition Whig-Tory Leicester House opposition of Frederick, Prince of Wales and gave support to Sibthorp. Sibthorp's victory in Lincoln was certainly assisted by the support of Opposition Whigs such as Scarbrough and Sir Francis Dashwood. Sibthorp opted to not seek re-election in 1754, presumably either due to the sheer cost of election or the threat of a contest. The sheer cost and competitive nature of elections in Lincoln was alluded to by Lord Monson in a letter to the Prime Minister, the Duke of Newcastle in May 1758:

"It is not in my power any longer to support or even maintain the interest I so dearly bought at the last general election in Lincoln (by the desire of Mr. Pelham, more than my own inclination) if your Grace will not think of me; and that the spending £7,000 and upwards exclusive of my house being like a fair for two years should not have intitled (sic) me to some small favour before this, I own I think hard."

Sibthorp contested his final general election in 1761. Lord Granby was informed that "at Lincoln town, all affairs are compromised. Mr. Chaplin declines, and Lord Scarbrough brings in Mr. Sibthorp in his stead". Some opposition was mounted at the last moment by the eccentric Thomas Scrope, who stood as a candidate of "the free and independent voters" but was defeated by Sibthorp and a member of the Monson family, resulting in a riot. Scrope petitioned against Sibthorp's seating as a Member of Parliament, with allegations of electoral bribery. Supporters of Monson and Sibthorp were paid as follows: "Freemen residing in the City Three Guineas, Out'ners Four Guineas and Londoners Five Guineas". Scrope's petition was withdrawn without being heard. On Sibthorp's final retirement in 1768, Scrope topped the poll using the tactics he had decried in Sibthorp. With Sibthorp's retirement a member of the Sibthorp family would not hold the seat of Lincoln until the election of his nephew Humphrey Sibthorp in 1800.

=== Electoral record ===
General Election 1734: Lincoln
Party	Candidate	Votes	%	±%
Whig	John Monson	509	42.9	−1.0
Tory	Coningsby Sibthorp	461	38.9	+9.5
Nonpartisan	Thomas Chaplin	216	18.2	N/A
Turnout		593	N/A	N/A
Whig win				
Tory win				

General Election 1741: Lincoln
Party	Candidate	Votes	%	±%
Whig	John Monson	560	42.6	−0.3
Whig	John de la Fountain Tyrwhitt	444	33.8	N/A
Tory	Coningsby Sibthorp	311	23.7	−15.2
Turnout		658	N/A	N/A
Whig win				
Whig gain from Tory		Swing	{{{swing}}}	

General Election 1747: Lincoln
Party	Candidate	Votes	%	±%
Whig	Charles Monson	493	38.9	−3.7
Tory	Coningsby Sibthorp	418	33.0	+9.3
Nonpartisan	Robert Cracraft	357	28.2	N/A
Turnout		634	N/A	N/A
Whig win				
Tory gain from Whig		Swing	{{{swing}}}	

General Election 1761: Lincoln
Party	Candidate	Votes	%	±%
Whig	George Monson	733	46.1	+8.5
Tory	Coningsby Sibthorp	486	30.5	N/A
Nonpartisan	Thomas Scrope	373	23.4	+2.4
Turnout		796	N/A	N/A
Whig win				
Tory gain from Whig		Swing	{{{swing}}}	

== Political career ==
Sibthorp was throughout his political career a resolute Tory as was his father and subsequent politicians from the family. During his first term in office between 1734 and 1741 Sibthorp was a uniform voter against the Whig administration of Robert Walpole except on a vote to remove Walpole from office in February 1741, reflecting the unease of some Tories to remove Walpole on Whig philosophic grounds. Sibthorp is not recorded as having made a single speech in the House of Commons during his many years of service, though he does appear to have had a healthy attendance rate. After the 1761 election both the Tory and Whig parties lost their cohesion, with the over one-hundred Tory MPs gravitating either to various Whig factions or stubbornly maintaining their political principles as independents country gentlemen. Sibthorp would fall into the latter grouping, though he seems to have generally favoured conservative Whig administrations. Sibthorp was not recorded on Henry Fox's list of MPs favourable to the peace preliminaries to conclude the Seven Years' War, though within a year he was classified as a government supporter.

During the administration of Lord Rockingham, Sibthorp is recorded as having agitated Rockingham to appoint his brother Humphrey as physician to the Charterhouse, though with Sibthorp adding a caveat that "as I never asked the least favour for myself or friend during the many years I've been in Parliament". Sibthorp later received an assurance several days later, as noted by the Earl of Sandwich to the Duke of Bedford: "your Grace's concurrence will probably secure his election; and as Mr. Sibthorp requests this as a person who though a Member of Parliament never asked a favour before, I should think it will be conferring a favour on him at a very cheap rate". During the remainder of his final term in office Sibthorp voted against the repeal of the Stamp Act and opposed the government's proposed land ta in February 1767.

Due to his lack of public pronouncements, it is difficult to ascertain Sibthorp's exact political inclinations, though there are some clues from his political record. Sibthorp was invariably classified as a Tory by various political observers. In 1761 he did not receive the parliamentary whip of the Duke of Newcastle and was classified as a Tory, while in 1767 Rockingham was perhaps the closest to describing Sibthorp's political leanings when he classified the Lincoln MP as 'Tory, perhaps not ministerial'. Sibthorp's family would maintain its Tory political label longer than most, with the History of Parliament reckoning Sibthorp's nephew Humphrey was the only MP of the late eighteenth-century to avow the label of Tory. Sibthorp's Toryism can also be ascertained by his awarding of a DCL by Oxford University, noted for its 'true blue' Toryism, on 8 July 1756. Sibthorp's family were later noted for their 'rigid Protestantism', conservatism, and Tory sympathies - this appears to have been a theme throughout all family members who served as MPs during the eighteenth and nineteenth-centuries. Sibthorp, like many other Tories served in the militia, with Sibthorp holding office as a colonel in the Royal South Lincolnshire Militia until at least prior to his death.

== Personal life ==
Sibthorp was a lifelong bachelor and died 20 July 1779, leaving his estates to his nephew Humphrey. Sibthorp appears to have had a natural son whose property, failing male issue, eventually reverted back to the Sibthorp family in the 19th century. Sibthorp is known to have been an active Freemason within the Saracens Head Lodge having been a member since at least 1732 and acting as a Senior Warden on at least one occasion.

Sibthorp family tree

John Sibthorpe (1669–1718)
Coningsby Sibthorp (1706–1779)	Humphry Sibthorp (1713–1797)
Humphrey Sibthorp (1744–1815)	John Sibthorp (1758–1796)
Charles Sibthorp (1783–1855)
Gervaise Waldo-Sibthorp (1815–1861)

Parliament of Great Britain
Preceded by Charles Hall; John Tyrwhitt	Member of Parliament for Lincoln; 1734–1741; With: Charles Monson	Succeeded by Charles Monson; John Tyrwhitt
Preceded by Charles Monson; John Tyrwhitt	Member of Parliament for Lincoln; 1747–1754; With: Charles Monson	Succeeded by George Monson; John Chaplin
Preceded by George Monson; John Chaplin	Member of Parliament for Lincoln; 1761–1768; With: George Monson	Succeeded by Thomas Scrope; Constantine Phipps
