= James Anderson Scott Watson =

Scottish agriculturalist

Sir James Anderson Scott Watson CBE, FRSE (16 November 1889 – 1966) was a 20th-century Scottish agriculturalist.

== Education and early life ==
Watson was born on 16 November 1889 in Forfar, the son of William Watson a farmer at Downieken near Dundee. He studied science at the University of Edinburgh graduating with a BSc in 1908. He then went to the United States to study agriculture at the University of Iowa, gaining an MSc in 1910.

== Career and research ==
He began lecturing in agriculture at the University of Edinburgh in 1911. In the World War I he served in the Lothian and Border Horse Yeomanry for a year and was then commissioned at the rank of 2nd Lieutenant into the Royal Field Artillery where he won the Military Cross for bravery.

In 1922, he became Britain's first ever Professor of Agriculture (still at University of Edinburgh). In 1925 he transferred to be the Sibthorpian Professor of Rural Economy at the University of Oxford replacing William Somerville. He retired in 1944 and was succeeded at Oxford by Geoffrey Emett Blackman.

On 15 July 1949, he was knighted by King George VI for services to agriculture.

=== Publications ===
- The History of the Agricultural Society of England 1839-1939 (1946)
- Great Farmers (1951)
- Agriculture in the British Economy (1956)
- Agriculture: The Science and Practice of British Farming
- Evolution
- Heredity
- The Farming Year

=== Awards and honours ===
Watson was elected a Fellow of the Royal Society of Edinburgh (FRSE). His proposers were Robert Wallace, James Cossar Ewart, Sir Thomas Hudson Beare, and Robert Stewart MacDougall.
