= Richard Grantham =

English politician

Richard Grantham (1677–1723), of Goltho Hall, Lincolnshire, was an English politician who sat in the House of Commons between 1710 and 1722.

Grantham was the eldest surviving son of Vincent Grantham of Goltho Hall, Lincolnshire, and his wife Margaret Fanshaw, daughter of Sir Richard Fanshaw of Ware Park, Hertfordshire. He was educated at Eton College in 1690. He married Elizabeth and had no children.

Grantham was elected Member of Parliament for Lincoln at the 1710 general election, but was defeated in 1713. He was returned unopposed as MP for Lincoln at the 1715 general election and in 1716 was appointed Commissioner for forfeited estates following the Jacobite rebellion. He received a salary of £1,000 a year but was absent from the role for two years and in the third year was fined for non-attendance. He was defeated at the poll in the 1722 general election.

Grantham died on 28 January 1723.

Parliament of Great Britain
Preceded by Thomas Lister; Sir Thomas Meres	Member of Parliament for Lincoln; 1710–1713; With: Thomas Lister; Sir John Monson	Succeeded by Thomas Lister; John Sibthorpe
Preceded by Thomas Lister; John Sibthorpe	Member of Parliament for Lincoln; 1715–1722; With: Sir John Tyrwhitt, 5th Baronet; Sir John Monson	Succeeded by Sir John Tyrwhitt, 5th Baronet; Sir John Monson
