= Charles Seely =

Charles Seely may refer to:

- Charles Seely (politician, born 1803), British industrialist and Liberal Member of Parliament
- Sir Charles Seely, 1st Baronet (1833–1915), British Member of Parliament, son of the above
- Sir Charles Seely, 2nd Baronet (1859–1926), British Member of Parliament, son of the above
