= Richard Ellison =

Richard Ellison may refer to:

- Richard Ellison (cricketer) (born 1959), former English cricketer
- Richard Ellison (politician) (1754–1827), English Member of Parliament (MP) for Lincoln 1796–1812 and for Wootton Bassett 1813–1820
