= Thomas Lister (British politician, born 1658) =

English Tory politician

Thomas Lister (c. 1658 – 8 February 1718), of Coleby, Lincolnshire, was an English Tory politician, who sat in the English and British House of Commons from 1705 to 1715.

Lister was the eldest son of William Lister of Coleby and his wife Frances Franklyn, daughter of Sir John Franklyn MP of Willesden, Middlesex. He was admitted at Sidney Sussex College, Cambridge on 7 April 1675, aged 16 and at Gray's Inn in 1678. He married Jane Hawtrey, the daughter of John Hawtrey of Ruislip, Middlesex on 5 June 1683. In 1687, he succeeded his father, inheriting Coleby Hall, which he extended.

Lister was appointed High Sheriff of Lincolnshire for the year 1695 to 1696. From 1700 to 1705, he was Commissioner for army, navy and transport debts. He was returned as a Member of Parliament for Lincoln at the 1705 English general election on his own interest. He voted against the Court candidate as Speaker on 25 October 1705. In 1710, he opposed the impeachment of Dr Sacheverell. He had a close contest, but was returned at Lincoln at the 1710 British general election. He was listed as one of the ‘worthy patriots’ who in the first session detected the mismanagements of the previous administration and as a ‘Tory patriot’ who opposed the continuation of the war in 1711. He was also a member of the October Club. He topped the poll for Lincoln at the 1713 British general election. He did not stand at the 1715 British general election.

Lister died on 8 February 1718. By his wife he had a son, who predeceased him, and six daughters. On his death his property was shared amongst his daughters, Coleby Hall passing to his eldest daughter Mary and thence to her nephew Thomas Scrope.

Parliament of England
| Preceded by Sir Edward Hussey, Bt; Thomas Meres | Member of Parliament for Lincoln; 1705–1707; With: Thomas Meres | Succeeded by Parliament of Great Britain |
Parliament of Great Britain
| Preceded by Parliament of England | Member of Parliament for Lincoln; 1707–1715; With: Thomas Meres 1707–1710; Richard Grantham 1710–1713; John Sibthorpe 1713–1715 | Succeeded by Sir John Tyrwhitt, Bt; Richard Grantham |
