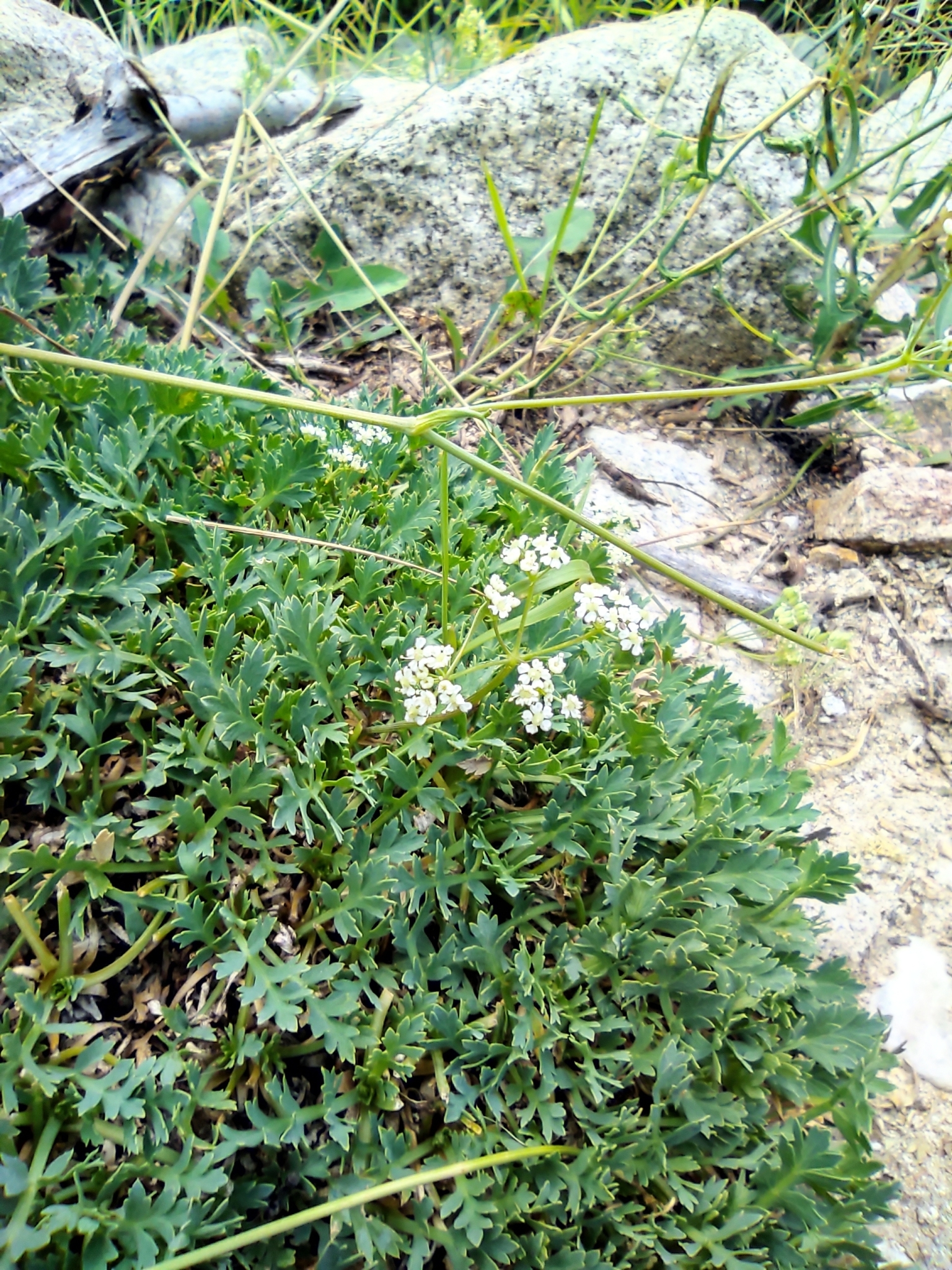

Scientific classification
- Kingdom: Plantae
- Clade: Tracheophytes
- Clade: Angiosperms
- Clade: Eudicots
- Clade: Asterids
- Order: Apiales
- Family: Apiaceae
- Subfamily: Apioideae
- Tribe: Careae
- Genus: Aegokeras; Raf.
- Species: A. caespitosa

Binomial name
- Aegokeras caespitosa (Sibth. & Sm.) Raf.

Synonyms
- Olymposciadium H.Wolff; Olymposciadium caespitosum (Sm.) H.Wolff

= Aegokeras =

Genus of flowering plants

Aegokeras caespitosa is a species of flowering plants of the family Apiaceae and the only species of genus Aegokeras. It is endemic to Turkey.
