= Edward Chaplin =

Edward Chaplin may refer to:

- Edward Chaplin (politician) (1842–1883), MP for Lincoln
- Edward Chaplin (diplomat) (born 1951), British diplomat, Ambassador to Italy
