= Thomas Scrope =

Thomas Scrope may refer to:

- Thomas Scrope, 5th Baron Scrope of Masham (1429–1475)
- Thomas Scrope, 10th Baron Scrope of Bolton (1567–1609)
- Thomas Scrope (1723–1792), Member of Parliament (MP) for Lincoln 1768–1774
- Thomas Scrope (d. 1491/2), or (de) Bradley, English bishop; Bishop of Dromore and Assistant Bishop of Norwich
