= John Hinde Palmer =

English barrister and Liberal politician

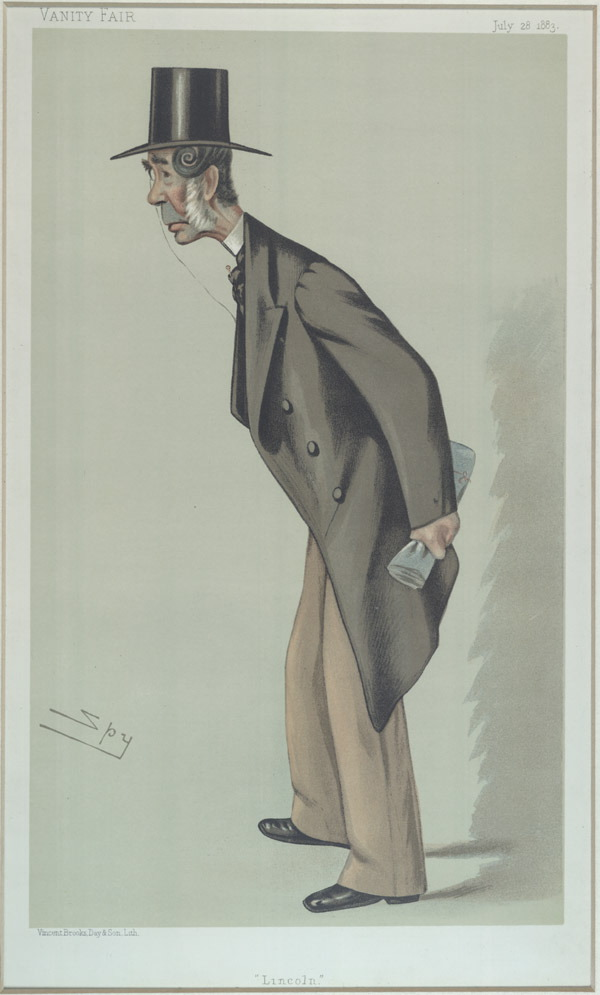
"Lincoln". Caricature by "Spy" (Leslie Ward) published in Vanity Fair in 1883.

John Hinde Palmer (1808 – 2 June 1884) was an English barrister and Liberal Party politician who sat in the House of Commons in two periods between 1868 and 1884.

== Early life ==
Palmer was the son of Samuel Palmer of Dulwich Common and his wife Mary Hinde, daughter of L. Hinde.

== Career ==
He was called to the bar at Lincoln's Inn in 1832 and became Queen's Counsel in 1859. He was a J.P. and Deputy Lieutenant of Surrey and Bencher and treasurer of Lincoln's Inn.

Palmer stood for parliament unsuccessfully at Lincoln in the 1857 and 1859 general elections and in a by-election in 1862. At the 1868 general election he was elected as a Member of Parliament (MP) for Lincoln, but lost the seat in 1874. He was re-elected in 1880 and held the seat until his death at the age of 75 in 1884.

== Personal life ==
Palmer married Clara Maria Tennyson-d'Eyncourt, daughter of Charles Tennyson-d'Eyncourt of Bayons Manor in Lincolnshire. He died at St George's Square, London, on 2 June 1884 and was buried at West Norwood Cemetery.

Parliament of the United Kingdom
Preceded by Edward Heneage; Charles Seely	Member of Parliament for Lincoln; 1868–1874; With: Charles Seely	Succeeded by Edward Chaplin; Charles Seely
Preceded by Edward Chaplin; Charles Seely	Member of Parliament for Lincoln; 1880–1884; With: Charles Seely	Succeeded by Joseph Ruston; Charles Seely
