= Daphne Osborne =

British botanist (1930–2006)

- Daphne J. Osborne
- Born: 7 March 1930; India
- Died: 16 June 2006 (aged 76); Oxford
- Citizenship: British
- Education: King's College, University of London, UK; Wye College, University of London, UK
- Known for: plant hormones, especially ethylene
- Scientific career
- Fields: plant physiology
- Workplaces: Agricultural Research Council, UK; California Institute of Technology, USA; The Open University, UK; Somerville College, Oxford
- Thesis: Studies on Plant Growth Regulators (1950)
- Doctoral advisor: R Louis Wain

Daphne J. Osborne (7 March 1930 – 16 June 2006) was a British botanist. Her research in the field of plant physiology spanned five decades and resulted in over two hundred papers, twenty of which were published in Nature. Her obituary in The Times described her scientific achievements as "legendary"; that from the Botanical Society of America attributed her success to "her wonderful intellectual style, combined with her proclivity for remarkable and perceptive experimental findings".

Her research focused on plant hormones, seed biology and plant DNA repair. She is best known for her work on the gas ethylene, in particular for demonstrating that ethylene is a natural plant hormone, and that it is the major regulator of ageing and the shedding of leaves and fruits. She also originated the concept of the target cell as a model for understanding plant hormone action.

== Education and career ==
Born in India, where her father was a colonial administrator, Osborne attended The Perse School in Cambridge. Her BSc in chemistry and MSc in botany were from King's College London. Her PhD on the topic of plant growth regulators was from the University of London at Wye College, Kent, where her supervisor was Ralph Louis Wain. Her first postgraduate position was in the Department of Biology of the California Institute of Technology, USA, as a Fulbright Scholar, where she worked with botanist Frits Warmolt Went, among others.

Much of Osborne's career was spent at the Agricultural Research Council (ARC), later renamed the Agricultural and Food Research Council (AFRC). In 1952, she joined the ARC Unit of Experimental Agronomy at Oxford University, where she worked until the unit's closure in 1970. She then took up the position of deputy director at the new ARC Unit of Developmental Botany at the University of Cambridge. During her time in Cambridge, she became the first female fellow of Churchill College and also supervised the college's first female PhD student. After the unit's closure in 1978, she joined the AFRC Weed Research Organization at Begbroke just outside Oxford, where she worked until its closure in 1985, attaining the position of deputy chief scientific officer, a senior position in the British Civil Service.

In 1985, Osborne retired from the Civil Service, and became a visiting professor at the Department of Plant Sciences of Oxford University, as well as an honorary research fellow of the Open University and of Somerville College, Oxford. In 1991, she moved to the Oxford Research Unit of the Open University at Foxcombe Hall, Boars Hill, where she remained until her death in 2006. During her time at the Open University, she headed international research projects of the Royal Society, and also attracted funding from Unilever, the Wellcome Trust and the Biotechnology and Biological Sciences Research Council.

Osborne travelled widely during her career, holding short-term positions at Princeton and the California Institute of Technology in the US, and visiting Argentina, Australia, India, Israel, Malaysia, Nigeria and South Africa. She also formed many international collaborations, latterly with scientists in China and Ukraine. In 1988, she organised a successful international NATO workshop in Turin, Italy.

Ethylene, an important plant hormone

== Research ==
The hormonal control of growth, differentiation and development in plants was Osborne's lifelong interest. She is particularly known for her work establishing that the gas ethylene is a natural plant hormone, rather than a by-product or pollutant, and for demonstrating that ethylene, rather than abscisic acid, is the major regulator of senescence (ageing) and abscission (shedding of parts such as leaves). She conducted extensive research into interactions between ethylene and auxin (another key plant hormone) in controlling numerous aspects of plant development. This work led her to develop the idea of the target cell as a model for how a small number of plant hormones can exert many different effects, a concept she expounded in her 2005 book, Hormones, Signals and Target Cells in Plant Development (co-authored with Michael McManus).

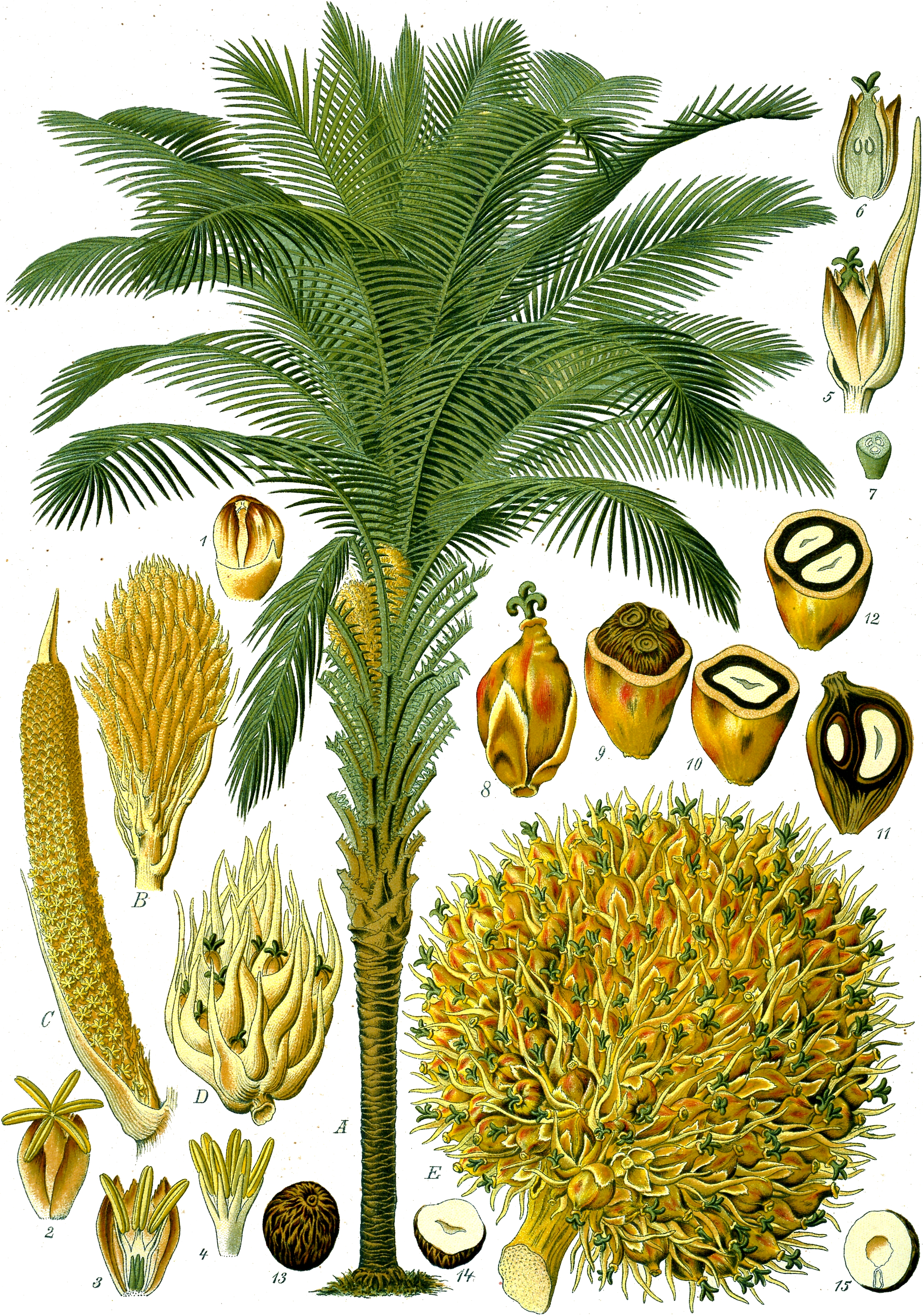
African oil palm

Another major focus of Osborne's research was seed biology. An expert on seed ageing and plant DNA repair, Osborne researched the effects of DNA degradation, repair and telomere length on the viability of seeds. In the 1970s, she was among the earliest to attempt to isolate nucleic acids from ancient seeds, finding that only very short fragments could be isolated from grains from Egyptian tombs. Among her final research projects was a study of the effects on DNA repair in seeds and pollen of exposure to radioactive fallout after the Chernobyl nuclear reactor explosion.

Osborne studied a huge diversity of plant species, from the aquatic liverwort to the commercially important African oil palm. Other topics of research within plant science included auxin herbicides; dormancy in potato tubers; growth regulation in aquatic and semi-aquatic plants; linking plant ultrastructure with physiology and biochemistry; and protein and RNA synthesis in plants. She was active in the field of space biology, designing a project for Spacelab studying the role of gravity on development in grass, and serving on the Royal Society British National Committee on Space Research for a decade.

She also worked on the effects of plant hormones on insects, showing that sexual maturity in desert locusts is regulated by gibberellins, so that eating withered vegetation low in gibberellins might prevent the insects becoming sexually mature during the dry season.

== Awards and honours ==
Osborne was awarded an honorary professorship at the Taras Shevchenko National University of Kyiv in Ukraine in recognition of her research on the Chernobyl disaster, as well as an honorary research fellowship from Somerville College, Oxford. She received honorary doctorates from the UK's Open University and from the University of Natal, South Africa. She was awarded the Sircar Memorial Gold Medal for Research in Physiology of the University of Calcutta in 1983. She was elected a corresponding member of the Botanical Society of America in 1996. In January 2008, a commemorative issue of the journal Annals of Botany was published in her honour.

== Key works ==
=== Books ===
- Osborne DJ, McManus MT. Hormones, Signals and Target Cells in Plant Development (Developmental and Cell Biology Series no. 41) (Cambridge University Press; 2005) (ISBN 0-521-33076-9)

=== Research papers ===
- Boubriak II, et al. (2008) Adaptation and impairment of DNA repair function in pollen of Betula verrucosa and seeds of Oenothera biennis from differently radionuclide-contaminated sites of Chernobyl. Annals of Botany 101: 267–276 (pdf)
- Osborne, D. J. (1984). "Concepts of target cells in plant differentiation". Cell Differentiation. 14 (3): 161–169. doi:10.1016/0045-6039(84)90042-3. PMID 6488320.
- Cheah KSE, Osborne DJ. (1978) DNA lesions occur with loss of viability in embryos of aging rye seed. Nature 272: 593–599 (abstract)
- Osborne DJ, Wright M. (1978) Gravity induced cell elongation. Proceedings of the Royal Society of London B 199: 551–564
- Knee M, Sargent JA, Osborne DJ. (1977) Cell wall metabolism in developing strawberry fruits. Journal of Experimental Botany 28: 377–396 (abstract)
- Osborne DJ, Jackson MB, Milborrow BV. (1972) Physiological properties of an abscission accelerator from senescent leaves. Nature New Biology 240: 98–101
- Jackson MB, Osborne DJ. (1970) Ethylene, the natural regulator of leaf abscission. Nature 225: 1019–1022 (abstract)
- Ridge I, Osborne DJ. (1970) Hydroxyproline and peroxidases in cell walls of Pisum sativum: regulation by ethylene. Journal of Experimental Botany 21: 843–856 (abstract)
- Horton RF, Osborne DJ. (1967) Senescence, abscission and cellulase activity in Phaseolus vulgaris. Nature 214: 1086–1088 (abstract)
- Ellis PE, Carlisle DB, Osborne DJ. (1965) Desert locusts: sexual maturation delayed by feeding on senescent vegetation. Science 149: 546–547 (abstract (with link to pdf))
- Fletcher RA, Osborne DJ. (1965) Regulation of protein and nucleic acid synthesis by gibberellin during leaf senescence. Nature 207: 1176–1177
- Osborne DJ, Hallaway HM. (1964) The auxin, 2-4-dichlorophenoxyacetic acid as a regulator of protein synthesis and senescence in detached leaves of Prunus. New Phytologist 63: 334–347
- Osborne DJ. (1962) Effect of kinetin on protein & nucleic acid metabolism in Xanthium leaves during senescence. Plant Physiology 37: 595–602
- Osborne DJ. (1955) Acceleration of abscission by factors in senescent leaves. Nature 176: 1161–1163

== Personal life ==
From 1959 until 1961 she was married to the botanist and lichenologist David Cecil Smith. This ended in divorce.
