= John Harrison Burnett =

British botanist and mycologist

- Born: 21 January 1922; Ripon, Yorskire
- Died: 22 July 2007 (aged 85); Oxford
- Education: Kingswood School; University of Oxford (BSc, PhD)
- Spouse: Margaret Bishop
- Children: 2
- Awards: Knighted 1987
- Scientific career
- Workplaces: University of Oxford; University of Liverpool; University of St. Andrews; King's College, Newcastle; University of Newcastle; University of Glasgow; University of Oxford

Sir John Harrison Burnett (21 January 1922 – 22 July 2007) was a British botanist and mycologist, who served as the principal and vice chancellor of Edinburgh University from 1979 to 1987.

== Early life and education ==
Burnett was born in Ripon, Yorkshire, the son of Rev. T. Harrison Burnett of Paisley Abbey. He was educated at Kingswood School in Bath before going up to Merton College, Oxford to read botany in 1940.

His studies were interrupted by the Second World War and from 1942 he served as a lieutenant in the Royal Navy Volunteer Reserve (RNVR). He served protecting the Atlantic convoys and in the Mediterranean during the Siege of Malta. He was mentioned in dispatches. He later served as a Royal Marine commando. In Yugoslavia, he spent time with Marshall Tito in a cave.

He resumed his studies in 1946 and graduated with a first class BSc in botany in 1947. He was awarded the Christopher Welch Research Scholarship and began doctoral research on fungi. He also began teaching at Lincoln College, became a Fellow by Examination at Magdalen College and was appointed to a university lectureship at the botany department. His doctorate (PhD) was finally awarded in 1953.

== Career ==
While studying for his doctorate, he began teaching at Lincoln College, became a Fellow by Examination at Magdalen College and was appointed to a University Lectureship at the botany department. He began lecturing at Liverpool University in 1954. In 1955 he became Professor of Botany at St Andrews University and served as dean of the Science Faculty 1958 to 1960. From 1961 to 1968 he was professor at the University of Newcastle-upon-Tyne, becoming dean of science in 1963. From 1968 to 1970 Regius Professor of Botany at the University of Glasgow and in 1970 returned to the University of Oxford as Sibthorpian Professor of Rural Economy in the Department of Agriculture and Fellow of St John's College, Oxford. While at Oxford he was a member of the Hebdomadal Council, the university's chief administrative body, from 1974 to 1979. In 1980, he became principal and vice chancellor of the University of Edinburgh, retiring in 1987.

He was elected as a Fellow of the Royal Society of Edinburgh in 1957.

He was president of the British Mycological Society 1982–83.

Margaret Thatcher called him her "favourite dissident scientist" and knighted him in 1987.

He was a member of the Nature Conservancy Council (1987–1989) serving as deputy chairman and acting chairman, and was instrumental in creating a Joint Nature Conservation Committee – to advise the newly established Country Agencies.

He was executive secretary of the World Council for the Biosphere (1987–93). He founded and chaired the International Organisation for Plant Information (1991–1996).

He was chairman, and an active leader of the newly formed Co-ordinating Commission for Biological Recording (1989–2003). From 2000 to 2005 he ran the National Biodiversity Network, which he had helped to found.

He was awarded honorary degrees by the Universities of Glasgow, Dundee, Strathclyde, Edinburgh, Buckingham and Pennsylvania (US) as well as honorary Fellowships at Green and Merton Colleges, University of Oxford. He was an honorary Fellow of the Royal College of Surgeons, Edinburgh, Fellow of the Institute of Biology and an honorary research professor at the Open University.

He undertook research of fundamental importance on the structure of fungi and on their population genetics and later in his career became a leader in plant conservation.

== Publications ==
He was involved with 10 books, including:

- The Vegetation of Scotland (1964)
- Fundamentals of Mycology (1968) and subsequent editions to 3rd in 1994.
- Mycogenetics (1975)
- The Maintenance of the Biosphere (1989) ISBN 0748601422 OL 4164995W
- Surviving with the Biosphere (1993) ISBN 0-7486-0314-X
- Biological Recording in the UK: present practice and future developments (1996)
  - Volume 1 Report, 145 pp. Summary Report, 27 pp.
- Fungal Populations and Species (2003) ISBN 9780198515531

== Personal life ==
In 1945 he married Margaret Bishop. They had two sons. He died on 22 July 2007.

Preceded by Hugh Robson	Principal of Edinburgh University; 1979–1987	Succeeded by Sir David Smith
