= Edward Heneage, 1st Baron Heneage =

British politician (1840–1922)

The Right Honourable The Lord Heneage PC, DL, JP
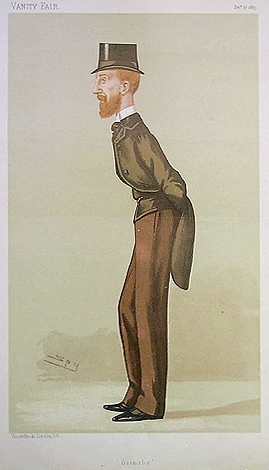
- "Grimsby"; Heneage as caricatured by "Spy" (Leslie Ward) in Vanity Fair, December 1887

Chancellor of the Duchy of Lancaster
- In office 6 February 1886 – 16 April 1886
- Monarch: Victoria
- Prime Minister: William Ewart Gladstone
- Preceded by: Henry Chaplin
- Succeeded by: Sir Ughtred Kay-Shuttleworth, Bt

Personal details
- Born: 29 March 1840
- Died: 10 August 1922 (aged 82)
- Party: Liberal; Liberal Unionist
- Spouse: Lady Eleanor Hare (died 1924)

Edward Heneage, 1st Baron Heneage, PC, DL, JP (29 March 1840 – 10 August 1922), was a British Liberal and Liberal Unionist politician. He was briefly Chancellor of the Duchy of Lancaster under William Ewart Gladstone between February and April 1886, when he broke with Gladstone over Irish Home Rule and joined the Liberal Unionists.

== Background and education ==
Heneage was the eldest son of George Heneage, of Hainton Hall in Hainton, Lincolnshire, and Frances (née Tasburgh), daughter of Michael Tasburgh. He was educated at Eton and served with the 1st Life Guards from 1857 to 1863.

== Political career ==
Heneage was elected Member of Parliament for Lincoln in 1865, a seat he held until 1868. He remained out of parliament until 1880, when he was returned for Grimsby. When the Liberals came to power under William Ewart Gladstone in February 1886, Heneage was appointed Chancellor of the Duchy of Lancaster and vice-president of the Committee of Agriculture and sworn of the Privy Council. However, he resigned these offices in April after disagreeing with Gladstone over Irish Home Rule. He joined the Liberal Unionist Party the same year.

Heneage lost his Grimsby seat at the 1892 general election, but was successfully returned for the same constituency in a by-election the following year. He was Chairman of the Liberal Unionist Council from 1893 to 1898. In June 1896 he was elevated to the peerage as Baron Heneage, of Hainton in the County of Lincoln. He was a regular contributor in the House of Lords, making his last speech in June 1920 at the age of 80.

Apart from his political career Heneage served as vice-chairman of Lindsey Quarter Sessions and as High Steward of Grimsby. In 1881 he made a gift of land to the people of Grimsby which became People's Park. A plaque in the Park commemorates this gift.

== Family ==
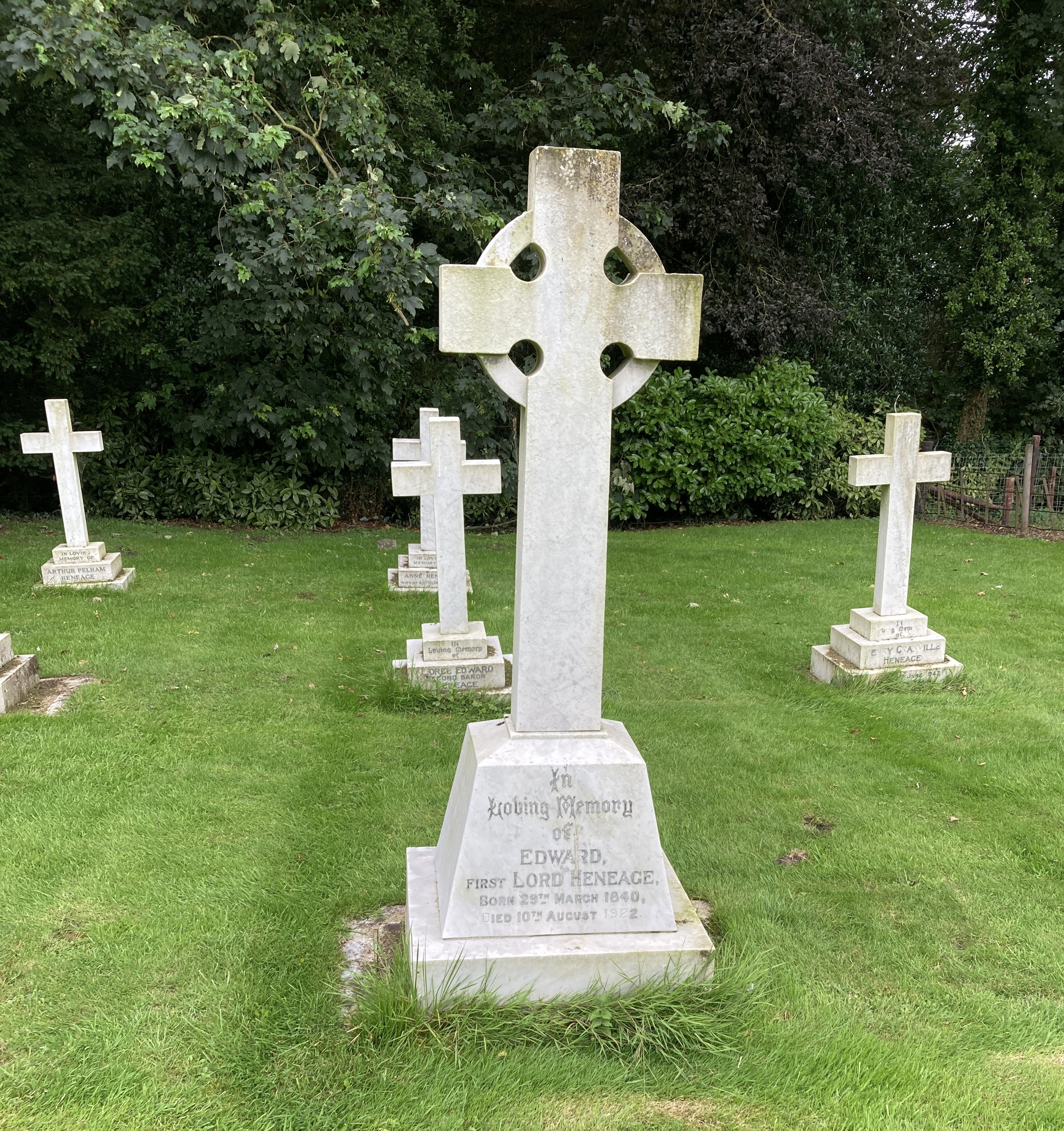
Grave of Edward Heneage in the churchyard of St Mary’s church in Hainton

Lord Heneage married Lady Eleanor Cecilia Hare, daughter of William Hare, 2nd Earl of Listowel, in 1864, the same year he succeeded to his family estates. They had three sons and six daughters. Two of their sons went on to inherit the Baron Heneage title.

He died in August 1922, aged 82, and was succeeded in the barony by his eldest son, George. Lady Heneage survived him by two years and died in September 1924.

Parliament of the United Kingdom
Preceded by Charles Seely; John Bramley-Moore	Member of Parliament for Lincoln; 1865–1868; With: Charles Seely	Succeeded by Charles Seely; John Hinde Palmer
Preceded by Alfred Watkin	Member of Parliament for Great Grimsby; 1880–1892	Succeeded by Henri Josse
Preceded by Henri Josse	Member of Parliament for Great Grimsby; 1893–1895	Succeeded by George Doughty
Political offices
Preceded by Henry Chaplin	Chancellor of the Duchy of Lancaster; 1886	Succeeded by Sir Ughtred Kay-Shuttleworth, Bt
Peerage of the United Kingdom
New creation	Baron Heneage; 1896–1922	Succeeded by George Heneage
