= William Rickford Collett =

British politician

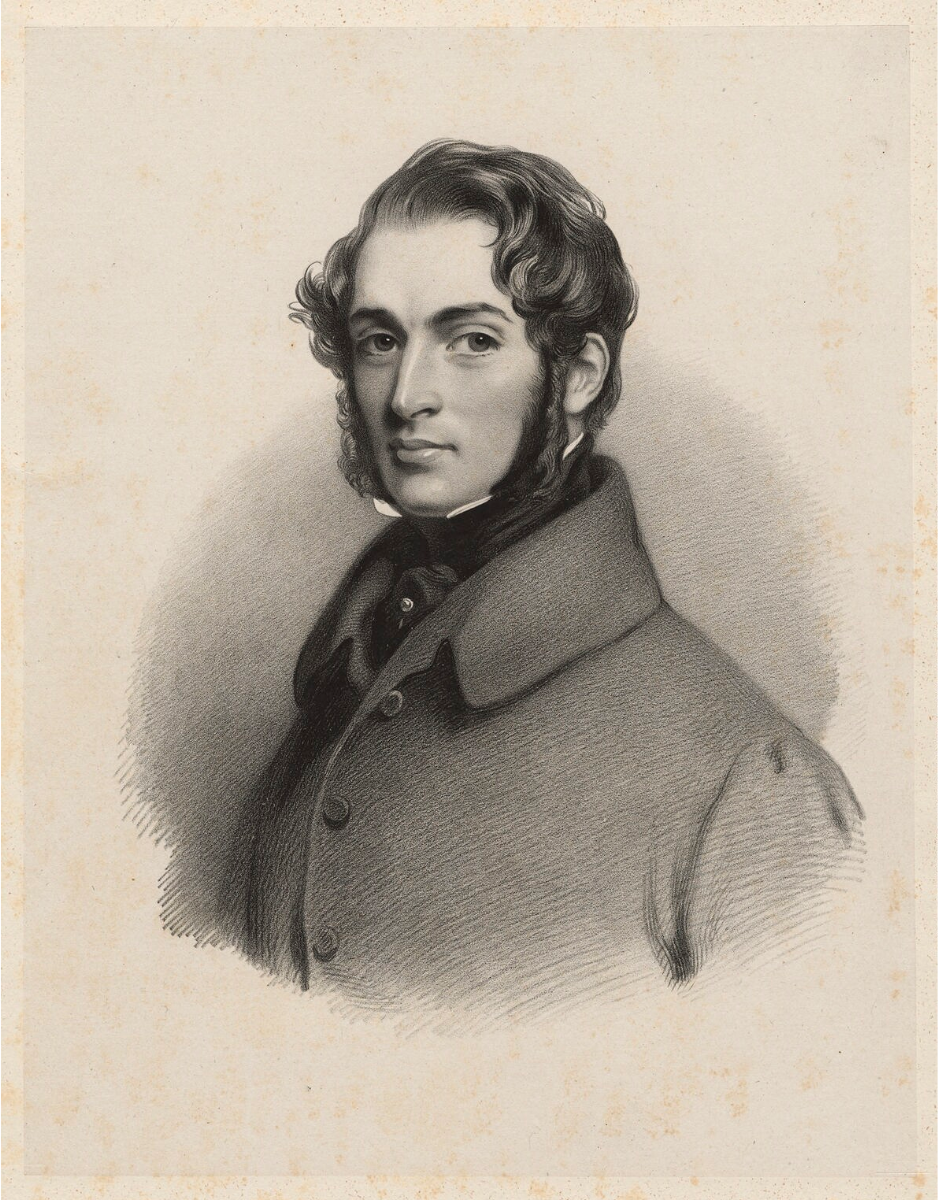
- 1842 portrait by Richard James Lane

Member of Parliament for Lincoln
- In office 30 June 1841 – 29 July 1847 Serving with Charles Sibthorp
- Preceded by: Charles Sibthorp; Edward Bulwer-Lytton
- Succeeded by: Charles Sibthorp; Charles Seely

Personal details
- Born: 1810
- Died: 1882 (aged 71–72)
- Party: Conservative

William Rickford Collett (1810–1882) was a British mine owner and Conservative politician. Collett was elected Conservative Member of Parliament for Lincoln at the 1841 general election and held the seat until 1847 when he stood for election but was defeated.

== Biography ==
Collett was born in Hemel Hempstead, Hertfordshire, in 1810. In the 1837 United Kingdom general election, he unsuccessfully ran as a candidate for Boston in Lincolnshire. Between 1841 and 1847, he served as the Member of Parliament for Lincoln.

In the late 1840s or early 1850s, Collett moved to New South Wales, becoming a director of the Australian Mutual Mining Association. In 1854, he was appointed the Commissioner for Roads for the colony, undertaking surveying work on the Northern Road between Morpeth and Murrurundi. In March 1864, Collett moved to New Zealand, becoming the Chief Superintendent of Roads and Bridges. In this role, he facilitated the construction of rail south of Pōkeno, connecting the Mangatāwhiri River south to Meremere, and preparing the initial designs of the Panmure Bridge in Auckland.

Collett was declared insolvent due to financial difficulties in 1866, due to the foreclosure of a gold mining venture at Denison Town, New South Wales which he had financed. He returned to the British Isles, contesting a seat for the Conservative Party for the 1869 County Tipperary by-election, however was unsuccessful, receiving only 12 votes.

Collett died in 1882, and was buried at Deans Grange Cemetery in Dublin.

Parliament of the United Kingdom
Preceded by Charles Sibthorp; Edward Bulwer-Lytton	Member of Parliament for Lincoln; 1841–1847; With: Charles Sibthorp	Succeeded by Charles Sibthorp; Charles Seely
