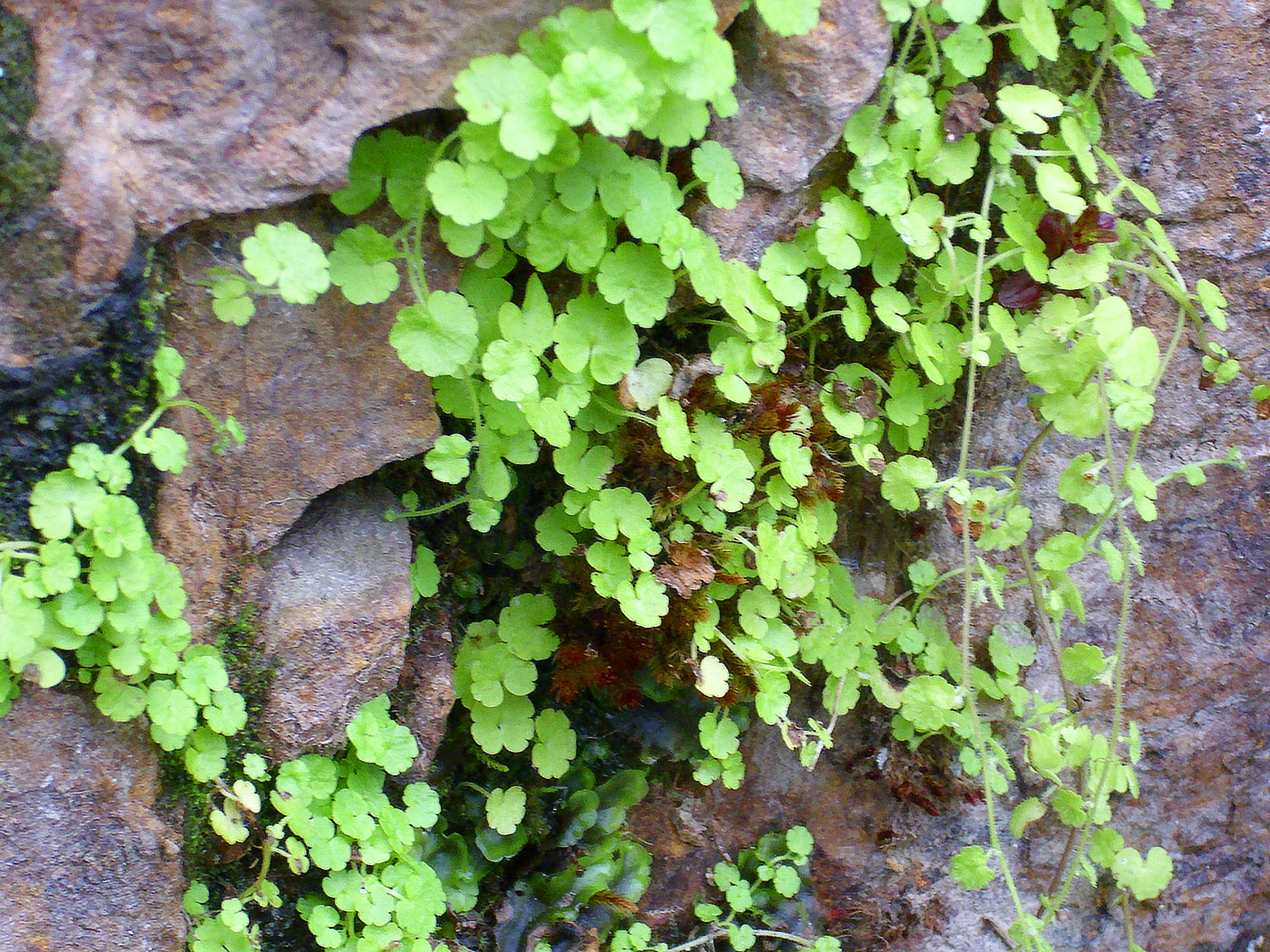

Scientific classification
- Kingdom: Plantae
- Clade: Tracheophytes
- Clade: Angiosperms
- Clade: Eudicots
- Clade: Asterids
- Order: Lamiales
- Family: Plantaginaceae
- Genus: Sibthorpia
- Species: S. europaea

Binomial name
- Sibthorpia europaea L.

= Sibthorpia europaea =

Species of flowering plant

Sibthorpia europaea is a species of flowering plant known by the common name Cornish moneywort. It can be found as a disjunct distribution in Western Europe from the Azores, Portugal and Spain to south-western Ireland and south-western United Kingdom. It also occurs in Crete, Pelion, Greece and tropical Africa. It is a prostrate perennial plant that is found in moist habitats.

== Taxonomy ==
The genus Sibthorpia is named after Dr Humphry Sibthorp who was the Sherardian Professor of Botany at the University of Oxford from 1747 to 1783.

== Description ==
Sibthorpia europaea is a small prostrate plant forming mats of thread-like stems which root as they creep across the ground. The mid-green hairy leaves are kidney-shaped and deeply notched. The flowers are tiny and develop singly in the leaf axils. They have relatively long stalks and five pinkish corolla-lobes, and appear from June onwards.

== Distribution and habitat ==
Sibthorpia europaea has a discontinuous distribution in Western Europe and tropical Africa. It is known from County Kerry in southwestern Ireland, South Wales, Devon and Cornwall, East Sussex, Spain, Portugal, the Azores, Crete, Pelion (Greece) and tropical Africa. It may be that this unusual distribution represents remnants of a species that was more widespread in the Tertiary period. It typically inhabits moist, shady locations such as stream-banks, the sides of ditches, woodland, wet heathland, shady path verges, lawns and old walls and banks with a thin covering of soil. In Ireland it grows at altitudes up to 515 m (1,690 ft) but populations seem to be dwindling as it faces competition from the more aggressive New Zealand willowherb.
