= John Monson, 1st Baron Monson =

British politician

The Right Honourable The Lord Monson PC

Member of Parliament for Lincoln
- In office 1727–1728
- Preceded by: Sir John Tyrwhitt, Bt
- Succeeded by: Charles Hall

Personal details
- Born: 1693
- Died: 29 July 1748
- Spouse: Margaret Watson
- Education: Christ Church, Oxford,

John Monson, 1st Baron Monson PC (c. 1693 – 18 July 1748), known as Sir John Monson, 5th Baronet, from 1727 to 1728, was a British politician.

== Life ==
He was the son of George Monson of Broxbourne, Hertfordshire, and Anne, daughter of Charles Wren of the Isle of Ely. He matriculated from Christ Church, Oxford, on 26 January 1708. On 4 April 1722, he was returned to the House of Commons for the city of Lincoln, and was re-elected on 30 August 1727.

He was appointed a knight of the Bath on 17 June 1725, when that order was reconstituted by George I. He succeeded in the family baronetcy, in March 1727, on the death of his uncle Sir William. On 28 May of the following year he was created a peer, with the title of Baron Monson of Burton, Lincolnshire. In June 1733, Monson was named Captain of the Honourable Band of Gentlemen Pensioners, and in June 1737 was appointed first commissioner of trade and plantations. In this office, he was confirmed when the board was reconstituted in 1745, and he continued to hold it until his death. On 31 July 1737, he was made a privy councillor.

Monson died on 20 July 1748, and the Duke of Newcastle, in a letter to the Duke of Bedford, dated 12 August 1748, condoles with him upon "the loss of so valuable a man and so amiable a friend" Bedford in reply uses similar expressions of regret.

== Family ==
He married Lady Margaret Watson, youngest daughter of Lewis Watson, 1st Earl of Rockingham, in April 1725; they had three sons: John, 2nd baron Monson (see below); Lewis Thomas, who assumed the name of Watson, and was created Baron Sondes in 1760; and George Monson.

== Notes ==
Attribution

This article incorporates text from a publication now in the public domain: Norgate, Gerald le Grys (1894). "Monson, John (1693-1748)". In Lee, Sidney (ed.). Dictionary of National Biography. Vol. 38. London: Smith, Elder & Co.

Parliament of Great Britain
Preceded by Sir John Tyrwhitt, Bt; Richard Grantham	Member of Parliament for Lincoln; 1722–1728; With: Sir John Tyrwhitt 1722–1727; Charles Hall 1727–1728	Succeeded by Charles Hall; Sir John Tyrwhitt, Bt
Political offices
Preceded by The Earl FitzWalter	President of the Board of Trade; 1737–1748	Succeeded by The Earl of Halifax
Peerage of Great Britain
New creation	Baron Monson; 1728–1748	Succeeded by John Monson
Baronetage of England
Preceded by William Monson	Baronet (of Carleton); 1727–1749	Succeeded by John Monson
