= David Smith (botanist) =

British botanist (1930–2018)

Sir David Smith FRS FRSE FLS

Principal of Edinburgh University
- In office 1987–1994

President of Wolfson College, Oxford
- In office 1994–2000
- Scientific career
- Born: David Cecil Smith; 21 May 1930; Port Talbot, South Wales
- Died: 29 June 2018 (aged 88); Morningside, Edinburgh
- Education: Colston's School; St Paul's School, London
- Alma mater: University of Oxford
- Known for: Discovery that organisms in symbiotic relationship, had similar biological processes.
- Spouse(s): Daphne Osborne (divorced); Lesley Mutch
- Children: Bryony, Adam and Cameron
- Awards: Linnean Gold Medal
- Fields: Botany
- Workplaces: University of California, Berkeley; University of Oxford; University of Bristol; University of Edinburgh
- Doctoral students: Angela Gallop

Sir David Cecil Smith FRS FRSE FLS (born 21 May 1930 Port Talbot, South Wales – 29 June 2018) was a British botanist. Smith was most notable for his research into the biology of symbiosis and became a leading authority on it. Smith discovered that lichens and Radiata (coelenterates) shared a similar biological mechanism in carbohydrate metabolism. Further research by Smith demonstrated similar processes in organisms that worked within a symbiotic relationship.

== Early life and education ==
Smith was the youngest of two sons. His parents were William Smith, a mining engineer, and Elva (née Deeble) who was a teacher. Smith's brother Frank was killed in Canada. His father initially worked as a coal mining engineer in South Wales, before securing a position as the manager of a Manganese mine in Sinai desert following the UK General Strike. The family remained in the Sinai desert until the end of World War II, except for occasional periods of leave. In one such period, Smith was born, and lived in the Sinai desert until he was five, when he returned to the UK to live with his grandparents and aunt, Iris, in Port Talbot where he attended primary school.

When Smith was ten he was sent to boarding school at Colston's School, Bristol. After his parents returned to the UK to live in Hatch End, London, when he was 15 Smith was moved to St Paul's School, London to continue his education. It was while St Paul's School, that his interest in the subject of biology started, while on field trips. He applied to study medicine at University of Oxford. However, he discovered that he could have financial support from a Browne scholarship to study botany at The Queen's College, Oxford, so he changed programme. He was awarded a Bachelor of Arts in Botany, achieving a First-class honours in 1951. Smith immediately followed this with postgraduate research on lichens and was awarded D.Phil in 1954.

== Career and research ==
Smith completed his Doctor of Philosophy in two years, as his National service was impending. He spent his time in Germany, and joined the Intelligence Corps to research Nuclear warfare. Upon returning from National Service, he was appointed to a research fellowship at The Queen's College, Oxford before visiting the United States under a Harkness Fellowship to conduct research at the University of California, Berkeley.

Smith returned to the United Kingdom to a post as a university lecturer in the Department of Agricultural Science at University of Oxford. He was then appointed as a Royal Society Senior research fellow at Wadham College, Oxford, from 1964 to 1971. From 1971 to 1974 Smith followed up that position at the same college as Tutorial Fellow (a senior Oxford academic rank), followed by Admissions Tutor at the same college. His former doctoral students include Angela Gallop.

In 1965, he joined the editorial board of the plant science journal New Phytologist. Shortly afterwards he became Executive Editor (Editor-in-Chief) for 17 years, and continuing as an Editor and serving as a Trustee until the late 1990s.

From 1974 to 1980 Smith held the Melville Wills Chair of Botany at the University of Bristol. Smith returned to a position at Oxford in 1980 as the Sibthorpian Professor of Rural Economy, named in honour of John Sibthorp. He also acted as director of the Department of Agricultural Science.

Between 1987 and 1994, Smith was Principal of the University of Edinburgh. From 1994 to September 2000 he was President of Wolfson College, Oxford He became an Honorary Fellow of Wadham College, Oxford in 2002.

He was a distinguished supporter of Humanists UK.

He was a member of the Advisory Council for the Campaign for Science and Engineering.

=== Honors and awards ===
Smith also received an honorary doctorate from Heriot-Watt University in 1993 He was elected as a fellow of the Royal Society in 1975 and was biological secretary from 1983 to 1987. He was awarded a knighthood in 1986. Smith was awarded the Gold Medal for Botany by the Linnean Society and served as president of the society from 2000 to 2003. In 2003 he received the Acharius Medal from the International Association for Lichenology.

== Personal life ==
Smith married twice, firstly in 1959 to the plant physiologist Daphne Osborne, but they divorced in 1962. In 1965, he married Lesley Mutch, a Scottish doctor and epidemiologist and they had three children together, called Bryony, Adam and Cameron. Upon his retirement, the family returned to Morningside in Edinburgh in 2000.

Academic offices
Preceded by John Harrison Burnett	Principal of Edinburgh University; 1987–1994	Succeeded by Stewart Sutherland, Baron Sutherland of Houndwood
Preceded by William James Kennedy (acting)	President of Wolfson College, Oxford; 1994–2000	Succeeded by Jon Stallworthy (acting)
