= Geoffrey Sims =

British academic

Geoffrey Donald Sims OBE, FREng (13 December 1926 – 5 August 2017) was a British physicist who served as Vice-Chancellor of the University of Sheffield from 1974 to 1991.

== Life ==
Sims was born 13 December 1926 in London. He studied at Imperial College, London, gaining a BSc in physics in 1947 and in mathematics in 1948; an MSc in mathematics in 1950 and a PhD in physics in 1954. He worked for General Electric Company from 1948 to 1954 then the Atomic Energy Authority until 1956 when he joined the academic staff of the Department of Electronics at the University of Southampton, becoming a professor and head of the Department of Electronics at the same university, a position he held from 1963 to 1974.

Sims died on 5 August 2017, at the age of 90.

== Honours ==
Sims was awarded an OBE in 1971. He was made a Fellow of the Academy of Engineering in 1980. He was awarded the honorary degree of LLD of the University of Sheffield in 1991.

Academic offices
| Preceded by Hugh Robson | Vice-Chancellor of the University of Sheffield; 1974–1991 | Succeeded by Gareth Roberts |
