= John Fardell (MP) =

English politician (1784 – 1854)

Member of Parliament for Lincoln
- In office 1830–1831 Serving with Charles Sibthorp
- Preceded by: John Nicholas Fazakerley
- Succeeded by: George Heneage

Personal details
- Born: 4 May 1784
- Died: 5 February 1854 (aged 69)
- Spouse: Mary Fardell (née Tunnard)
- Parents: John Fardell (father); Eleanor Fardell (née Penelope) (mother)

John Fardell Esq. (4 May 1784 – 5 February 1854) was a Tory Member of Parliament for the constituency of Lincoln, England from 1830 till 1831.

He was the first son of John Fardell and Eleanor Penelope. On 26 September 1809, he married Mary Tunnard.

In about 1830, Fardell purchased a manor at Holbeck. He took the old residence which was then a farmhouse occupied by Mr. Hewson. He also purchased the Manor of Greetham, and the rest of the parish, excluding the 48-acre Rectory farm which was purchased by Robert Dennis.
