= Jon Stallworthy =

British literary critic, professor and poet

Jon Howie Stallworthy, FBA, FRSL (18 January 1935 – 19 November 2014) was a British literary critic and poet. He was Professor of English at the University of Oxford from 1992 to 2000, and Professor Emeritus in retirement. He was also a Fellow of Wolfson College, Oxford, from 1986, where he was twice acting president. From 1977 to 1986, he was the John Wendell Anderson Professor of English at Cornell University.

== Biography ==
Stallworthy was born in London. His parents, Sir John Stallworthy and Margaret Stallworthy, were from New Zealand and moved to England in 1934. Stallworthy started writing poems when he was only seven years old. He was educated at the Dragon School, Rugby School and at Magdalen College, Oxford, where he won the Newdigate Prize. His works include seven volumes of poetry, and biographies of Wilfred Owen and Louis MacNeice. He edited several war-related anthologies and is particularly known for his critical work and editorial scholarship on Wilfred Owen and WWI poetry.

While researching the local history of New Zealand Stallworthy discovered an obscure volume entitled Early Northern Wairoa written by his great-grandfather, John Stallworthy (1854–1923), in 1916. From this book he learned that his great-great-grandfather, George Stallworthy (1809–1859), had left his birthplace of Preston Bissett in Buckinghamshire, England, for the Marquesas as a missionary. This discovery led in turn to him finding family-related letters in the archives of the London Missionary Society. Stallworthy's book A Familiar Tree (Oxford University Press, 1978) is a collection of poetry inspired by events depicted in these documents. Singing School is an autobiography which emphasises Stallworthy's development as a poet, and his own published poetry has been described as having “a gift few poets possess, and which all poets wish for — the ability to strike out a memorable and epigrammatic line which is at once simple and deeply disturbing.”

Stallworthy wrote a short summary of war poetry in the introductory chapter to the Oxford Book of War Poetry (Edited by Jon Stallworthy, Oxford University Press, 1984), as well as editing several anthologies of war poetry and writing a biography of WWI trench poet Wilfred Owen. In 2010 he received the Wilfred Owen Poetry Award from the Wilfred Owen Association. In the course of his literary career, he became a Fellow of the Royal Society of Literature and the British Academy.

== Published works ==
- The Astronomy of Love, by Jon Stallworthy. (London: Oxford University Press, 1961)
- Out of Bounds, by Jon Stallworthy. (1963)
- Between the Lines: W. B. Yeats's Poetry in the Making, by Jon Stallworthy. (1963)
- Yeats: Last Poems, a Casebook, by Jon Stallworthy. (London: Macmillan, 1968)
- Root and Branch, by Jon Stallworthy. (New York: Oxford University Press, 1969)
- Positives, by Jon Stallworthy. (1969)
- Vision and Revision in Yeats's Last Poems, by Jon Stallworthy. (1969)
- Five Centuries of Polish Poetry, 1450–1970, by Jerzy Peterkiewicz and Burns Singer; 2nd edition with new poems translated in collaboration with Jon Stallworthy. (London and New York: Oxford University Press, 1970) ISBN 0-19-211298-8
- The Twelve, and Other Poems, by Alexander Blok; translated from Russian by Jon Stallworthy and Peter France. (New York: Oxford University Press, 1970)
- Wilfred Owen, by Jon Stallworthy. (London: Oxford University Press, 1974) ISBN 0-19-211719-X
- Hand in Hand, by Jon Stallworthy. (1974)
- The Apple Barrel, by Jon Stallworthy. (1974)
- A Book of Love Poetry, edited by Jon Stallworthy. (1974)
- A Familiar Tree, by Jon Stallworthy; drawings by David Gentleman. (New York: Oxford University Press, 1978) ISBN 0-19-520050-0
- Selected Poems, by Boris Pasternak; translated from Russian by Jon Stallworthy and Peter France. (New York: W. W. Norton, 1983) ISBN 0-393-01819-9
- The Complete Poems and Fragments, by Wilfred Owen; edited by Jon Stallworthy. (New York: W. W. Norton, 1984) ISBN 0-393-01830-X
- The Oxford Book of War Poetry, chosen and edited by Jon Stallworthy. (Oxford and New York: Oxford University Press, 1984) ISBN 0-19-214125-2
- The Anzac Sonata: new and selected poems, by Jon Stallworthy. (London: Chatto & Windus; New York: W. W. Norton, 1986) ISBN 0-393-02449-0
- Louis MacNeice, by Jon Stallworthy. (New York: W. W. Norton, 1995) ISBN 0-393-03776-2
- The Guest from the Future, by Jon Stallworthy. (Carcanet Press, 1995) ISBN 1-85754-132-4
- The Norton Anthology of Poetry, edited by Margaret Ferguson, Mary Jo Salter, and Jon Stallworthy. (New York: W. W. Norton, 1996) ISBN 0-393-96820-0
- Rounding the Horn: Collected Poems, by Jon Stallworthy. (Carcanet Press, 1998) ISBN 1-85754-163-4
- Singing School: The Making of a Poet, by Jon Stallworthy. (John Murray, 1998) ISBN 0-7195-5715-1
- The Norton Anthology of English Literature: Volume 2C, The Twentieth Century, edited by Jon Stallworthy; M. H. Abrams, general editor; Stephen Greenblatt, associate editor. (New York: W. W. Norton, 2000) ISBN 0-393-97570-3
- Anthem for Doomed Youth: Twelve Soldier Poets of the First World War, compiled and written by Jon Stallworthy; (London: Constable (Hachette UK), 2002, in association with the Imperial War Museum) ISBN 978-1-47211005-3
- Great Poets of World War I: poetry from the great war, by Jon Stallworthy. (New York: Carroll and Graf, 2002) ISBN 0-7867-1098-5
- Body Language, by Jon Stallworthy. (Carcanet Press, 2004) ISBN 1-85754-746-2
- War Poet (Carcanet Press, 2014).

Academic offices
Preceded by Sir David Smith	(Acting) President of Wolfson College, Oxford; 2000	Succeeded by Sir Gareth Roberts
Preceded by Sir Gareth Roberts	(Acting) President of Wolfson College, Oxford; 2006–2008	Succeeded by Hermione Lee
