= William Somerville (agriculturalist) =

Scottish agriculturist (1860–1932)

Sir William Somerville KBE FRSE LLD (1860–1932) was a 19th/20th century Scottish agriculturalist. He is one of the few academics to have taught at both the University of Cambridge and the University of Oxford. He was twice President of the Arboricultural Society: from 1900 to 1901 and from 1922 to 1924.

== Life ==
He was born in Cormiston near Biggar in Lanarkshire on 30 May 1860 the son of Robert Somerville JP (died 1879) a farmer, and his wife, Margaret Alexander.

He was educated at the Royal High School, Edinburgh then went to work on his father's farm.

From 1885, he studied at the University of Edinburgh, graduating with a B.Sc., then did postgraduate studies at the Ludwig-Maximilians-Universität München to receive a doctorate (Dr. oec.) in 1889. In 1891, he was appointed as Professor of Agriculture and Forestry at the University of Newcastle-upon-Tyne. In Newcastle, he set up a new facility at Cockle Park Farm.

In 1899, he transferred to be Professor of Agriculture at the University of Cambridge. He left Cambridge in 1902, and became Professor of Rural Economy at the University of Oxford in 1906. He was the first full-time professor to hold this title.

In 1888, he was elected a Fellow of the Royal Society of Edinburgh. His proposers were Alexander Crum Brown, Robert Wallace, James Geikie, and John Gibson.

He retired in 1926 and later that year was created a Knight Commander of the Order of the British Empire (KBE) by King George V. His position at Oxford was filled by Prof James Anderson Scott Watson.

He died of pneumonia on 17 February 1932 aged 71 at Boar's Hill in Oxford.

== Family ==
In 1888, he married Margaret Elizabeth ("Eliza") Gaukroger, daughter of George Gaukroger JP.
