= Henri Josse =

British politician

Henri Josse (1828–23 July 1893) was a British politician. He was elected as a Liberal Member of Parliament for Great Grimsby in 1892, resigning in 1893 by becoming Steward of the Manor of Northstead. Josse was a naturalised Frenchman, he was a coal merchant in Grimsby as well as a banker in Paris.

Josee resigned his seat in parliament in February 1893 due to pressure of business, he died a few months later on 23 July 1893.

Parliament of the United Kingdom
Preceded by Edward Heneage	Member of Parliament for Great Grimsby; 1892 – 1893	Succeeded by Edward Heneage
