= Canwick =

Village and civil parish in the North Kesteven district of Lincolnshire, England

Coordinates: 53.213617°N 0.527127°W

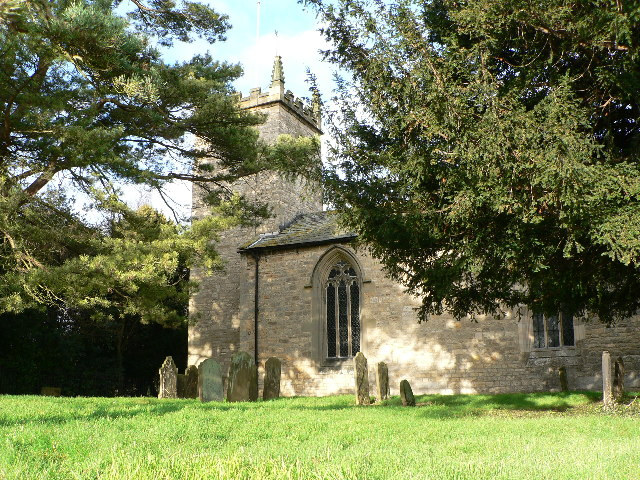
- Church of All Saints, Canwick

- Location within Lincolnshire
- Population: 324 (2011)
- OS grid reference: SK984695
  - London: 115 mi (185 km) S
- District: North Kesteven
- Shire county: Lincolnshire
- Region: East Midlands
- Country: England
- Sovereign state: United Kingdom
- Post town: Lincoln
- Postcode district: LN4
- Dialling code: 01522
- Police: Lincolnshire
- Fire: Lincolnshire
- Ambulance: East Midlands
- UK Parliament: Sleaford and North Hykeham

Canwick is a village and civil parish in the North Kesteven district of Lincolnshire, England. The population of the civil parish at the 2011 census was 324. It is situated 1 mile (1.6 km) south from Lincoln.

The village overlooks the Witham Valley, where the River Witham follows an ice-age cut through the jurassic limestone ridge which forms the spine of the county.

== History ==
Canwick has been continuously occupied since Saxon times (the name derives from "Canna’s Farm" or "Canna’s Place" in Anglo-Saxon), but there was a significant villa here in the Roman period.

Canwick Anglican church is dedicated to All Saints. The fabric dates from the 12th, 14th and early 18th centuries, and the building was restored in the 19th century. It is a Saxon-era foundation, but was significantly improved by the same Norman bishops who built Lincoln Cathedral. The church is built on a Roman tesselated pavement, parts of which were found in 1815, when a vault for the Sibthorp family was being dug in what is now the vestry, and it was also found below the floor of the tower in the early 20th century. A coin of the first Christian Emperor Constantine has been found in the churchyard. The church patronage is held by the Mercers Company, oldest of the London city Livery Companies.

Canwick Hall was the seat of the Sibthorp family from the 17th to the 20th century, with the present structure being erected in 1810. Family members included the botanist John Sibthorp and several MPs, including Colonel Sibthorp. Having already angered Queen Victoria by his opposition to an allowance for her consort Prince Albert, he went on to declare that the Prince's Great Exhibition project would bring the plague to England. The Hall was later home of Arthur Foljambe, 2nd Earl of Liverpool from 1939 to his death there in 1941.

New housing development took place in Canwick during the 1960s and the 2001 United Kingdom census records 339 inhabitants and 150 households. Canwick is a civil and an ecclesiastical parish.

== Canwick Hill ==
Canwick Hill stands to the west of the village and forms a steep incline with a gradient of roughly 14.2%. The hill is the site of the International Bomber Command Centre.
