= Charles Hall (Lincoln MP) =

Charles Hall (1690–1743), of Kettlethorpe, Lincolnshire, was a British Tory politician who sat in the House of Commons from 1727 to 1734.

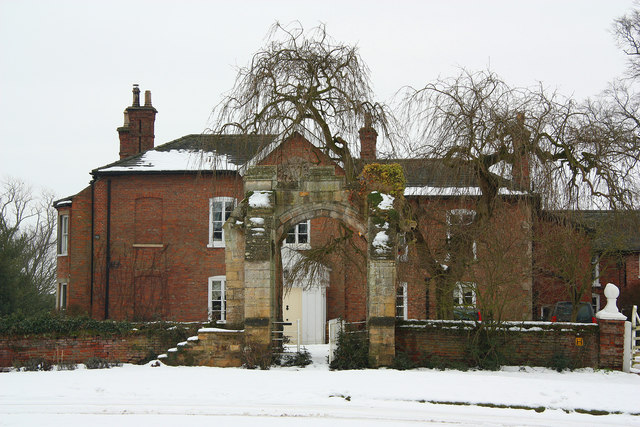
The present Kettlethorpe Hall, built by Charles Hall

Hall was baptized on 6 May 1690, the only son of Thomas Hall of Kettlethorpe and his wife Amy Mildmay, daughter of Henry Mildmay of Graces, Essex. She was previously married to Vincent Amcotts of Harrington, Lincolnshire. He succeeded his father in 1698 and, after he came of age, built the present house at Kettlethorpe Hall in the early 1700s.

Hall was returned in a contest as a Tory Member of Parliament for Lincoln at the 1727 British general election. He voted consistently against the Administration. He did not stand in the 1734 British general election but supported his kinsman, Coningsby Sibthorp instead.

Hall died unmarried on 21 August 1743, leaving all his Lincolnshire estates to his nephew Charles Amcotts.

Parliament of Great Britain
Preceded by Sir John Tyrwhitt, Bt; Sir John Monson	Member of Parliament for Lincoln; 1727–1734; With: Sir John Monson; Sir John Tyrwhitt, Bt 1728	Succeeded by Charles Monson; Coningsby Sibthorpe
