= Baron Heneage =

Title in the Peerage of the United Kingdom

Baron Heneage, of Hainton in the County of Lincoln, was a title in the Peerage of the United Kingdom. It was created on 8 June 1896 for Edward Heneage. He was Chancellor of the Duchy of Lancaster under William Ewart Gladstone between February and April 1886, when he broke with Gladstone over Irish Home Rule. He was succeeded by his eldest son George, the second Baron. He was a Lieutenant-Colonel in the Lincolnshire Regiment and fought in both the Second Boer War and the First World War. He died unmarried and was succeeded by his third and youngest brother, Reverend Edward Heneage, the third Baron. He was Rector of St Mark's Church, Victoria, British Columbia. He was also unmarried and on his death on 19 February 1967 the barony became extinct.

George Fieschi Heneage, father of the first Baron, was Member of Parliament (MP) for Grimsby and for Lincoln, while Edward Heneage, uncle of the first Baron, was Member of Parliament for Grimsby.

== Barons Heneage (1896) ==
- Edward Heneage, 1st Baron Heneage (1840–1922)
- George Edward Heneage, 2nd Baron Heneage (1866–1954)
- The Rev. Thomas Robert Heneage, 3rd Baron Heneage (1877–1967)
