= Sir John Tyrwhitt, 5th Baronet =

British landowner and politician

Sir John Tyrwhitt, 5th Baronet (c. 1663–1741), of Stainfield, Lincolnshire, was a British landowner and politician who sat in the House of Commons between 1715 and 1734.

Tyrwhitt was the only surviving son of Sir Philip Tyrwhitt, 4th Baronet MP of Stainfield, Lincolnshire and his wife Penelope de la Fountain, daughter of Sir Erasmus de la Fountain of Kirkby Beilars, Leicestershire. His father died in July 1688, when he succeeded to the estates and baronetcy. He married his first wife Elizabeth Phillips, daughter of Francis Phillips of Kempton Park, Sunbury, Middlesex on 24 February 1690.

For the year 1693 to 1694 he was High Sheriff of Lincolnshire.

He had a second marriage, by licence on 5 August 1704, to Mary Drake daughter of Sir William Drake of Shardeloes, Buckinghamshire.

Tyrwhitt was returned unopposed as Whig Member of Parliament for Lincoln on his family's interest at the 1715 general election. He supported the Administration in 1716 on the septennial bill, but in 1719 opposed the repeal of the Occasional Conformity and Schism Acts. At the 1722 general election he was elected MP for Lincoln in a contest but was defeated in 1727. However, he regained his seat at a by-election on 5 June 1728. He did not stand at the 1734 general election.

Tyrwhitt died in November 1741. He had three daughters by his first wife, Elizabeth Phillips - Elizabeth, who died as a baby (1694-1694), (Lady) Ann (1696-1787), and Penelope (1693-1754) - and then a son and four daughters by his second wife - John de la Fontaine Tyrwhitt (1708-1760), Sarah (1716-1794), Juliana (?-1773) and Frances (1711-1776). He was succeeded in the baronetcy by his son John.

Parliament of Great Britain
Preceded by Thomas Lister; John Sibthorpe	Member of Parliament for Lincoln; 1715–1727; With: Richard Grantham; Sir John Monson	Succeeded by Charles Hall; Sir John Monson
Preceded by Charles Hall; Sir John Monson	Member of Parliament for Lincoln; 1728–1734; With: Charles Hall	Succeeded by Charles Monson; Coningsby Sibthorpe
Baronetage of England
Preceded by Philip Tyrwhitt	Baronet (of Stainfield); 1688-1741	Succeeded by John de la Fountain Tyrwhitt
