= Gareth Roberts (physicist) =

British physicist

Sir Gareth Gwyn Roberts FRS FREng (16 May 1940 – 6 February 2007) was a Welsh physicist specialising in semiconductors and molecular electronics, who was influential in British science policy through his chairmanship of several academic bodies and his two reports on the future supply of scientists and how university research should be assessed. He was knighted in 1997 for his services to higher education.

== Academic and public service career ==
Born in Penmaenmawr, Caernarvonshire, North Wales, he attended John Bright Grammar School.

He studied physics to PhD level at the University College of North Wales, Bangor, graduating in 1964.

Following a post at the New University of Ulster, he was appointed Professor of Applied Physics at the University of Durham in 1976, where he was elected a Fellow of the Royal Society in 1984. He went back into industry in 1985 as director of research at Thorn EMI plc, and was appointed to a visiting professorship in the Department of Engineering Science at Oxford and to a Fellowship at Brasenose College in 1986. He won the Fernand Holweck Medal and Prize in 1986. He presented the Royal Institution Christmas Lectures in 1988.

He was a member of the Prime Minister's Advisory Council on Science and Technology from July 1989 to July 1992.

He was vice-chancellor of the University of Sheffield from 1991 to 2000. From 1995 to 1997 he was chairman of the Committee of Vice-Chancellors and Principals (now called Universities UK). In 1997 he was also president of the Institute of Physics and was knighted for his services to higher education.

From August 1997 to August 2005 he was on the Higher Education Funding Council for England (HEFCE) Board, and chaired the board's research committee.

He was the founding president of the Science Council from 2000 to 2007.

Roberts received an honorary doctorate from Heriot-Watt University in 2005.

He was appointed president of Wolfson College, Oxford in 2001 and died in office. He also held a visiting professorship in science policy at the Saïd Business School.

He was elected to the Fellowship of the Royal Academy of Engineering in 2003. In June 2006 he was elected chairman to Engineering and Technology Board, succeeding Sir Peter Williams.

== Industrial career ==
He held two major industrial posts, the first in the United States, where he was senior research scientist with the Xerox Corporation and later as director of research and chief scientist of Thorn EMI. He was later chairman of cancer diagnostics and pathology specialist Medical Solutions plc, and of the management committee of the University of Oxford's Begbroke Science Park, and was also a board member of Isis Innovation, the exploitation arm of the university.

== Commissioned reviews ==
=== SET for Success ===
In March 2001, the UK Government commissioned Roberts to undertake a review into the supply of science and engineering skills in the UK. The final report, entitled SET for Success was published on 15 April 2003. The report set out thirty-seven recommendations to the Government, employers and other organisations about how to maintain and develop the supply of people with science, technology, engineering and mathematical skills into research and industry. All his recommendations were accepted by the Government. These included providing additional resources for schools, universities and research bodies, and the promotion of school/business links. The review led to increase of the stipend paid to PhD students, and a number of initiatives to encourage women and young people to consider a career in science.

=== The review of research assessment ===
In June 2002, after the Research Assessment Exercise (RAE) of 2001, the four funding bodies for UK higher education commissioned Sir Gareth Roberts to review the future of research assessment in the UK. The report "The review of research assessment" was issued for consultation in May 2003. Many of Roberts' recommendations were implemented for the 2008 RAE, the first review following the completion of the consultation exercise.

== Personal life ==
On 15 August 1962, at George Street Congregational Church, Croydon, he married Charlotte Standen (b.1942) an insurance clerk, and daughter of Albert John Williams Standen a shop manager. They had two sons and a daughter. The marriage ended in divorce in 1993.

His second wife, Carolyn Mary Rich, née Butler (b.1948), was a health service executive, trained nurse and daughter of Albert Edward Butler, a musician, and former wife of Stephen Rich, whom he married at Leeds register office on 18 February 1994. She had two daughters from her first marriage.

Academic offices
| Preceded by Geoffrey Sims | Vice-Chancellor of the University of Sheffield; 1991–2000 | Succeeded by Bob Boucher |
| Preceded by Jon Stallworthy (acting) | Presidents of Wolfson College, Oxford; 2001–2006 | Succeeded by Jon Stallworthy (acting) |
