= Gervaise Waldo-Sibthorp =

British politician

Member of Parliament for Lincoln
- In office 16 January 1856 – 13 October 1861 Serving with George Heneage
- Preceded by: George Heneage; Charles Sibthorp
- Succeeded by: Charles Seely; George Heneage

Personal details
- Born: 1815
- Died: 13 October 1861 (aged 46)
- Party: Conservative
- Parent(s): Charles Sibthorp; Maria Ponsonby Tottenham

Gervaise Tottenham Waldo-Sibthorp (1815 – 13 October 1861) was a British Conservative Party politician.

One of four children of Charles Sibthorp and Maria Ponsonby Tottenham, Waldo-Sibthorp married Louisa Amcotts and had two children: Montagu Richard and Coningsby Charles.

Waldo-Sibthorp was elected Conservative MP for Lincoln at a by-election in 1856—caused by the death of his father—and held the seat until his own death in 1861.

== Family ==
Sibthorp family tree

John Sibthorpe (1669–1718)
Coningsby Sibthorp (1706–1779)	Humphry Sibthorp (1713–1797)
Humphrey Sibthorp (1744–1815)	John Sibthorp (1758–1796)
Charles Sibthorp (1783–1855)
Gervaise Waldo-Sibthorp (1815–1861)

Parliament of the United Kingdom
Preceded by Charles Sibthorp; George Heneage	Member of Parliament for Lincoln; 1856–1861; With: George Heneage	Succeeded by Charles Seely; George Heneage
