= Hugh Robson (educator) =

British academic

Sir Hugh Norwood Robson (18 October 1917 – 11 December 1977) was a Scottish physician noted as a university administrator in several countries, including Vice-Chancellor of the University of Sheffield from 1966 to 1974 and Principal of the University of Edinburgh from 1974 to 1977. The Hugh Robson Building in George Square (part of the University of Edinburgh) is named after him, as is the Hugh Robson Computer Laboratory.

== Life ==
Known as Norrie, Robson was born in 1917 in Langholm, Dumfriesshire, the son of Elizabeth Warnock, a farmer's daughter, and Hugh Robson, a civil servant in the Inland Revenue. He was educated at Langholm Academy then Dumfries Academy.

He studied medicine at the University of Edinburgh graduating with an MB ChB in 1941. He then, as his service during the Second World War, joined the Royal Navy Volunteer Reserve and served in Singapore as a Lieutenant Surgeon.

Returning to the University of Edinburgh as a lecturer in 1947 after serving as a surgeon lieutenant in the RNVR during the Second World War. He then became a senior lecturer at the University of Aberdeen, then a professor of medicine at the University of Adelaide. In 1966 he returned to the UK and took up the post of Vice-Chancellor of the University of Sheffield. His years as Principal there, and also at Edinburgh, were impacted by the Robbins Report, which significantly increased student numbers.

In 1974 he was knighted by Queen Elizabeth II and returned to the University of Edinburgh as Principal and Vice-Chancellor. In 1975 he received an honorary LLD from the University of Sheffield and a second honorary doctorate (DSc) from the University of Pennsylvania. In the same year he was elected a Fellow of the Royal Society of Edinburgh. His proposers were Anthony Elliot Ritchie, John Cameron, Lord Cameron, Neil Campbell, Lord Balerno and Hugh Ernest Butler. In 1976 he was elected a member of the Harveian Society of Edinburgh.

He died in Edinburgh on 11 December 1977.

== Family ==
He married Alice Livingstone (who was also a Doctor) in 1942 just prior to going on active service. They had one son and two daughters.

== Hugh Robson Building ==
Hugh Robson has a lasting memorial in place in George Square, Edinburgh, where the University of Edinburgh named a building on their campus after him.

The building was built in 1978 as part of the general redevelopment of the Square which had been acquired by the University in the 1960s.

It houses a computer lab for students.

Academic offices
| Preceded by Arthur Roy Clapham | Vice-Chancellor of the University of Sheffield; 1966–1974 | Succeeded by Geoffrey Sims |
| Preceded by Michael Swann | Principals of the University of Edinburgh; 1974–1979 | Succeeded by John Harrison Burnett |
