= Geoffrey E. Blackman =

British botanist (1903–1980)

Geoffrey Blackman FRS
- Born: Geoffrey Emett Blackman; 17 April 1903
- Died: 8 February 1980 (aged 76)
- Education: King's College School
- Alma mater: University of Cambridge
- Scientific career
- Workplaces: University of Oxford

Geoffrey Emett Blackman (1903-1980) FRS was the Sibthorpian Professor of Rural Economy at the University of Oxford from 1945 to 1970 and Director of Agricultural Research Council Unit of Experimental Agronomy from 1950 to 1970.

The Biology War Committee (BWC) was jointly established by the Association of Applied Biologists, the British Ecological Society, and the Society for Experimental Biology following discussions that began in 1940 and came to fruition in late 1941. Answerable to the Joint Government Committee of research organisations (Agricultural Research Council, Department of Scientific and Industrial Research, and Medical Research Council), the BWC sought to inform government about ongoing biological research in universities and research institutes, and to identify new projects that might help the war effort. In some instances, it was able to provide financial support using monies supplied by the Joint Committee. The man whose untiring efforts helped set it up and later, as its untiring Secretary, kept it running was Geoffrey Blackman of Imperial College.

Four of the BWC’s larger projects were:

Medicinal plants; finding and exploiting pharmaceuticals and vitamins from plants, using sphagnum moss as a wound dressing
The writing of an advisory booklet, "Living in the Jungle", for troops fighting in the tropics

The preparation of a memorandum, "On the Dangers of Swimming in Tropical Waters"

A survey of the occurrence of Frangula alnus (Alder Buckthorn), a source of charcoal for munition fuses.

Other projects, often smaller and unsuccessful, ranged from determining the optimal mixture of grass species for aerodromes and the suitability of Juncus gerardii as camouflage, to comparing seaweed species to find the best source of agar. The question was asked, Why was Germany importing Erica scoparia from Spain? Did its bark have antiseptic properties? An answer was never forthcoming.

In 1944, the Allies invaded the beaches of northern France (D-day) and the thoughts of the BWC naturally turned to the re-occupation of Europe. What were the new issues it might address?

From experiences gained in the blitzed cities of Britain, the BWC decided that high priority should be given to control measures to deal with outbreaks of rats, blowflies etc. due to the presence of buried and damaged food stores, etc.; the combating of dry rot in timber; mosquito control, especially in deep shelters; and clothes moths and the proofing of blankets.
