= Charles Seely (politician, born 1803) =

British Liberal Party politician

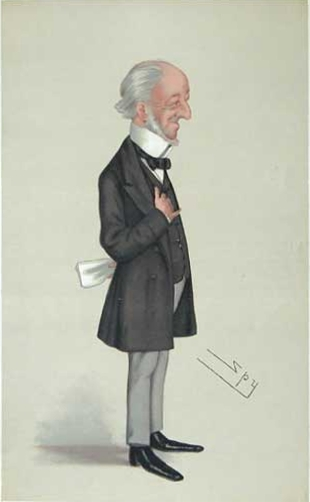
"Pigs" As depicted by "Spy" (Leslie Ward) in Vanity Fair, 21 December 1878

Charles Seely (3 October 1803 – 21 October 1887) was a 19th-century industrialist and British Liberal Party politician, who served as a Member of Parliament (MP) for Lincoln from 1847 to 1848 and again from 1861 to 1885. He was one of the wealthiest industrialists of the Victorian era. He was an enthusiastic supporter of the Lincoln Mechanics' Institute.

== Personal life ==
Seely was born and educated in Lincoln. His parents were Charles Seely (1768–1809) and Ann Wilkinson of Lincoln. He married Mary Hilton in 1831.

== Hosting Garibaldi ==
In 1864, Seely was the Deputy Lieutenant for Lincolnshire, when he played host to the Italian revolutionary Giuseppe Garibaldi, when Garibaldi visited 26 Prince's Gate Hyde Park, his house in London and Seely's estate at Brook House on the Isle of Wight. Garibaldi stayed at Brook House from 3 to 11 April, during which time he was also joined by Giuseppe Mazzini, the Italian writer and politician whose efforts helped bring about the modern Italian state. During this time Garibaldi raised funds for his Italian campaigns. On 11 April Garibaldi left Brook House with Seely and travelled from Southampton to London, where he was greeted by crowds estimated at half a million people, according to the Illustrated London News. Garibaldi stayed several days at Seely's house in London where a reception was hosted for him on 19 April. The next day he travelled to the Guildhall where he was given the Freedom of the City of London.

== Wealth ==
Seely made his fortune in the Industrial Revolution through milling, agricultural machinery and coal mining. On his death in 1887, "his personal estate was valued at almost £500,000, and real estate worth £2 million", equivalent to 322 million UK Pounds in 2018 or 2 billion UK pounds as a proportion of UK GDP. He was chairman of the House of Commons Committee on Admiralty Reform in 1868. In a Vanity Fair "Spy" cartoon of 1878, on notable people of the day, he was caricatured as "Pigs," a reference to the pig iron ballast that he produced for the Royal Navy. He diversified his fortune into acquiring coal mines and property: in 1883 he owned 9,264 acres on the Isle of Wight, 2,929 in Worcestershire and 394 in Bedfordshire. By 1900 the family estates in the Isle of Wight comprised almost the entire west side of the island.

In the 1870s he commissioned Myles Birket Foster to paint 50 watercolours of Venice.

== Descendants ==
Five other members of his family became Members of Parliament during the 19th, 20th and 21st centuries:

- His grandson, the Secretary of State for War (1912–1914), Major General John Edward Bernard Seely, 1st Baron Mottistone.
- His eldest son Sir Charles Seely, 1st Baronet.
- His grandson Sir Charles Seely, 2nd Baronet.
- His great-grandson the Joint Under-Secretary of State for Air (1941–1945) Sir Hugh Seely 3rd Baronet, and 1st Baron Sherwood.
- His great-great grandson Peter John Philip Seely, 5th Baron Mottistone (1949–2013) was a godson of Queen Elizabeth II's husband Prince Philip, Duke of Edinburgh.
- His great-great-great-grandson Bob Seely was elected in 2017 as Member of Parliament for the Isle of Wight.

His great-grandson David Peter Seely, 4th Baron Mottistone was baptised with Winston Churchill and the then Prince of Wales (subsequently Edward VIII) as his godparents, was the Deputy Lieutenant for Lincolnshire, Lord Lieutenant of the Isle of Wight and its last Governor. His youngest sister Jane Anne Seely married (1882) Henry George Gore-Browne who received the Victoria Cross during the Indian Mutiny in 1857. Henry was a great-great grandson of the 1st Earl of Altamont MP, whose heir is the Marquess of Sligo.

His great grandson (son of John Edward Bernard Seely, 1st Baron Mottistone) was the architect John Seely, 2nd Baron Mottistone.

== Sources ==
- Mark Acton and Stephen Roberts (2019), Charles Seely of Lincoln. Liberalism and Making Money in Victorian England Kindle Publishing. ISBN 978-1796273823
- Burke's Peerage and Baronetage 107th Edition Volume III
- Seely Baronetcy family crest
- Seely Baronets
- The London Illustrated News 1864
- Istituto Internazionale di Studi, Rome, Italy. Chronology of life of GIUSEPPE GARIBALDI
- John Edward Seely, 1st Baron Mottistone, Dictionary of National Biography, 1941–1950
- Vanity Fair, 1878, Spy Cartoon of Charles Seely
- Galloper Jack by Brough Scott, published by Macmillan in 2004 (ISBN 0-333-98938-4).
- Wight Life April/May 1975 article on The Seely Family and their Island Homes
- University of London & History of Parliament Trust
- Garibaldi e le donne, con documenti inediti

By Giacomo Emilio Curàtulo &

Parliament of the United Kingdom
Preceded by Charles Sibthorp; William Rickford Collett	Member of Parliament for Lincoln; 1847–1848; With: Charles Sibthorp	Succeeded by Charles Sibthorp; Thomas Hobhouse
Preceded by George Heneage; Gervaise Sibthorp	Member of Parliament for Lincoln; 1861–1885; With: George Heneage, to 1862; John Bramley-Moore, 1862–1865; Edward Heneage, 1865–1868; John Hinde Palmer, 1868–1974; Edward Chaplin, 1874–1880; John Hinde Palmer, 1880–1884; Joseph Ruston, 1884–1885	Succeeded by Joseph Ruston
