= Charles Monson (MP) =

British politician (c. 1695 – 1764)

Member of Parliament for Lincoln (UK Parliament constituency)
- In office 1734–1754
- Preceded by: Charles Hall (1690-1743)
- Preceded by: Sir John Tyrwhitt, 5th Baronet
- Succeeded by: George Monson (1730-1776)
- Succeeded by: John Chaplin (d. 1764)

Deputy Paymaster of the Forces
- In office 1737–1746

Personal details
- Born: c. 1695
- Died: 26 August 1764 (aged 68–69)

Charles Monson (c. 1695 – 26 August 1764) was a British politician who served in the Parliament of Great Britain between 1734 and 1754.

== Early life and education ==
Monson was born around 1695. He graduated from Pembroke College, Cambridge on 11 February 1713.

== Political career ==
Monson first attempted to run for Parliament in 1728, but was defeated. He ran again in 1734 and was successful. In 1737, he was appointed Deputy Paymaster of the Forces with an annual salary of 1000 pounds. He was re-elected to parliament in 1741, and he resigned his deputy paymaster position in 1746, because it had become inconsistent with a seat in the House of Commons under the Place Act 1742. He was re-elected to his final term in 1747, and he retired in 1754.

== Death ==
Monson died on 26 August 1764.

Parliament of Great Britain
Preceded by Charles Hall (1690–1743); Sir John Tyrwhitt, 5th Baronet	Member of Parliament for Lincoln; 1734 - 1754; With: Coningsby Sibthorpe (1734-1741; 1747-1754); Sir John Tyrwhitt, 6th Baronet (1741-1747)	Succeeded by George Monson (1730-1776); John Chaplin (d. 1764)
