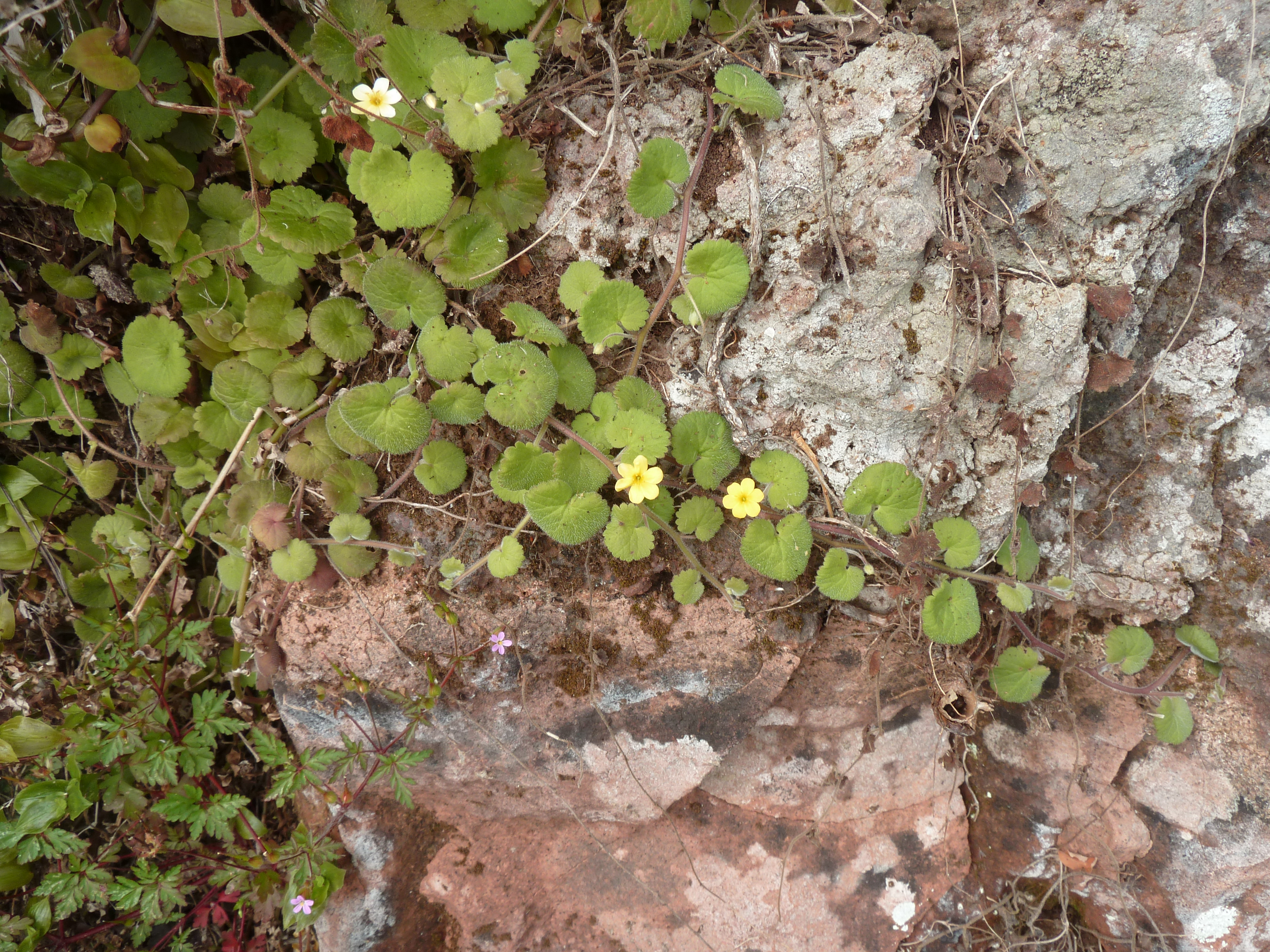
- Sibthorpia peregrina

Scientific classification
- Kingdom: Plantae
- Clade: Tracheophytes
- Clade: Angiosperms
- Clade: Eudicots
- Clade: Asterids
- Order: Lamiales
- Family: Plantaginaceae
- Tribe: Sibthorpieae
- Genus: Sibthorpia; L.

Species
- See text

Synonyms
- Disandra L.; Willichia Mutis ex L.

= Sibthorpia =

Genus of Plantaginaceae plants

Sibthorpia is a genus of flowering plants in the family Plantaginaceae, with a peculiar distribution in the mountains of North America, South America and Africa, and the coasts of Europe.

== Species ==
Currently accepted species include:

- Sibthorpia africana L.
- Sibthorpia conspicua Diels
- Sibthorpia europaea L.
- Sibthorpia peregrina L.
- Sibthorpia repens (Mutis ex L.) Kuntze
