= Thomas Scrope (1723–1792) =

Thomas Scrope (1723–1792) was an English landowner and Wilkite politician. He inherited while still young Coleby Hall, at Coleby in Lincolnshire, and represented Lincoln in the House of Commons from 1768 to 1774. His time in public life was interrupted by two brief periods during which he was confined as a lunatic.

== Life ==
He was the fifth son of Gervase Scrope of Cockerington and his wife Frances Lister, daughter of Thomas Lister. He was educated at Lincoln School and matriculated at Christ Church, Oxford in 1740.

Scrope put himself forward as a candidate in a 1756 by-election for New Romney. He was a "freak candidate", according to Brooke, and withdrew on finding he lack serious support; in the end Rose Fuller was unopposed. When Scrope in 1757 commanded a militia company under Sir John Cust, 3rd Baronet, Cust found him troublesome. Standing at Lincoln in 1761, Scrope came bottom of the poll. He petitioned against the election of Coningsby Sibthorp alleging bribery. The petition was withdrawn but Scrope was aggrieved at Sir William Meredith's failure to promote him, and made a scene from the Commons gallery on 18 November 1761, heckling Cust, the Speaker of the House. He was confined to a madhouse for about a month, writing an apology to Cust on 31 December.

In 1764 Scrope was unsuccessful in the by-election at Aylesbury caused by the expulsion from parliament of John Wilkes, using the slogan "Wilkes and Liberty". In May that year a commission of lunacy had Scrope confined, for six months. Scrope used systematic bribery to come top of the poll at Lincoln in 1768.

== Family ==
Scrope married in 1780, Eliza Maria Clay, daughter of William Clay of Southwell, Nottinghamshire. The couple had no children. Eliza survived him, marrying again to Albemarle Bertie, and dying in 1806. Most of the old Lister estates then passed to Stephen Tempest of Broughton-in-Craven.
