= Edward Chaplin (politician) =

British Conservative politician

Colonel The Right Honourable Edward Chaplin

Member of Parliament for Lincoln
- In office 1874–1880 Serving with Charles Seely
- Preceded by: Charles Seely; John Hinde Palmer
- Succeeded by: Charles Seely; John Hinde Palmer

Personal details
- Born: 28 March 1842 Ryhall, Rutland
- Died: 23 December 1883 (aged 41) Marylebone, London
- Spouse: Lady Guendolen Chetwynd-Talbot (m. 1877; died 1883)
- Relations: Henry Chaplin, 1st Viscount Chaplin (brother)
- Children: Muriel Theresa Chaplin; Sibell Evelyn Chaplin
- Parent(s): Henry Chaplin; Caroline Horatia Ellice

Colonel Edward Chaplin (28 March 1842 – 23 December 1883) was a British Conservative politician.

== Early life ==
Chaplin was born on 28 March 1842 at Ryhall, Rutland into an old Lincolnshire family. He was the son of Rev. Henry Chaplin and Caroline Horatia Ellice. Among his siblings was elder brother Henry Chaplin, 1st Viscount Chaplin, who inherited substantial estates in Lincolnshire (including the family seat of Blankney Hall), Nottinghamshire and Yorkshire.

His maternal grandfather was William Ellice. Among his family were his niece, Edith (who married the 7th Marquess of Londonderry), and nephew, Eric Chaplin, 2nd Viscount Chaplin.

== Career ==
Chaplin served as a Lieutenant Colonel of the Coldstream Guards.

Chaplin sat as Member of Parliament for Lincoln alongside Charles Seely between 1874 and 1880.

== Personal life ==
On 18 January 1877, Chaplin was married to Lady Guendolen Theresa Chetwynd-Talbot, a daughter of Charles Chetwynd-Talbot, 19th Earl of Shrewsbury and Anna Theresa Cockerell (a granddaughter of architect Samuel Pepys Cockerell and grandniece of Sir Charles Cockerell, 1st Baronet). Together, they were the parents of:

- Muriel Theresa Chaplin (1877–1947), who died unmarried.
- Sibell Evelyn Chaplin (1879–1960), who married Thomas Arthur Armstrong, a son of Maj. Arthur John Armstrong, in 1919.

Chaplin died at Marylebone, in the City of Westminster, in December 1883, aged 41. His wife later remarried Maj. Archibald Cosmo Little, son of Gen. Sir Archibald Little, in 1887, before her death in January 1937.

Parliament of the United Kingdom
Preceded by Charles Seely; John Hinde Palmer	Member of Parliament for Lincoln; 1874–1880; With: Charles Seely	Succeeded by Charles Seely; John Hinde Palmer
