= George Heneage =

British politician

George Fieschi Heneage (22 November 1800 – 11 May 1864) was a British Whig politician.

== Background ==
Heneage was the son of George Robert Heneage of Hainton Hall, Lincolnshire, and Frances Anne Ainslie, daughter of Lieutenant-General George Ainslie. His middle name derived from his descent from Roboaldo Fieschi, Conte di Lavagna. He was educated at Eton College (1817) and Trinity College, Cambridge (1818), and succeeded his father to the Hainton estate in 1833.

== Political career ==
Heneage was elected at the 1826 general election as a Member of Parliament (MP) for Great Grimsby, but when he stood for re-election in 1830 he was defeated by the Tory candidate George Harris.

At the 1831 general election Heneage was elected as a Member of Parliament for Lincoln. He was re-elected in 1832, but did not contest the seat at the 1835 general election.

He did not stand for Parliament again until the 1852 general election, when he was returned as an MP for Lincoln. He was re-elected in 1857 and as a Liberal in 1859, but resigned his seat in January 1862 (by taking the Chiltern Hundreds) in order to contest a by-election in Great Grimsby. He was defeated in Grimsby by 446 votes to 458, and lodged an election petition against the result. The petition was dismissed, and he did not stand again.

He also served as High Sheriff of Lincolnshire in 1839

== Family ==
Heneage married Frances Tasburgh, daughter of Michael Tasburgh, in 1833. Their son Edward was also a politician and was elevated to the peerage as Baron Heneage in 1896. Frances died in 1842. Heneage remained a widower until his death in May 1864, aged 63.

Parliament of the United Kingdom
Preceded by William Duncombe; Charles Tennyson	Member of Parliament for Great Grimsby; 1826–1830; With: Charles Wood	Succeeded by Charles Wood; George Harris
Preceded by Charles Sibthorp; John Fardell	Member of Parliament for Lincoln; 1831–1835; With: Charles Sibthorp 1831–1832; Edward Bulwer 1832–1835	Succeeded by Edward Bulwer; Charles Sibthorp
Preceded by Charles Sibthorp; Thomas Hobhouse	Member of Parliament for Lincoln; 1852–1862; With: Charles Sibthorp 1852–1856; Gervaise Sibthorpe 1856–1861; Charles Seely 1861–1862	Succeeded by Charles Seely; John Bramley-Moore
