= Richard Ellison (politician) =

British politician

Richard Ellison (1754 – 7 July 1827) was a British politician.

He was the eldest son of Richard Ellison, banker, of Sudbrooke Holme, Lincolnshire.

He was appointed High Sheriff of Lincolnshire in 1793 and was Member of Parliament (MP) for Lincoln from 1796 to 1812, and for Wootton Bassett from 1813 to 1820. He became Recorder of Lincoln and a member of the Board of Agriculture (1798).

He married twice; firstly Hannah, the daughter of John Cookson of Whitehill, co. Durham and secondly Jane Maxwell, with whom he had 4 sons. He also had an illegitimate daughter.

Richard Ellison MP is the great-great-great grandfather of Richard Ellison (cricketer).

Parliament of Great Britain
Preceded by George Rawdon; The Lord Hobart	Member of Parliament for Lincoln; 1796 – 1800; With: George Rawdon to 1800; Humphrey Sibthorp from 1800	Succeeded by Parliament of the United Kingdom
Parliament of the United Kingdom
Preceded by Parliament of Great Britain	Member of Parliament for Lincoln; 1801 – 1812; With: Humphrey Sibthorp to 1806; William Monson 1806–1808; The Earl of Mexborough	Succeeded by John Fazakerley; Sir Henry Sullivan
Preceded by James Kibblewhite; John Attersoll	Member of Parliament for Wootton Bassett; 1813–1820; With: John Attersoll to April 1813; Robert Rickards April 1813–1816; William Taylor Money 1816–1820	Succeeded by Horace Twiss; Sir George Philips, Bt
