= John Sibthorp =

English botanist (1758–1796)

John Sibthorp FRS
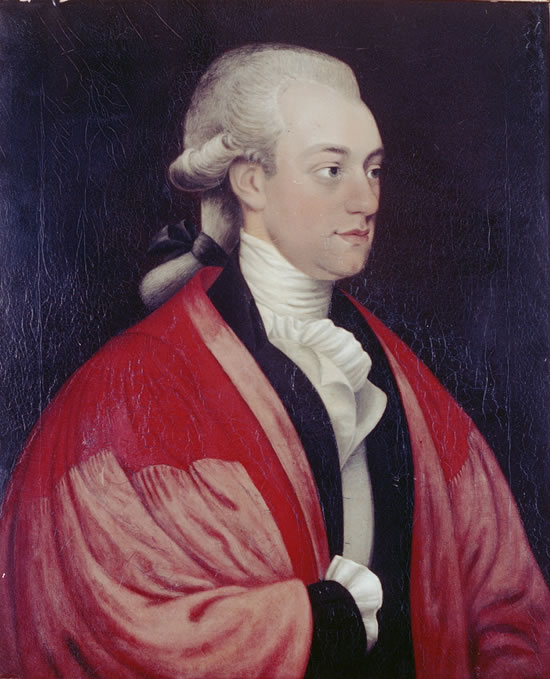
- Sibthorp in a doctoral robe
- Born: 28 October 1758; Oxford, England
- Died: 8 February 1796 (aged 37); Bath, Somerset, England
- Education: University of Oxford; University of Edinburgh; University of Montpellier
- Parent: Humphry Sibthorp
- Scientific career
- Fields: Botany
- Author abbrev. (botany): Sibth.

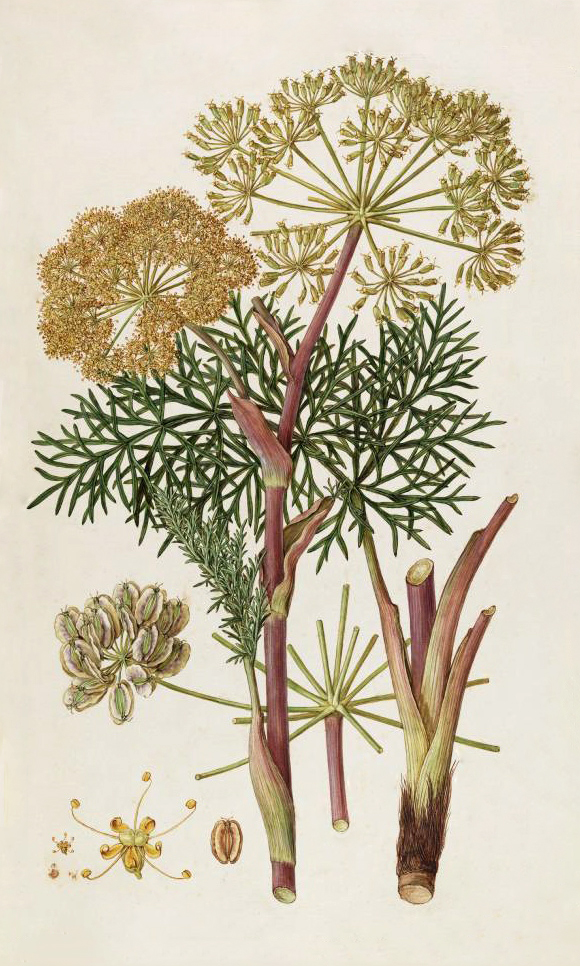
Thapsia garganica by Ferdinand Bauer from drawings made for "Flora Graeca"

John Sibthorp FRS (28 October 1758 – 8 February 1796) was an English botanist.

== Education ==
Sibthorp graduated from the University of Oxford in 1777 where he was an undergraduate student at Lincoln College, Oxford. He subsequently studied medicine at the University of Edinburgh and University of Montpellier.

== Career and research ==
In 1784, he succeeded his father to the Sherardian chair. Leaving his professional duties to a deputy, he left England for Göttingen and Vienna, in preparation for a botanical tour of Greece (1786) and Cyprus (1787).

Returning to England at the end of the following year, he took part in the foundation of the Linnean Society of London in 1788, and set to work on a Flora of Oxfordshire, which was published in 1794 as Flora Oxoniensis. He was elected as a Fellow of the Royal Society in Mar 1788.

He made a second journey to Greece, but developed consumption on the way home and died in Bath on 8 February 1796. He was buried at Bath Abbey, with a monument carved by John Flaxman which includes a garland of Sibthorpia europaea.

His will bequeathed his books on natural history and agriculture to the University of Oxford, and also founded Oxford's Sibthorpian Professorship of Rural Economy (subsequently titled the Sibthorpian Professorship of Plant Science). He directed that his endowment should first be applied to the publication of his Flora Graeca and Florae Graecae Prodromus, for which, however, he had done little beyond collecting some three thousand species and providing the plates. The task of preparing the works was undertaken by Sir J.E. Smith, who issued the two volumes of the Prodromus in 1806 and 1813, and six volumes of the Flora Graeca between 1806 and 1828. The seventh appeared in 1830, after Smith's death, and the remaining three were produced by John Lindley between 1833 and 1840. The work's first edition ran to a mere thirty copies and featured 966 colour plates; a supplementary volume depicting wildflowers of Corfu was painted for Frederick North, 5th Earl of Guilford, and founder of the Ionian Academy, by G. Scola (or Scala), a talented botanical illustrator.

The standard botanical author abbreviation Sibth. is applied to species he described.

=== Herbarium ===
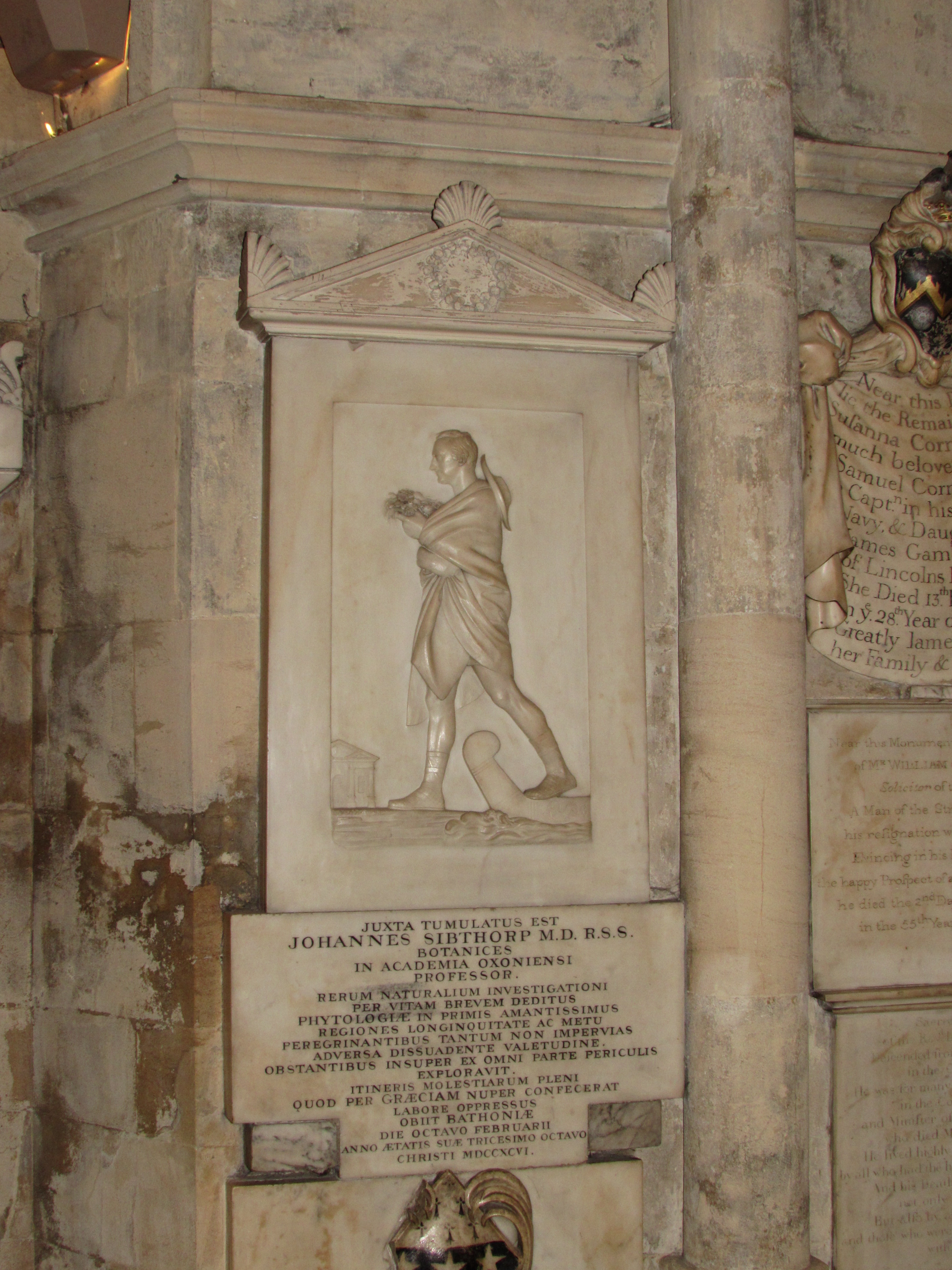
Memorial to Sibthorp in Bath Abbey

His herbarium (of three collections; 2,462 'Flora Graeca' specimens, 70 'Flora Oxoniensis' specimens and 444 miscellaneous specimens) is stored within the Fielding-Druce Herbarium of the University of Oxford.

=== Sibthorpian Chair and Professor ===
The chair of Sibthorpian Professor at the University of Oxford is named after him. Current and previous holders include

- Nicholas Harberd (since 2007)
- Chris J. Leaver (1990–2007)
- David Smith (1980–1987)
- Geoffrey Emett Blackman (1945–1980)
- James Anderson Scott Watson
- John Harrison Burnett
- Joseph Henry Gilbert

== Personal life ==
Sibthorp was born in Oxford, the youngest son of Humphry Sibthorp (1713–1797), who, from 1747 to 1784, served as Sherardian Professor of Botany at the University of Oxford and his first wife Sarah Waldo.

Sibthorp family tree

John Sibthorpe (1669–1718)
Coningsby Sibthorp (1706–1779)	Humphry Sibthorp (1713–1797)
Humphrey Sibthorp (1744–1815)	John Sibthorp (1758–1796)
Charles Sibthorp (1783–1855)
Gervaise Waldo-Sibthorp (1815–1861)
