= Humphry Sibthorp (botanist) =

British botanist (1713–1797)

- Born: 1713
- Died: 1797 (aged 83–84)
- Children: Humphrey Sibthorp; John Sibthorp
- Parent: John Sibthorpe
- Scientific career
- Fields: Botany

Humphry Waldo Sibthorp (1713–1797) was a British botanist. He was a younger son of John Sibthorpe, MP for Lincoln and Mary Browne, daughter of Humphrey Browne of Lincoln.

After the death of Johann Jacob Dillenius (1684–1747), he became the Sherardian Professor of Botany at the University of Oxford from 1747 to 1783. He is known for having taught one course for 37 years. He began the catalogue of the plants of the botanical garden of the university, Catalogus Plantarum Horti Botanici Oxoniensis.

The genus Sibthorpia, in the plantain family of plants is named after him. It was published by Carl Linnaeus in his book Species Plantarum in 1753.

== Family ==
He married firstly Sarah, daughter of Isaac Waldo of Streatham, and secondly Elizabeth Gibbes, daughter of John Gibbes, merchant, of London and Instow, Devon. His youngest son was the botanist John Sibthorp (1758–1796), who continued the Catalogus Plantarum. His oldest son, Humphrey, was a Tory MP for Lincoln. His daughter, Sarah, married Montague Cholmeley (b. 8 Jul 1743 - d. 9 Sep 1843) and was the mother of Sir Montague Cholmeley, 1st Baronet. Another daughter Mary Elizabeth was the second wife of Sir Thomas Sewell, Master of the Rolls.

Sibthorp family tree

John Sibthorpe (1669–1718)
Coningsby Sibthorp (1706–1779)	Humphry Sibthorp (1713–1797)
Humphrey Sibthorp (1744–1815)	John Sibthorp (1758–1796)
Charles Sibthorp (1783–1855)
Gervaise Waldo-Sibthorp (1815–1861)
