= Charles Sibthorp =

British Ultra-Tory politician

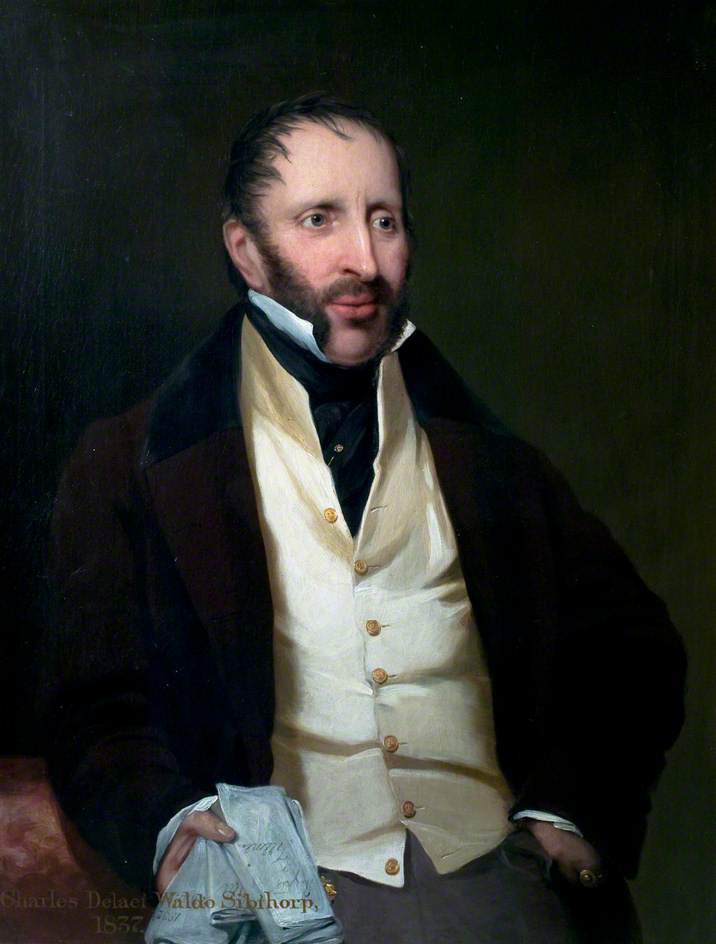
- Portrait of Sibthorp by John Andrews.

Member of Parliament for Lincoln
- In office 1835–1856

Member of Parliament for Lincoln
- In office 1826–1832

Personal details
- Born: 14 February 1783 Lincoln, Great Britain
- Died: 14 December 1855 (aged 72) London, United Kingdom
- Party: Tory/Ultra-Tory
- Children: Gervaise Waldo-Sibthorp
- Parent: Humphrey Sibthorp

Military service
- Allegiance: United Kingdom
- Branch/service: British Army
- Years of service: 1803–1822
- Rank: Lieutenant Colonel
- Unit: 4th Dragoon Guards; Scots Greys

Charles de Laet Waldo Sibthorp (14 February 1783 – 14 December 1855), popularly known as Colonel Sibthorp, was a widely caricatured British Ultra-Tory politician in the early 19th century. He sat as a Member of Parliament for Lincoln from 1826 to 1832 and from 1835 until 1855.

Sibthorp was born into a Lincoln gentry family, the son of Colonel Humphrey Waldo Sibthorp, of Canwick Hall, by his wife Susannah, daughter of Richard Ellison, of Sudbrooke Holme, Lincolnshire. Charles's brother, Richard Waldo Sibthorp (1792–1879), was an Anglican priest who gained notoriety for his 1841 conversion to Roman Catholicism (and who subsequently returned to the Anglican Church). He was commissioned into the Scots Greys in 1803, promoted lieutenant in 1806, and later transferred to the 4th Dragoon Guards, in which he reached the rank of captain. He did not serve abroad and continued in the service until 1822, when he succeeded to the family estates and also succeeded his brother as Lieutenant Colonel of the Royal South Lincolnshire Militia. In 1812, he married Maria Tottenham, daughter and co-heiress of Ponsonby Tottenham, MP for Fethard, County Wexford; they had four children. They were divorced in 1828 due to his adultery with Sara Ward.

== Member of Parliament ==
During Sibthorp's three decades in Parliament, he became renowned, along with Sir Robert Inglis, as one of its most reactionary members. He stoutly opposed Catholic Emancipation, Emancipation of the Jews in England, the Reform Act 1832, the repeal of the Corn Laws, the 1851 Great Exhibition and the construction of the National Gallery. He was convinced that any changes from the Britain of his youth (in the late 18th century) were signs of degeneracy, that Britain was about to go bankrupt, and that the new railways were a passing fad which would soon give way to a return to "chaises, carriages and stages".

He was opposed to all foreign influences, and offended Queen Victoria with his public suspicions of Prince Albert, the prince consort. His political views, his bluntness in expressing them, and his eccentricities made him the target of both witticisms and cartoons in Punch.

He was returned to Parliament on eight occasions.

Sibthorp died at his home in London, and was succeeded as MP by his son, Gervaise Waldo-Sibthorp.

== Family ==
Sibthorp family tree

John Sibthorpe (1669–1718)
Coningsby Sibthorp (1706–1779) | Humphry Sibthorp (1713–1797)
Humphrey Sibthorp (1744–1815) | John Sibthorp (1758–1796)
Charles Sibthorp (1783–1855)
Gervaise Waldo-Sibthorp (1815–1861)

Parliament of the United Kingdom
| Preceded by John Williams; Robert Percy Smith | Member of Parliament for Lincoln; 1826–1832; With: John Fazakerley to 1830; John Fardell 1830–1831; George Heneage from 1831 | Succeeded by Edward Lytton Bulwer; George Heneage |
| Preceded by George Heneage; Edward Lytton Bulwer | Member of Parliament for Lincoln; 1835–1856; With: Sir Edward Lytton Bulwer, Bt, to 1841; William Collett 1841–1847; Charles Seely 1847–1848; Thomas Hobhouse 1848–1852; George Heneage from 1852 | Succeeded by Gervaise Waldo-Sibthorp; George Heneage |
