= Humphrey Sibthorp (1744–1815) =

British politician

Member of Parliament for Boston
- In office 1777–1784

Member of Parliament for Lincoln
- In office 1800–1806

Personal details
- Children: Charles Sibthorp; Richard Sibthorp
- Parent: Humphry Sibthorp

Humphrey Sibthorp (3 October 1744 – 25 April 1815) was a British Tory politician who sat in the House of Commons in two periods between 1777 and 1806.

Sibthorp was the eldest surviving son of the botanist Humphry Sibthorp and his first wife Sarah Waldo, daughter of Isaac Waldo of Streatham, Surrey. He was educated at Harrow School in 1755 and Westminster School in 1756. In 1758 he matriculated at Corpus Christi College, Oxford on 24 May and was awarded BA in 1762 and MA in 1766. He entered Lincoln's Inn in 1766 and was called to the bar in 1770.

At the 1774 general election, Sibthorp stood for Parliament at Lincoln and Newark, and was bottom of the poll in both constituencies. He was elected as a Member of Parliament (MP) for Boston at a by-election on 3 May 1777, after the death of Charles Amcotts MP. He was re-elected in 1780, but was defeated at the 1784 general election.

Sibthorp was elected as a Member of Parliament (MP) for Lincoln at a by-election on 9 April 1800, after the death of George Rawdon MP. He was re-elected in 1802, but declined to stand 1806 general election, because of ill-health.

Sibthorp's sons include Charles Sibthorp, an MP notorious for his Ultra-Tory views, and Richard Sibthorp, an Anglican priest who gained notoriety for his conversion to Roman Catholicism.

== Family ==
Sibthorp family tree

John Sibthorpe (1669–1718)
Coningsby Sibthorp (1706–1779)	Humphry Sibthorp (1713–1797)
Humphrey Sibthorp (1744–1815)	John Sibthorp (1758–1796)
Charles Sibthorp (1783–1855)
Gervaise Waldo-Sibthorp (1815–1861)

Parliament of Great Britain
Preceded by Charles Amcotts; Lord Robert Bertie	Member of Parliament for Boston; 1777 – 1784; With: Lord Robert Bertie to 1782; Sir Peter Burrell from 1782	Succeeded by Sir Peter Burrell; Dalhousie Watherston
Preceded by George Rawdon; Richard Ellison	Member of Parliament for Lincoln; April 1800 – Dec 1800; With: Richard Ellison	Succeeded by Parliament of the United Kingdom
Parliament of the United Kingdom
Preceded by Parliament of Great Britain	Member of Parliament for Lincoln; 1801 – 1806; With: Richard Ellison	Succeeded by William Monson; Richard Ellison
