= John Sibthorpe =

English politician

Member of Parliament for Lincoln
- In office 1713–1715

Personal details
- Children: Coningsby Sibthorp; Humphry Sibthorp

John Sibthorpe (1669–1718), of St. Mark's, Lincoln, was an English politician.

He was the son of Gervase Sibthorpe of St Mark's and Judith Riggall, daughter of Mark Riggall and widow of Benjamin Marshall, and was educated at Christ Church, Oxford.

He was a Member (MP) of the Parliament of Great Britain for Lincoln from 1713 to 1715, but made very little impact in the House.

He was buried on 27 April 1718 at St. Mark's church. He had married in 1703, Mary, the daughter and coheiress of Humphrey Browne of Lincoln and had 4 sons and a daughter. His widow acquired Canwick Hall, near Lincoln, which his son Coningsby Sibthorp, MP for Lincoln for many years and High Sheriff of Lincolnshire in 1733, would go on to inherit in 1727. A younger son, Humphry Sibthorp, was a noted botanist who held a chair in botany at Oxford University.

== Family ==
Sibthorp family tree

John Sibthorpe (1669–1718)
Coningsby Sibthorp (1706–1779)	Humphry Sibthorp (1713–1797)
Humphrey Sibthorp (1744–1815)	John Sibthorp (1758–1796)
Charles Sibthorp (1783–1855)
Gervaise Waldo-Sibthorp (1815–1861)
