= Bad Habit =

A bad habit is a negative behaviour pattern.

Bad Habit may also refer to:

== Albums ==
- Bad Habit (album) or the title song, by Alee, 2017
- Bad Habit, a 2012 EP by Madilyn Bailey
- Bad Habit, a 2020 EP by Levi Kreis
- Bad Habit, a 2008 EP by Team Robespierre

== Songs ==
- "Bad Habit" (Foals song), 2013
- "Bad Habit" (Steve Lacy song), 2022
- "Bad Habit", by Ben Platt from Sing to Me Instead, 2019
- "Bad Habit", by Better Off, 2018
- "Bad Habit", by Black Stone Cherry from Family Tree, 2018
- "Bad Habit", by Destiny's Child from Destiny Fulfilled, 2004
- "Bad Habit", by Hanna Ferm, 2018
- "Bad Habit", by Imelda May from Life Love Flesh Blood, 2017
- "Bad Habit", by the Buoys, 2021
- "Bad Habit", by the Kooks from Listen, 2014
- "Bad Habit", by the Offspring from Smash, 1994
- "Bad Habit", by Sarah Hudson from Naked Truth, 2004
- "Bad Habit", by the Secret Sisters from Put Your Needle Down, 2014
- "Bad Habit", by Whistle, 1990
- "Bad Habit", by Zia, 2010

== Other uses ==
- Bad Habit, an American rock band featuring John Altenburgh

== See also ==
- Bad Habits (disambiguation)
- Habit (disambiguation)
- One Bad Habit (disambiguation)
