= King's Cross fire =

1987 tube station fire in London, England

Coordinates: 51.5304°N 0.1239°W

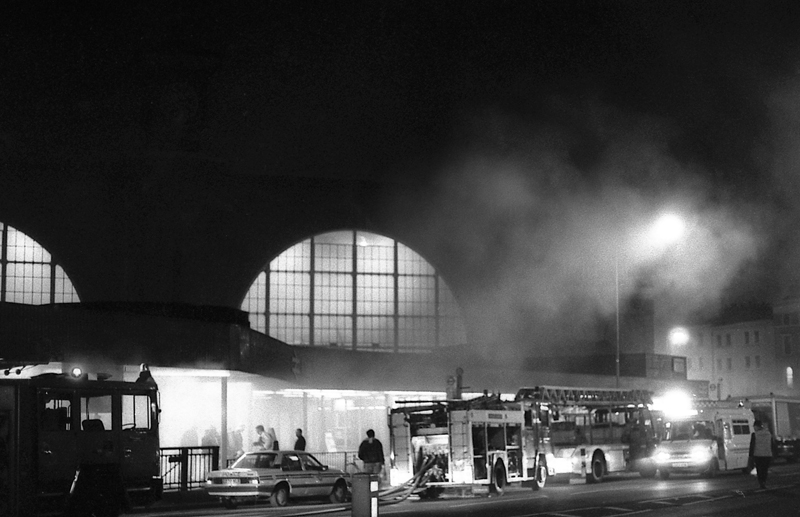
- A police car, three fire engines and an ambulance outside King's Cross
- Date: 18 November 1987; 39 years ago
- Time: 19:30
- Location: King's Cross St Pancras tube station, London, England
- Type: Structure fire
- Cause: Lit match discarded on wooden escalator; rapid spread due to the trench effect
- Deaths: 31
- Injuries: 100

The King's Cross fire occurred on 18 November 1987 at King's Cross St Pancras tube station in London, England, causing 31 fatalities. It began under a wooden escalator before spreading into the ticket hall in a flashover.

The fire began at approximately 19:30 at a major interchange on the London Underground. As well as the mainline railway stations above ground and subsurface platforms for the Metropolitan, Circle and Hammersmith & City lines, there were platforms deeper underground for the Northern, Piccadilly and Victoria lines.

A public inquiry was conducted from February to June 1988. Investigators reproduced the fire twice, once to determine whether grease under the escalator was ignitable, and again to determine whether a computer simulation of the fire—which indicated the cause of the flashover—was accurate. The inquiry determined that the fire had been started by a lit match being dropped onto the escalator. The fire seemed minor until it suddenly increased in intensity and shot a violent and prolonged tongue of fire, and billowing smoke, up into the ticket hall. This sudden transition in intensity, and the spout of fire, was due to the previously unknown trench effect, discovered by the computer simulation of the fire and confirmed by the tests on scale models.

London Underground was strongly criticised for its attitude toward fires; staff were complacent because there had never been a fatal fire on the system, and had been given little or no training on how to deal with fires or evacuation. The inquiry report resulted in resignations amongst the senior management of both London Underground and London Regional Transport and led to the introduction of new fire safety regulations. Wooden escalators were gradually replaced with metal escalators on the Underground.

== Fire ==
At the time, King's Cross St Pancras tube station had subsurface platforms for the Metropolitan, Circle and Hammersmith & City lines. (Note: At the time of the fire, the Hammersmith & City line was treated as part of the Metropolitan line; it was not shown as a separate line until 1990.) Deeper underground were the platforms for the Northern line City branch and the Piccadilly and Victoria lines. An escalator shaft led down to the Victoria line and another led down to the Piccadilly line, and from that to the Northern line. Stairs connected the Piccadilly and Victoria line platforms and from these there was a subway to King's Cross Thameslink railway station platforms used by British Rail Midland City (later Thameslink) trains to Moorgate and an entrance in Pentonville Road.

At approximately 19:30, several passengers reported seeing a fire on a Piccadilly line escalator. Officers of the British Transport Police (BTP) and station staff went to investigate and on confirming the fire one of the police officers went to the surface to radio for the London Fire Brigade (LFB), which sent four fire appliances and a turntable ladder at 19:36. The fire was beneath the escalator and was impossible to reach by use of a fire extinguisher. There was water fog equipment, but staff had not been trained in its use. At 19:39, BTP officers made the decision to evacuate the station using the Victoria line escalators. The LFB arrived at around this time and several firefighters went down to the escalator to assess the incident. They found a fire about the size of a large cardboard box and made a plan for firefighters wearing breathing apparatus to tackle it with a water jet.

By 19:42, before the firefighting operations could be implemented, the entire escalator was aflame, producing superheated gas which rose to the top of the shaft enclosing the escalator. There, it was trapped against the tunnel ceiling which was covered with about twenty layers of old paint from past repainting. As the superheated gases pooled along the ceiling of the escalator shaft, the layers of paint began absorbing the heat. A few years before the fire, the Underground's director of operations had warned that the accumulated paint might pose a fire hazard. However, painting protocols were not in his purview and his warning was largely ignored.

At 19:45, there was a flashover and a jet of flames shot up the escalator shaft, striking the ceiling of the ticket hall and filling it with intense heat and thick black smoke, killing or seriously injuring most of the people still in the ticket hall. It also trapped several hundred people below ground but they escaped on Victoria line trains. A police constable, Richard Kukielka, found a seriously injured man and tried to evacuate him via the Midland City platforms, but found the way blocked by a locked Bostwick gate (Note: A collapsible lattice gate often used in Tube stations, old-style lifts etc.) until it was unlocked by a passing cleaner. Staff and a police officer trapped on a Metropolitan line platform were rescued by a train.

At 22:00, the full horror of the fire blaze was evident as the death toll rose to 28. David Fitzsimons, a Metropolitan Police superintendent, told reporters: "We are talking about a major tragedy; many people are horribly burned."

Thirty fire crews—over 150 firefighters—were deployed. Fourteen London Ambulance Service ambulances ferried the injured to local hospitals, including University College Hospital. The fire was declared out at 01:46 the following day. On a television programme about the fire, an official described King's Cross underground station's layout as "an efficient furnace".

== Victims ==
Thirty-one people died in the incident and 100 people were taken to hospital, 19 with serious injuries.

LFB Station Officer Colin Townsley from Soho fire station was in charge of the first pump fire engine to arrive at the scene and was in the ticket hall at the time of the flashover. He was killed; his body was found beside that of a badly burnt passenger at the base of the exit steps onto Pancras Road. It is believed that Townsley spotted the passenger in difficulty and stopped to help her.

An initially unidentified man, commonly known as "Michael" or "Body 115" in reference to a mortuary tag, was finally identified on 22 January 2004, when forensic evidence confirmed he was 73-year-old Alexander Fallon of Falkirk, Scotland.

== Aftermath ==
The ticket hall and platforms for the Metropolitan and Circle lines were undamaged and reopened next morning; the Victoria line, its escalators only slightly damaged, resumed normal operation on the following Tuesday. The ticket hall for the three tube lines was reopened in stages over four weeks. The three escalators for the Piccadilly line had to be replaced, the new ones being commissioned on 27 February 1989, more than 16 months after the fire. Until then, the Piccadilly line could only be reached via the Victoria line or Midland City platforms, and at peak hours in one direction only.

Access to the Northern line platforms was indirect, its escalators connecting with the Piccadilly line. As the traffic from all three tube lines would have overcrowded the Victoria line escalators, Northern line trains did not stop at King's Cross until repairs were complete. The nearly-life-expired Northern line escalators were replaced as well; the Northern line station reopened, completing the return to normal operation, on 5 March 1989.

== Investigation and report ==
A public inquiry into the incident was initiated by Prime Minister Margaret Thatcher. It was conducted by Desmond Fennell, assisted by a panel of four expert advisers. The inquiry opened on 1 February 1988 at Central Hall, Westminster, and closed on 24 June after hearing 91 days of evidence.

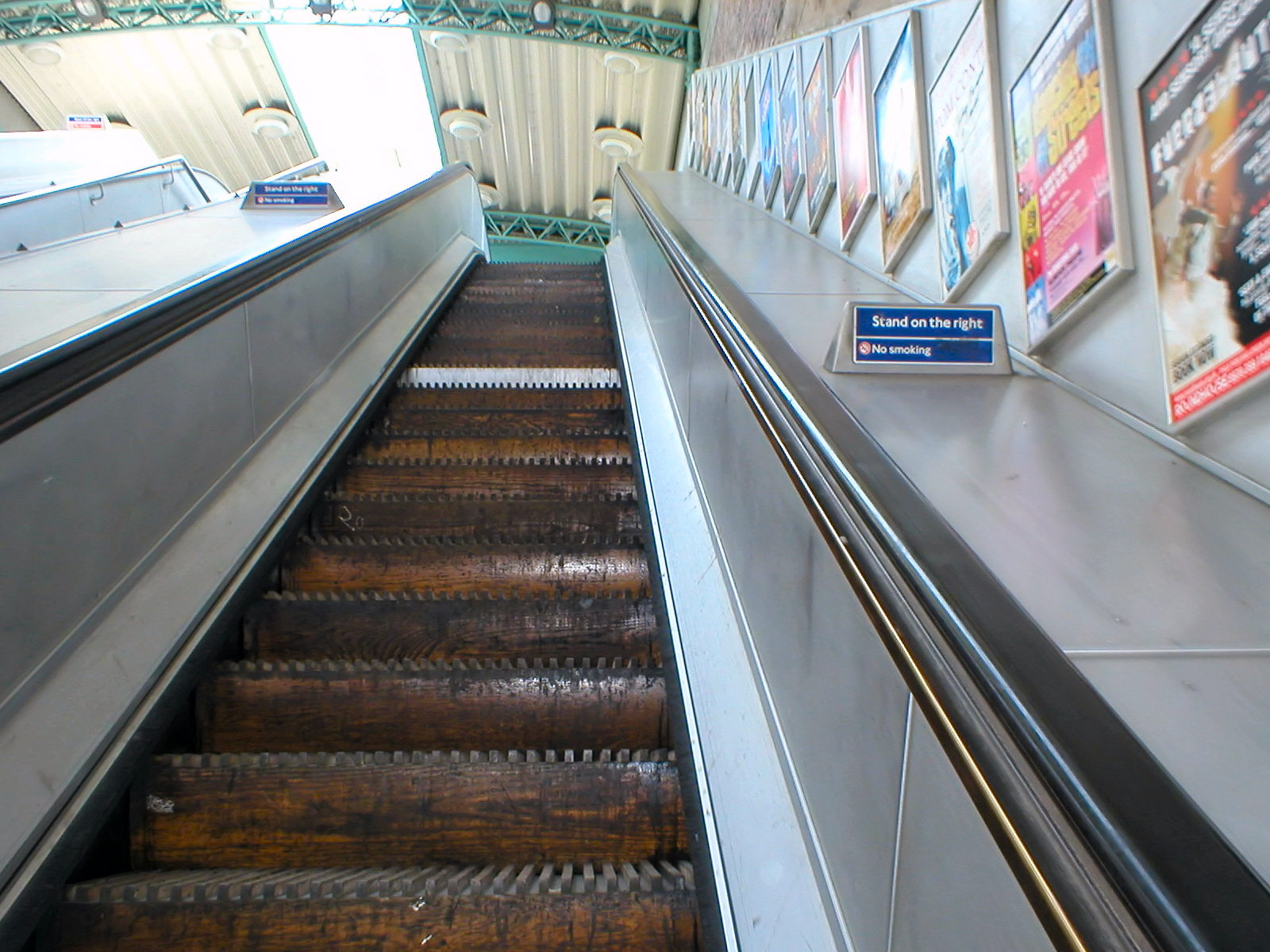
The now-decommissioned wooden escalator at Greenford station (seen in 2006), similar to the one that caught fire at King's Cross

Smoking on Underground trains had been banned in July 1984, over three years before the fire. Following a fire at Oxford Circus station in November 1984, the ban was extended to all Underground stations in February 1985. However, smokers often ignored this and lit cigarettes on the escalators on their way out. The inquiry found that the fire was most probably caused by a traveller discarding a burning match that fell down the side of the moving staircase on to the running track of the escalator. The police determined that the fire had not been started deliberately as there was no evidence that an accelerant had been used and access to the site of the fire was difficult. Investigators found charred wood in eight places on a section of skirting on an escalator and matches in the running track, suggesting that similar fires had started before but had burnt themselves out without spreading. The investigators found a build-up of lubricant grease under the tracks, which was believed to be difficult to ignite and slow to burn once it started, but it was noted that the grease was heavily saturated with fibrous materials (fluff from clothes, tickets and other small litter, human hair, rat fur, etc.). A test was conducted where lit matches were dropped on the escalator to see if ignition would occur. Dropped matches ignited the contaminated grease and the fire began spreading. It was allowed to burn for nine minutes before being extinguished.

This test confirmed the initial eyewitness reports up to that point, but four expert witnesses could not agree as to how the small fire flashed over, with some concern that the paint used on the ceiling had contributed to the fire. A model of King's Cross station was built at the Atomic Energy Research Establishment using computer simulation software; this showed the flames lying down along the floor of the escalator rather than burning vertically before producing a jet of flame into the ticket hall. The result matched the eyewitness accounts of the fire, but the simulation's depiction of the fire burning parallel to the 30-degree slope of the escalator was thought by some to be unlikely and it was suspected that the simulation might be faulty. Experiments were conducted with a one-third-scale replica of the escalator built at the UK's Health and Safety Executive site at Buxton. After seven-and-a-half minutes of normal burning, the flames lay down as in the computer simulation. The metal sides of the escalator served to contain the flames and direct the heat ahead of the fire. When the wooden treads of the escalator flashed over, the size of the fire increased dramatically and a sustained jet of flame was discharged from the escalator tunnel into the model ticket hall. The 30-degree angle of the escalators was discovered to be crucial to the incident, and the large number of casualties in the fire was an indirect consequence of a fluid flow phenomenon that was later named the trench effect. This phenomenon was unknown before the fire. The conclusion was that this newly discovered trench effect had caused the fire to flash over at 19:45.

London Underground was strongly criticised in the report for its attitude to fires underground, underestimating the hazard because no one had previously died in a fire on the Underground. Staff were expected to send for the LFB only if the fire was out of control, dealing with it themselves if possible. Fires were described as "smouldering", and staff had little or no training to deal with fires or evacuation.

== Legacy ==
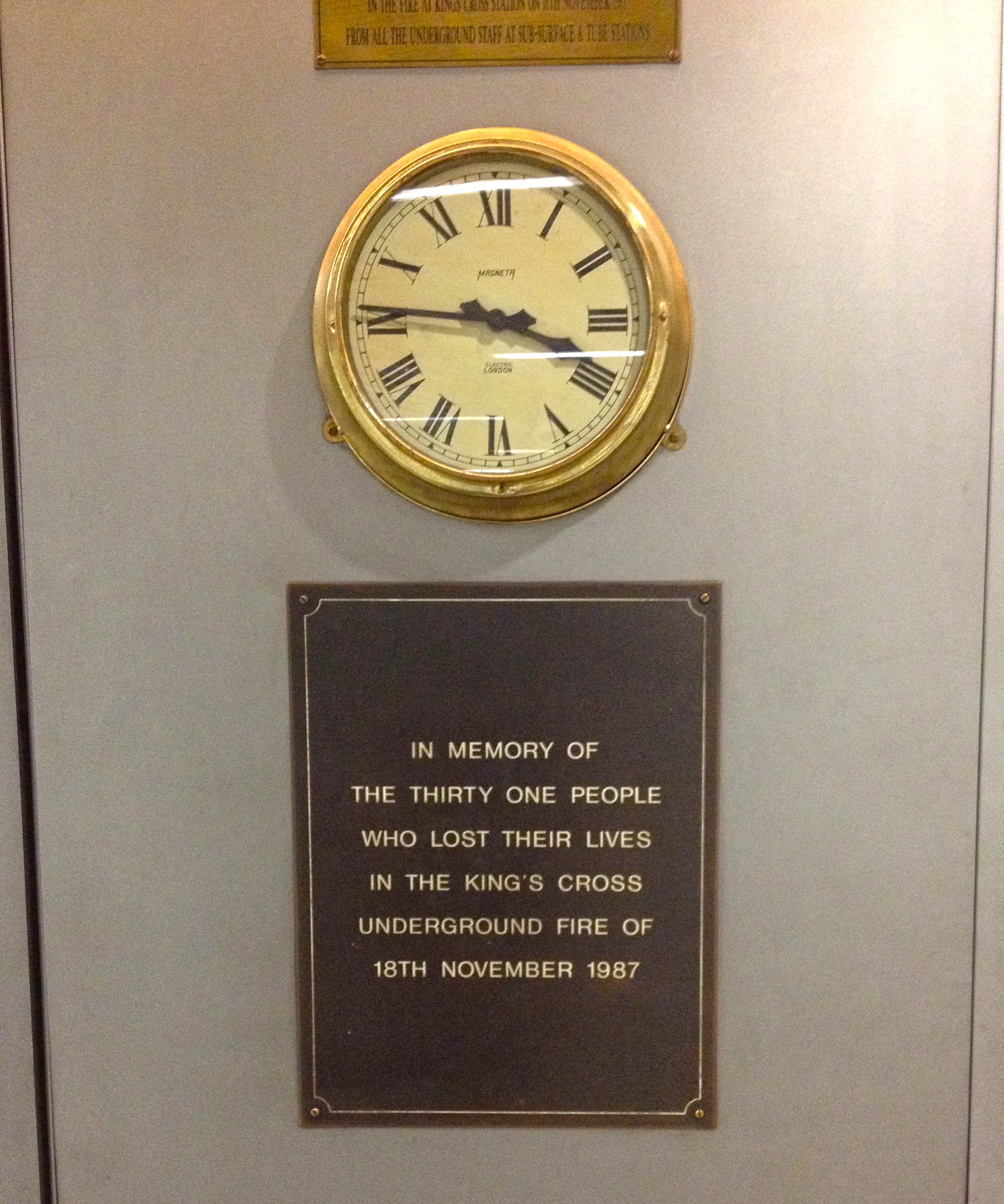
Memorial plaque with the clock to the 1987 fire in the station

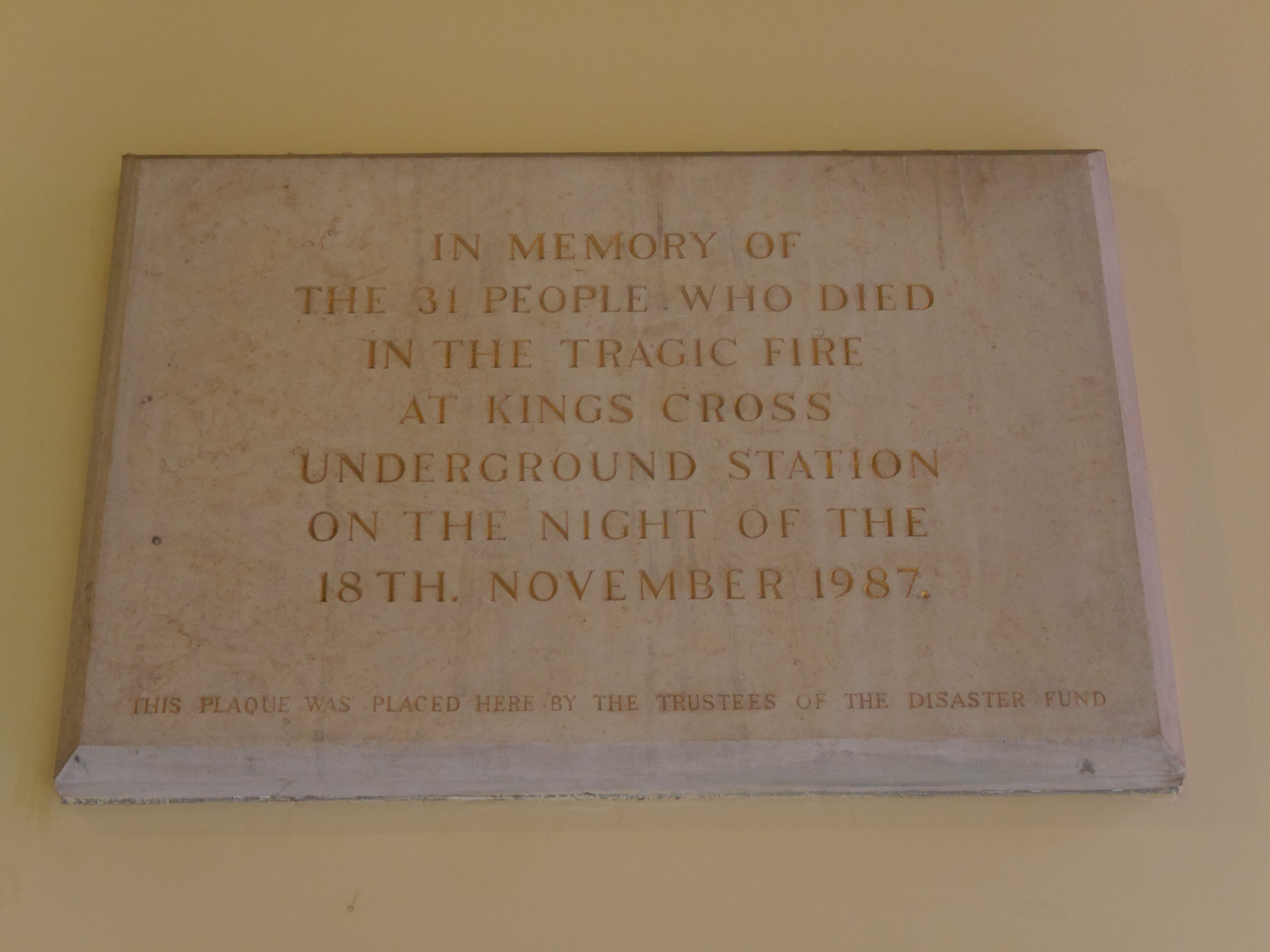
Memorial to the 1987 fire in St Pancras New Church

The publication of the report led to resignations amongst the senior management of both London Underground and London Regional Transport (LRT), including Keith Bright, the chairman of LRT. To improve safety in future, wooden panelling was to be removed from escalators, heat detectors and sprinklers were to be fitted beneath escalators and the radio communication system and station staff emergency training were to be improved.

The Fire Precautions (Sub-surface Railway Stations) Regulations 1989 were introduced. Smoking was banned in all London Underground stations, including on the escalators, on 23 November, five days after the fire. Wooden escalators were gradually replaced, a process which took until 2014 (those at Wanstead were replaced in 2003 and at Marylebone in 2004), with the last wooden escalator (at Greenford on the Central line) being decommissioned on 11 March 2014.

By 1997, the majority of the recommendations of the Fennell report had been implemented, with safety improvements including the removal of any hazardous materials, CCTV fitted in stations, installation of fire alarms and sensors and the issuing of personal radios to staff. In addition to the report's recommendations, London Regional Transport removed polyurethane gloss paint from ceilings above escalators; as The Times reported in 1989, analysis of the victims determined that at least 23 of the 31, including Townsley, had been killed not by the fire but by inhaling cyanide from the smoke of the burning paint, which had been installed to counter spray-paint graffiti. A witness at the inquiry, Patrick Toseland, reported finding lethal cyanide levels in the majority of victims he had examined but the point was not made in the final report.

London Underground was also recommended by the Fennell Report to investigate "passenger flow and congestion in stations and take remedial action". Consequently, parliamentary bills were tabled to permit London Underground to improve and expand the busiest and most congested stations, such as London Bridge, Tottenham Court Road, Holborn and King's Cross St Pancras.

Subsequently, major tube stations have been upgraded and expanded to increase capacity and improve safety. London Bridge was upgraded in conjunction with the Jubilee Line Extension project, which opened in 1999, King's Cross St Pancras was substantially upgraded and expanded as a component of the High Speed 1 project in the late 2000s, and Tottenham Court Road was expanded as part of the Crossrail project in the mid-2010s.

The fire also led to improvement in firefighters' equipment: yellow plastic leggings that melted in the heat and rubber gloves that limited movement were replaced with more effective clothing.

Six firefighters received certificates of commendation for their actions at the fire, including Station Officer Townsley who was given the award posthumously. Townsley was also posthumously awarded the George Medal, the UK's 2nd highest civilian bravery award.

Soon after the fire a commemoration service was held at St Pancras Church. Further commemoration services were held on 18 November 2002, the 15th anniversary of the blaze, on the 20th anniversary in 2007 at the station itself, on the 25th anniversary in 2012 at the Church of the Blessed Sacrament near the station, and on the 30th anniversary in 2017 at the station, with the laying of a wreath.

Memorial plaques commemorating the disaster were installed at St Pancras Church, unveiled by Diana, Princess of Wales, and at King's Cross station.

== In popular culture ==
The Blue Zone single "On Fire", with a young Lisa Stansfield on lead vocals, was hastily withdrawn from sale, stalling at No. 99 in the UK Singles Charts.

The Nick Lowe song "Who Was That Man?" from the 1990 album Party of One tells the story of the only then-unidentified victim of the King's Cross Fire, identified in 2004 as Alexander Fallon.

Charles Duhigg in his 2012 book The Power of Habit discusses how bad corporate culture and inefficient management led to the disaster at King's Cross.

The poem "Tube Ride to Martha's" by Matthew Sweeney describes the final hours of a victim of the King's Cross Fire.

== See also ==
- List of transportation fires

== Notes and references ==
=== Bibliography ===
- Croome, Desmond F.; Jackson, Alan Arthur (1993). Rails Through the Clay: A History of London's Tube Railways. Capital Transport. ISBN 978-1-85414-151-4.
- Fennell, Desmond (1988). Investigation into the King's Cross Underground Fire (PDF) (Report). London: Department of Transport. ISBN 0-10-104992-7 – via the Railways Archive.
