= Habit (disambiguation) =

A habit is a routine of behavior that is repeated regularly and tends to occur subconsciously.

Habit or Habits may also refer to:

== Apparel ==
- Religious habit, a distinctive dress worn by the members of a religious order
- Riding habit, women's clothing for horseback riding
- Judge's habit, a traditional dress worn by judges
- Keffiyeh, a traditional Arab headdress, sometimes called a habit
- Sudarium, worn by Jewish men after wedding

== Art, entertainment, and media ==
=== Film ===
- Habit (1921 film), an American silent film
- Habit (1997 film), an American horror film
- Habit (2021 film), an American drama film

=== Music ===
- Habit (album), by U;Nee, 2007
- Habits (album), by Neon Trees, 2010
- Habit (EP), by Snail Mail, 2016
- "Habit" (song), by Sekai no Owari, 2022
- "Habit", a 2012 song by Adler from Back from the Dead
- "Habit", a 2011 song by Alexis Jordan from Alexis Jordan
- "Habit", a 2018 song by Andrew Hyatt from Cain
- "Habit", a 2010 song by Cathy Davey from The Nameless
- "Habit", a 2010 song by Curve from Rare and Unreleased
- "Habit", a 2006 song by Elvira Nikolaisen from Quiet Exit
- "Habit", a 1999 song by Enuff Z'Nuff from Paraphernalia
- "Habit", a 2018 song by Lil Durk from Signed to the Streets 3
- "Habit", a 2020 song by Louis Tomlinson from Walls
- "Habit", a 2008 song by the Movement from Set Sail
- "Habit", a 1996 song by Pearl Jam from No Code
- "Habit", a 1999 song by Sarah Slean from Blue Parade
- "Habit", a 2017 song by Seventeen from Al1
- "Habit", a 2012 song by Tulisa from The Female Boss
- "Habit", a 2017 song by Uniform from Wake in Fright
- "Habit", a 2018 song by Ili
- "Habits (Stay High)", a 2013 song by Tove Lo
- "Habits" (Eminem song), 2024
- "Habits", a 2017 song by Day6 from Moonrise
- "Habits", a 1992 song by Fred Frith and François-Michel Pesenti from Helter Skelter
- "Habits", a 2024 song by Gary Clark Jr. from JPEG Raw
- "Habits", a 1984 song by Grace Slick from Software
- "Habits", a 2010 song by the Grand Opening from In the Midst of Your Drama
- "Habits", a 2012 song by Katie Kim from Cover & Flood
- "Habits", a 2017 song by Machine Gun Kelly from Bloom
- "Habits", a 2011 song by Maria Mena from Viktoria
- "Habits", a 2018 song by Marmozets from Knowing What You Know Now
- "Habits", a 2019 song by Nav from Bad Habits
- "Habits", a 2023 song by NLE Choppa from Cottonwood 2
- "Habits", a 1996 song by No Knife from Drunk on the Moon
- "Habits", a 2022 song by PUP from The Unraveling of PUPTheBand
- "Habits", a 2006 song by Tomi Swick from Stalled Out in the Doorway
- "Habits", a 1965 song by The Wailing Wailers with Junior Braithwaite
- "Habits", a 2025 song by OsamaSon from Psykotic

== Science and technology ==
- HABIT (HabitAbility: Brine, Irradiation and Temperature), an instrument designed to harvest water from the Mars atmosphere
- Habit (biology), aspects of behaviour or structure
- Crystal habit, the characteristic external shape of an individual crystal
- Drug habit, drug addiction

== Other uses ==
- Habit Burger & Grill, an American restaurant chain
- Habit, Kentucky, a place in the United States
- Habit evidence, a term used in the law of evidence

== See also ==
- Bad Habit (disambiguation)
- Bad Habits (disambiguation)
- Habitus (disambiguation)
- Habitat, the type of natural environment in which a particular species of organism lives
- Habituation, a form of non-associative learning
- Habitica, formerly HabitRPG, an online task management application
- Addiction
