= Bad Habits =

Bad habits are negative behaviour patterns.

Bad Habits may also refer to:

== Film and television ==
- Bad Habits (2007 film), a Mexican film
- Bad Habits (2009 film), an Australian horror film
- "Bad Habits" (The Bill), a television episode
- "Bad Habits" (Pushing Daisies), a television episode

== Music ==
=== Albums ===
- Bad Habits (Billy Field album) or the title song, 1981
- Bad Habits (Colin James album) or the title song, 1995
- Bad Habits (Every Avenue album), 2011
- Bad Habits (The Monks album) or the title song, 1979
- Bad Habits (Nav album), 2019

=== Songs ===
- "Bad Habits" (Billy Field song), 1981
- "Bad Habits" (Ed Sheeran song), 2021
- "Bad Habits" (Jenny Burton song), 1985
- "Bad Habits" (Maxwell song), 2009
- "Bad Habits" (The Last Shadow Puppets song), 2016
- "Bad Habits" (Usher song), 2020
- "Bad Habits", by Between the Buried and Me from Colors II, 2021
- "Bad Habits", by Brass Knuckles, 2012
- "Bad Habits", by Cravity from Season 3. Hideout: Be Our Voice, 2020
- "Bad Habits", by Danny Jones, 2019
- "Bad Habits", by Delaney Jane, 2018
- "Bad Habits", by Dune Rats from Hurry Up and Wait, 2020
- "Bad Habits", by General Fiasco from Unfaithfully Yours, 2012
- "Bad Habits", by Kottonmouth Kings from Fire It Up, 2004
- "Bad Habits", by Noga Erez, 2018
- "Bad Habits", by Shaun, 2019
- "Bad Habits", by Silverstein from A Beautiful Place to Drown, 2020
- "Bad Habits", by Thin Lizzy from Thunder and Lightning, 1983

== Other media ==
- Bad Habits (play), a 1974 play by Terrence McNally
- Bad Habits, a 2008 BBC Radio 4 show featuring Richard Herring
- Bad Habits, a 2006 collection of the comic strip The Duplex by Glenn McCoy
- "Bad Habits", a short story by Joyce Carol Oates in her 2007 collection The Museum of Dr. Moses

== See also ==
- Bad Habit (disambiguation)
- Habit (disambiguation)
