= Wendy Wood =

Wendy Wood may refer to:

- Wendy Wood (artist) (1892–1981), Scottish artist and independence campaigner
- Wendy Wood (psychologist), American social psychologist
- Wendy Wood (tennis) (born 1964), American professional tennis player

== See also ==
- Wendy Woods, South African activist
