= Flash fire =

Sudden, intense fire caused by the ignition of flammable substances in the air

A flash fire is a sudden, intense fire caused by ignition of a mixture of air and a dispersed flammable substance such as a solid (including dust), flammable or combustible liquid (such as an aerosol or fine mist), or a flammable gas. It is characterized by high temperature, short duration, and a rapidly moving flame front.

== Definition ==
A flash fire is defined by NFPA 2112 (Standard on Flame-Resistant Clothing for Protection of Industrial Personnel Against Short-Duration Thermal Exposures from Fire) as:

A type of short-duration fire that spreads by means of a flame front rapidly through a diffuse fuel, such as dust, gas, or the vapors of an ignitable liquid, without the production of damaging pressure.

== Characterization ==
Flash fires may occur in environments where fuel, typically flammable gas or dust, is mixed with air in concentrations suitable for combustion.

In a flash fire, the flame spreads at subsonic velocity, so the overpressure damage is usually negligible and the bulk of the damage comes from the thermal radiation and secondary fires. When inhaled, the heated air resulting from a flash fire can cause serious damage to the tissue of the lungs, possibly leading to death by asphyxiation. Flash fires can lead to smoke burns.

Flash fire is a particular danger in enclosed spaces, as even a relatively small fire can consume enough oxygen and produce enough smoke to cause death of the persons present, whether by asphyxiation or by smoke inhalation.

Protective clothing made of fire-retardant materials (e.g. Nomex) reduces or prevents thermal injury in the body areas that are covered by the fire-retardant material. Even normal clothing can provide partial protection.

== Surgical ==
Small flash fires can occur in the operating room during surgery where the presence of ignition sources such as electrical instruments or lasers, an oxygen-rich environment, and flammable vapors (e.g. alcohol-based disinfectants) may set the stage for such an accident. While apparently smaller fires go unreported, surgical flash fires have led to burn injuries and fatalities.

Incidents of surgical fires are "significantly under-reported", according to The Joint Commission. More than half of surgical fires happen inside a patient's airway or on the patient's upper body; around 10 percent of surgical fires actually happen within the body cavity, and a quarter of surgical fires happen on other parts of the body. About 70 percent are ignited by electrosurgical tools commonly known as Bovies, devices that use a high-frequency electric current to cut tissue or stop bleeding. 20 percent of fires are sparked by hot wires, light sources, burrs or defibrillators. Another 10 percent are touched off by lasers.

As far as the patients are concerned, some recover with scars and emotional damage. Some die from burns and smoke inhalation.

== See also ==
- 1996 Garley Building fire
- Air Canada Flight 797
- Apollo 1
- Boiling liquid expanding vapor explosion
- Explosion
- Flash flood
- Flashover
- Fuel-air explosive
- Magazine detonation
- The Station nightclub fire
- Trench effect
