= Deer Hunter =

A deer hunter is a person who hunts deer for meat and sport, and, formerly, for producing buckskin hides.

Deer Hunter or variants can also refer to:

- Deer Hunter (series), a series of hunting video games
- The Deer Hunter, a 1978 film which won the Academy Award for Best Picture
- The Deer Hunter (novel), a 1979 novelization of the screenplay of the film
- The Dear Hunter, a band from Boston, Massachusetts
- "The Deer Hunter" (The Blacklist), a 2015 television episode
- "The Deer Hunters", an episode of Gilmore Girls
- Deerhunter, an indie rock band from Atlanta
