= Robespierre (disambiguation) =

Maximilien Robespierre (1758–1794) was a prominent French lawyer during the French Revolution.

- Consider reading the article on him in simple English.

Robespierre may also refer to:

- Robespierre station, a Paris Metro station in the suburb of Montreuil
- Robespierre Monument, a monument to Robespierre in Moscow

== People with the surname ==
- Augustin Robespierre (1763–1794), French lawyer, politician and brother of Maximilien
- Charlotte de Robespierre (1760–1834), French memoirist and sister of Maximilien
- Gillian Robespierre (born 1978), American film director and writer

== See also ==
- Robespierre Prize, a Swedish cultural award
- Team Robespierre, an American band
