= Debtors Anonymous =

Twelve-step program for compulsive debt

- Founded: 1976
- Location: Needham, Massachusetts
- Region served: Argentina, Australia, Bali, Brazil, Canada, Central America, France, Germany, Iran, Ireland, Japan, Mexico, New Zealand, Russia, Spain, United Kingdom, United States, and more.
- Website: debtorsanonymous.org
- Formerly called: Penny Pinchers, Capital Builders

Debtors Anonymous (D.A.) is a twelve-step program for people who want to stop incurring unsecured debt. Collectively they attend more than 500 weekly meetings in fifteen countries, according to data released in 2011. Those who compulsively incur unsecured debt are said to be engaged in compulsive borrowing and are known as compulsive debtors.

D.A. encourages careful record keeping and monitoring of finances—including purchases, income, and debt payments—to get a clear picture of spending habits. This information is used to develop healthier spending practices, supporting one in keeping a reasonable quality of life while still repaying debt. Similarly, D.A. recommends developing plans for the future to increase income.

D.A.'s program is intended to facilitate a progressive personality change in its members, ultimately transforming their world views and changing their behaviors.

In the mid-1990s, sociologist Terrell A. Hayes conducted in-depth interviews with a convenience and snowball sample of forty-six members of D.A. Hayes found many of the members interviewed only partially accept the ideology of the organization and that parts of D.A.'s program, such as stigmatizing labels used to describe members, may actually hinder acceptance of D.A.'s ideology.

== Development ==
In 1968, members of Alcoholics Anonymous (AA) who believed that their financial difficulties were caused by an addictive disease not unlike alcoholism founded an organization named Penny Pinchers, which they later renamed Capital Builders. The founding members believed their financial problems stemmed from an inability to save money, and they practiced making daily deposits to their savings accounts. Later they recognized their problems were not caused by an inability to save but rather an inability to stay solvent.

In early 1971, the group members came to believe that incurring unsecured debt was the threshold of their disease and committed to a rigorous twelve-step approach to prevent incurring further unsecured debt. The original group disbanded and meetings were not consistently held again until 1976, when a group of two or three people began meeting regularly on Wednesdays in the rectory of St. Stephen's Church in New York City. Within a year, a second group formed and Debtors Anonymous continued to grow. The first General Service Conference was held in 1987 in the auditorium at Saint Vincent's Catholic Medical Center in Manhattan. In 2009, there were 512 groups meeting worldwide.

== Literature ==
D.A. adapted AA's format, making only five changes to AA's Twelve Steps and Twelve Traditions: "D.A." and "Debtors Anonymous" replaces "AA" and "Alcoholics Anonymous", "debt" replaces "alcoholism", "compulsive debtors" replaces "alcoholics", "incurring unsecured debt" replaces "drinking", and "debtor" replaces "alcoholic." In 2002, D.A. published a list of 12 promises similar to the 12 promises appearing on pages 83–84 of Alcoholics Anonymous. D.A.'s original literature also includes the Twelve Tools of Debtors Anonymous, a list of practices to recover from compulsive getting into debt.

Official D.A. literature is either approved by the D.A. General Service Board (GSB) or by vote at a D.A. annual World Service Conference, based on whether it is service literature (related to the functioning of D.A. groups) or recovery literature (all other D.A. literature). Such literature is "Conference-approved."

D.A. publications include the books, A Currency of Hope, The Twelve Steps, Twelve Traditions, and Twelve Concepts of Debtors Anonymous, and Debtors Anonymous Twelve Steps Study Guide for D.A. and B.D.A., as well as several pamphlets. A Currency of Hope includes D.A.'s adaptations of the Twelve Steps and Twelve Traditions, a description of compulsive getting into debt, a brief history of D.A., and 38 stories written by D.A. members explaining how D.A. has affected their lives.

== Membership ==
Debtors Anonymous is fundamentally an organization to facilitate recovery from "compulsive debting." "Compulsive debting" is a neologism described variously in D.A. literature as a disorder, progressive illness, and a disease. As such, "compulsive debting" cannot be cured, although it can be arrested. Compulsive debtors are those who cannot control their debt, as a consequence their debt causes growing and continuing problems in their lives. "Compulsive debting" is also an umbrella term encompassing many different types of behavior from "incurring unsecured debt to compulsive shopping, from grandiose thinking to deprivation mentality." Members must decide for themselves whether or not they are compulsive debtors. To help them with the decision, D.A. provides a 15-item questionnaire (most compulsive debtors will answer yes to eight or more of the questions) and a list of 12 signs of "compulsive debting". An ethnographic study of D.A. members found they attributed the causes of "compulsive debting" to family maladjustment and a culture that constantly pressures people to spend money.

D.A. members may identify themselves additionally—or more specifically—as compulsive shoppers or spenders, codependent debtors or compulsive underearners. Compulsive spending is a symptom associated with "compulsive debting". Spending money to one's detriment is compulsive spending. Spending money on particular goods or services after making a decision not to, or having a desire not to, is also compulsive spending. Compulsive spending is often done to avoid uncomfortable feelings. D.A. provides a 30-item questionnaire to help people determine if they are spending compulsively, each item is a sign of compulsive spending. Answering yes to three or more of these questions indicates compulsive spending. Although compulsive spenders may not actually be in debt, if they have a desire to avoid incurring unsecured debt, they are welcome in D.A. Codependent debtors incur unsecured debt to pay for another persons' compulsive spending.

Underearners are people with viable skills who are psychologically incapable of earning enough money to support themselves without incurring unsecured debt. D.A. provides a list of 12 signs that are symptomatic of compulsive underearning. Underearning can lead to become a "compulsive pauper," a term describing people who are consistently broke and in financial crisis. A related term, "financial anorexia," describes "someone who takes inordinate amounts of pride in having few financial needs and is more comfortable living in deprivation." Financial anorexics, while they may find it difficult to spend money on themselves, are not necessarily underearning. Although compulsive underearners may not actually be in debt, if they have a desire to avoid incurring unsecured debt, they are welcome in D.A.

=== Psychiatric categorization ===
In the previous version of the American Psychiatric Association's diagnostic manual (DSM-IV-TR) and in the current version (DSM-V), indebtedness is not considered to be a disease. Neither version contains compulsive buying disorder, a condition similar to "compulsive debting", or any other spending-related issues as diagnostic categories. The DSM-IV-TR did contain a category for Impulse Control Disorders Not Otherwise Specified to diagnose impulse control problems that were not elsewhere in the manual.

== Terminology ==
The phrase "terminal vagueness" describes a characteristic of compulsive debtors, a systematic avoidance of monitoring finances–including avoiding communication with creditors–leading to an overestimation or underestimation of account balances. An overestimation may result in incurring unsecured debt. "Clarity" is the opposite of vagueness, requiring a clear picture of how much money one has and owes, at any given time. D.A. encourages "awareness" of the cultural pervasiveness of debt and overspending. D.A. suggests members stay aware of manipulative advertising tactics as well as thoughts and feelings that trigger their desire to spend money.

Excessive preoccupation with indebtedness can lead to both "emotional indebtedness" and "self-debting." "Self-debting" is the inability to identify or fulfill personal needs because of such preoccupations, whereas emotional indebtedness is the accompanying stress, anxiety, feelings of hopelessness or despair, and even suicidal ideation. "Self-debting" manifests in various ways such as taking drastic measures to hide evidence of problems with money or debt, paying creditors to the detriment of one's needs, or even spending excessive amounts of time managing finances.

"Abstinence" in D.A. is abstaining from incurring any new unsecured debt, which includes not paying bills when due, borrowing money from a family member or friend without collateral, credit card debt and other unsecured loans. If a member has abstained from incurring unsecured debt for a day, he or she is "solvent" for that day. Solvency, in this sense, is a neologism differing from the common definition of solvency (the degree to which assets exceeds liabilities).

A belief in an "abundant universe" underlies much of the D.A. program. Competition is learned from, but not feared, as there are enough resources for everyone. This perspective counters deprivation thinking that accompanies "compulsive debting", overspending, and underearning.

D.A. members may be vague or unfocused about their goals in life. For this reason, D.A. encourages members to develop "vision," the ability to form a clear and specific picture of what they want to do in life. Visions are discovered by abstaining from incurring unsecured debt, following the Twelve Steps and using the Twelve Tools. Ignoring one's vision is similar to "self-debting", it may result in physical or emotional distress, or preoccupation with other people's lives rather than focusing on oneself.

Self-help groups, including D.A., urge members to change their world view. It is critically important for self-help groups to ease this process for their members as changes in world view are generally accompanied by significant behavioral changes. For example, the pamphlet Debtors Anonymous answers "How Does a Person Get Solvent Through the D.A. Program?" by explaining that D.A. brings about a "progressive personality change" within the member. This change is accomplished through faith in, and understanding of, D.A.'s Twelve Steps.

== Record keeping and planning ==
=== Spending records and spending plans ===
"Keeping numbers" is a daily practice that requires recording each cent owed, spent and earned, including recording any part of a debt that has been paid. Members use different methods to keep their numbers, a simple approach is to carry a small notebook and record numbers in it daily. Daily records are used to create monthly spending records with income and expenditures separated into specific categories (e.g. rent, groceries, phone, entertainment, etc.). The purpose of these records is to increase clarity, cutting through any denial about how much money is being earned and spent. A detailed spending record will show values, habits and responsibilities.

Spending records are used to create spending plans. A spending plan is essentially a list of all goods and services to buy in a given month. Members regularly review their spending plans and assess whether items and amounts in the plan are reasonable. The spending plan puts the member's needs ahead of the creditors and should not cause one to incur unsecured debt. Spending plans should include categories for income and debt repayment. Unless one is having trouble meeting very basic needs, it should also include a category for savings.

Accompanying a "real" spending plan is an "ideal" spending plan, detailing what one's finances would look like in an ideal universe, how much money one would earn, and how it would be spent. The ideal spending plan focuses efforts on increasing income and following a vision for the future. D.A. avoids using the term budget, as its connotation may imply rigid categories. A spending plan is designed such that one has the best possible life under their present financial circumstances. Spending plans are flexible and convey that there are options, that one chooses how to spend money.

=== Action plans ===
D.A. encourages members to organize "pressure relief meetings." In these meetings, a newer member invites two veteran members (with at least 90 days of abstinence) to review his or her financial records in detail and give practical advice. These occur outside of regular meetings, and are a way for members to receive suggestions from each other. The member organizing the group typically brings his or her spending records, and a list of issues that he or she would like assistance with.

"Action plans" are developed during pressure relief meetings based on the suggestions of the other members, a spending plan may also be developed or modified. Actions plans are lists of specific actions to resolve debts and improve one's financial situation. Members are encouraged to organize pressure relief groups monthly or at least every three months. In times of crisis, however, they may hold them more often.

=== Debt repayment plans ===
Practicing the Fourth Step of the D.A.'s Twelve Steps includes not only a moral inventory of personal characteristics but also an inventory of personal financial history including a list of current outstanding debts. Similarly, the Ninth Step includes monetary debt repayment. Following the language of the Ninth Step, however, the payment schedule should not injure the debtor or the creditor. The goal in repaying creditors is to do so while living well. D.A. members find their ability to pay their creditors improves when they take care of themselves. Payments to creditors should be consistent and manageable. In this way, members are able to offer detailed rationale for their debt repayment schedule, allowing for empowered and functional negotiation with creditors. In this spirit, a certain amount of money is allocated for debt repayment each month whenever possible.

One might begin making a debt repayment plan by categorizing secured and unsecured debt, including the name of the creditor, the total amount owed, when the amount will be paid off, and the current monthly payment. For each debt one would list the current balance, finance charge per month, the minimum payment per month, and include a blank column for the "actual" payment. The amount of the actual payment would be determined from one's spending plan, after subtracting necessary expenses and the amount of money required to support a reasonable quality of life. This amount would then be divided up among the creditors. Ideally, the payment to each creditor is proportional (based on the amount of money owed to the creditor divided by the total liabilities). Creditors should not be given special treatment because they harass a debtor with greater frequency than other creditors. One may, however, give preference to creditors charging higher interest rates, threatening legal action, or who are friends or family members.

D.A. recommends recording each payment made to a creditor, noting the original amount of the debt, the date the payment was made, the amount of the payment, and the remaining balance. Further, D.A. advises keeping a record of retired debts to record the date each debt was fully paid.

Although it may conflict with cultural norms, D.A. recommends taking a debt moratorium when a debtor cannot put his or her needs first and continue to making debt payments. Before taking a debt moratorium, DA suggests checking with one's sponsor, pressure relief group, and to contact one's creditors to explain the situation. If a creditor threatens to take legal action under these circumstances D.A. recommends seeking professional assistance or revising the moratorium.

== Analysis of interviews with members ==
In an independent study using convenience and snowball sampling, sociologist Terrell A. Hayes found and surveyed 46 D.A. members from July 1993 to June 1995. 42 of the members surveyed were attending meetings in the Eastern United States, the remaining four attended meetings in Austin, Texas. An analysis of the data Hayes collected revealed specific parts of D.A. hindered acceptance of D.A.'s overall ideology. These included: labeling, differences between D.A. meetings and D.A. members, lack of a clear position on bankruptcy and debt-shifting, and common use of unapproved literature.

=== Labeling ===
Hayes performed a qualitative analysis of survey results in an attempt to understand how labeling theory applies to the stigma of indebtedness. He found that social labeling (labeling of members by other people) and self-labeling (members labeling themselves) is a widespread practice in twelve-step groups, and pointed out that the First Step in D.A. requires one to admit powerlessness over debt. Hayes concluded that labeling was related to changes in self-awareness, encouraging members to seek help and to changes in their social identity. However he also asserted that stigmatization of indebtedness was related to experiences of shame among indebted people, and that labeling a person as having a problem with debt therefore exposes them to shame.

Other mental health professionals have argued that D.A. participation reduces shame, and some, such as Law Professor A. Michele Dickerson suggested that something like Debtors Anonymous may be a useful addition to debtor education precisely because it would add a guilt-based component to the curriculum. The stigmatization would, Dickerson argues, change the debtor's economic philosophy and reduce the likelihood of impulse buying.

=== Differences between D.A. meetings and D.A. members ===
Hayes' analysis found differences between D.A. meetings and D.A. members. D.A.'s pamphlet Meetings states "regular attendance at meetings is an important part of recovery–it is vital for compulsive debtors–and especially for newcomers." Differences between D.A. meetings and D.A. members at the same meeting can, however, hinder one in adopting a new world view. As D.A.'s practices are only suggested and not required, one may pick and choose which parts of D.A. to adhere to or follow. This approach, however, is tolerated to different degrees within different groups. A group's rigidity or flexibility related to D.A.'s suggested practices may hinder identification with the group. Recognition of individual differences, specifically that some members are better role models than others and the inability to identify with experiences of other members, interferes with the world view transformation process.

=== Bankruptcy and debt-shifting ===
Hayes' analysis also noted issues with the way that bankruptcy and debt-shifting are addressed. D.A.'s pamphlet, Debt Payment, explains that bankruptcy is an "outside issue," an issue on which D.A. has no opinion. The pamphlet elaborates, however, that some D.A. members found bankruptcy only provided a "quick fix" and did not correct the underlying issues causing them to incur unsecured debt. The pamphlet also notes other D.A. members believe bankruptcy is a proper course of action in some situations. Debt-shifting is the practice of transferring debt from one creditor to another in order to get a lower interest rate or otherwise make it easier to repay the debt. Debt-shifting is not discussed in official D.A. literature, although it is discussed in an unofficial auxiliary book based on D.A. principles. Because D.A. does not take an official position on bankruptcy and debt-shifting, some groups take stronger positions on these topics than others which can alienate potential members.

=== Unapproved literature ===
Hayes found that the use of unapproved literature in D.A. groups has been a source of conflict among members. D.A. suggests studying AA literature in addition to D.A. literature to gain a better understanding of addictive diseases. Specifically, D.A. endorses the use of the Twelve Steps and Twelve Traditions and Alcoholics Anonymous (also known as the "Big Book"). D.A.'s pamphlet on the use of AA literature and the book The Twelve Steps, Twelve Traditions, and Twelve Concepts of Debtors Anonymous states that D.A. does not endorse any literature except that which has been Conference-approved.

== Parallel organizations ==
Debtors Anonymous groups, independent of those already meeting in New York, were formed in the late 1970s by the National Council of Negro Women (NCNW) in New York City. They began as a group of 37 participants who had attended credit education classes at the NCNW offices. The NCNW Debtors Anonymous members had four goals: (1) Develop individual budgets and report regularly at group meetings on progress and problems; (2) Select and work with a buddy for mutual support and as a safeguard against spending urges; (3) Educate themselves and fellow members about credit costs, consumer protection laws, and the best prices of goods and services; (4) Set long-term goals and stick with them. Meetings were designed to share information on where to get common products at the best price (clothes, home furnishings, small appliances, food, etc.). Group sharing would usually begin after a member gave a short presentation on a topic she had researched for the meeting. Additional groups were formed supported with grants from Chase Manhattan Bank and the United States Department of Education's consumer education unit. In 1981 there were chapters in nine major US cities.

In response to the 1994 economic crisis in Mexico an anti-government organization naming itself the National Association of Debtors Anonymous formed. Later, this group merged with El Barzón (a movement of land-owning farmers against the Mexican government).

== See also ==
- Compulsive buying disorder
- List of twelve-step groups
- List of Twelve Step alternate wordings
- Underemployment
- Jerrold Mundis
