= Black Marble =

American music project

- Origin: Brooklyn, New York, U.S.
- Genres: Cold wave; synth-pop
- Years active: 2011–present
- Labels: Hardly Art; Ghostly International; Sacred Bones
- Members: Chris Stewart
- Past members: Ty Kube Max Deemz (live)
- Website: blackmarble.bandcamp.com

Black Marble is an American music project formed in 2011 in Brooklyn, New York. It is led by electronic musician Chris Stewart and formerly featured Ty Kube of Team Robespierre.

== History ==
Black Marble began in March 2011, officially releasing their debut EP on Hardly Art titled Weight Against the Door in 2012. Also in 2012, Black Marble released its first full-length album on Hardly Art titled A Different Arrangement. These works were described as "throwbacks to the cold-wave genre" by Leo Neufeld of the Miami New Times.

In 2016, Black Marble released its second full-length album, titled It's Immaterial. It was released on Ghostly International. The album marked Ty Kube's departure from the project and Chris Stewart's move from the East to the West Coast. Kristin Porter of SLUG said Stewart "keeps the band's Brooklyn, New York–synth roots alive, resulting in a collection of songs with amplified vocals, pastel-colored synths and a hint of modern-day deference, which is evocatively scored by Stewart's personal, nostalgic touch coupled with every happy-sad, Ian Curtis–garage dance party you've never been to."

On July 25, 2019, the band announced that its third studio album, Bigger Than Life, would be released on October 25 through Sacred Bones Records. The record's first single, "One Eye Open", was released along with the announcement.

In October 2019, Black Marble released the music video to their latest album song, "Private Show".

On October 22, 2021, Black Marble released their fourth studio album, Fast Idol. Sophie Kemp of Pitchfork saw the "enjoyable, sexy record" as leaning on 1980s electronic influences such as New Order and OMD.

== Members ==
- Chris Stewart - vocals, bass, guitar, synthesizer (2011–present)

Former members

- Ty Kube - keyboards, synthesizer (2011–2016)

== Discography ==
=== Studio albums ===
- A Different Arrangement (2012, Hardly Art)
- It's Immaterial (2016, Ghostly International)
- Bigger Than Life (2019, Sacred Bones Records)
- Fast Idol (2021, Sacred Bones Records)
- Life in Small Spaces (2026, Sacred Bones Records)

=== EPs ===
- Weight Against the Door (2012, Hardly Art)
- I Must Be Living Twice (2020, Sacred Bones Records)
