= Recklessness (psychology) =

Disregard for dangers

Recklessness (also called unchariness) is disregard for or indifference to the dangers of a situation or for the consequences of one's actions, as in deciding to act without stopping to think beforehand. Aristotle considered such rashness as one end (excessive) of a continuum, with courage as the mean and cowardice as the deficit vice. Recklessness has been linked to antisocial personality disorder.

== Origins ==
"Reck" is a regard or reckoning, particularly of a situation. A reckless individual would engage in an activity without concern for its after-effects. It can in certain cases be seen as heroic—for example, the soldier fearlessly charging into battle, with no care for his own safety, has a revered status and military rank among some. However, recklessness is more commonly regarded as a vice—this same soldier may be a liability to his own side, or get himself killed for no benefit—and may be the product of a death wish.

== Motivation ==
The driving-force behind recklessness may be a need to test fate—an attempt to bolster a sense of omnipotence or of special privileges.

Or it may be due to a loss of the feeling of anxiety, to a denial of it, or to an attempt to overcompensate for it.

Similarly dare-devils may overcompensate for an inhibited aggressiveness, while narcissists may enjoy a feeling that nothing can happen to them, similar to what Aristotle termed the maniac.

== See also ==
- Acting out
- Bad habit
- Counterphobic attitude
- Gamification
- Impulsivity
- Negligence
- Recklessness (law)
- Russian Roulette
