= Oxford Circus fire =

1984 fire in London, United Kingdom

Coordinates: 51.5154°N 0.1425°W

A fire occurred on 23 November 1984 at Oxford Circus tube station on the London Underground. Oxford Circus station, located in the heart of London's shopping district, is served by three deep-level tube lines: the Bakerloo line, Central line and Victoria line. The three lines are linked by a complex network of tunnels and cross-passages which all converge to a common booking hall situated beneath the junction of Oxford Street and Regent Street.

The fire started in a materials store at the south end of the northbound Victoria line platform, which was being used by contractors working on the modernisation of the station. It gutted the northbound Victoria line platform tunnel and the passages leading off it. The adjacent northbound Bakerloo line platform suffered smoke damage, as did the escalator tunnel and the booking hall. Other areas of the station were undamaged. The most likely cause of the fire was a smoker discarding smoking materials through a ventilation grille into the materials store, which ignited rags or paint thinner.

== Discovery ==
At 9:50 p.m., a station inspector, on duty in the mezzanine level, was told by a passenger of smoke on the northbound Victoria line platform. He took a piece of wood with him down to the platform, expecting to deal with something smouldering on the track. When he saw that it was the contractors' storage area on fire, he tried to use a telephone in a kiosk nearby, but opening the door of the kiosk released thick smoke that drove him back. He then retreated and started the evacuation.

== Evacuation ==
Oxford Circus station was rapidly evacuated when the fire was discovered, and the London Fire Brigade conducted a sweep of the station which confirmed that all passengers were clear. The fire alert disrupted the routes of 10 trains on the three lines: passengers on six of the trains were evacuated at stations and passengers on four trains were escorted down the running tunnels to adjacent stations. The last passenger evacuated from these trains left the track at 12:45 a.m.. 30 pumps attended the fire, which was declared extinguished just before 3 a.m. the next day.

== Injuries ==
No one was killed as a result of the fire; 14 people (four passengers, one police officer and nine members of London Underground staff) were taken to hospital for smoke inhalation, of whom all but one were released next day.

== Reconstruction ==
The gutted areas of the station had to be completely reconstructed, which in the case of the Victoria line platform tunnel involved sealing the ends so that the waterproof lining of the platform tunnel could be removed without releasing asbestos fibres into the atmosphere of the Underground. The removal took just over three weeks. Passenger services were restarted on the Central line the following morning. Northbound Bakerloo line trains were not permitted to stop at the station until 30 November, by which time the access tunnels to the Bakerloo northbound platform had been cleared of fire damage.

== Effects on services ==
Victoria line service through central London and to the station recommenced on 17 December, with the platform tunnel having been stripped of all fittings down to the tunnel segment rings. Wooden hoardings were erected at the rear of the platform and the entire platform tunnel was whitewashed. Reconstruction of the decorative fittings on the platform was not completed until early 1986.

== Smoking bans ==
Whilst smoking had been banned on London Underground trains since July 1984, at the time of the Oxford Circus fire it was still allowed in stations. In response to the fire, a complete ban on smoking in all physically underground stations was introduced in February 1985.

Nonetheless, a similar incident occurred on 18 November 1987 at King's Cross St Pancras tube station when it was concluded as probable that a passenger had dropped a lit match onto an escalator. The resulting fire killed 31 people. After the King's Cross fire, staff training was increased and the smoking ban was enforced much more strictly with fines being introduced for offenders.
