= Jerrold Mundis =

American financial counselor (1941–2020)

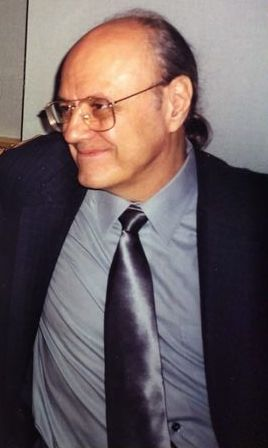
Jerry Mundis

Jerrold J. Mundis (March 3, 1941 – April 4, 2020) was an American author, speaker, and counselor. He wrote on a wide variety of topics including fiction, nonfiction, film novelization, and children's literature. He wrote about money management, including on topics like debt reduction and income growth. He published as a ghostwriter and under multiple pseudonyms, including Eric Corder, E. Corder, E. M. Corder, Jerry Mundis, Julia Withers.

As E.M. Corder, Mundis wrote a novelization of the 1978 film The Deer Hunter, winner in the Best Picture and Best Director categories at the 51st Academy Awards.

Mundis died from complications of COVID-19 in Manhattan on April 4, 2020, at the age of 79.

== Early life ==
Mundis was born March 3, 1941, in Chicago, Illinois. He was the son of Dolores Mundis of Bethesda, Maryland, and James M. Mundis, a Kansas native and WWII Navy veteran. His father was a journalist and public relations director who worked for AT&T as its director of news and public relations before retiring in the early 1980s. Jerrold was the middle child between his two siblings, Tom Mundis and Donna Field.

Mundis attended Beloit College from 1959 through 1961. In 1963, he received a B.A. from New York University. He married and raised two sons in the Catskills before moving to Greenwich Village in New York City.

== Writing career ==
Mundis wrote both fiction and non-fiction, including ghostwritten books, and some 100 short stories, essays, and articles in publications such as the New York Times Magazine, Harper's Weekly and American Heritage.

Mundis wrote 13 books of nonfiction, particularly How To Get Out Of Debt, Stay Out Of Debt & Live Prosperously, Earn what You Deserve: How to Stop Underearning & Start Thriving, and Making Peace With Money.

In Earn What You Deserve, a book on under-earning, he provides an approach to compulsive behavior regarding spending and handling financial matters beginning with "three cardinal rules: do not incur debt, do not take work that pays less than you require, and do not say 'no' to money." Other Mundis titles include "How to Have More Money," 'How to Cope with Credit Cards," and "How to Create Savings."

Mundis wrote 17 novels, including Gerhardt's Children which the New York Times described as "a tricky narrative to bring off, involving as it does many centrifugal lives, but Mr. Mundis brings it off." About "The Retreat" in 1985, Publishers Weekly said, "It’s a new experience in salvation...Striking and bizarre...not for the squeamish or devout."

Under the pseudonym Eric Corder, Mundis wrote the five-volume Shame and Glory saga about the American slave trade. The series included the books Slave Ship, Slave, The Long Tattoo, Hell Bottom, and Running Dogs. As Corder, he also wrote a non-fiction book, Prelude to Civil War: Kansas-Missouri, 1854–61, recounting the Bleeding Kansas affair from both the pro-slavery and free-soil points of view, beginning with the Kansas-Nebraska Act of 1854. As Julia Withers, Mundis wrote Echo in a Dark Wind, a neo-gothic novel published in 1966.

His novel The Dogs, written under the pseudonym Robert Calder, was the subject of an interview by Terry Gross on Fresh Air on May 26, 1976. Several other works by Mundis about canines include ghost-written training books about "a celebrated collie" (Lassie). He also wrote The Dog Book, featuring writing by Doris Lessing, E.B. White, Edward Hoagland, William Cowper, John Burroughs, and John Steinbeck.

His work also includes the drama King of the Ice Cream Mountain, a one-act play for children., co-written with a partner in 1968.

Also in 1968, Mundis wrote Mystery of the Whale Tattoo, the forty-seventh volume in the The Hardy Boys series of mystery books for children and teens for the Stratemeyer Syndicate.

As E.M. Corder, Mundis wrote a novelization of the 1978 film The Deer Hunter, the Best Picture and Best Director winner at the 51st Academy Awards. Mundis, as Corder, also wrote the novelization Citizen's Band, for the 1977 comedy film "Handle with Care," directed by Jonathan Demme. The film was later edited and re-released under the new title.

== Public Speaking ==
Mundis spoke regularly on debt and personal money for many professional societies and associations, including such organizations as the US Customs and Border Protection, the National Education Association and Unity Church. A recovered "debtor" himself, he was intimately familiar with the success of the Debtors Anonymous program.

== Debting and Underearning "Suggestions" ==
With his focus on "gaining happier relationships with money" as a writer and public speaker, he was recognized in Debtors Anonymous' 12-step Fellowship (founded in 1971) for helping others and providing mindful introductions to the recovery movement while adhering to its traditions and suggestions.

Mundis framed money relations as a societal problem: "Discussion of personal finances, particularly indebtedness, may be the last American taboo.”

He described a need for help in this area as normal. "There are doctors and lawyers... house painters, university professors, carpenters, psychologists, nurses, secretaries, executives, artists, writers, actors, stock clerks and stockbrokers." But, "They often feel helpless, angry and confused. They become fearful, depressed, even suicidal. They live with a daily sense of impending disaster.”

Mundis recapped Debtor's Anonymous as an antidote to a condition that is not a moral shortcoming but a condition similar to alcoholism with a methodical solution: "An incoming member is first encouraged to avoid taking on any new debt…anyone can abstain from incurring a new debt for one day – this day."

He proposed a daily backing up of spiritual principles with concrete action. "Income is the second area of consideration, and it is usually dealt with in two stages: first, stabilizing it to match monthly expenses; second, increasing it... Although the major concern is to avoid new debt, an increase in earnings is a logical extension – by taking on a part-time job, requesting a promotion, changing jobs, or aggressively seeking new business." Finally, "Stabilization may involve seeking a moratorium from a creditor, taking in a roommate temporarily and similar options... Members are committed to repaying each of their debts in full, but only on a schedule consistent with a tolerable life."

== Recognition and awards ==
Mundis was a member of the Authors Guild, PEN American Center, and Poets & Writers. He was listed in Contemporary Authors and the Directory of American Poets & Fiction Writers. Some of his books were selected for The Book-of-the-Month Club, the Literary Guild, and the One Spirit Book Club.

Under his Robert Calder persona, Mundis won a Dog Writers Association of America award in 1977 for The Dogs. The Chicago Tribune once said of him, "One day Calder is Julia Withers, Gothic novelist the next, he's Eric Corder, black historian or Franklin W. Dixon, one of the writers who penned Hardy Boy serials. He's also Jack Lancer, creator of Chris Cool, Teen Agent." Mundis was listed in the Writer's Directory for 1980 and Contemporary Authors, Volume 69.

== Death ==
Mundis died from complications of COVID-19 in Manhattan on April 4, 2020, at the age of 79.
