= It's Immaterial (album) =

Studio album by Black Marble
- Released: October 14, 2016
- Genre: Synth-pop; coldwave
- Length: 37:16
- Label: Ghostly International
- Producer: Chris Stewart; Derek Stanton

Black Marble chronology
A Different Arrangement (2012)	It's Immaterial (2016)	Bigger Than Life (2019)

It's Immaterial is the second studio album by American electronic music project Black Marble, released on October 14, 2016 through Ghostly International record label. It is the project's first album not to feature Ty Kube, making it a solo project of the other member Chris Stewart.

== Composition and style ==
According to Drowned in Sound’s Stephen Proski, It's Immaterial combines elements of "early Eighties post-punk and synth-driven proto dream pop." AllMusic's Tim Sendra argued that the album harks back to the "gloomy, muted sound of the first record, which mixed together Stewart's disembodied vocals, Peter Hook-style basslines, janky drum machines, and synths so cold they'd freeze water." PopMatters’ Ian King thought that the record "doesn’t make any seismic adjustments to Black Marble’s era-faithful synthwave which arrived fully formed on the debut Weight Against the Door EP and full length A Different Arrangement."

== Critical reception ==
Professional ratings
Aggregate scores
Source	Rating
Metacritic	72/100
Review scores
Source	Rating
AllMusic	4/5 stars
Drowned in Sound	7/10
Earbuddy	6.3/10
PopMatters	7/10 stars
Q	3/5 stars
The Skinny	3/5 stars
Uncut	3.5/5 stars

Upon its release, It's Immaterial received positive reviews from music critics. At Metacritic, which assigns a normalized rating out of 100 to reviews from critics, the album received an average score of 72, which indicates "generally favorable reviews", based on 6 reviews. AllMusic critic Tim Sendra wrote: "Stewart is content to work on the fringes of the synth pop underground, and that's the kind of iconoclasm that makes It's Immaterial worth seeking out for fans of the sound who are sick of how omnipresent it seems." Drowned in Sound critic Stephen Proski thought that the record "keeps you floating in an undisclosed location between heaven and purgatory, spiralling with no direction." Ian King of PopMatters stated: "Without crossing too far over Black Marble’s own tastefully stark lines, It’s Immaterial allows a little more endearing color and candor." The Skinny's Joe Goggins commented that the record is "always going to feel like either an engaging listen or a frustrating one."

== Track listing ==
No.	Title	Length
1.	"Interdiction"	1:14
2.	"Iron Lung"	4:01
3.	"It's Conditional"	4:30
4.	"Woods"	3:07
5.	"A Million Billion Stars"	3:22
6.	"Missing Sibling"	1:46
7.	"Frisk"	3:34
8.	"Golden Heart"	3:25
9.	"Self Guided Tours"	3:55
10.	"Portland U"	3:40
11.	"Collene"	4:42
Total length:		37:16
