= Habitica =

Gamified online task management app

- Website type: Task management
- Available in: Multilingual
- Founded: January 30, 2013; 13 years ago
- Owners: HabitRPG, Inc.
- Founders: Tyler Renelle; Siena Leslie; Vicky Hsu
- Website: habitica.com
- Content license: GNU General Public License 3.0 (code); Creative Commons Attribution / Non-Commercial / Share-Alike 3.0 (assets and content designed for Habitica)
- Written in: JavaScript

Habitica, formerly HabitRPG, is an online task management application developed by HabitRPG, Inc. It was founded on January 30, 2013. The application uses the format of a role-playing game to organize tasks. Habitica is an open source project. It has attracted the interest of scientific research into the efficacy of habit-forming.

== Concept ==
Habitica is a self-improvement web application that uses game mechanics to assist users in structuring their behavior.

The game is laid out in the form of a RPG in which the player collects items, such as gold and armor, and gains levels to become more powerful. Rewards are achieved through maintaining real-life goals in the form of Habits, Dailies, and To-Dos.

=== Gameplay ===
In Habitica, Habits are long-term goals that are utilized to change a person's habits. These Habits can be set to either 'positive', 'negative', or both.

For example:

- A predefined Habit may be "1 hour of productive work". If a user records an hour of productive work on the Habitica app, they will gain experience and gold; this is a positive Habit.
- A predefined Habit may be "Eat junk food". If a user records eating junk food on the Habitica app, they will lose health; this is a negative Habit.
- A predefined Habit may be "Take the stairs". If a user records taking the stairs, they will gain experience and gold. If they record not taking the stairs, they will lose health; this is a positive and a negative Habit.

If a user completes a positive Habit often, it will turn green, signifying their ability to commit to their Habit. If a user performs a negative Habit often, it will start to turn red and do increasing damage to their health. When players accrue enough experience points, they gain a level, which restores their health.

Dailies are completed in a scheduled and repeatable fashion, as the player schedules these in advance. To-Dos are one-time tasks that can be added or deleted; when completed, they disappear. Unlike Habits and Dailies, these do not damage health.

== Mobile application ==
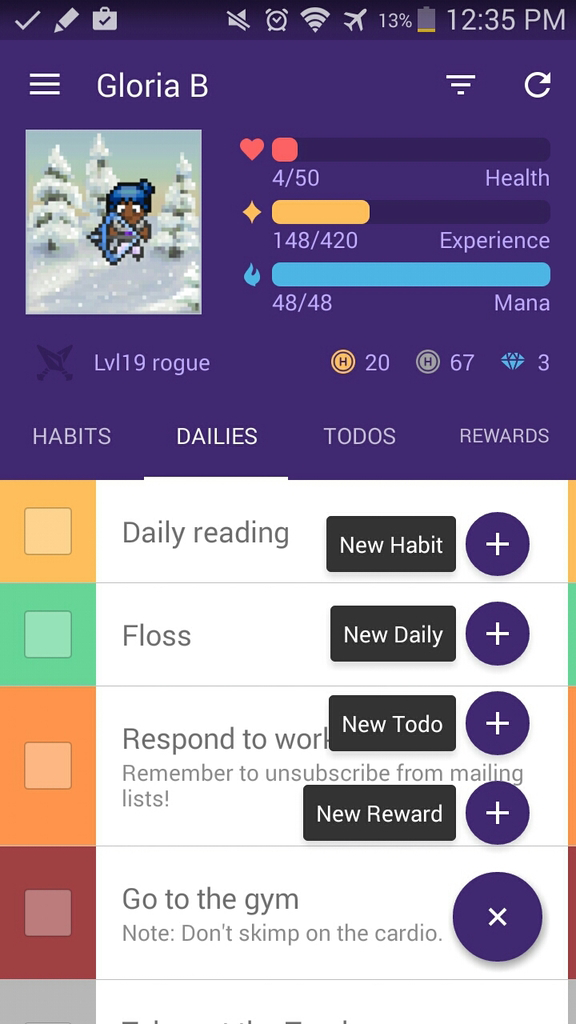
A screenshot of the Habitica Android mobile app

An official mobile application named Habitica is available for the Android and iOS operating systems. These mobile applications are replacements for the deprecated mobile apps named HabitRPG, which were released as promised after the $25,000 Kickstarter fund goal was reached.

== History ==
Tyler Renelle originally created HabitRPG to help with his own habits, having been inspired by the self-help books The Power of Habit and The Now Habit. The earliest version of HabitRPG was a Google Docs spreadsheet with color-coded cell formulae.

As the community of HabitRPG users grew, Renelle reached out to Siena Leslie and Vicky Hsu. Leslie and Hsu became co-founders of HabitRPG, Inc., which was formally incorporated as a company in 2014.

On July 31, 2015, the website and apps were renamed to Habitica, after the land where players' adventures take place. The change was made because some users found the name HabitRPG confusing or difficult to remember. The company name remained HabitRPG, Inc.

In December 2022, the moderators left after a disagreement with the staff. As a result, many recurring challenges ended. On August 8, 2023, Habitica removed the Tavern and guilds, which were their social spaces, forcing much of the community to instead use sites like Discord.

== Community ==
Community volunteers contribute to Habitica in various ways, such as by creating pixel art, translating text, creating music and sound effects, writing blog posts to promote Habitica, editing the wiki, resolving bugs, implementing new features, and answering new users' questions.

=== Kickstarter ===
Starting on January 11, 2013, Renelle started a campaign on the fund-raising site Kickstarter to improve the development of the application with a goal of $25,000. The campaign ultimately raised over $40,000.

== See also ==
- Role-playing games
- Gamification
- Motivation
- Task management software
- Serious games
