= Colin Townsley =

British firefighter

Colin Townsley GM
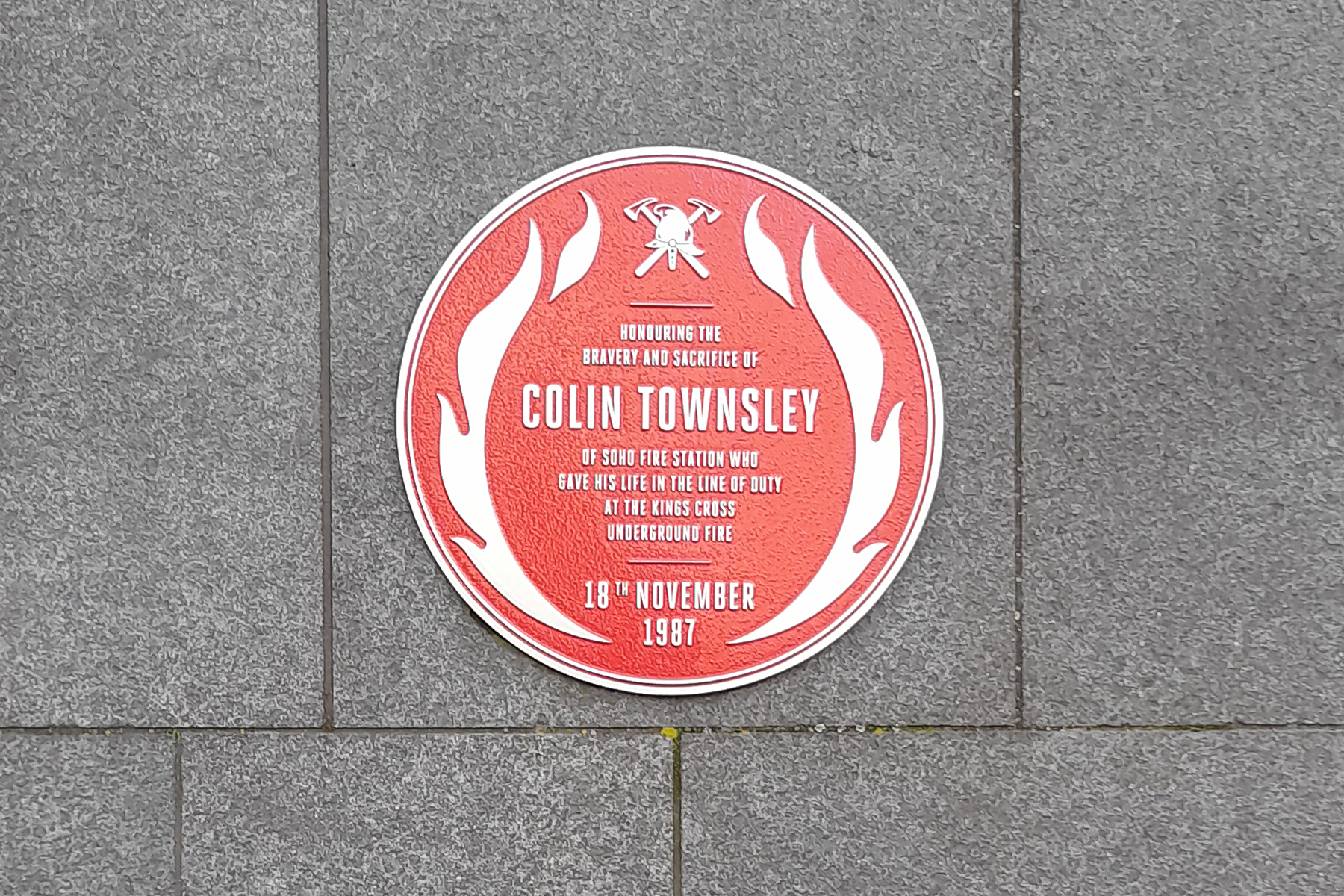
- Memorial plaque
- Born: 22 May 1942; Newton Abbot, Devon, England
- Died: 18 November 1987 (aged 45); King's Cross Station, London, England
- Cause of death: Smoke inhalation
- Monuments: King's Cross Station
- Occupations: Station Officer, Red Watch, Soho Fire Station; Firefighter
- Years active: 1964–1987
- Employer: London Fire Brigade
- Title: Station Officer
- Spouse: Linda Creese (m. 1968)
- Children: 2
- Awards: George Medal, Chief Officer’s Commendation

Colin James Townsley, GM (22 May 1942 – 18 November 1987) was an English firefighter. In 1987 Townsley was station officer in charge of Red Watch at Soho Fire Station in central London. He was one of 31 people killed in the King's Cross fire, the only firefighter to die. Townsley died from smoke inhalation while assisting passengers to escape from the fire; he was posthumously awarded the Chief Officer's Commendation and the George Medal for his bravery.

== Early and personal life ==
Townsley was born on 22 May 1942 to James and Emma Townsley in Newton Abbot, Devon. He married Linda Creese in Leicester in 1968 and they had two daughters – Sarah (b. 1969) and Sally (b. 1976).

== King's Cross fire ==
Townsley was the station officer in charge of Red Watch at Soho Fire Station, London. He was in charge of the first fire engine to arrive at the King's Cross fire on 18 November 1987 and was the most senior officer at the scene. Townsley had entered the Underground with a colleague to assess the situation.

Witnesses said a firefighter wearing a white helmet, believed to be Townsley, had been telling passengers to evacuate just before the fatal flashover.

Crews found Townsley beside the badly burned body of a passenger at the steps leading up to the Pancras Road entrance of the station. Colleagues carried him out of the ticket hall and paramedics attempted unsuccessfully to resuscitate him.

His funeral was held at St. Paul's Church in Covent Garden, with the Bishop of Fulham, the Rt. Rev. John Klyberg, paying tribute to Townsley's bravery and offering his sympathy to his widow and daughters. More than 3,000 fire fighters paid tribute to Townsley, with the appliance that took him to the fire carrying his body to his funeral.

== Aftermath of the fire ==
In the official inquiry into the fire, Sir Desmond Fennell said all the evidence suggested "Station Officer Townsley was overcome by smoke and fumes while trying to help the burned passenger ... a heroic act".

Townsley was posthumously awarded the Chief Officer's Commendation and the George Medal for his actions in the fire. His citation for the George Medal notes that "He displayed selfless devotion to duty and gallantry of a high order when faced with conditions of extreme danger". It goes on to say that with a "total disregard for his own safety", and even without breathing equipment, Townsley remained within the booking hall area "to assist as best he could those seeking to escape until he was overcome by toxic fumes".

The fire engine that took Townsley and his colleagues to the tragedy, and which later carried his coffin, has been restored and dedicated to his memory. It is now kept at Chiswick Fire Station as a memorial. At Soho Fire Station, Townsley's space remains empty in his memory and Chiswick Fire Station also has a memorial to him.

Townsley's name is included on the plaque at King's Cross that memorialises the victims of the fire which was provided by the King's Cross Disaster Fund.
