= 1973 Lincoln by-election =

English Parliamentary election

- 1 March 1973

Constituency of Lincoln
- Turnout: 72.6% (▼1.9%)
	First party	Second party	Third party
		Lab	Con
Candidate	Dick Taverne	John Dilks	Jonathan Guinness
Party	Democratic Labour	Labour	Conservative
Popular vote	21,967	8,776	6,616
Percentage	58.2%	23.2%	17.5%
Swing	▲58.2%	▼27.7%	▼21.5%
MP before election
Dick Taverne
Labour
Subsequent MP
Dick Taverne
Democratic Labour

The 1973 Lincoln by-election of 1 March 1973 saw the re-election of Dick Taverne as Member of Parliament for Lincoln as a Democratic Labour representative, after Taverne's pro-Common Market views saw him repudiated by the Lincoln Constituency Labour Party. The by-election led to considerable speculation, stoked by Taverne, about the formation of a new centre party, but Taverne was unable to make his victory last.

== Background ==
Dick Taverne had first been elected in Lincoln at a previous by-election in 1962. His selection then had been controversial as the shortlist had been restricted to three supporters of Hugh Gaitskell in order to stop a left-wing candidate winning; a group of left-wingers led by Leo Beckett had walked out of the selection declaring that the three were "all of a kind". The left-wing faction soon gained ground in the local party although no moves were made against Taverne. Beckett would later marry Margaret Jackson, the Labour candidate who eventually defeated Taverne in October 1974.

When the Labour Party went into opposition after 1970, tension between the Member of Parliament and his local party soon grew. In January 1971 Taverne threatened to denounce Don Gossop, district secretary of the Amalgamated Union of Engineering Workers, if Gossop called for strike action against the Industrial Relations Bill.

=== European issue ===
On 5 July 1971 a committee of the local party voted to send to the annual Labour Party conference a motion highly critical of the application to join the European Communities which called upon all Labour MPs to oppose. At the conference, Leo Beckett called for a "vote of no-confidence against Mr Taverne if he votes in the Tory lobby"; however, less than a month later Taverne broke the Labour Party whip to vote in favour of accepting the terms and joining the European Common Market.

=== Moves to deselect Taverne ===
Attention was drawn to the escalating row by Granada Television's World in Action which broadcast a programme on 25 October showing Taverne being confronted by his opponents; Leo Beckett and Don Gossop were said to have "emerged with badly scarred reputations". However, at a special meeting of the General Management Committee of the local party on 16 November a motion expressing lack of confidence in Taverne was narrowly passed. Taverne was briefly saved on 6 December when the motion (which had to be passed by two successive meetings) saw a tied vote and the party executive's motion to not take any further action was approved.

Through 1972 the left gained further ground in the local party and in June they made another move. Taverne organised an opinion poll in the Lincoln constituency which found that 71% said he was right to have voted in accordance with his own views rather than those of his local party, and 79% approved of him as their MP. However, the poll failed to persuade the local party, and at a meeting on 19 June Taverne was "asked to retire" by a vote of 75 to 50. Taverne insisted that he would appeal to the Labour Party's National Executive Committee.

== Announcement of resignation ==
On 6 October Taverne announced his intention to resign his seat and to stand in the resulting by-election as a "Democratic Labour" candidate. He was immediately backed by a poll commissioned by London Weekend Television which found 49% of Lincoln voters were most likely to vote for him, 16% for the Conservative Party, 14% for the official Labour Party candidate, with 2% for others and 19% undecided.

Taverne's appointment as Steward of the Manor of Northstead did not take effect until 16 October. As he had been a Labour Party MP, the timing of the by-election was up to the Labour Party Chief Whip, Bob Mellish, who declared his preference to wait until the new year. Taverne appealed for a polling day before Christmas. Liberal Party chief whip David Steel considered intervening to 'move the writ' for the by-election, which provoked Mellish to threaten "open warfare".

== Candidates ==
After Taverne himself, the first candidate to declare was Reg Simmerson, chairman of "Democratic Conservatives Against the Common Market", who said that as Labour voters would have the choice of pro- and anti-EEC candidates, Conservative voters should have the same choice.

Lincoln Labour Party shortlisted six candidates as part of the selection of official candidate. They were David Winnick, who had been MP for Croydon South, Gerald McNamara, brother of Hull North MP Kevin McNamara, journalist Max Madden, lecturer Joshua Bamfield, engineer Robert Dixey, and John Dilks, who was leader of Derby Borough Council and a management executive with the Derby Cooperative Society. The selection eventually went to Dilks.

The Conservatives considered three candidates: Desmond Fennell, a Lincoln-born barrister, Robert V. Jackson, a journalist, and merchant banker Hon. Jonathan Guinness who was chairman of the Monday Club on the party's right-wing. Guinness eventually won the selection, which helped the party neutralise the effect of Simmerson's candidature but caused difficulties. It was claimed in The Spectator that the local party regarded Guinness as tiresome and put little effort into campaigning, reasoning that a Taverne win would cause problems for the Labour Party, although doubt was cast on whether this was an accurate impression.

There was a dispute within the Liberal Party over whether to stand. Senior members of the party sympathised with Taverne and wanted the party to withdraw in his favour. Peter Hain, chairman of the Young Liberals, demanded a Liberal candidate stand in opposition to Taverne "who stands on the right of the Labour Party and whose record shows no signs of radicalism". The party eventually decided not to fight, but its success at the Sutton and Cheam by-election in December 1972 led to increased pressure to stand. Eventually the local party's decision not to fight was endorsed.

The candidates list was rounded off with two minor candidates, Jean Justice and Malcolm Waller. Justice, son of a Belgian diplomat and a London property consultant, was chairman of the A6 Murder Committee. The committee's aim was to prove the innocence of James Hanratty who had been hanged in 1962 for the murder of Michael Gregsten. In the mid-1960s, Taverne had served as a Home Office Minister and rejected a plea for a public inquiry into the case. Malcolm Waller formed the "Majority Rule Party" which argued that "the will of the majority of the people shall prevail, even when it conflicts with the will of members of Parliament". A Mr James Blackwell from Cheshire also telephoned the Returning Officer to ask for nomination papers but did not arrive.

== Campaign ==
The writ for the by-election was issued on 9 February, with polling on 1 March; two other writs for by-elections in Labour-held constituencies were moved simultaneously. The Labour Party pulled in a large number of senior shadow cabinet members to speak in support of John Dilks, described by The Times as "probably unequalled in any byelection". This included moderate social democrats in the party like Anthony Crosland and Denis Healey, but not Roy Jenkins, who refused to go and had considered defecting from Labour himself. Taverne, by contrast, organised only one meeting at which others spoke in his support, to which he invited the Bishop of Southwark Mervyn Stockwood and newspaper columnist Bernard Levin. Stockwood gave a particularly rousing speech, and Taverne was surprised to learn, some time later, that it had been written by Oswald Mosley (both he and Stockwell were staunchly pro-Europe), who decided not to attend the meeting as being associated with him would not be helpful to Taverne; and because he was Guinness's step-father.

Dilks insisted that he would campaign on issues like inflation, the future of Lincoln, and the EEC, and predicted that Taverne would come third. Guinness' campaign was marked by his maverick public statements, and he had to be "protected" by planted questions at a public meeting. He was much quoted as saying that convicted murderers should be given razor blades in order that they could "do the decent thing" (i.e. die of suicide) and save the state the cost of keeping them in jail. Guinness came to be treated as a joke figure by the media, who nicknamed him "Old Razor Blades".

The campaign saw extensive coverage in the press and on broadcast media. On 22 February, The Daily Telegraph reported the results of an opinion poll which showed Taverne had a lead of only 2% over the official Labour candidate, well within the margin of error. However, two opinion polls published on the day of the byelection found Taverne had a substantial lead. Taverne also benefited from strong support from the Lincoln Weekend Chronicle, while the Lincolnshire Echo reported neutrally and did not make an endorsement.

== Result ==
After such a highly publicised campaign, voter turnout was almost up to that in the previous general election. When the result was announced in the early hours of 2 March, it was clear Taverne had been vindicated:

Lincoln by-election, 1973
Party	Candidate	Votes	%	±%
Democratic Labour	Dick Taverne	21,967	58.2	+58.2
Labour	John Dilks	8,776	23.2	−27.8
Conservative	Jonathan Guinness	6,616	17.5	−21.5
Democratic Conservative	Reg Simmerson	198	0.5	New
Majority Rule Party	Malcolm Waller	100	0.3	New
Independent	Jean Justice	81	0.2	New
Majority		13,191	35.0	N/A
Turnout		37,738	72.6	−1.8
Democratic Labour gain from Labour		Swing		

This was the first time that someone other than a Conservative, Labour or Liberal candidate managed to win an English post-war by-election.

== Aftermath ==
Taverne's majority was generally regarded as a shock, and was said to have shocked Taverne himself. In September 1973, he announced the formation of the Campaign for Social Democracy "to play a truly democratic role in changing the course of British politics". In the snap general election the following February, the Campaign managed to nominate five candidates, specifically targeting Labour left-wingers; they hoped that the Liberal Party would not stand, but this was in vain and the candidates performed poorly. Taverne himself only narrowly retained Lincoln in a close three-way result, and in the October 1974 election the seat was gained by Margaret Jackson (later Margaret Beckett) for the Labour Party. Nonetheless, Taverne's departure from the Labour Party was indicative of deeper divisions between the left and right wings of the party over issues including the EEC and the role of trade unions in party governance. Taverne's Campaign for Social Democracy would later be seen as a precursor to the Social Democratic Party, which broke off from the right of the Labour Party in 1981, and which Taverne soon joined.
