= Desmond Fennell (judge) =

British barrister and judge

Sir Desmond Fennell OBE
- Fennell in 1990
- Born: John Desmond Augustine Fennell; 17 September 1933; Lincoln, England
- Died: 29 June 2011 (aged 77)
- Occupations: Barrister and judge

High Court Judge Queen's Bench Division
- In office 1990–1992

Sir John Desmond Augustine Fennell OBE (17 September 1933 – 29 June 2011) was a British barrister and judge who chaired the public inquiry into the 1987 King's Cross fire. He was a High Court judge from 1990 to 1992, when he was forced to retire as a result of a stroke.

== Life ==
Fennell was born on 17 September 1933 in Lincoln, England. He was educated at Ampleforth College and Corpus Christi College, Cambridge. He served with the Grenadier Guards from 1956 to 1958 before being called to the Bar at the Inner Temple. He took silk in 1974 and was made a Recorder in 1983. After spending five years (1984–89) as a Judge of the Court of Appeal of Jersey and Court of Appeal of Guernsey, he became a Judge at the High Court in 1990 and a Judge of the Employment Appeal Tribunal the following year, before retiring from both positions in 1992.

Fennell was appointed Officer of the Order of the British Empire (OBE) in the 1982 New Year Honours "for political service in Wessex", and knighted in 1990. A member of the Conservative Party, he unsuccessfully sought the party's nomination at the 1973 Lincoln by-election, and was chairman of the Buckingham Division Conservative Association from 1976 to 1979.

In 1966, he married Susan Trusted (born 1939). They had three children, including a son and two daughters.
