= Habit =

Routine of behavior that is repeated regularly and tends to occur subconsciously

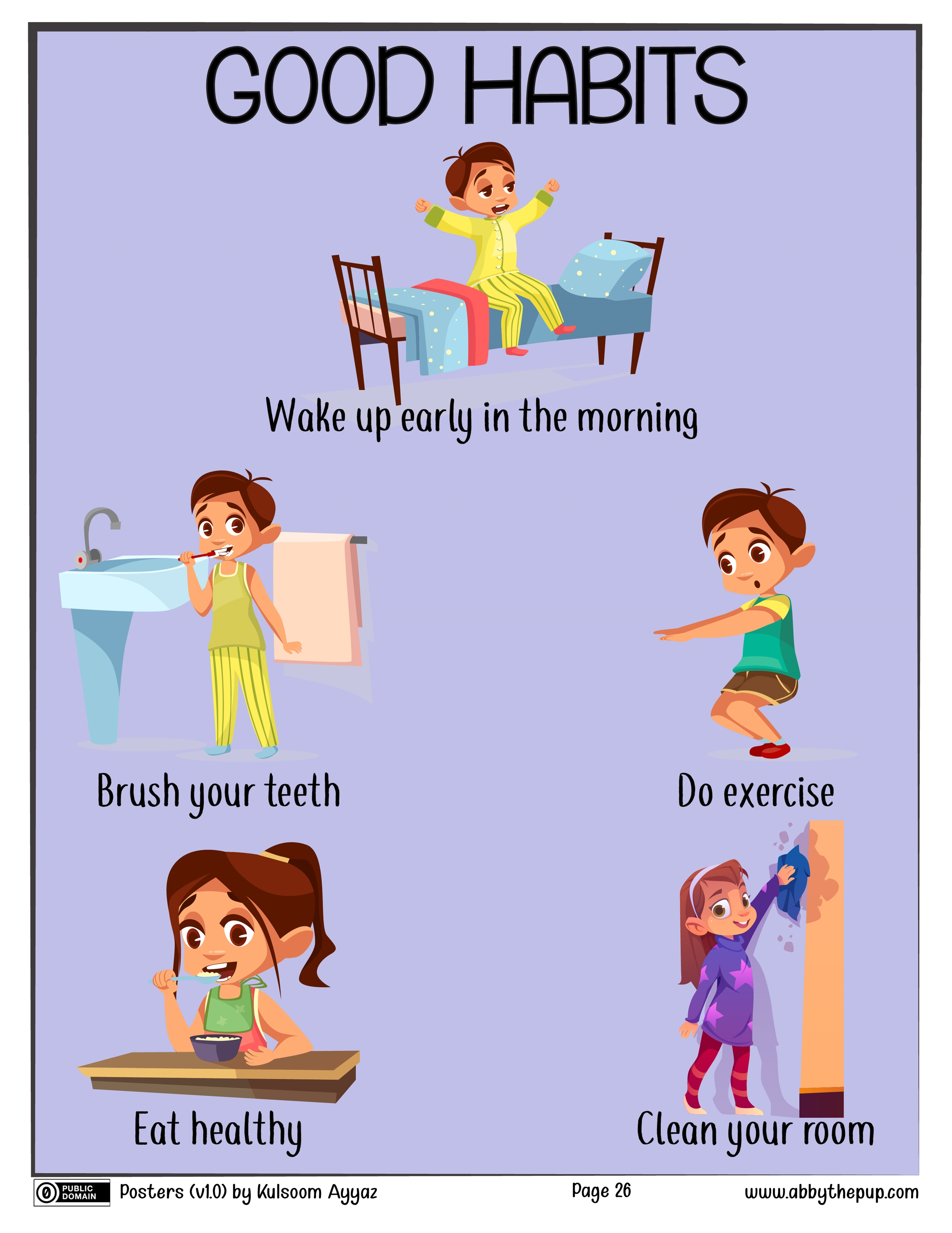
Good Habits Poster

A habit (or wont, the original word in English) is a routine of behavior that is repeated regularly and tends to occur subconsciously.

A 1903 paper in the American Journal of Psychology defined a "habit, from the standpoint of psychology, [as] a more or less fixed way of thinking, willing, or feeling acquired through previous repetition of a mental experience." Habitual behavior often goes unnoticed by persons exhibiting it, because a person does not need to engage in self-analysis when undertaking routine tasks. Habits are sometimes compulsory. A 2002 daily experience study by habit researcher Wendy Wood and her colleagues found that approximately 43% of daily behaviors are performed out of habit. New behaviours can become automatic through the process of habit formation. Old habits are hard to break and new habits are hard to form because the behavioural patterns that humans repeat become imprinted in neural pathways, but it is possible to form new habits through repetition.

When behaviors are repeated in a consistent context, there is an incremental increase in the link between the context and the action. This increases the automaticity of the behavior in that context. Features of an automatic behavior are all or some of: efficiency, lack of awareness, unintentionality, and uncontrollability.

== History ==
The word habit derives from the Latin words habere, which means "have, consist of," and habitus, which means "condition, or state of being." It also is derived from the French word habit (French pronunciation: [abi]), which means clothes. In the 13th century CE, the word habit first just referred to clothing. The meaning then progressed to the more common use of the word, which is "acquired mode of behavior."

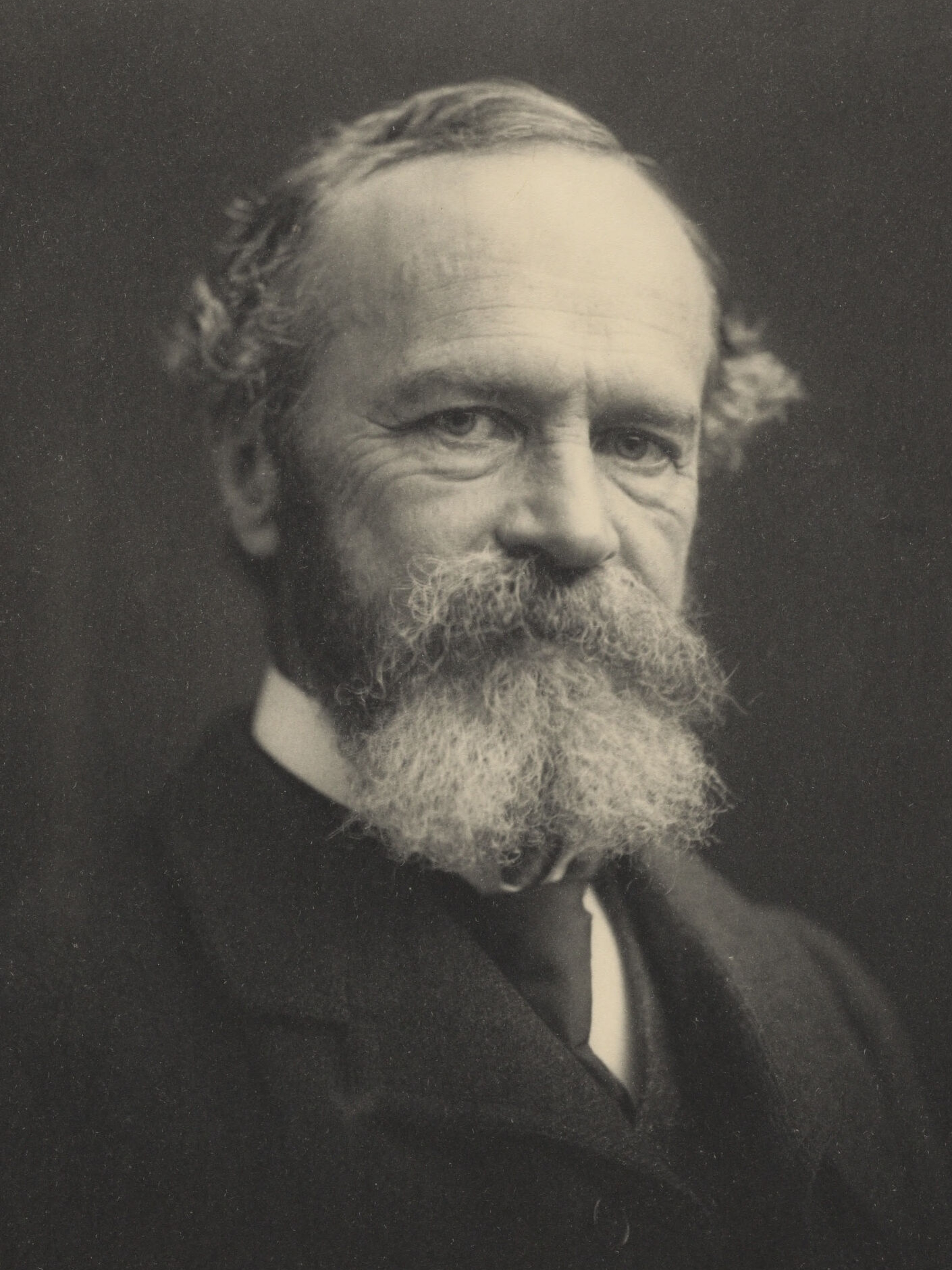
"Habit is...the enormous fly-wheel of society, its most precious conservative agent...It is well for the world that in most of us, by the age of thirty, the character has set like plaster, and will never soften again." - William James, The Principles of Psychology

In 1890, William James, a pioneering philosopher and psychologist, addressed the subject of habit in his book, The Principles of Psychology. James viewed habit as natural tendency in order to navigate life. To him, "living creatures... are bundles of habits" and those habits that have "an innate tendency are called instincts." James also explains how habits can govern our lives. He states, "Any sequence of mental action which has been frequently repeated tends to perpetuate itself; so that we find ourselves automatically prompted to think, feel, or do what we have been before accustomed to think, feel, or do, under like circumstances, without any consciously formed purpose, or anticipated of result."

Habit played an important role in the phenomenology of French philosopher Maurice Merleau-Ponty. For Merleau-Ponty, habit was a form of embodied consciousness.

More focused experimental studies of habit formation started from Nikolai Bernstein's work in 1920s. Bernstein invented his own devices of tracking physical motions of learners and experts in some activities. He showed that behaviour is regulated by several "levels of control" that differ in the degree of automaticity of procedural knowledge.

== Formation ==
Habit formation is the process by which a behavior, through regular repetition, becomes automatic or habitual.

Nikolai Bernstein, based on his experiments in 1920-30s, proposed five levels of regulation of behaviour, three of which could be seen now as "automatic", fourth as a semi-conscious level and fifth as a level of higher reasoning Simpler models of habit formation described an increase in automaticity with the number of repetitions, up to an asymptote. This process of habit formation can be slow. Lally et al. found the average time for participants to reach the asymptote of automaticity was 66 days with a range of 18–254 days.

There are four main components to habit formation: the context cue, craving, behavioral repetition, and the reward. The context cue can be a prior action, time of day, location, or anything that triggers the habitual behavior. This could be anything that one associates with that habit, and upon which one will automatically let a habitual behavior begin. The cue leads to a craving or desire. The craving is the motivational force behind the habit. You don’t crave the habit itself; you crave the outcome you believe it will bring. The behavior is the actual habit that one exhibits, and the reward, such as a positive feeling, reinforces the "habit loop". A habit may initially be triggered by a goal, but over time that goal becomes less necessary and the habit becomes more automatic. Intermittent or uncertain rewards have been found to be particularly effective in promoting habit learning.

A variety of digital tools, such as online or mobile apps, support habit formation. For example, Habitica uses gamification, implementing strategies found in video games to real-life tasks by adding rewards such as experience and gold. However, a review of such tools suggests most are poorly designed with respect to theory and fail to support the development of automaticity.

Shopping habits are particularly vulnerable to change at "major life moments" like graduation, marriage, the birth of the first child, moving to a new home, and divorce. Some stores use purchase data to try to detect these events and take advantage of the marketing opportunity.

Some habits are known as "keystone habits," and these influence the formation of other habits. For example, identifying as the type of person who takes care of their body and is in the habit of exercising regularly, can also influence eating better and using credit cards less. In business, safety can be a keystone habit that influences other habits that result in greater productivity.

A recent study by Adriaanse et al. found that habits mediate the relationship between self-control and unhealthy snack consumption. The results of the study empirically demonstrate that high self-control may influence the formation of habits and in turn affect behavior.

== Goals ==
The habit–goal interface or interaction is constrained by the particular manner in which habits are learned and represented in memory. Specifically, the associative learning underlying habits is characterized by the slow, incremental accrual of information over time in procedural memory. Habits can either benefit or hurt the goals a person sets for themselves.

Goals guide habits by providing the initial outcome-oriented motivation for response repetition. In this sense, habits are often a trace of past goal pursuit. Although, when a habit forces one action, but a conscious goal pushes for another action, an oppositional context occurs. When the habit prevails over the conscious goal, a capture error has taken place.

Behavior prediction is also derived from goals. Behavior prediction acknowledges the likelihood that a habit will form, but in order to form that habit, a goal must have been initially present. The influence of goals on habits is one of the reasons that makes habits different from other automatic processes in the mind.

== Nervousness ==
Some habits are nervous habits. These include nail-biting, stammering, sniffling, and banging the head. They are symptoms of an emotional state and conditions of anxiety, insecurity, inferiority, and tension. These habits are often formed at a young age and may be due to a need for attention. When trying to overcome a nervous habit, it is important to resolve the cause of the nervousness rather than the symptom which is a habit itself. Anxiety is a disorder characterized by excessive and unexpected worry that negatively impacts individuals' daily life and routines.

== Undesirable habits ==
A bad habit is an undesirable behavior pattern. Common examples of individual habits include procrastination, fidgeting, overspending, and nail-biting. The sooner one recognizes these bad habits, the easier it is to fix them. Rather than merely attempting to eliminate a bad habit, it may be more productive to seek to replace it with a healthier coping mechanism. Undesirable habits may also be shared at a communal level: for example, there are many shared habits of consumer behaviour.

=== Will and intention ===
A key factor in distinguishing a bad habit from an addiction or mental disease is willpower. If a person can easily control the behavior, then it is a habit. Implementation intentions can override the negative effect of bad habits, but seem to act by temporarily subduing rather than eliminating those habits.

=== Elimination ===
Many techniques exist for removing established bad habits, for example withdrawal of reinforcers: identifying and removing factors that trigger and reinforce the habit. The basal ganglia appears to remember the context that triggers a habit, and can revive habits if triggers reappear. Even after a habit appears to be eliminated, it may re-emerge when environmental cues are reintroduced, a phenomenon known as habit renewal. Habit elimination becomes more difficult with age because repetitions reinforce habits cumulatively over the lifespan. According to Charles Duhigg, there is a loop that includes a cue, routine, and reward for every habit. An example of a habit loop is: TV program ends (cue), go to the fridge (routine), eat a snack (reward). The key to changing habits is to identify the cue and modify routine and reward.

== See also ==
- Behavioral addiction
- Fixation (psychology)
- Habitus (disambiguation)
- Self control
- Tetris effect
- Vice
- Perseverance (virtue)

Habit modification approaches

- Behavior modification
- Cognitive behavioral therapy
- Habit reversal training
- Paradoxical intention

Behaviors with habitual elements

- Childhood obesity
- Nail biting
- Neurodermatitis
- Nose picking
- Obsessive-compulsive disorder
- Procrastination
- Thumb sucking
- Bulimia
