= The Deer Hunter (novel) =

Book by E. M. Corder

- First edition
- Author: E. M. Corder
- Language: English
- Genre: Novel
- Publisher: Exeter Books
- Publication date: 1979
- Publication place: United States
- Media type: Print (hardback)
- Pages: 189 pp
- ISBN: 0-89673-035-2
- OCLC: 5653595

The Deer Hunter is a novelization by the American writer E. M. Corder (a pen name of Jerrold Mundis) based upon the screenplay by Deric Washburn and Michael Cimino of the 1978 war drama film The Deer Hunter, a film that won five Academy Awards, including Best Picture and Best Director.

The novel is set in southern Vietnam, in Pittsburgh and in working-class Clairton, Pennsylvania, a Monongahela River town south of Pittsburgh. The book follows a trio of Rusyn American steel worker friends—Michael "Mike" Vronsky, Steven Pushkov, and Nikanor "Nick" Chevotarevich—both before and during their infantry service in the Vietnam War.

The epigraph is from Ernest Hemingway:

There is no hunting like the hunting of man, and those who have hunted armed men long enough and liked it, never care for anything else thereafter.
