= Trench effect =

Rapid spread of fire up an inclined surface

The trench effect is a combination of circumstances that can rush a fire up an inclined surface. It depends on two well-understood but separate ideas: the Coandă effect from fluid dynamics and the flashover concept from fire dynamics:

- The Coandă effect is the tendency of a fast stream of gases to bend towards, and adhere to, nearby surfaces. The stream's static pressure tends to decrease, which creates a pressure difference between the surface and areas far from it. This bends the stream towards the surface and tends to keep it attached to that surface.
- Flashover is a sudden widespread fire, which occurs when most surfaces in a space are heated until they emit flammable gases hot enough to auto-ignite. Before flashover, flammable gases may be emitted, but are too cool to ignite.

The trench effect occurs when a fire burns beside a steeply inclined surface. The flames lie down along the surface, demonstrating the Coandă effect. The flames heat the material further up. These emit gases that autoignite in a flashover event. The flames from these areas are themselves subject to the Coandă effect and blow a jet of flame up to the end of the inclined surface. This jet continues until the fuel depletes.

== Background ==
The trench effect became known because of the scientific investigation of the King's Cross fire, which occurred on the London Underground in 1987. The fire started on an escalator (containing wood and years of built-up grease) between the Piccadilly line platforms and the ticket hall at King's Cross St Pancras tube station. Many eyewitnesses indicated that early on, the fire in the escalator was of manageable size. Officers from the Fire Brigade and British Transport Police indicated that the fire appeared no larger than a cardboard box burning. Those present were surprised when it suddenly threw a sustained jet of flame into the ticket hall. The Coandă effect alone could not explain the sudden blast that blew some survivors off their feet.

The relatively inconspicuous flames associated with the Coandă effect, hugging the space on and under the inclined trench of the escalator steps, led many travellers to believe they were not in immediate danger. One survivor reported approaching the escalator and noting thick black smoke that suddenly blew up. The main loss of life came from the sudden flashover, rather than the precipitating flames of the 'Coandă effect' fire itself. The people in the ticket hall at the top of the escalators, whilst avoiding the visible flames, were caught in the path of the flashover.

In the early stages of the fire, most of the flames were lying down in the escalator trench. Only a few visibly protruded above the balustrade. The sides of the trench further enhanced the effect by preventing heat loss by radiation to the side, insulating and concentrating the heat along the narrow trench. Emergency services were not prepared for a major fire, due to the lack of visible flames. When the treads of the escalator flashed over, the fire grew dramatically and ignited most of the ticket hall. The Health and Safety Executive's Health and Safety Laboratory in Buxton lit fires in 1/10-scale and 1/3-scale models of the escalator and ticket hall, which demonstrated that the trench effect was the main cause of the intensity and rapid spread of the King's Cross fire. The sudden flashover may be attributed to the wood gas (mainly methane) emitted from the pyrolysis of the wooden escalator itself. When the concentration of gas reaches a critical value, the lower flammable limit, the gas suddenly catches fire in the presence of a flame, resulting in an explosion.

An episode of the television series Forensic Files entitled "Flashover" detailed the King's Cross fire, along with the computer modelling and other analyses which discovered the trench effect. An episode of the television series Seconds from Disaster entitled "London's Subway Inferno" detailed both the King's Cross Fire based on eyewitness accounts and the investigation leading up to the discovery of the trench effect.

The trench effect has also been cited as the cause of rapid spread of wildfires up hills, which has led to the deaths of multiple firefighters on several occasions.

== See also ==
- Wildfire modeling
