= One Bad Habit =

One Bad Habit may refer to:

- One Bad Habit (album), 1980 album by Michael Franks
- "One Bad Habit" (song), 2024 song by Tim McGraw
