= The Museum of Dr. Moses =

2007 short story collection by Joyce Carol Oates

- Author: Joyce Carol Oates
- Language: English
- Genre: Short story collection
- Publisher: Harcourt
- Publication date: August 6, 2007
- Publication place: United States
- Media type: Print (hardback)
- Pages: 240
- ISBN: 0-15-101531-7 (first edition)
- OCLC: 74460086
- Dewey Decimal: 813/.54 22
- LC Class: PS3565.A8 M87 2007
- Preceded by: High Lonesome: New & Selected Stories, 1966–2006

The Museum of Dr. Moses: Tales of Mystery and Suspense is a short story collection by Joyce Carol Oates comprising ten thriller and horror stories. The collection was published in 2007 by Harcourt.

== Stories ==
The collection includes ten stories. All were previously published, as indicated:

- "Hi! Howya Doin!" (Ploughshares, Spring 2007, as "Hi Howya Doin")
- "Suicide Watch" (Playboy, May 2006)
- "The Man Who Fought Roland LaStarza" (anthology Murder on the Ropes: Original Boxing Mysteries, 2001)
- "Valentine, July Heat Wave" (Harper's Bazaar UK, July 2006)
- "Bad Habits" (Timothy McSweeney's Quarterly Concern, Winter 2005/2006)
- "Feral" (Fantasy & Science Fiction, September 1998)
- "The Hunter" (Ellery Queen's Mystery Magazine, November 2003)
- "The Twins: A Mystery" (Alfred Hitchcock's Mystery Magazine, December 2002)
- "Stripping" (Postscripts, Spring 2004)
- "The Museum of Dr. Moses" (anthology The Museum of Horrors, 2001)

== Synopsis ==
In "The Man Who Fought Roland LaStarza" a woman's world is upended when she learns the brutal truth about a family friend's death—and what her father is capable of. Meanwhile, a businessman desperate to find his missing two-year-old grandson in "Suicide Watch" must determine whether the horrifying tale his junkie son tells him about the boy's whereabouts is a confession or a sick test. In "Valentine, July Heat Wave" a man prepares a gruesome surprise for the wife determined to leave him. And the children of a BTK-style serial killer struggle to decode the patterns behind their father's seemingly random bad acts, as well as their own, in "Bad Habits."

== Reception ==
Kirkus Reviews described the collection as "surreal interior landscapes, shamelessly incantatory prose and an enduring ambivalence toward the neo-gothic conventions from which Oates draws her power to shock and dismay."
