= The Power of Habit =

Book by Charles Duhigg

- Author: Charles Duhigg
- Language: English
- Publisher: Random House Trade Paperbacks
- Publication date: 2012
- Publication place: United States
- Pages: 371 pages
- ISBN: 9781400069286
- OCLC: 799062458

The Power of Habit: Why We Do What We Do in Life and Business is a book by Charles Duhigg, a New York Times reporter, published in February 2012 by Random House. It explores the science behind habit creation and reformation. The book reached the best seller list for The New York Times, Amazon.com, and USA Today. It was long listed for the Financial Times and McKinsey Business Book of the Year Award in 2012.

== Synopsis ==
=== Habit loop ===
The Habit loop is a neurological pattern that governs any habit. It consists of three elements: a cue, a routine, and a reward. Understanding these components can help in understanding how to change bad habits or form good ones. The habit loop is always started with a cue, a trigger that transfers the brain into a mode that automatically determines which habit to use. The heart of the habit is a mental, emotional, or physical routine. Finally there is a reward, which helps the brain determine if this particular loop is worth remembering for the future. In an article in The New York Times, Duhigg notes, "The cue and reward become neurologically intertwined until a sense of craving emerges".

According to Duhigg, craving drives all habits and is essential in starting a new habit, or reshaping an old one. Duhigg describes how Procter and Gamble used research on the habit loop and its connection to cravings to develop the market for Febreze, a product that eliminates bad odors, to make a fortune.

=== Golden rule of habit change ===
The Golden rule of habit change helps stop addictive habits and replace them with new ones. It states that if you keep the initial cue, replace the routine, and keep the reward, change will eventually occur, although individuals who do not believe in what they are doing will likely fall short of the expectations and give up. Belief is a critical element of such a change, though it can be structured in a number of ways including group settings. Often people who join groups like accountability groups are better off than those who act alone as individuals. Charles Duhigg used several examples to illustrate his argument, including the case of Bill Wilson, a recovering alcoholic whose newfound faith in Christ led him to create Alcoholics Anonymous. In the book, he also discussed "willpower" and its role in creating a habit.

=== Keystone habits ===
A keystone habit is an individual pattern that is unintentionally capable of triggering other habits in the lives of people. Duhigg wrote about the company Alcoa, and how CEO Paul H. O'Neill was able to raise the company's market capitalization by $27 billion by targeting safety in the work environment. O'Neil said, "I knew I had to transform Alcoa, ... [b]ut you can't order people to change, that's not how the brain works. So I decided I was going to start by focusing on one thing. If I could start disrupting the habits around one thing, it would spread throughout the entire company."

=== Training ===
In February, 2020, Charles Duhigg partnered with VitalSmarts, a corporate training company, to release The Power of Habit Training. The one-day course teaches people the science of habit formation introduced in the book. Learners are taught skills for recognizing the behaviors they should change and how to make new behaviors stick by manipulating the habit loop to work in their favor. The course is offered in live, virtual, and on-demand formats and is taught in public workshops both online and around the world.

== Critical reception ==
In a 2012 New York Times Book Review essay, psychologist Timothy D. Wilson called The Power of Habit "an entertaining book" and "a serious look at the science of habit formation and change," but wrote that "it's not always clear" how to "boil down these examples into a prescription for change," and that trying to explain so much with one framework "sidesteps crucial distinctions about why people behave 'mindlessly.'"

A 2011 Kirkus Reviews notice called it "a more convincing book than most" for self-help seekers and said "the skilled narrative remains accessible," while also referring to "some simplistic diagrams."
