= Wendy Wood (psychologist) =

Social psychologist

Wendy Wood is a UK-born psychologist who is the Provost Professor Emerita of Psychology and Business at University of Southern California, where she has been a faculty member since 2009. She previously served as vice dean of social sciences at the Dornsife College of the University of Southern California. Her primary research contributions are in habits and behavior change along with the psychology of gender.

She is the author of the popular science book, Good Habits, Bad Habits, released in 2019.

== Background ==
Wood completed her bachelor's degree at the University of Illinois at Urbana–Champaign and her Ph.D. at the University of Massachusetts, Amherst.

Prior to USC, Wood was on the faculty at the University of Wisconsin–Milwaukee, Texas A&M University as the Ella C. McFadden Professor of Liberal Arts, and Duke University, where she was the James B. Duke Professor of Psychology and Neuroscience.

Wood is a fellow of the Society for Personality and Social Psychology, the Association for Psychological Science, and the Society for Experimental Social Psychology, and a founding member of the Society for Research Synthesis Methodology. She has also served as associate editor of Psychological Review, American Psychologist, Personality and Social Psychology Review, Journal of Personality and Social Psychology, and Personality and Social Psychology Bulletin. She served as president of the Society for Personality and Social Psychology (SPSP) and the Association for Psychological Science. Her research has been recognized with awards, including a 2007 Radcliffe Institute fellowship, the 2021 Distinguished Contribution Award from Attitudes and Social influence, and the 2022 Career Contribution Award from SPSP. Her scientific research has been cited almost 60,000 times.

== Research on habits ==
Wood's primary research focuses on the nature of habits and their influence on behavior. Habits are cognitive associations that people learn through repeated experience. Each time a behavior is repeated in the same context (location, time of day) for a reward (meeting a goal, feeling good), connections form in memory between the context and the rewarded response. After enough repetition, the habitual response is automatically activated in mind when people are in that context. Habits are thus mental shortcuts that reduce decision making and make it easy to repeat what we have done in the past. As Wood has shown, and other research has replicated many times, habits can be initiated independently of intentions and can occur with minimal conscious control. Wood's research has focused on how and why people fall back into old habits, how good habits help people meet their goals, how to change unwanted habits, habits of social media use, and how interaction habits lead to discrimination in social groups. A signature finding is that ~40% of people's everyday actions are performed in a habitual way.

People are most likely to form habits when contexts promote easy repetition and when the behavior itself is rewarding. Ease of repetition depends on friction, or existing barriers to performing a behavior (e.g., time, travel distance, effort). Illustrating how even subtle friction influences behavior, people were less likely to take an elevator and more likely to use the stairs in classic research that slowed the closing of an elevator door by 16 seconds. Rewards for a behavior can be intrinsic or extrinsic, but importantly should be experienced during performance. Thus, listening to podcasts while exercising is a reward that helps to build an exercise habit. Rewards activate the release of dopamine in the brain, which help to forge habit memory traces.

Habit performance thus depends on context cues. When people experience changes in everyday contexts, such as when they move house or start a new job, then their old behaviors are no longer automatically cued. Context changes thus disrupt automatic repetition and encourage people to make decisions. Unless they have strong intentions to continue the behavior, they are unlikely to do so in the new context.

== Other research ==
Wood has contributed to two additional research areas: the origins and maintenance of sex-related differences and similarities in social behavior and the dynamics of social influence and attitude change.

In the study of sex and gender, Wood has emphasized that the behavior of women and men can be different or similar, depending on individual dispositions, situations, cultures, and historical periods. This flexibility reflects the central importance of a division of labor between women and men that is not static but is tailored to local ecological and socioeconomic conditions. Each society's division of labor is constrained by women's childbearing and nursing of infants and men's greater size and strength. Because these biological characteristics influence the how efficiently men or women can perform many activities, they create some uniformity across societies in the division of labor as well as variability across situations, cultures, and history.

Within societies, people regulate their own behavior according to their desired gender identities. Wood's research has illuminated the self-regulatory processes by which gender identities affect the behaviors of women and men. She has argued that hormonal, reward, and cardiovascular mechanisms work in conjunction with these social psychological processes to facilitate masculine and feminine behaviors.

Wood has also undertaken research on several aspects of attitudes and social influence. Her work on minority influence has clarified the conditions under which people are influenced by the opinions of those who are in the minority in groups, compared with those who are in the majority. She has also examined the influence processes that occur in close relationships. Her attention to attitude change processes includes the effects of forewarnings of impending influence on the extent to which persuasion is effective.

Wood's work has typically combined primary research and meta-analyses of the available evidence. She has produced several highly cited meta-analyses of social psychological phenomena. A 2014 meta-analysis testing the influence of menstrual cycles on women's mate preferences debunked the then-popular idea that women, when fertile, prefer more masculine, high testosterone men.

== Works ==
- Good Habits, Bad Habits (2019). ISBN 978-1-250-15907-6
