= Bad habit =

Repetitive negative behaviour

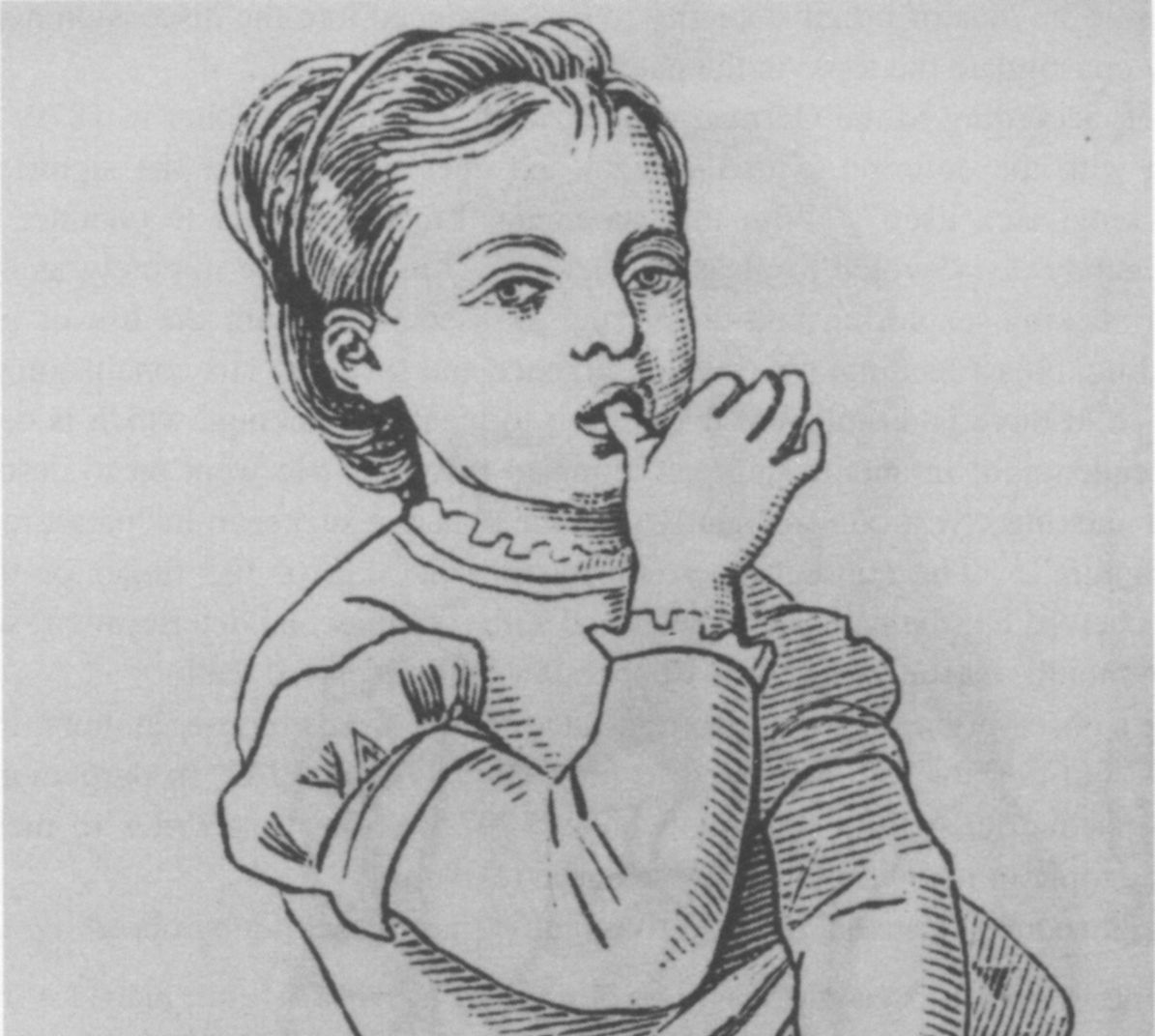
Persistent thumb-sucking is considered a bad habit in children as it may affect the development of the teeth.

A bad habit is a behaviour pattern perceived as negative. Common examples include: procrastination, overspending and nail-biting.

== Development ==
Research on habit formation generally suggests an individual can acquire a new habit on average over 66 days. This process is marked by an asymptomatic increase of the behavior, with the initial acceleration slowing to a plateau after the said time period. There are several variations regarding the period of development. The time to break a bad habit or change an unhealthy behavioral pattern such as smoking may take longer.

== Will and intention ==
A key factor in distinguishing a bad habit from an addiction or mental disease is the element of willpower. If a person still seems to have control over the behavior then it is just a habit. Good intentions are able to override the negative effect of bad habits but their effect seems to be independent and additive — the bad habits remain but are subdued rather than canceled.

== Prevention ==
The best time to correct a bad habit is immediately, before it becomes established. So, bad habits are best prevented from developing in childhood.

== Cure ==
There are many techniques for removing bad habits once they have become established. One good one is to go for between 21 and 28 days try as hard as possible not to give in to the habit then rewarding yourself at the end of it. Then try to go a week, if the habit remains repeat the process, this method is proven to have a high success rate.

== See also ==
- Addiction
- Habit
- Habitus
- Obsession
- Sin
- Vice
