= Charles Duhigg =

American journalist and author

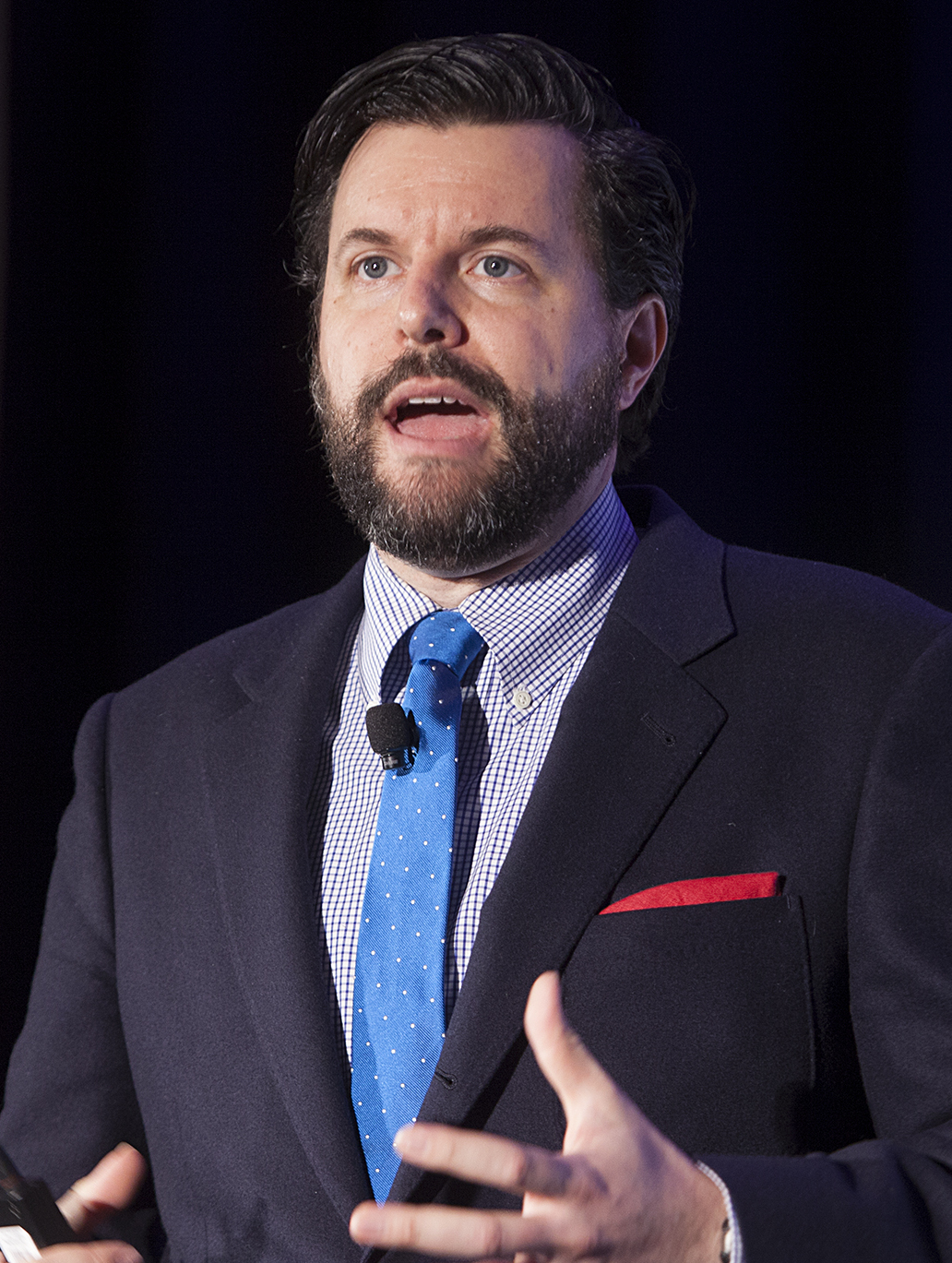
- Duhigg in 2013
- Born: 1974 (age 51–52); New Mexico, U.S.
- Education: Yale University (BA); Harvard University (MBA)
- Occupations: Journalist, Author
- Employer: The New York Times
- Known for: Writing, Journalism
- Relatives: Katy Duhigg (sister)
- Website: charlesduhigg.com

Charles Duhigg (born 1974) is an American journalist and non-fiction author. He was a reporter for The New York Times. He currently writes for The New Yorker Magazine and is the author of three books: The Power of Habit: Why We Do What We Do in Life and Business, Smarter Faster Better and Supercommunicators: How to Unlock the Secret Language of Connection. In 2013, Duhigg was the recipient of the Pulitzer Prize for Explanatory Reporting for a series of ten articles on the business practices of Apple and other technology companies.

== Early life and education ==
Charles Duhigg was born in 1974 in New Mexico. He graduated from Yale University and earned a Master of Business Administration from Harvard Business School.

== Career ==
Duhigg is a former Los Angeles Times staff writer. Between 2006 and 2017, he was a reporter at The New York Times. He currently writes for The New Yorker Magazine.

Duhigg led a team of New York Times reporters who won the 2013 Pulitzer Prize for Explanatory Reporting for a series of 10 articles about the business practices of Apple and other technology companies. Duhigg wrote other series, including Toxic Waters, Golden Opportunities, and was part of the team that wrote The Reckoning.

Duhigg's book about the science of habit formation, titled The Power of Habit: Why We Do What We Do in Life and Business, was published by Random House on February 28, 2012. An extract was published in The New York Times entitled "How Companies Learn Your Secrets." The Power of Habit spent over three years on The New York Times's bestseller lists.

He is also the author of Smarter Faster Better: The Secrets of Being Productive in Life and Business, which was released on March 8, 2016. It became a New York Times Best Seller on March 27, 2016.

In 2024, Duhigg published his third book, Supercommunicators: How to Unlock the Secret Language of Connection. It spent over 30 weeks on the New York Times's bestseller lists.

== Personal life ==
Duhigg resides in Santa Cruz, California. His sister, Katy Duhigg, is an attorney and politician who is a member of the New Mexico Senate.

== Awards ==
- 2007 George Polk Award
- 2007 Heywood Broun Award
- 2008 Hillman Prize
- 2008 Gerald Loeb Award Honorable Mention for Beat Writing for "Golden Opportunities"
- 2009 Scripps Howard National Journalism Award
- 2009 Investigative Reporters and Editors Medal
- 2009 Gerald Loeb Award for Large Newspapers for "The Reckoning"
- 2010 United States National Academies National Academies Communication Award,
- 2010 Society of Environmental Journalists Investigative Reporting Award
- awards from the Society of American Business Editors and Writers, the Deadline Awards, and the John B. Oakes Awards
- 2013, with other The New York Times reporters, Pulitzer Prize for Explanatory Reporting, for a series of 10 articles on the business practices of Apple and other technology companies.

== Books ==
- The Power of Habit: Why We Do What We Do in Life and Business
- Smarter Faster Better: The Secrets of Being Productive in Life and Business
- Supercommunicators: How to Unlock the Secret Language of Connection

== Articles ==
- "How Venture Capitalists Are Deforming Capitalism", The New Yorker, 23 November 2020.link
