= Overspending =

Using up more money than can be afforded

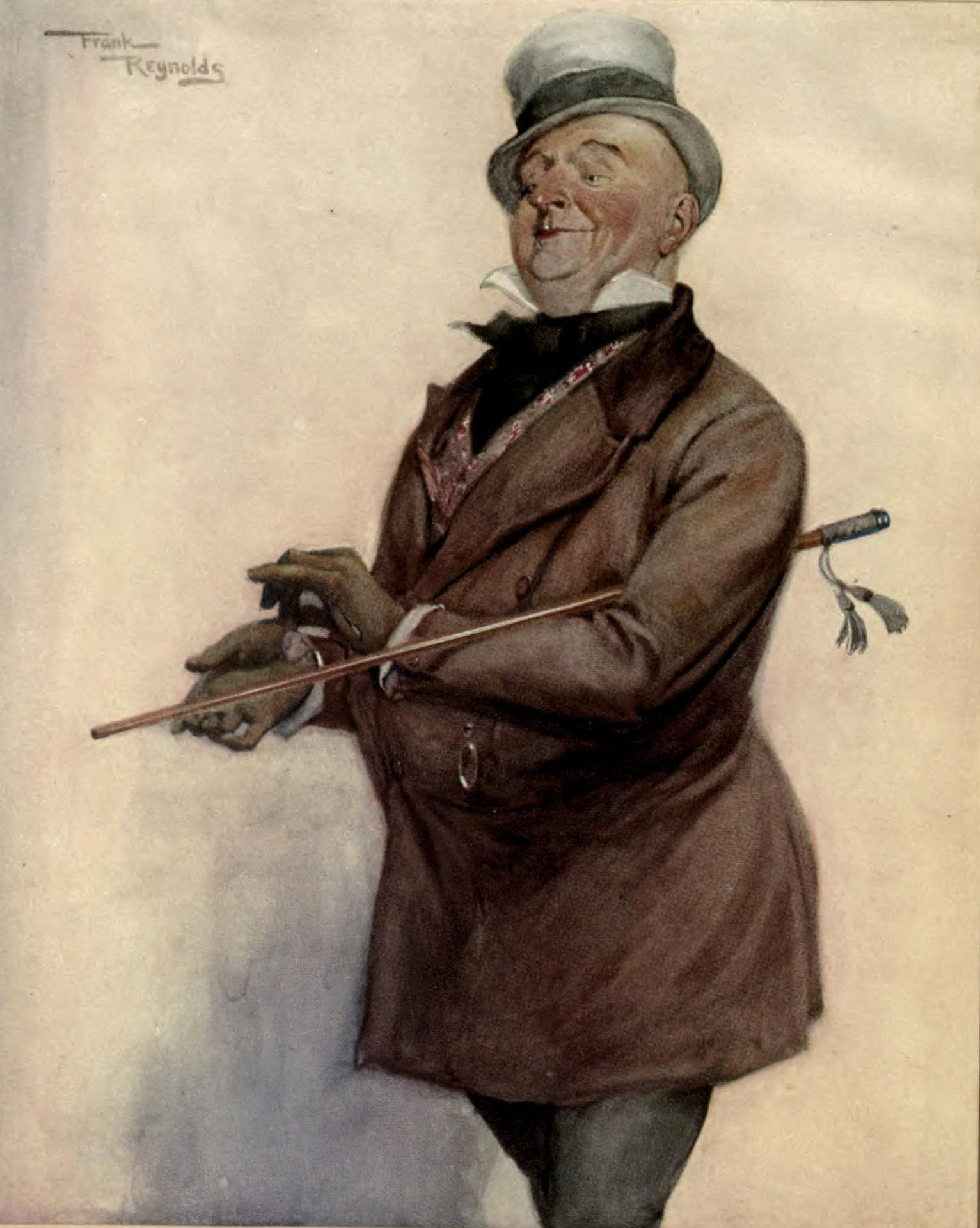
"Annual income twenty pounds; annual expenditure twenty pounds nought and six, — result misery." — Wilkins Micawber

Overspending is spending more money than one can afford. It is a common problem when easy credit is available. The term overspending is also used for investment projects when payments exceed actual calculated cost.

== Causes ==
Some overspending is a form of addictive behaviour due to psychological dependence. The sufferers spend in order to relieve other problems in their lives such anxiety or stress. Others may overspend to impress their associates, for example, by picking up the bill for a meal at a restaurant. There are some who want to impress their neighbors and bring large packets, furniture frequently.

== Credit ==
Sources of credit such as credit cards enable overspending by allowing consumers to spend beyond their income. Financial counselors advise indebted consumers to avoid buying goods on credit and even to cut up their credit cards.

== Distribution ==
An analysis of consumer expenditure showed that 40% of US households overspent in 1990. Other things being equal, educated people were more likely to overspend than the less-educated.

In April 2008, consumer debt in the USA, excluding mortgages, reached a total of $2.56 trillion—over $8,000 per person.

== Risk factors ==
The factors which result in overspending include:

- Low income.
- Low level of assets.
- A level of expenditure similar to that of non-overspenders while having a lower income.
- Higher medical and miscellaneous expenses.

== Savings ==
Savings may prevent overspending because they provide a reserve for unexpected contingencies such as medical expenses and loss of income due to illness.

== Outcome ==
Bankruptcy is a serious result of overspending. In 1991, 0.9% of US households were declared bankrupt.

== In history ==
The Roman Emperors had little access to credit. The treasury was built up by prudent or miserly Emperors like Hadrian and Tiberius and then dissipated by the spendthrift emperors like Nero, Caligula and Commodus. When the treasury ran short, it was most often replenished by proscription and expropriation of the wealth of rich citizens. The overspending which depleted the treasury was largely due to attempts to buy popularity by means of handouts, gifts and lavish entertainments.

== Government ==
Democratic governments commonly overspend due to political pressure and their high level of creditworthiness which enables them to borrow large sums. Such overspending is higher when legislative districts have varied levels of income and problems since all districts are taxed to provide benefits for some districts and this is politically successful. A powerful central executive such as a strong mayor with veto power can offset this tendency.

== See also ==
- Debtors Anonymous
- Moonlight clan
