= Team Robespierre =

American band

- Origin: Brooklyn, New York, U.S.
- Genres: Hardcore punk, post-punk, hyphy
- Years active: 2005–present
- Labels: Paper Bag, Min/Max Records, Impose Records
- Members: Rex; Ty; Tomasz; Mike House; Jason; Jim

Team Robespierre was an American, Brooklyn based band formed in 2005 that plays punk, hyphy, hard house and electro pop music. The band members are Rex (guitar, vocals), Ty (keys, vocals), Tomasz (keys, vocals), Mike House (bass, vocals), Jason (bass, vocals), and Jim (drums). Their debut album Everythings Perfect was released January 22, 2008 on Impose Records. In 2008 they also released a seven-inch record called Bad Habit. The L Magazine has listed them as one of 8 NYC Bands You Need to Hear. The band is well known on the local music scene for their amazing energy in concert. Maximilien Robespierre was a French lawyer and politician, as well as one of the best known and most influential figures associated with the French Revolution.
