= Robert Morden =

English cartographer (1650–1703)

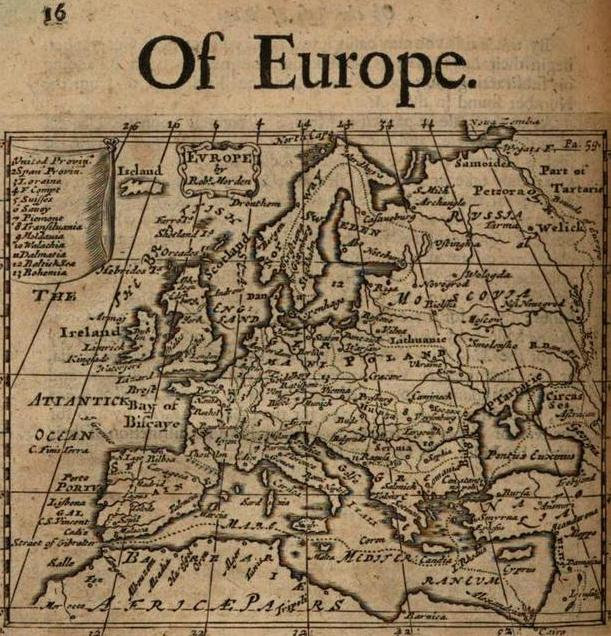
Morden's European Map from Geography Rectified: or a Description of the World, printed in 1700

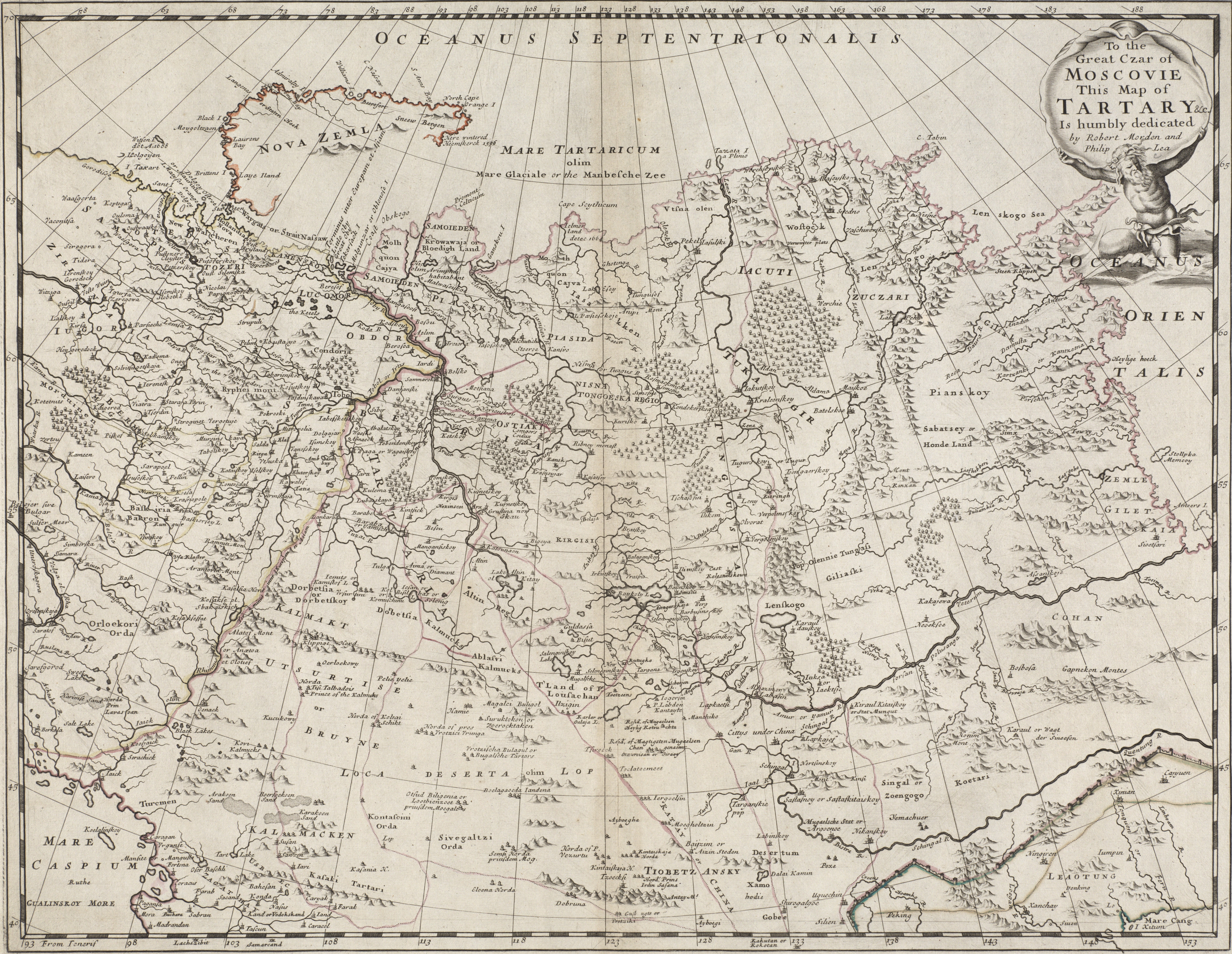
Morden and Philip Lea's 1695 map of Tartary, dedicated to the 'Great Czar of Moscovie'

Robert Morden (c. 1650 – 1703) was an English bookseller, publisher, and mapmaker, globemaker and engraver. He was among the first successful commercial map makers.

Between about 1675 and his death in 1703, he was based "under the sign of the Atlas" at premises in Cornhill and New Cheapside, London. His cartographical output was large and varied. His best-known maps are those of South Wales, North Wales and the English Counties first published in a new edition of William Camden's Britannia in 1695, and subsequently reissued in 1722, 1753 and 1772. These maps were based on new information from gentlemen of each county, and were newly engraved. Each had a decorated cartouche, and showed numerous place names. Morden also produced in 1701 a series of smaller county maps often known as Miniature Mordens.

In 1695 he published a map of Scotland. It is in parts (e.g. Skye and the Western Isles) essentially a copy of the 1654 map done by Robert Gordon of Straloch, published by Joan Blaeu; other parts show evidence of more accurate cartography.

His (fourth edition) of Geography Rectified: or a Description of the World from 1700 dedicated to a Thomas Goddard, is a comprehensive work from many aspects. It has more than 700 pages, including a long pedagogic preface, no fewer than 78 maps from Europe including the British Isles, Asia, Africa, America and a two circular maps of the world, representing planet Earth seen from exactly opposite sides – the known world as of its time. It further contains explanations of many general geographical concepts such as Latitude and Longitude and more. It also contains several comparisons of commodities, customs, history, governments, coins and weights (etc) "with those in London". Its gazetteer is extensive.

He published a new map of the Tamil homeland, Coylot Wanees Country, in 17th-century Ceylon.

He is also known for several very rare early maps of the British colonies in North America, which are now among the earliest and most sought-after maps for collectors of old American maps. He also produced a series of miniature maps of the world, which appeared in both playing-card format and in a series of atlases, including his Atlas Terrestris and Geography Anatomiz'd, beginning in 1687.

Morden was a member of the guild The Worshipful Company of Weavers. He was an apprentice of Joseph Moxon, hydrographer to Charles II. Apprentices who trained under Morden include Mary Ward in 1674, Philip Lea in 1675 and Margaret Wearg in 1675.

== County Maps ==
The links below are to images of Morden's county maps as published in 1722 (Camden's Britannia, Volume 1 & Volume 2). It is noted in the Preface that the maps had been revised since their first publication in 1695, with place-name spellings adjusted where they 'did not answer either the way of writing or the common way of pronouncing among the People'.

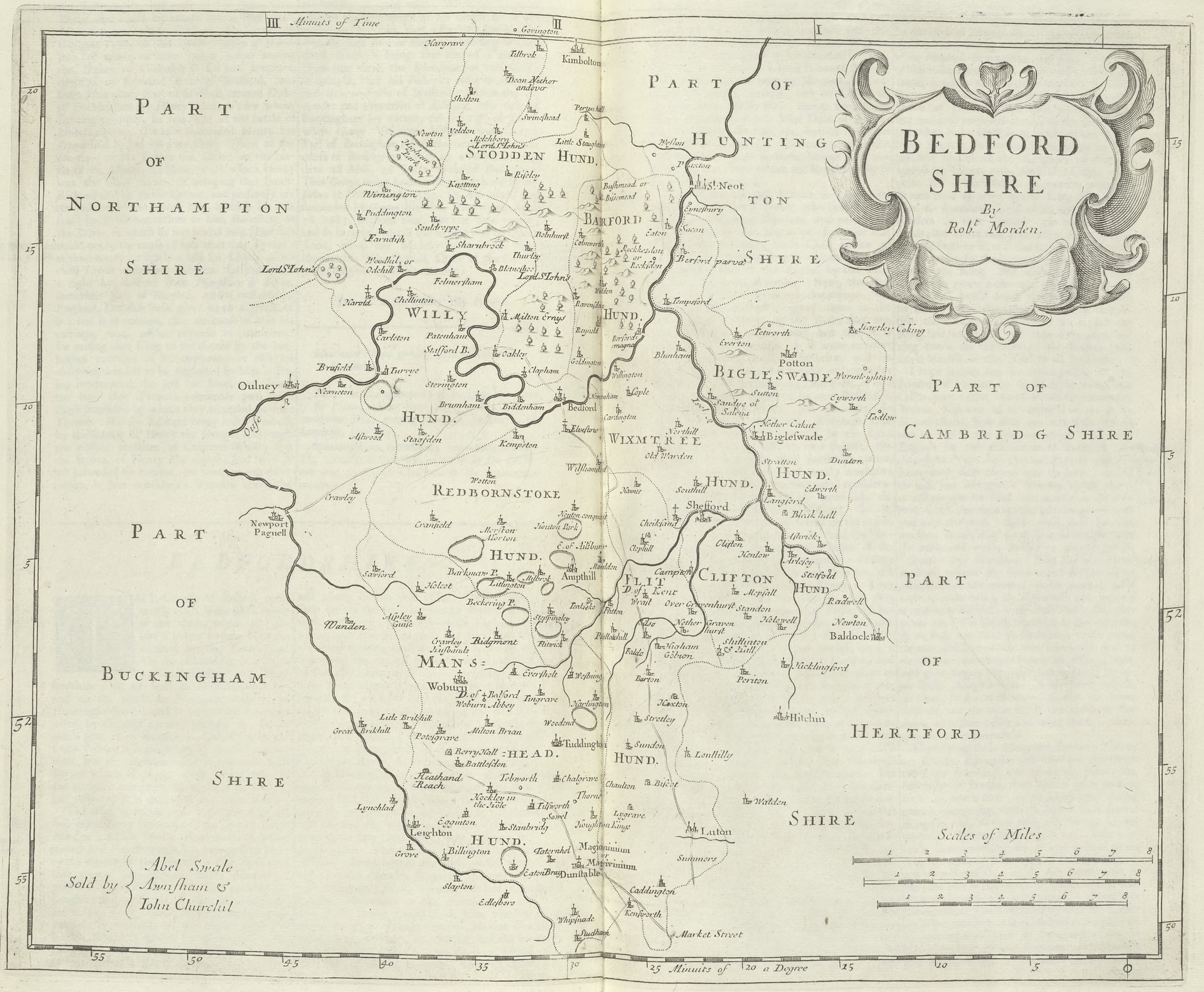
Bedfordshire

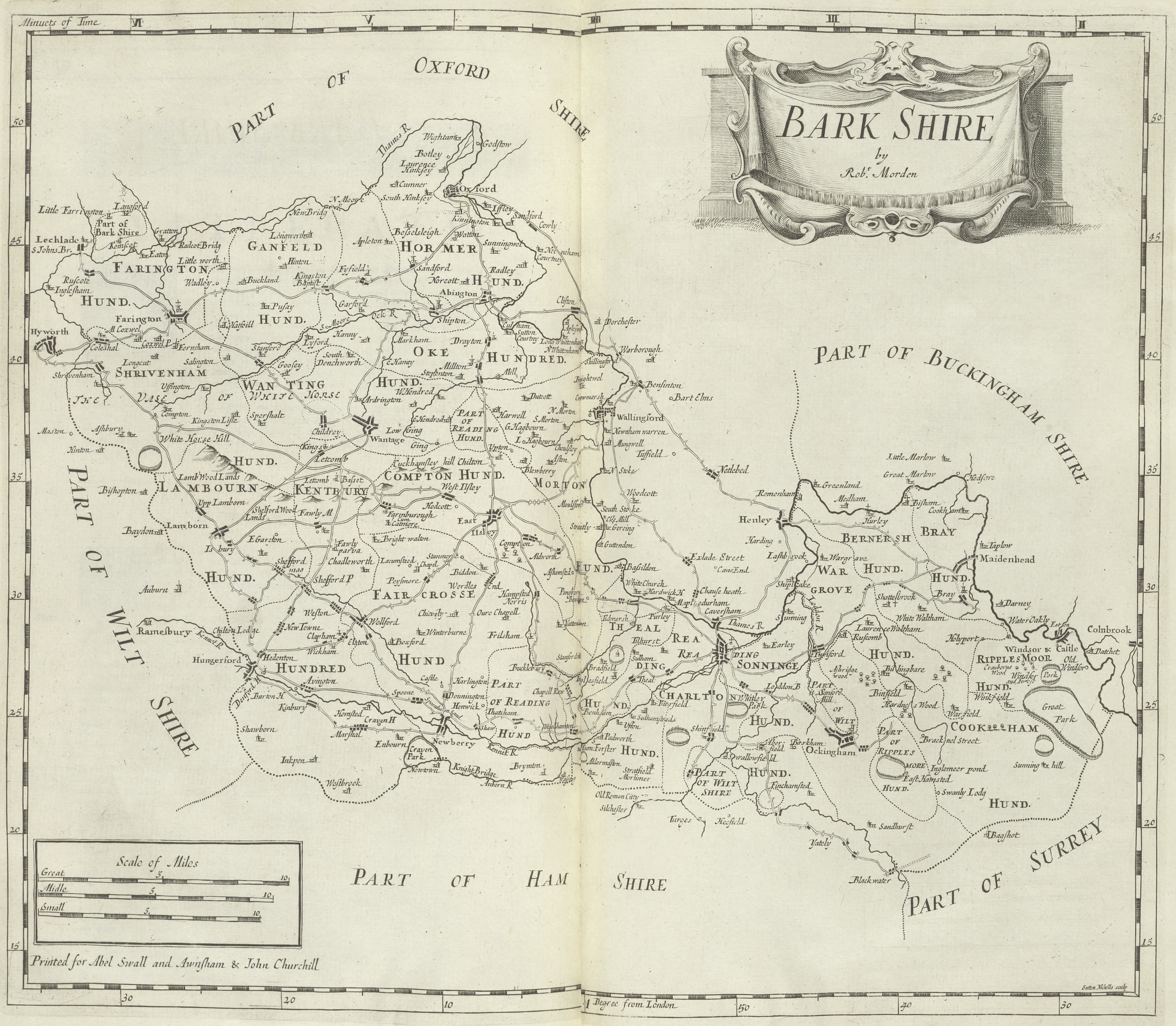
Berkshire

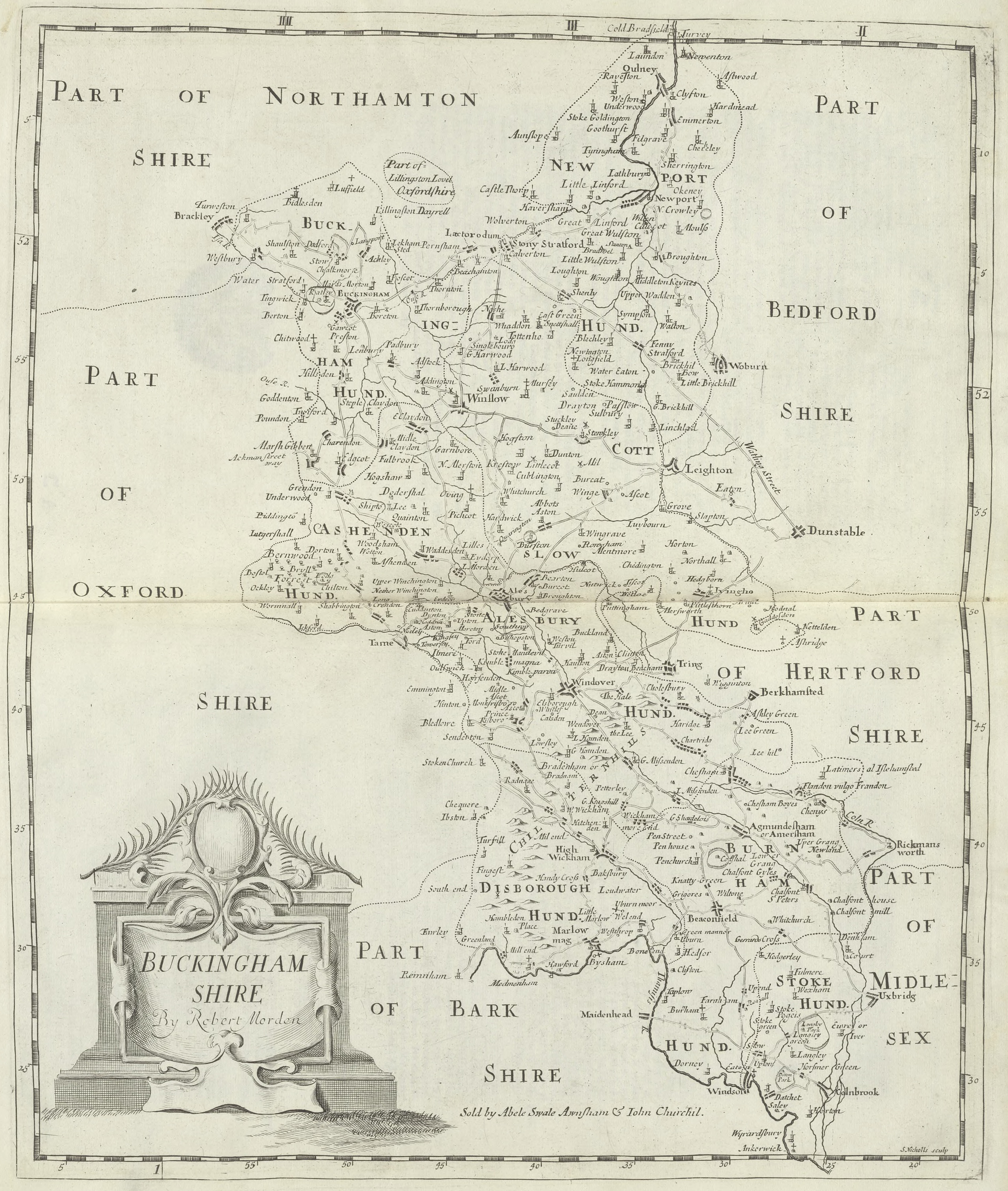
Buckinghamshire

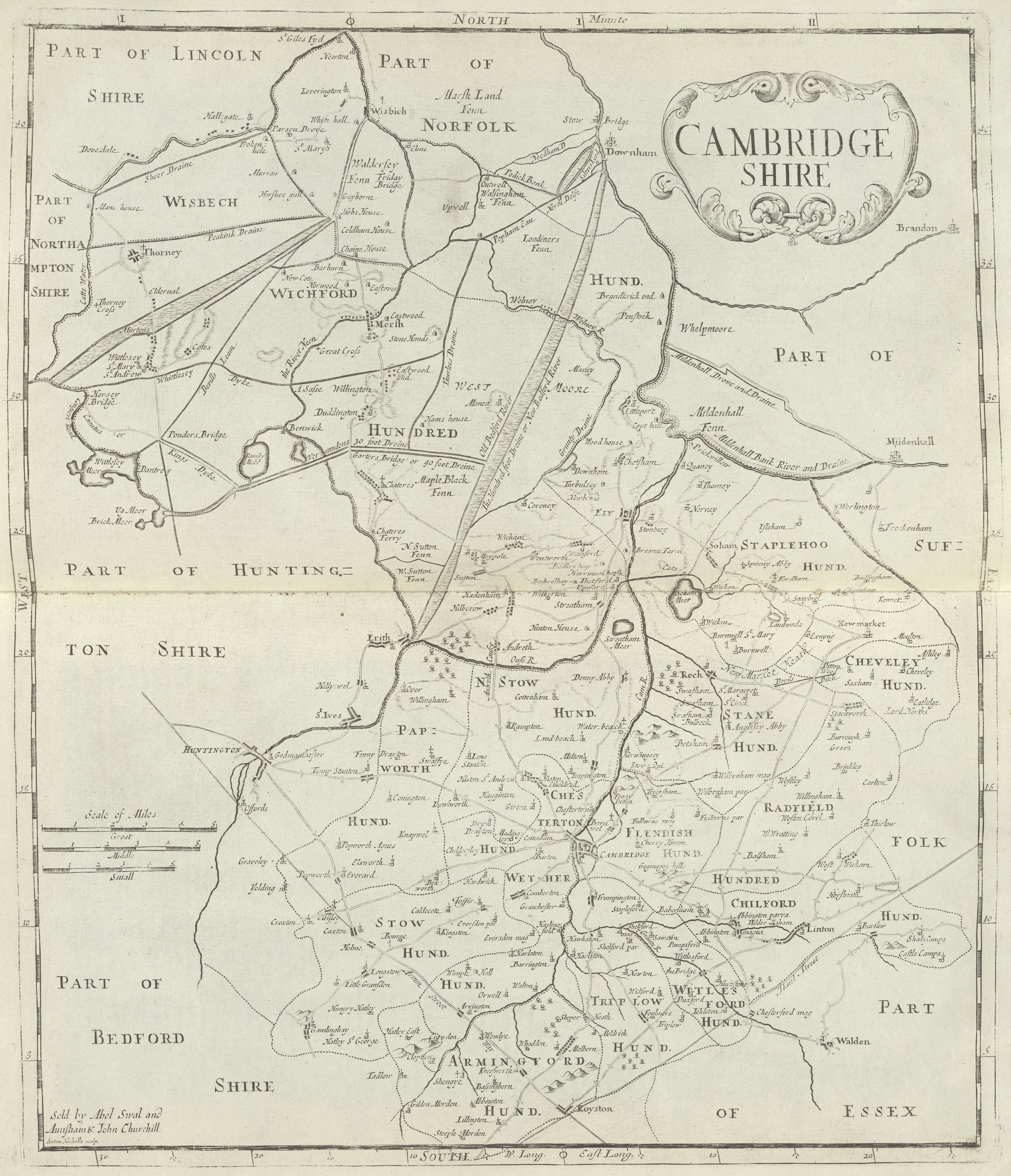
Cambridgeshire

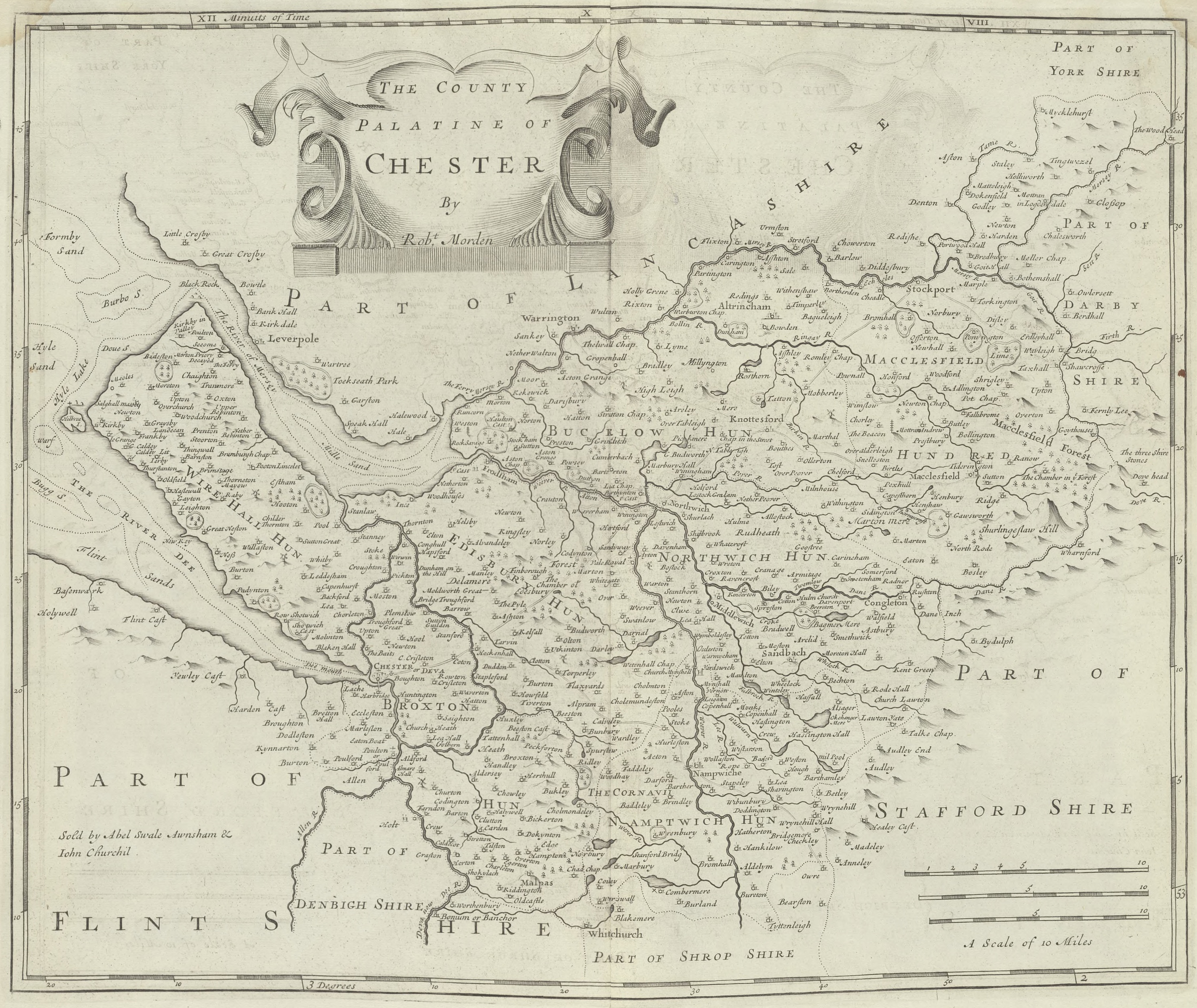
Cheshire

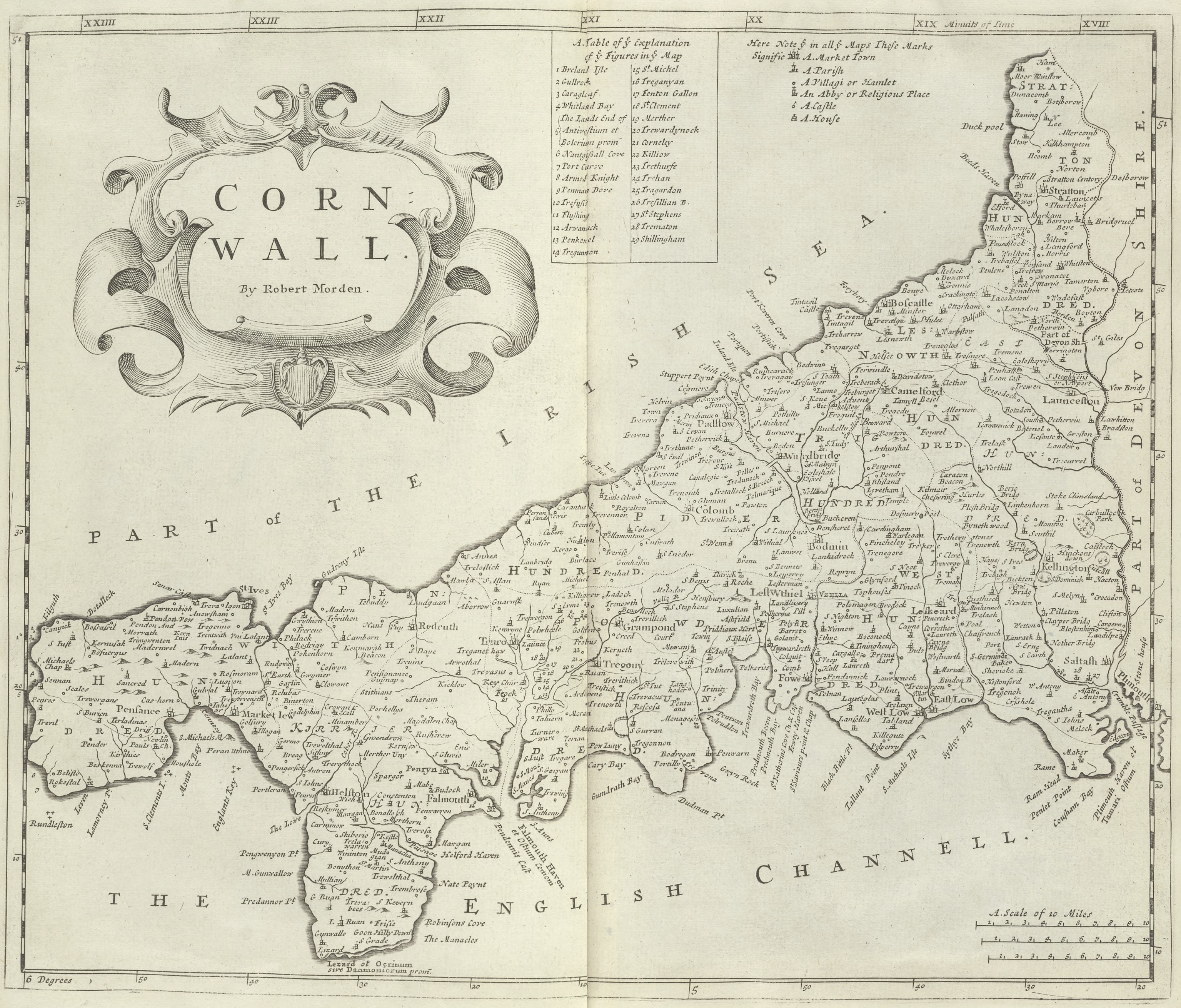
Cornwall

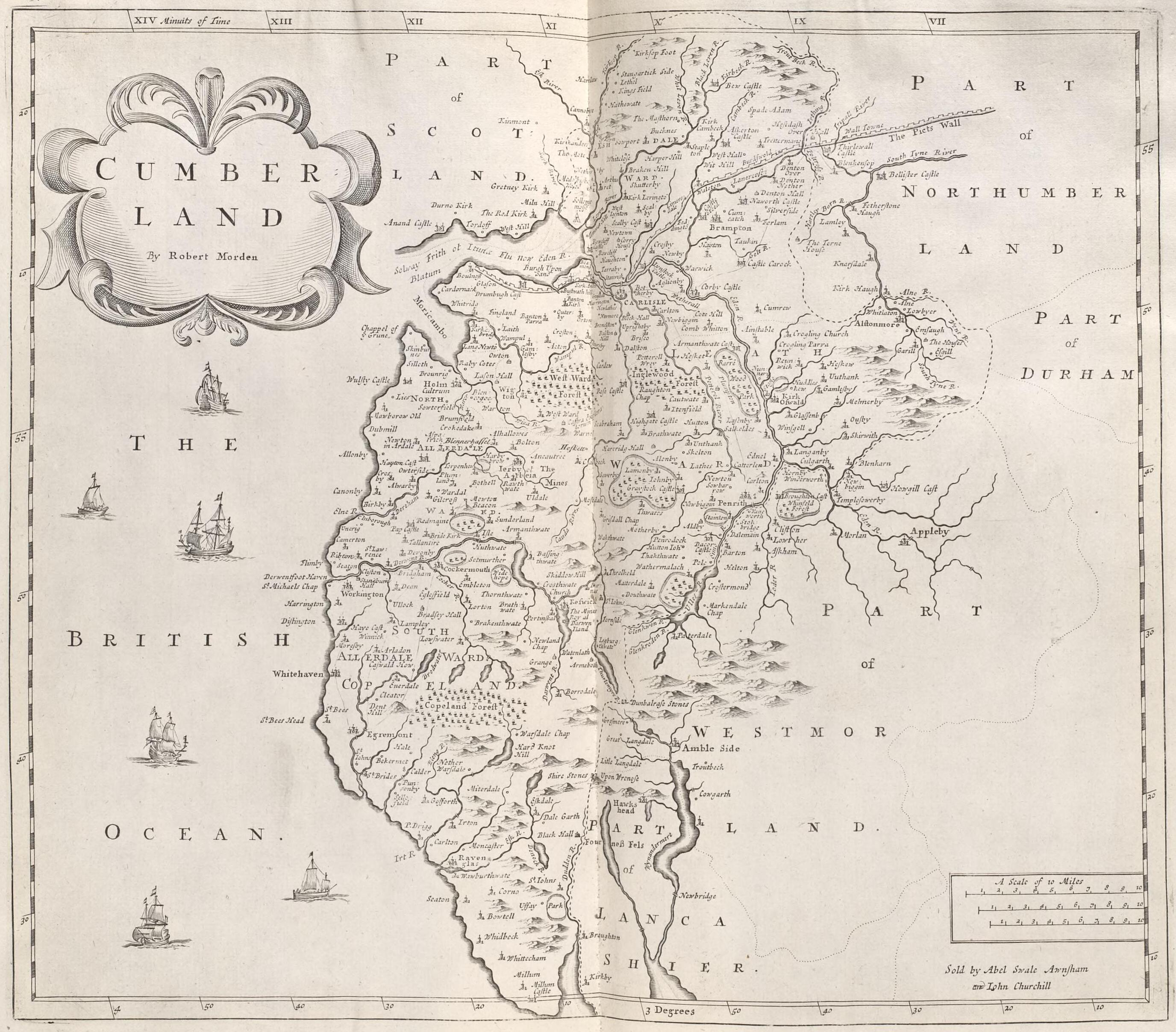
Cumberland

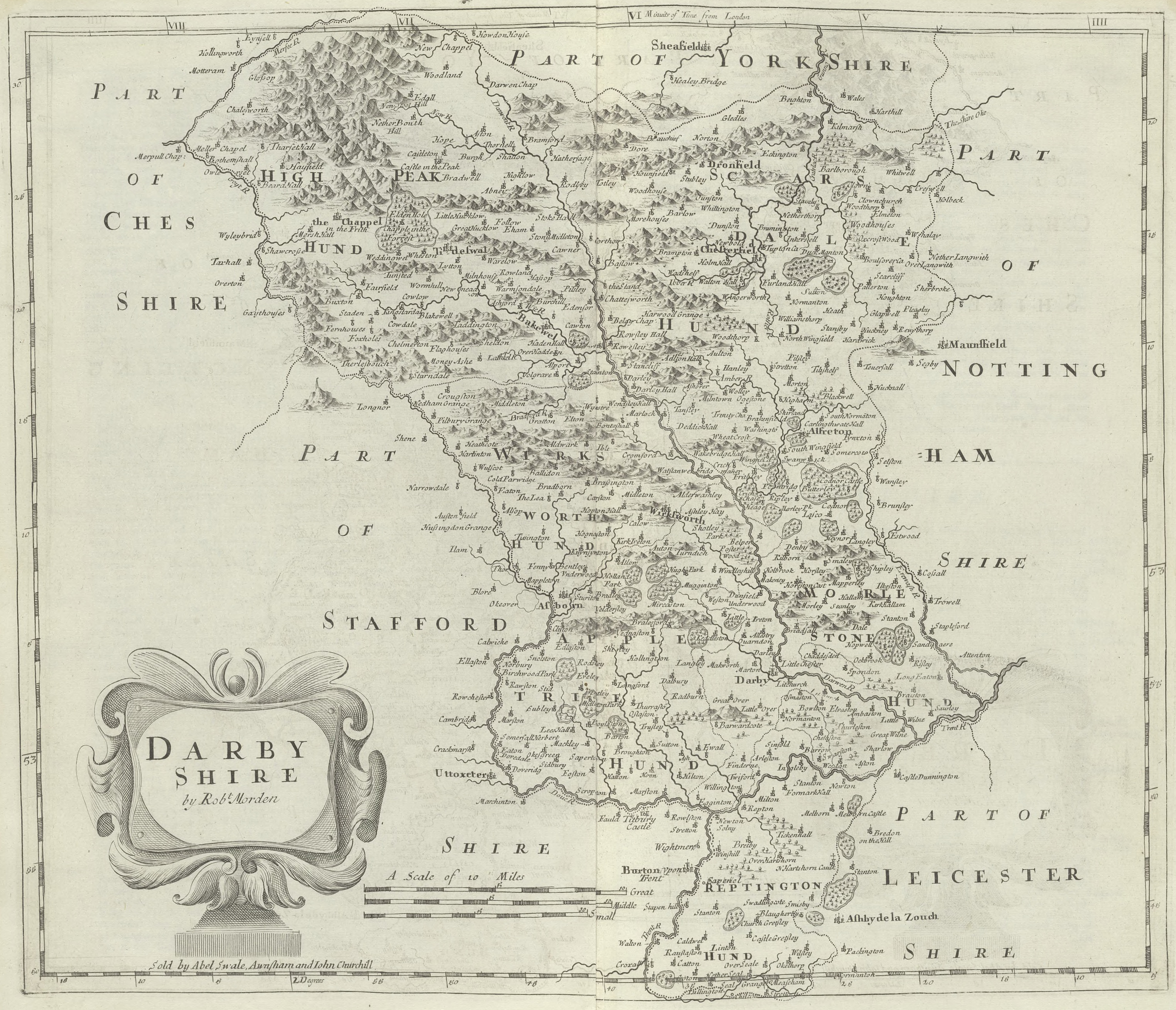
Derbyshire

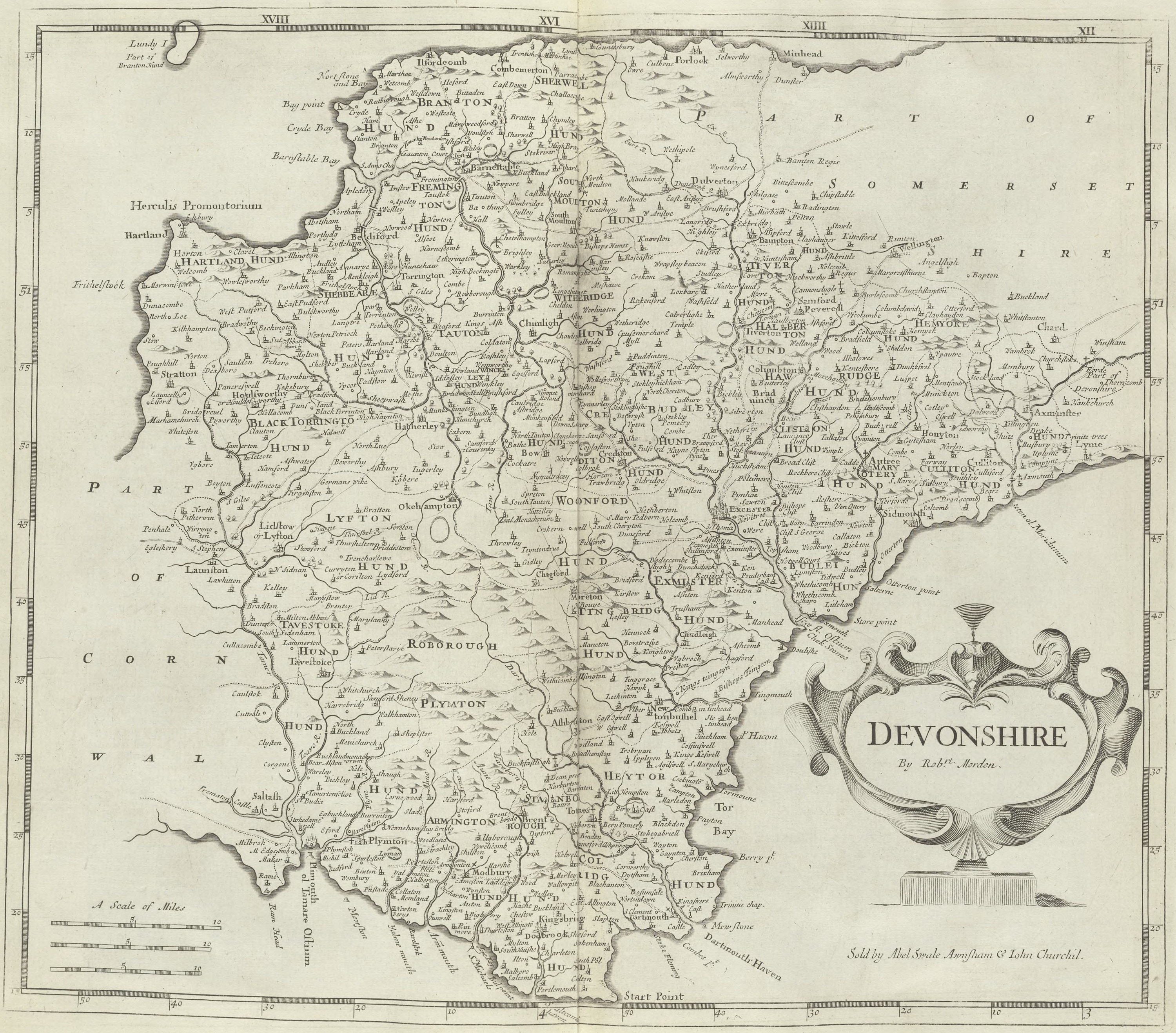
Devon

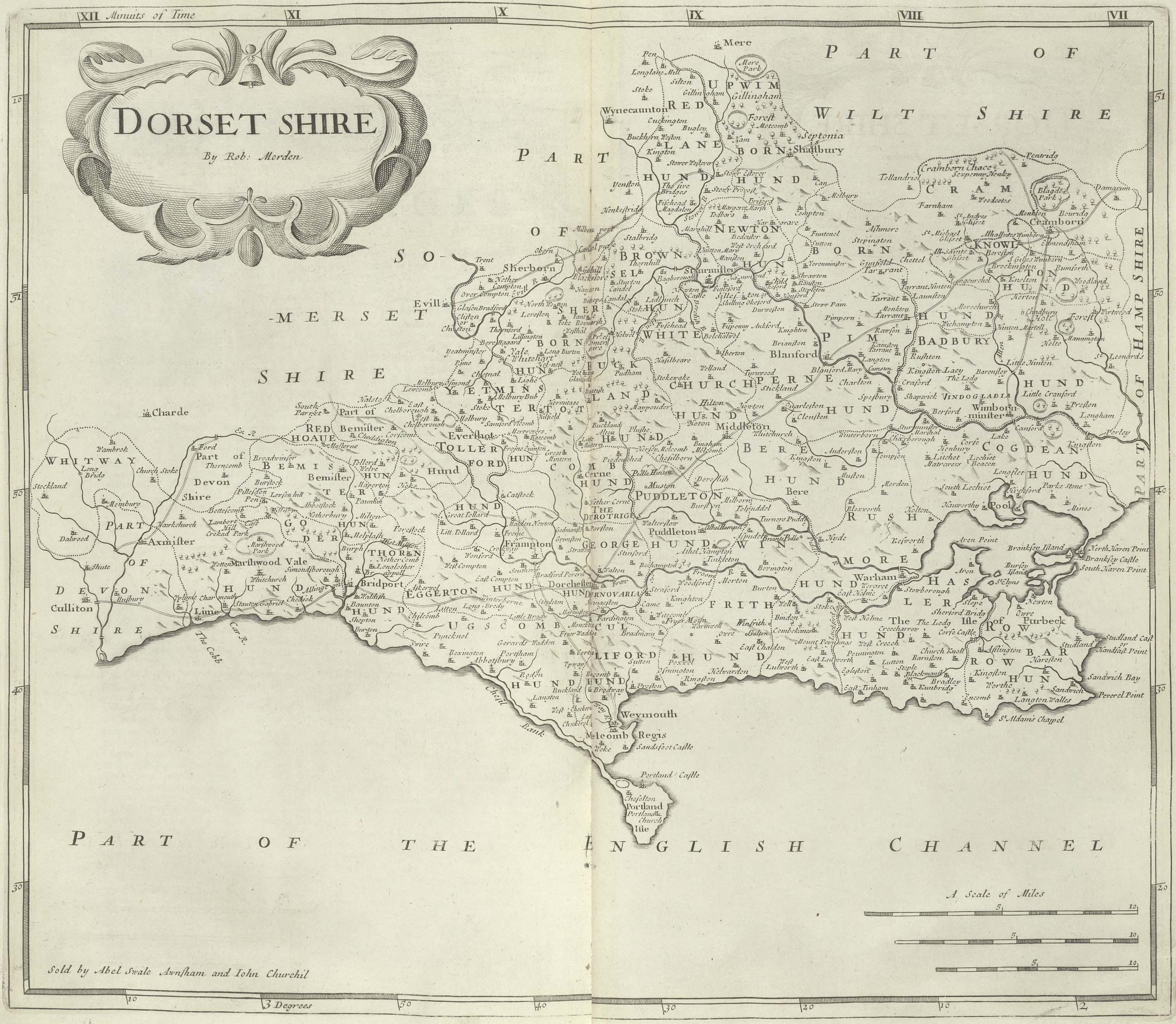
Dorset

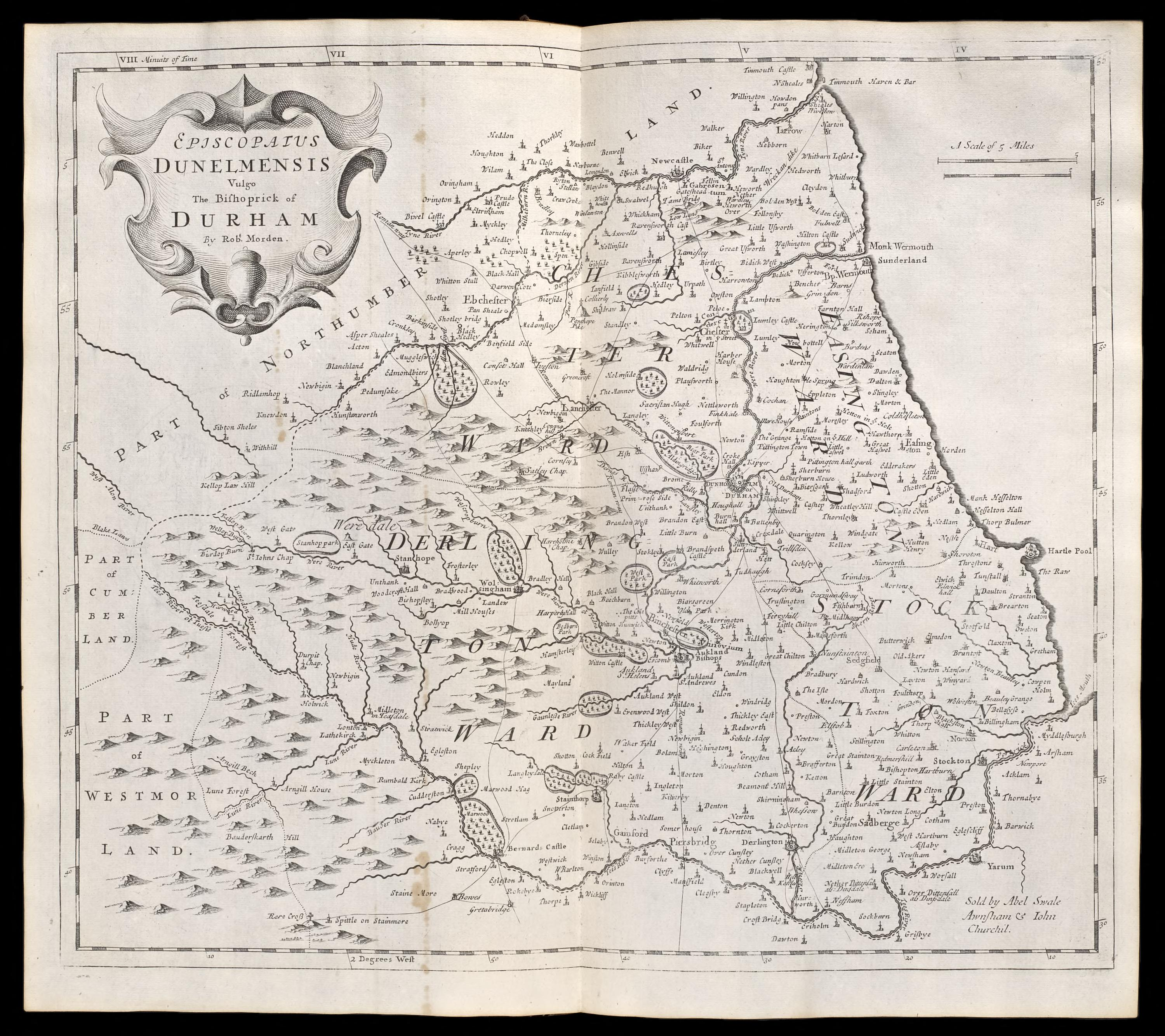
Durham

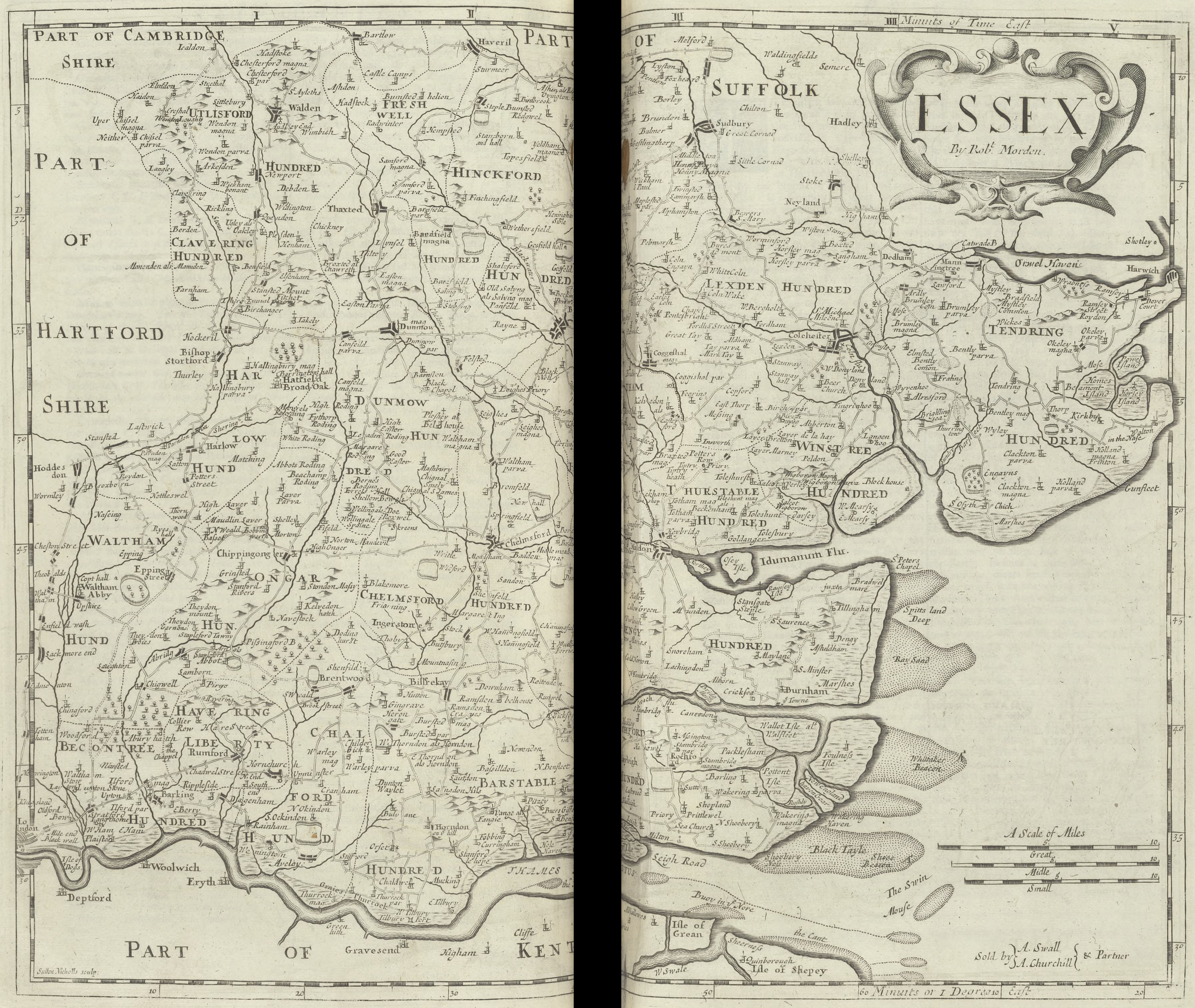
Essex

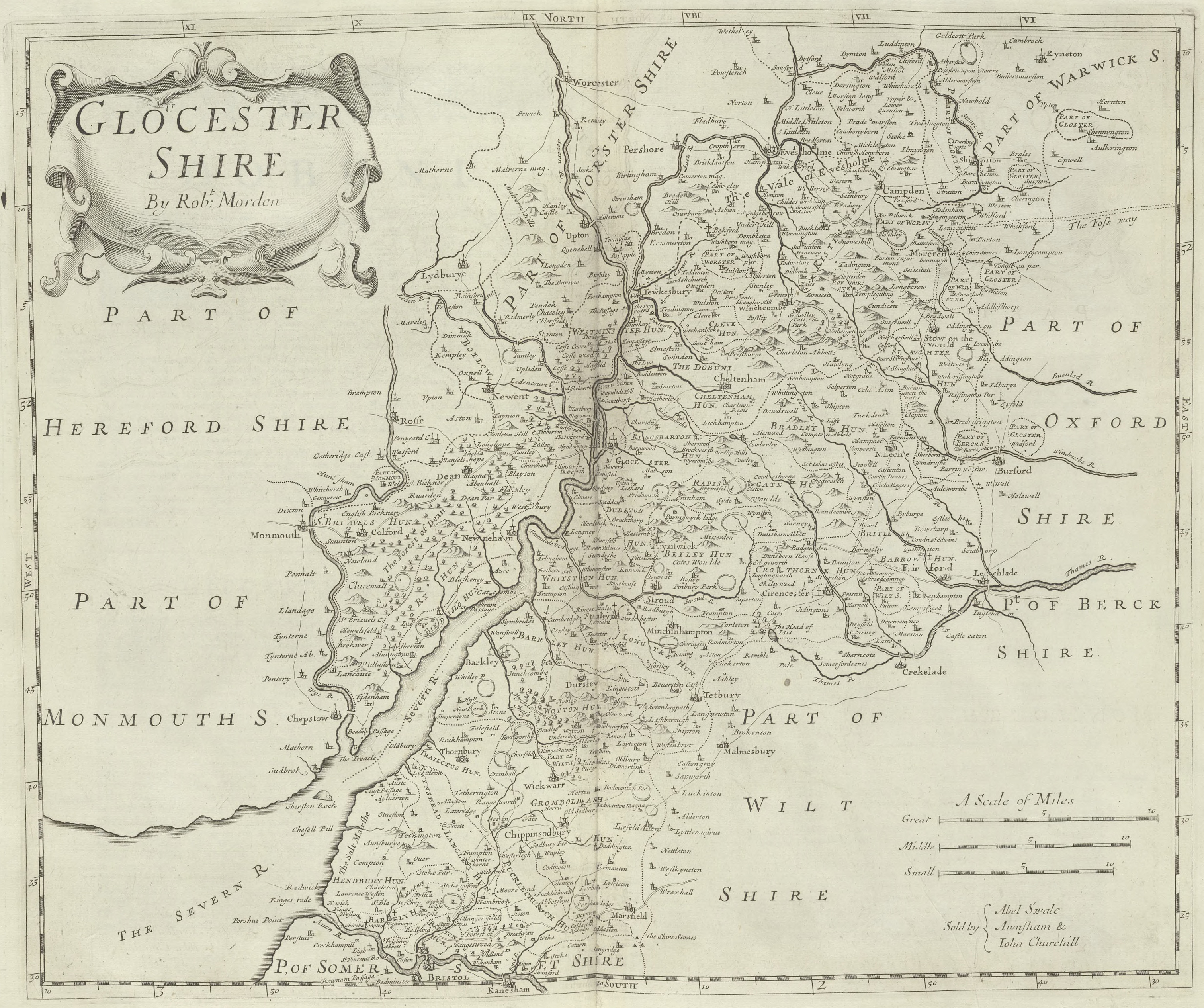
Gloucestershire

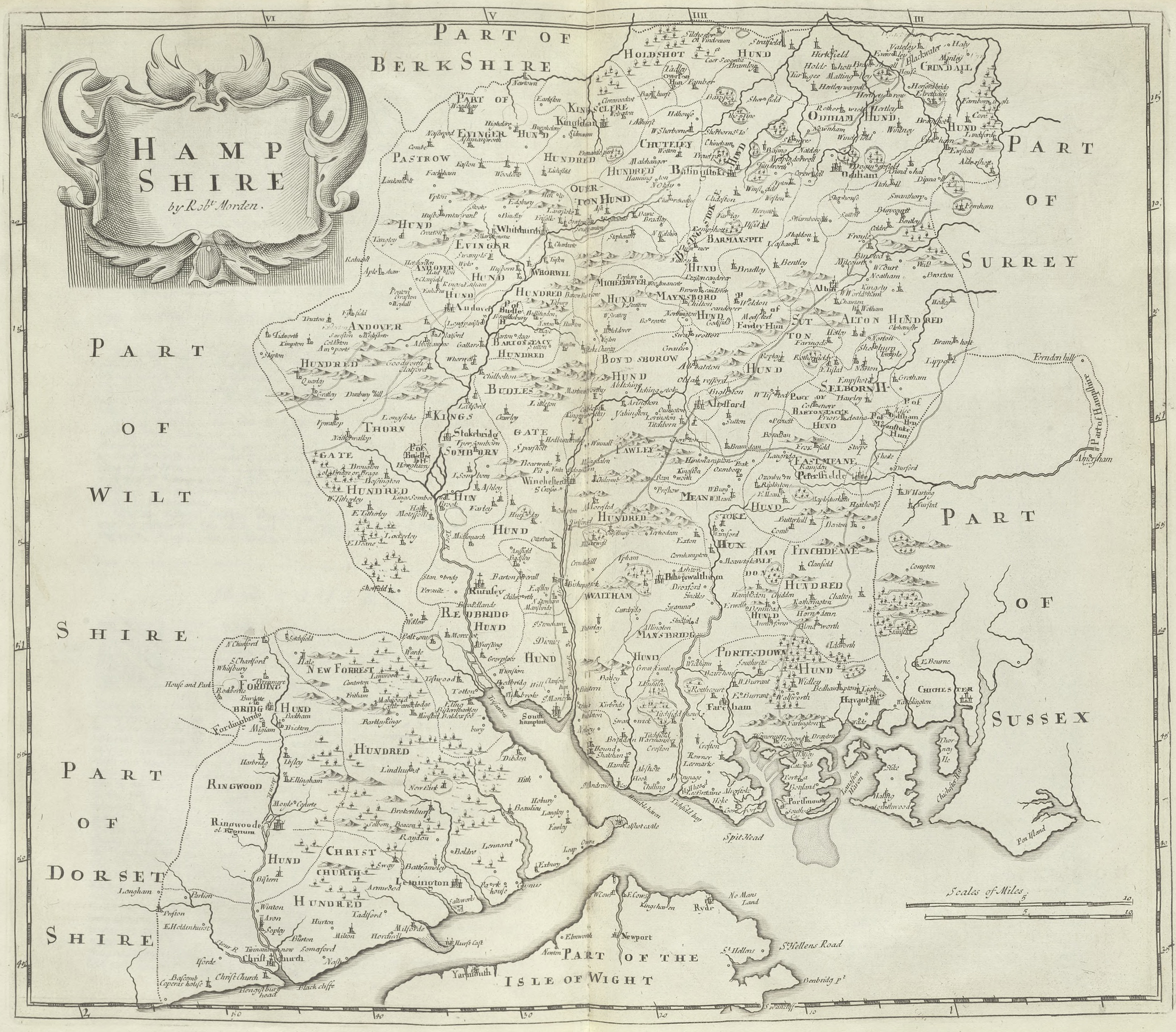
Hampshire

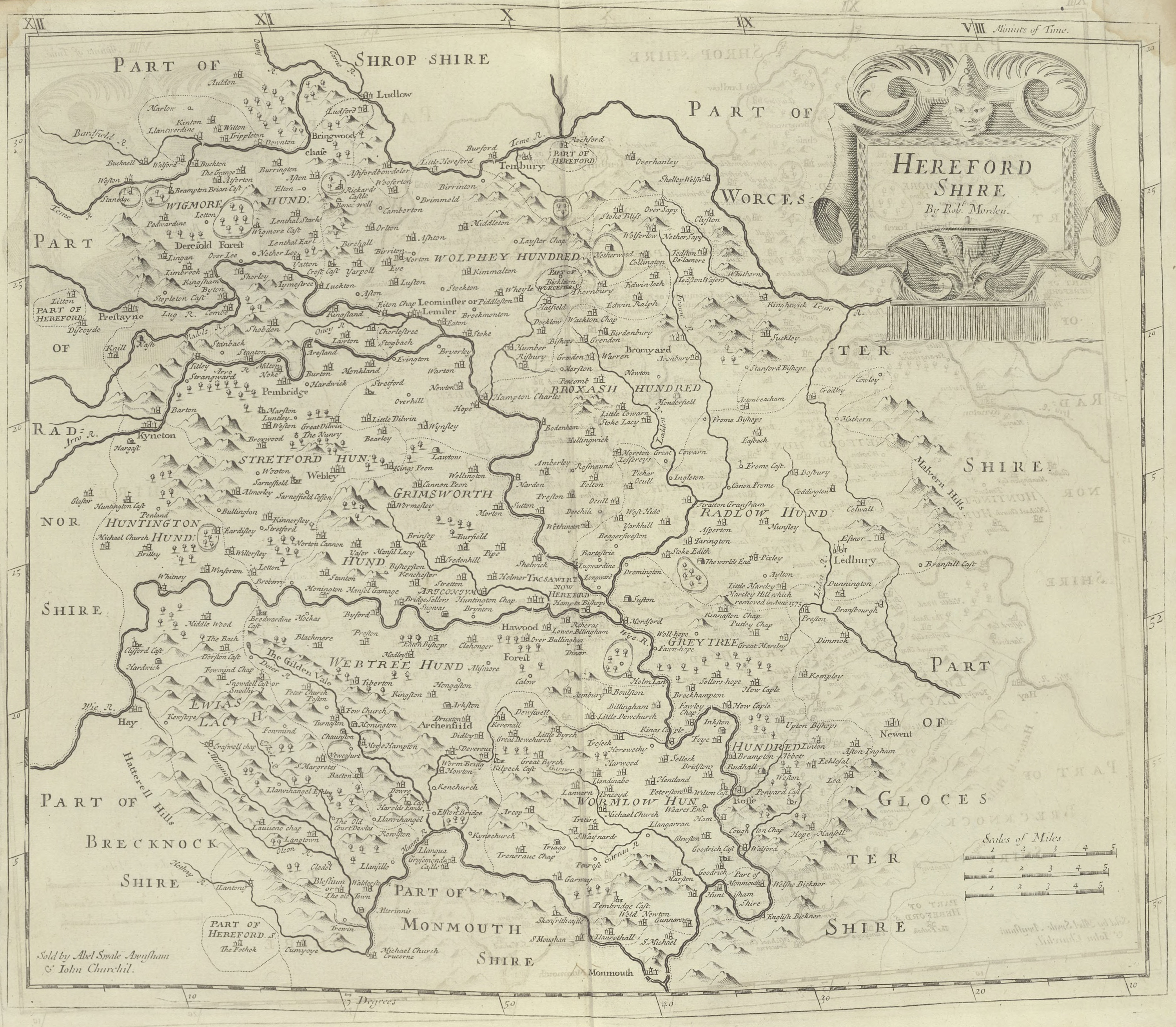
Herefordshire

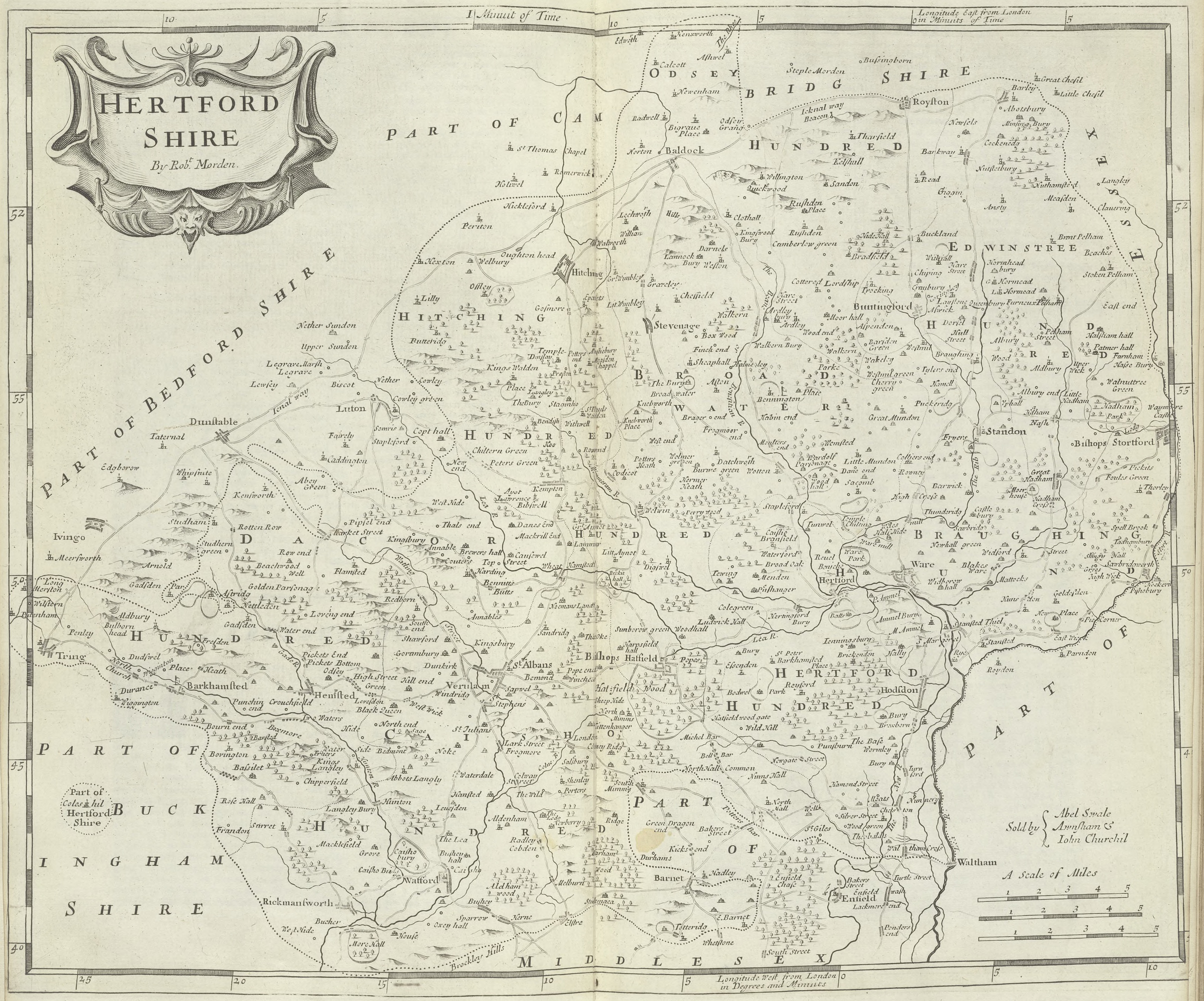
Hertfordshire

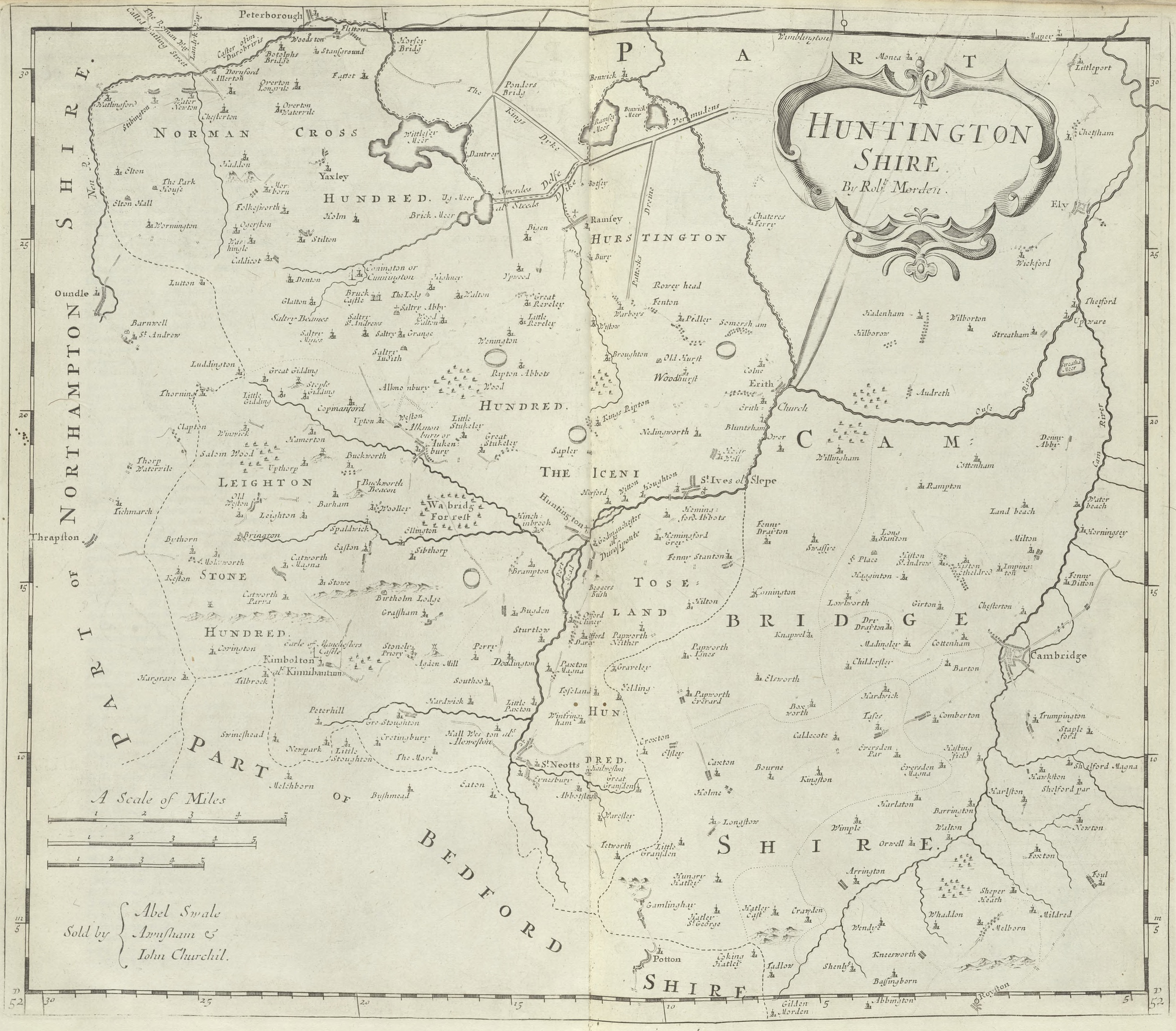
Huntingdonshire

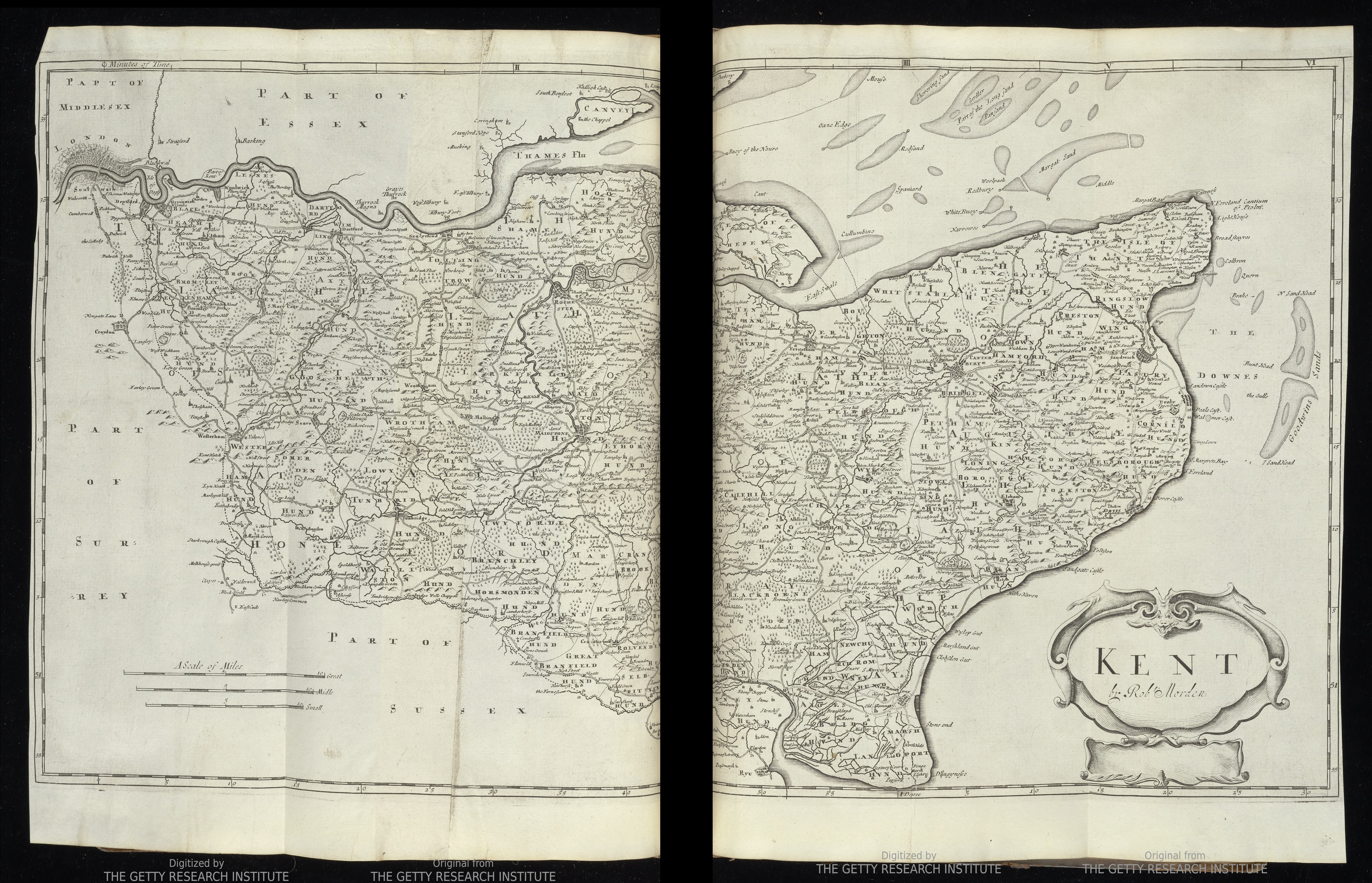
Kent

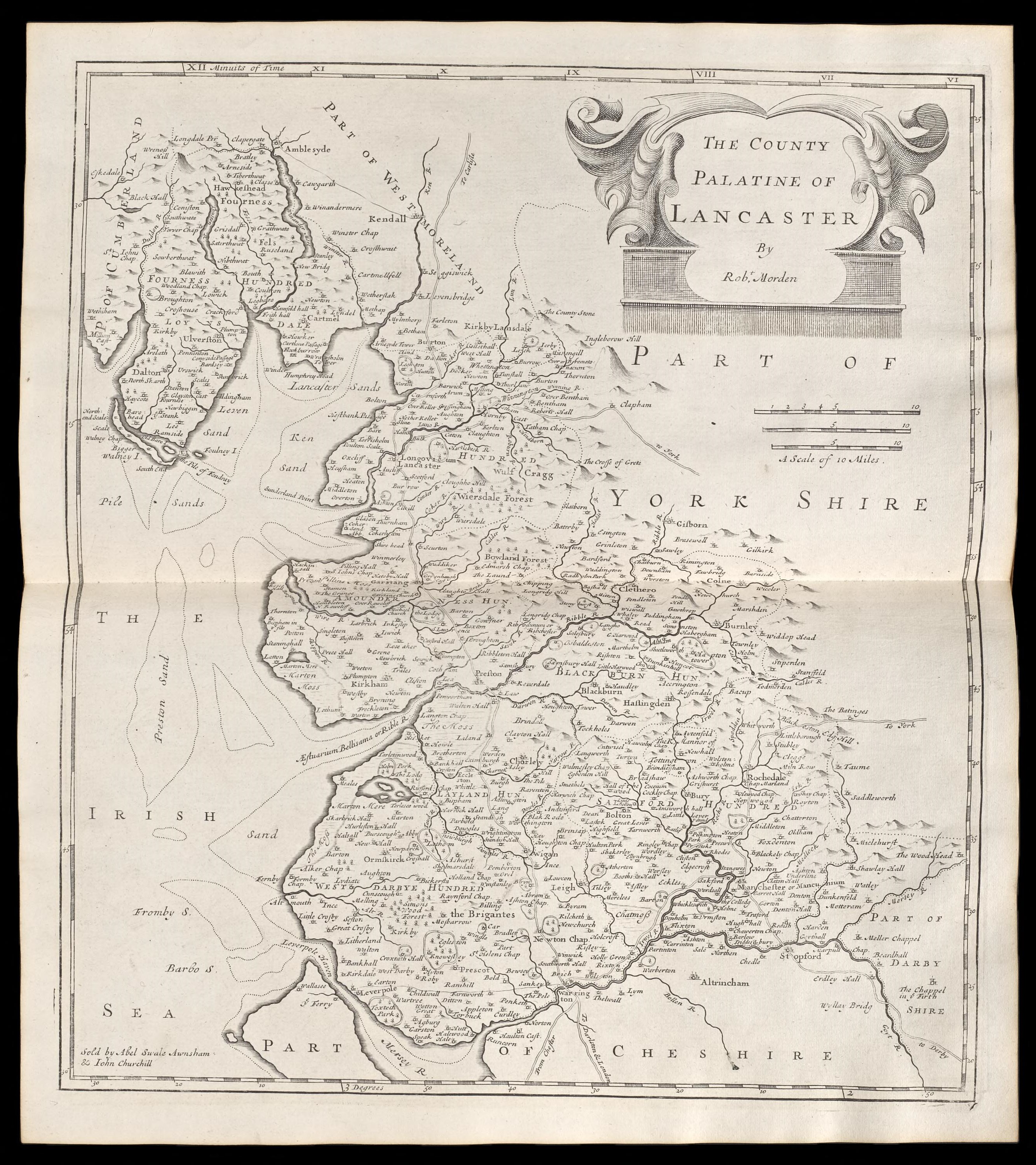
Lancashire

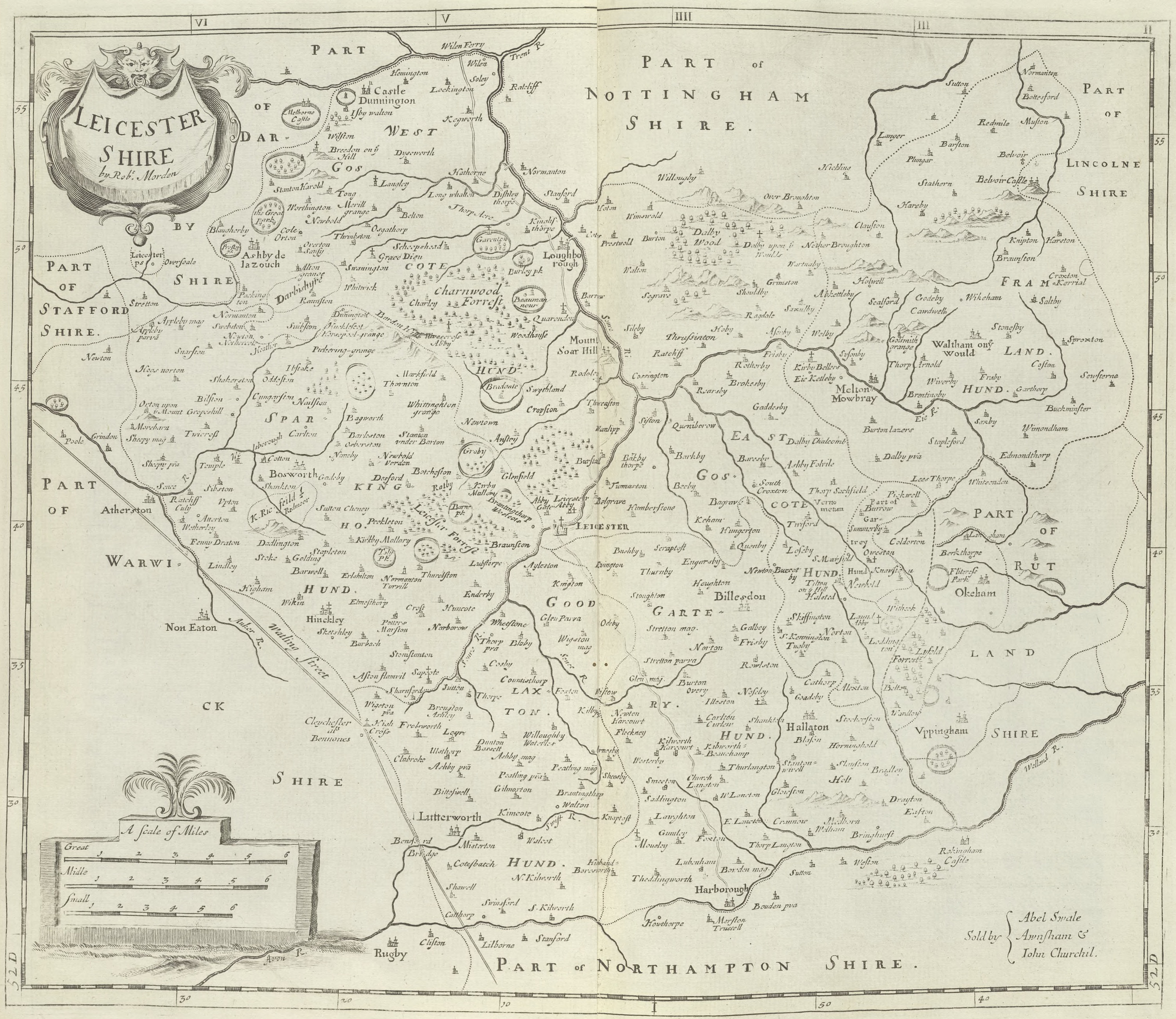
Leicestershire

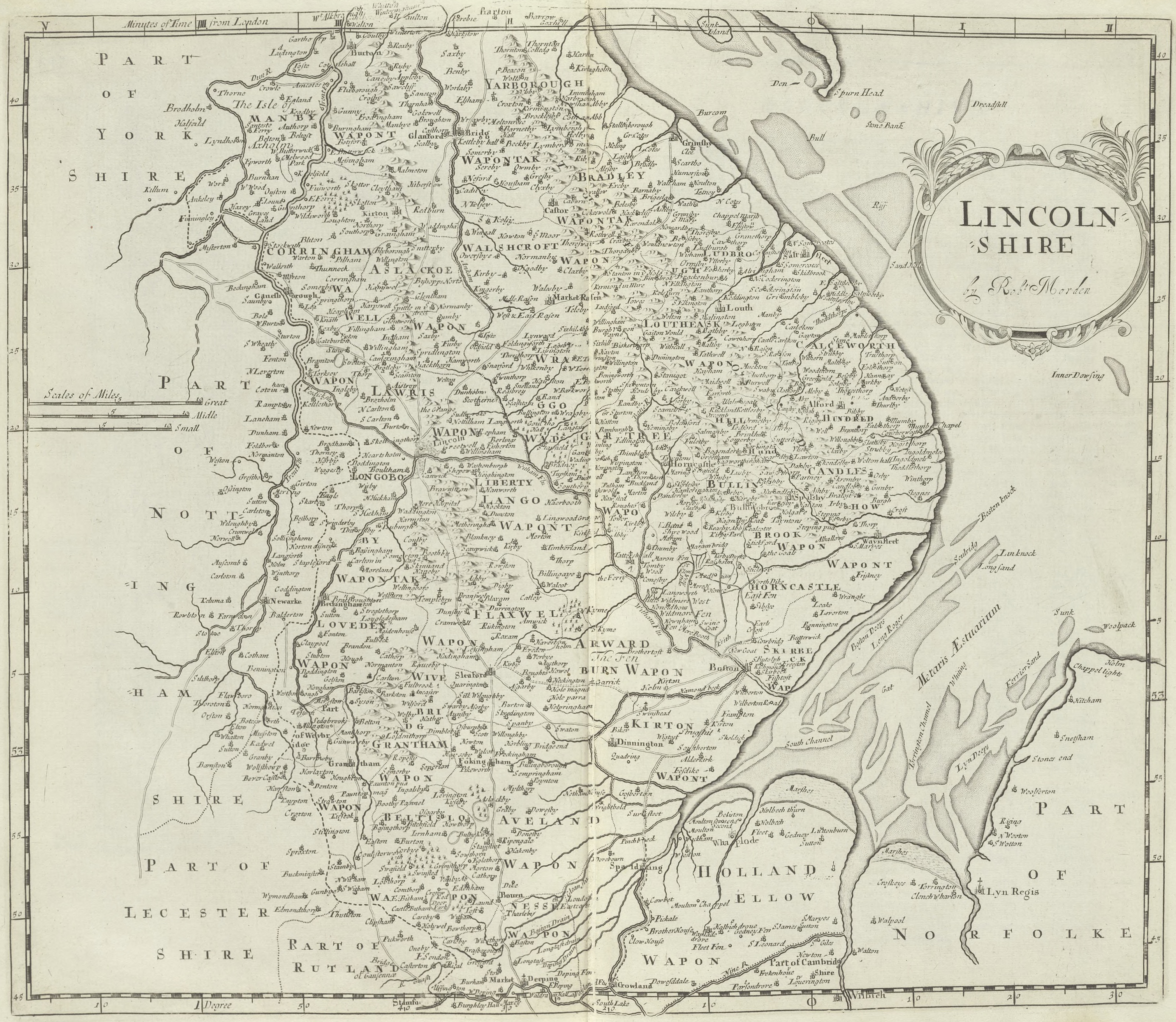
Lincolnshire

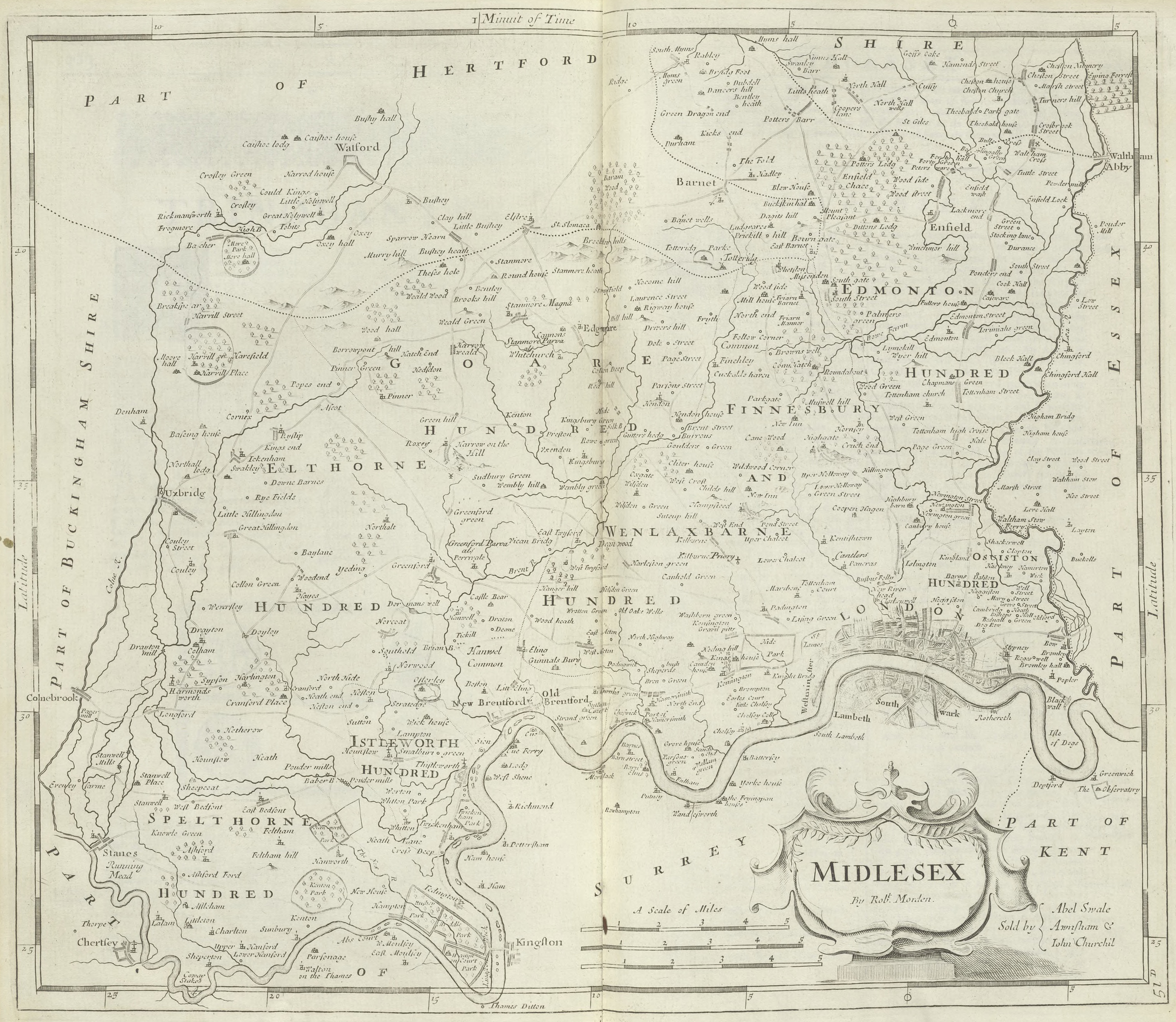
Middlesex

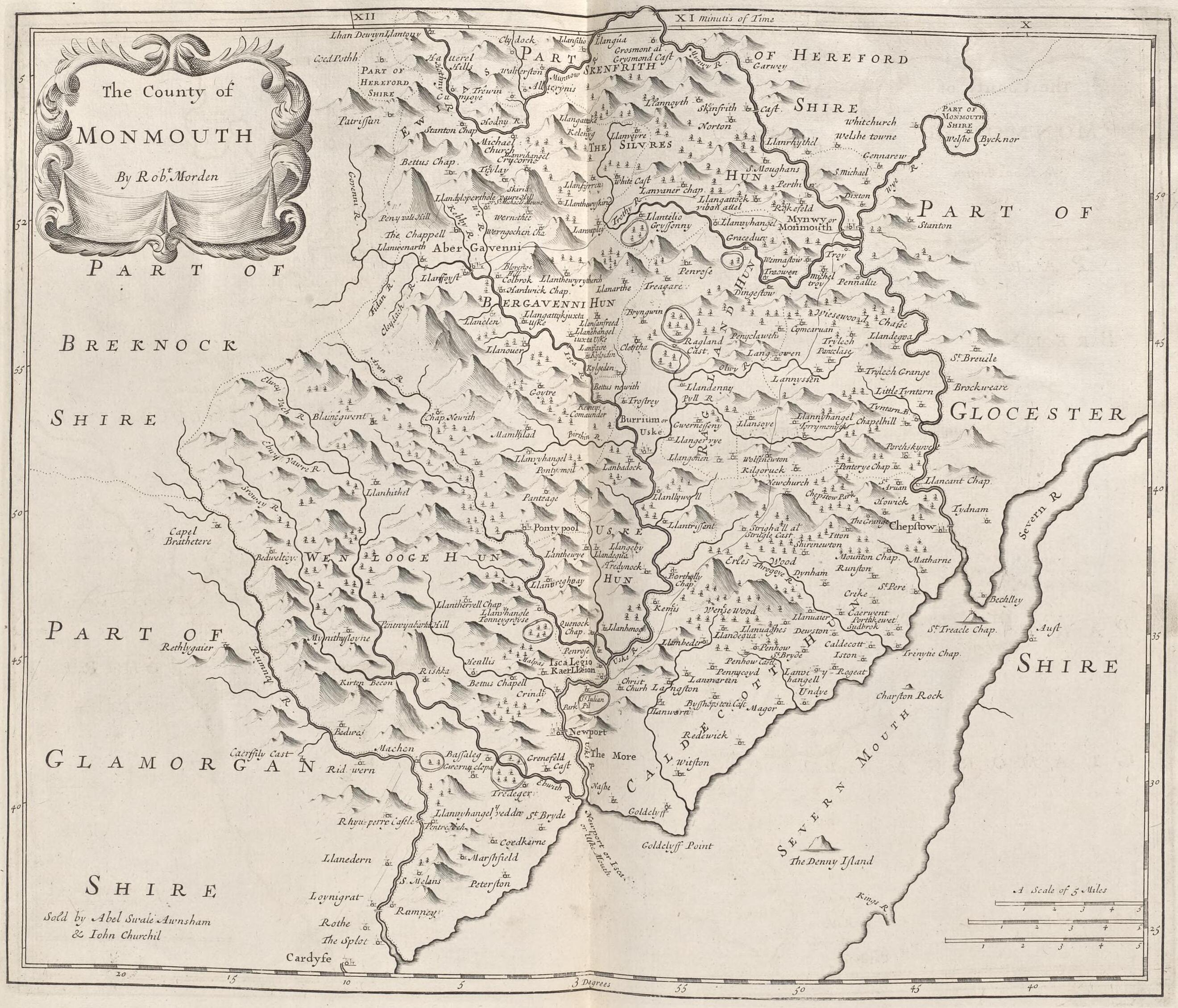
Monmouthshire

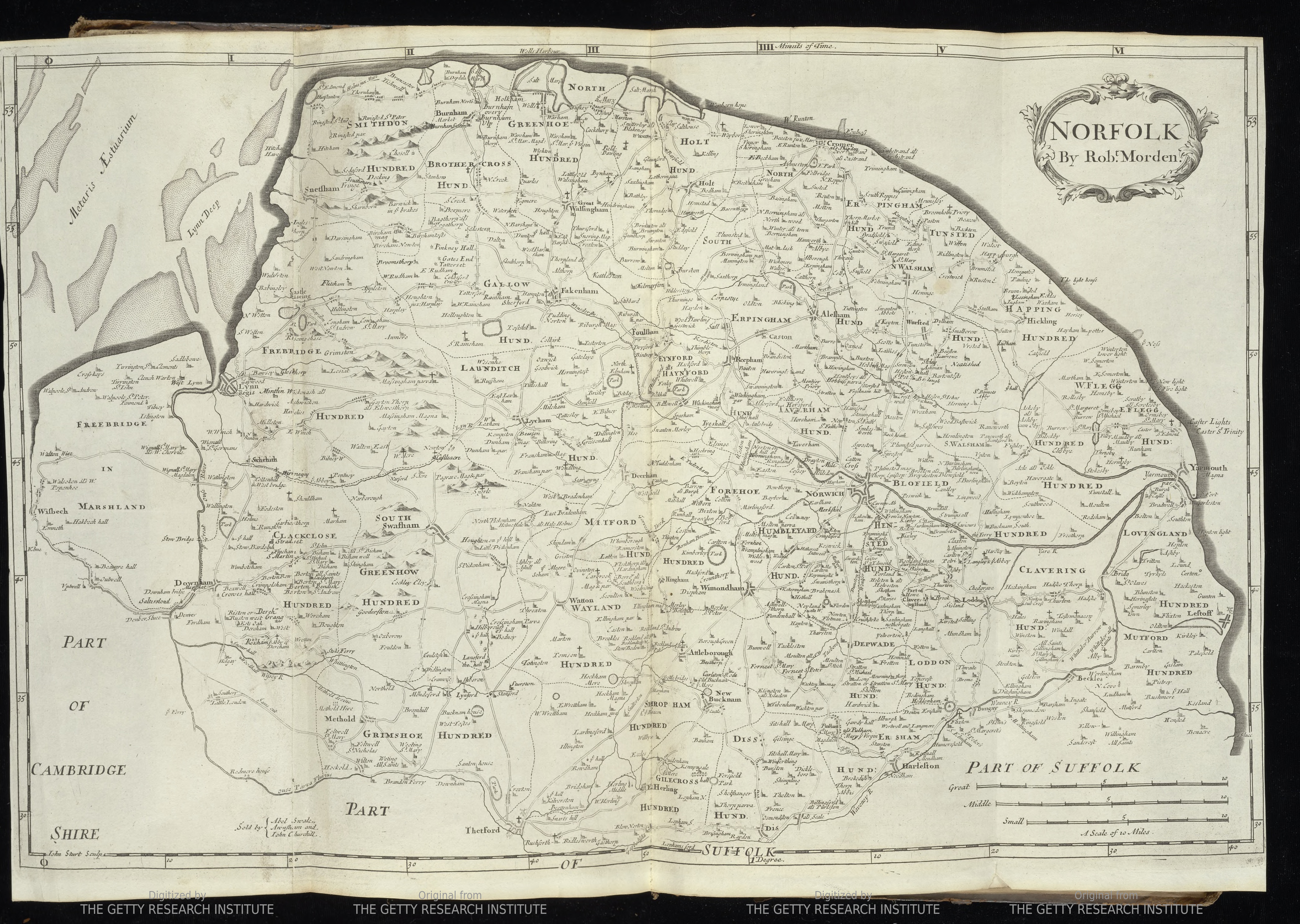
Norfolk

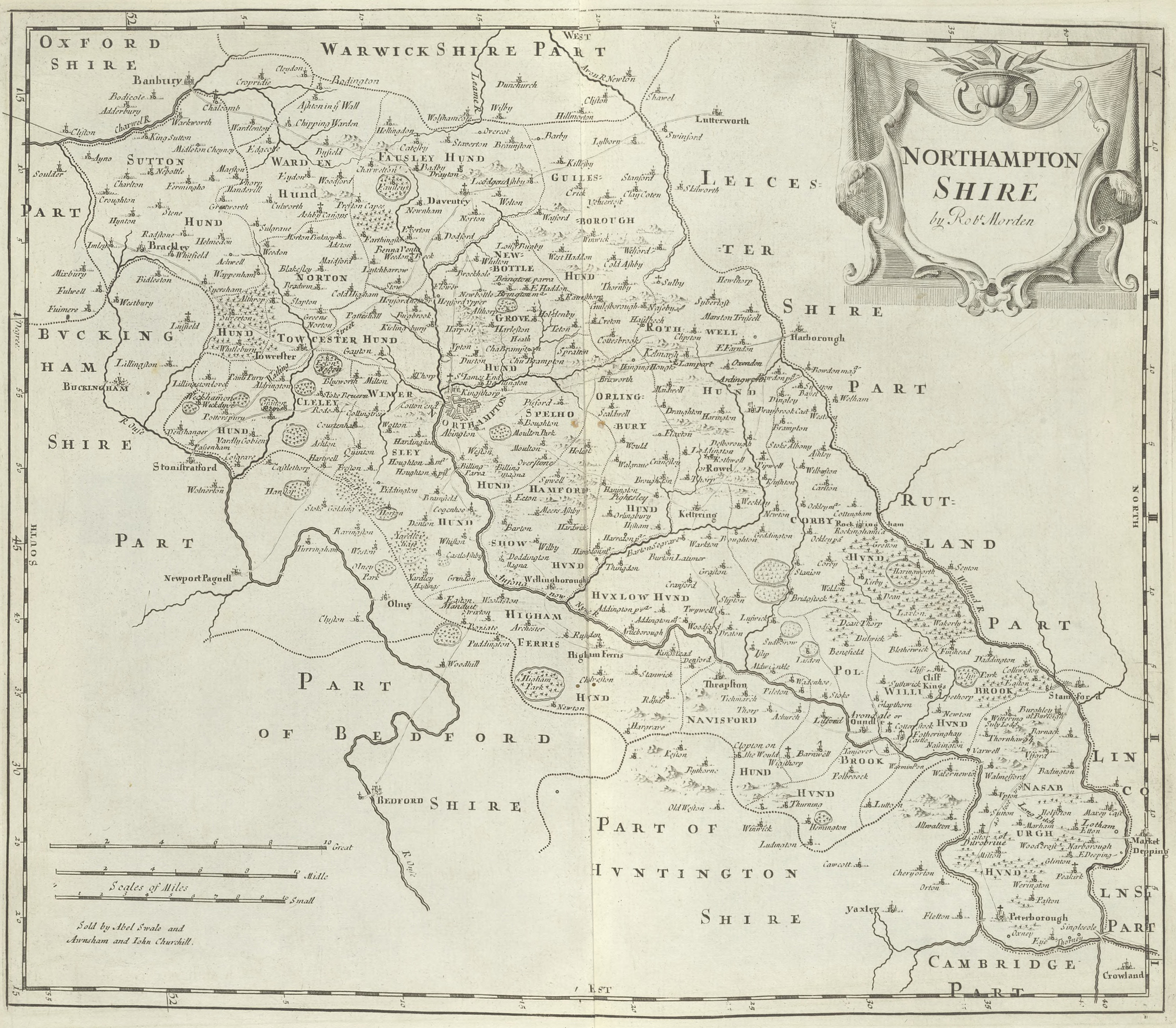
Northamptonshire

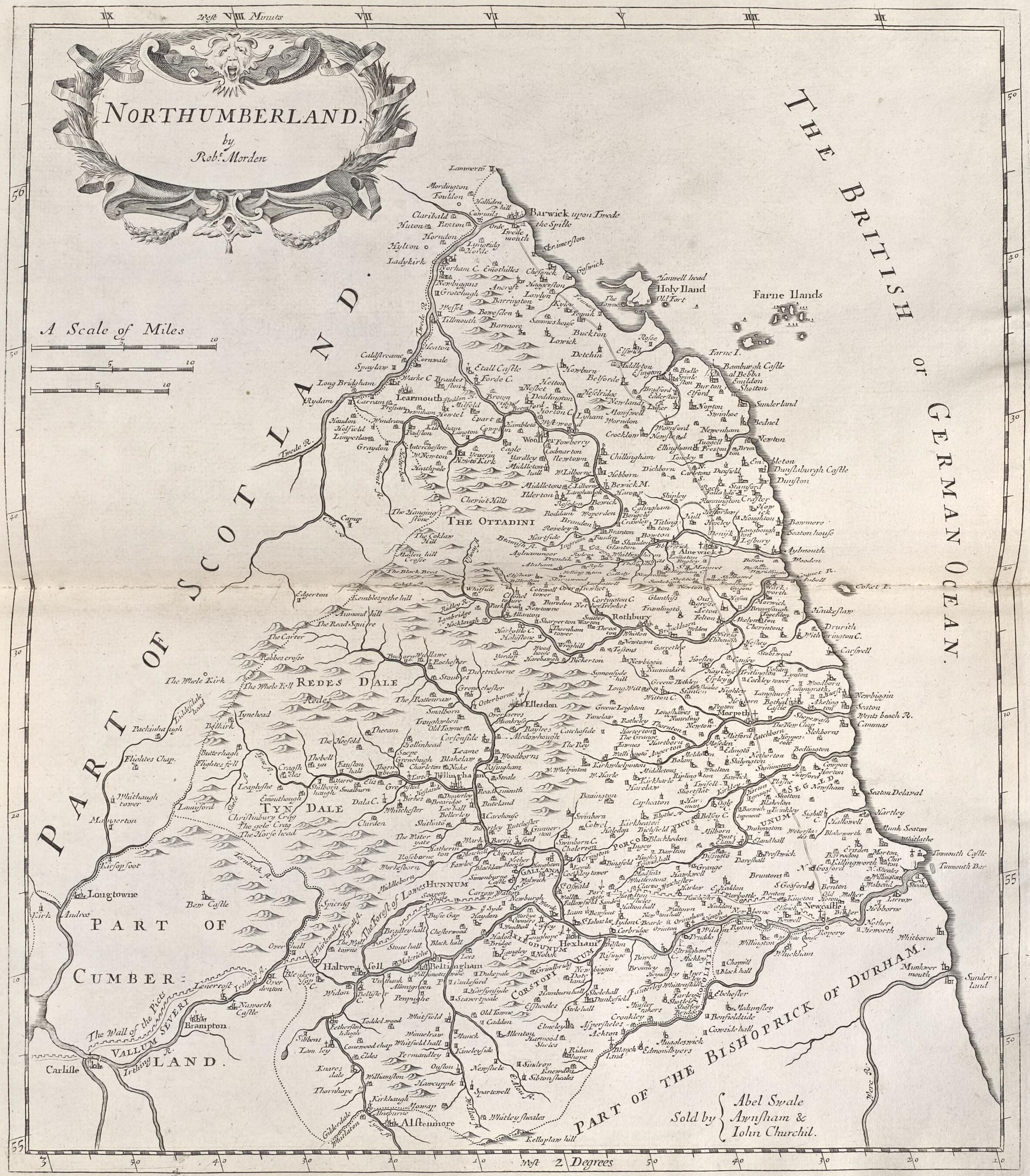
Northumberland

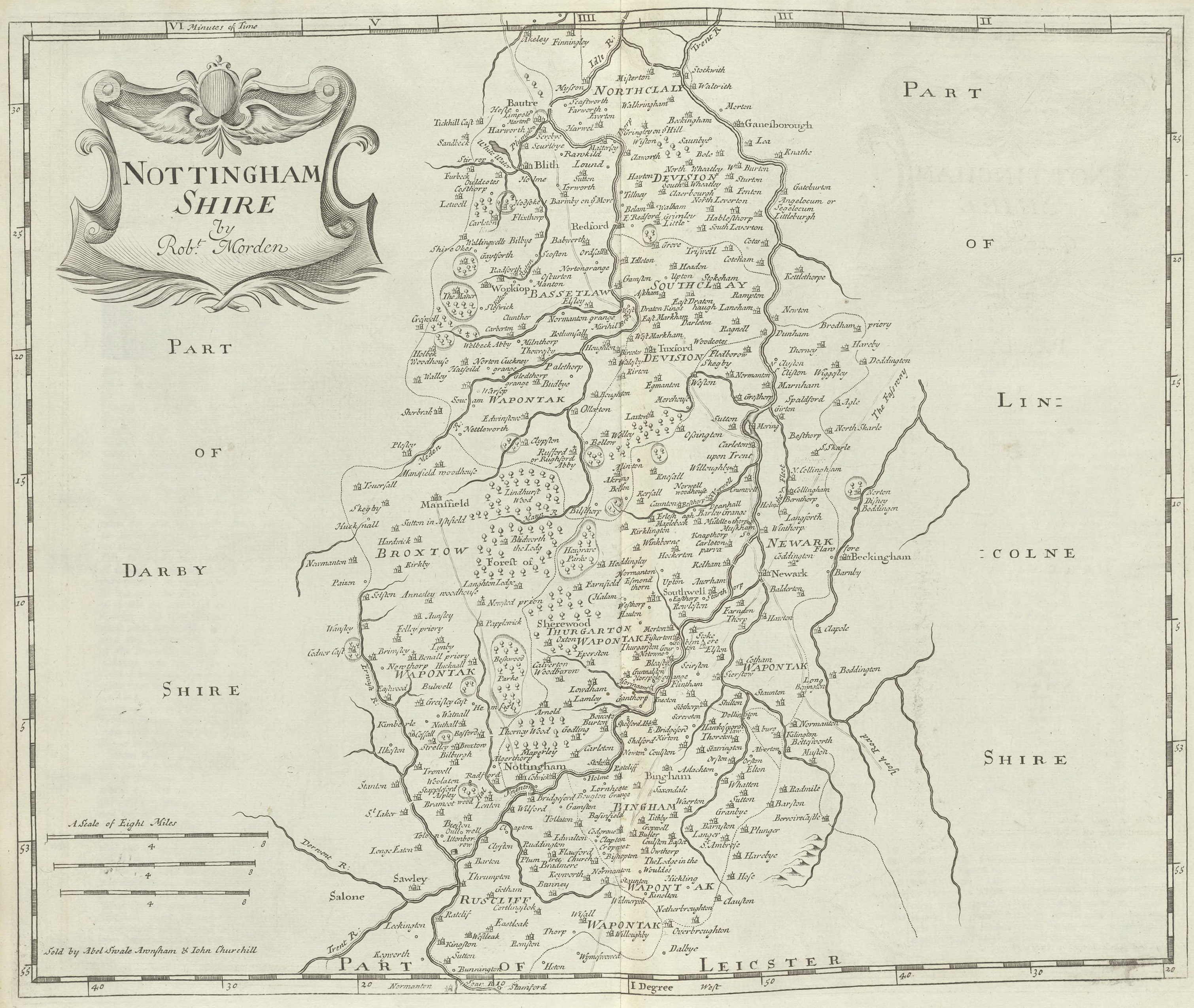
Nottinghamshire

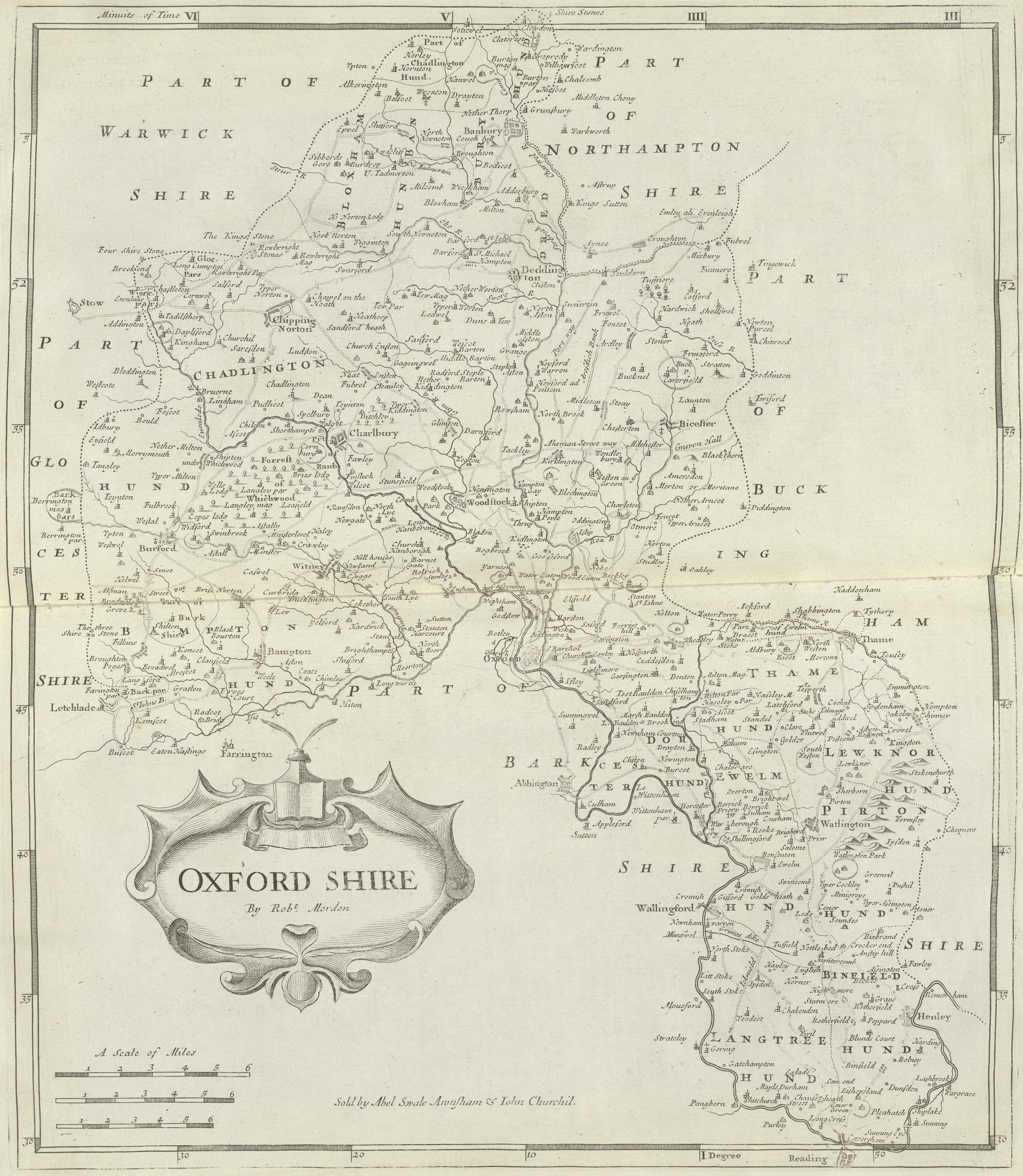
Oxfordshire

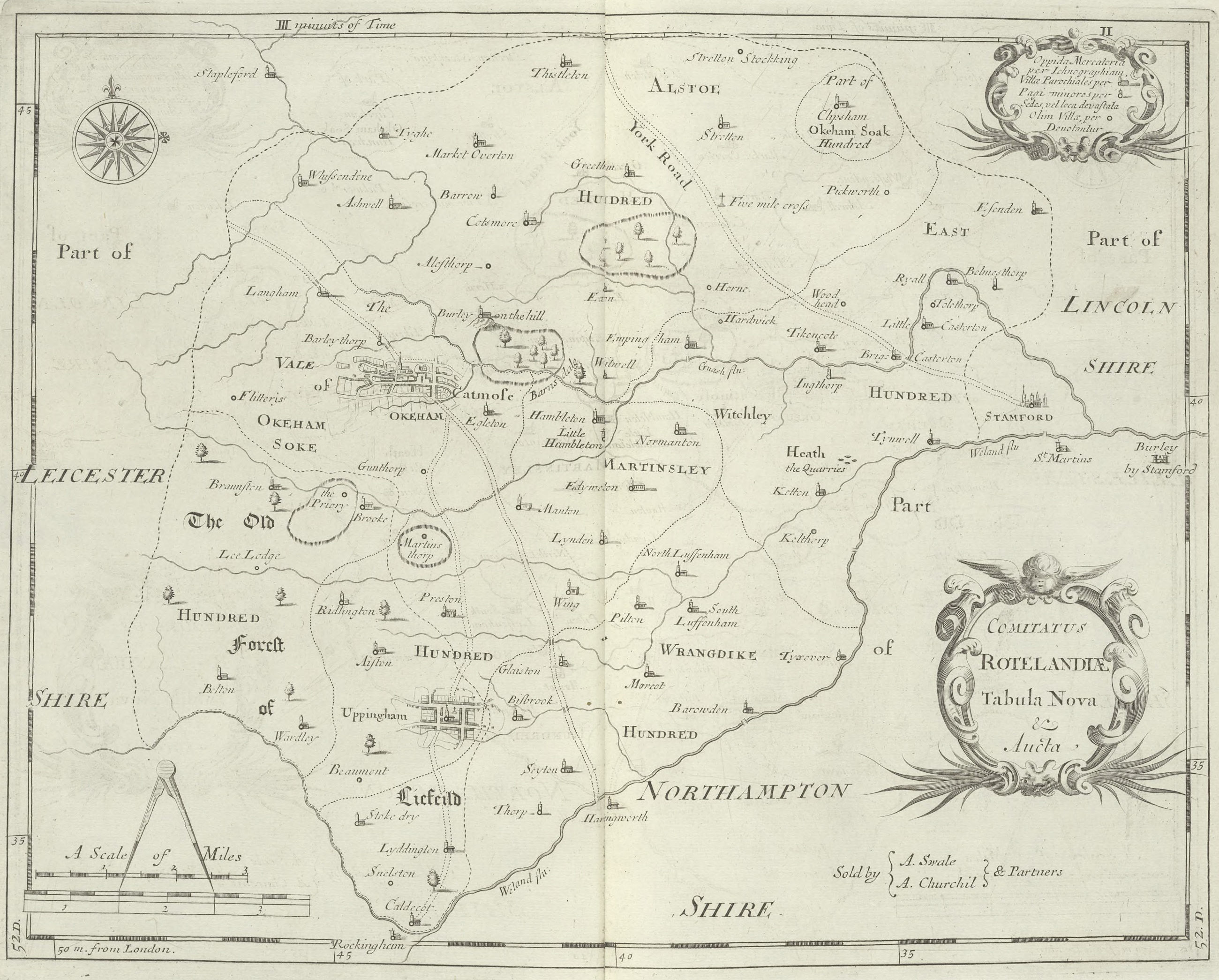
Rutland

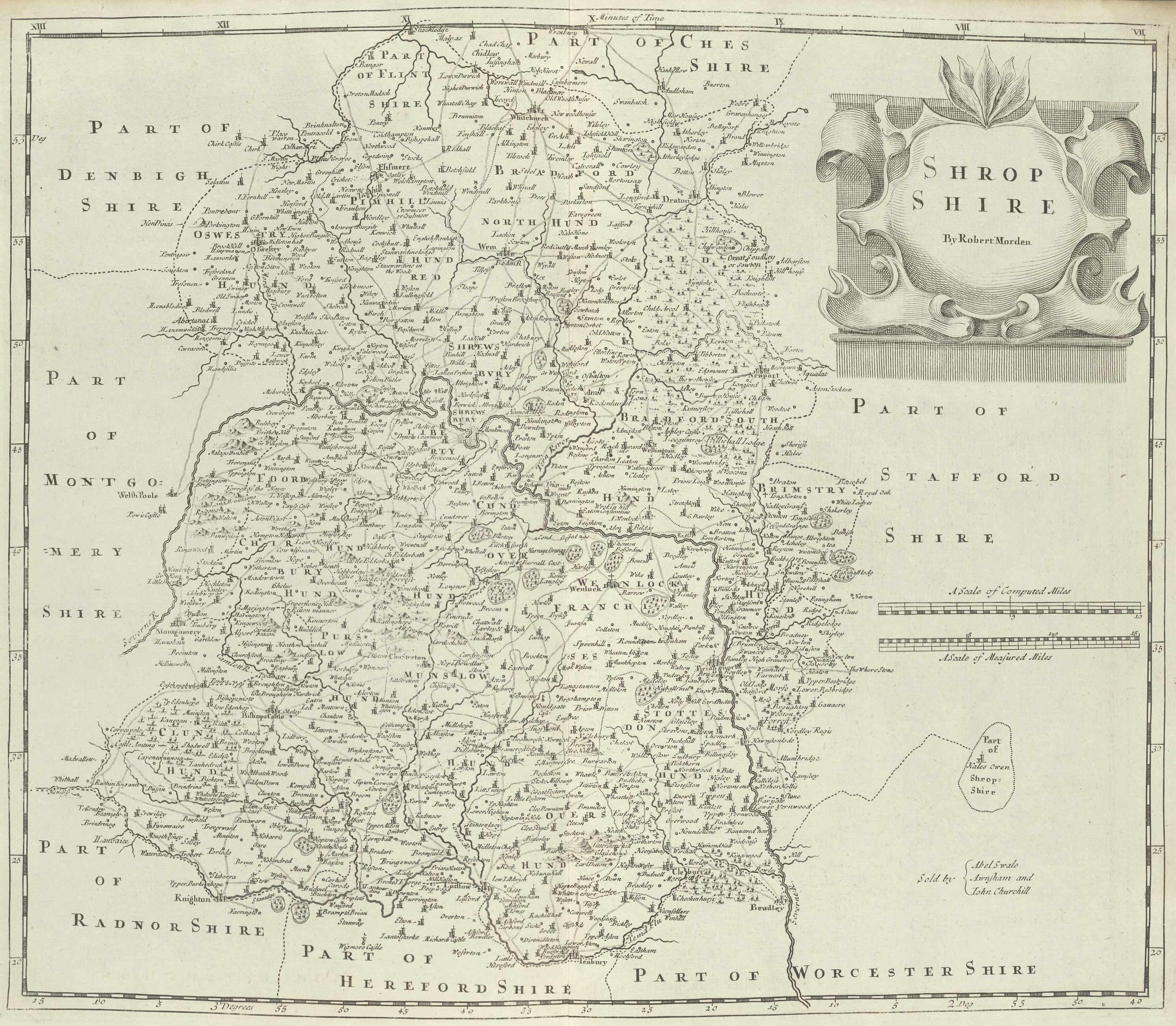
Shropshire

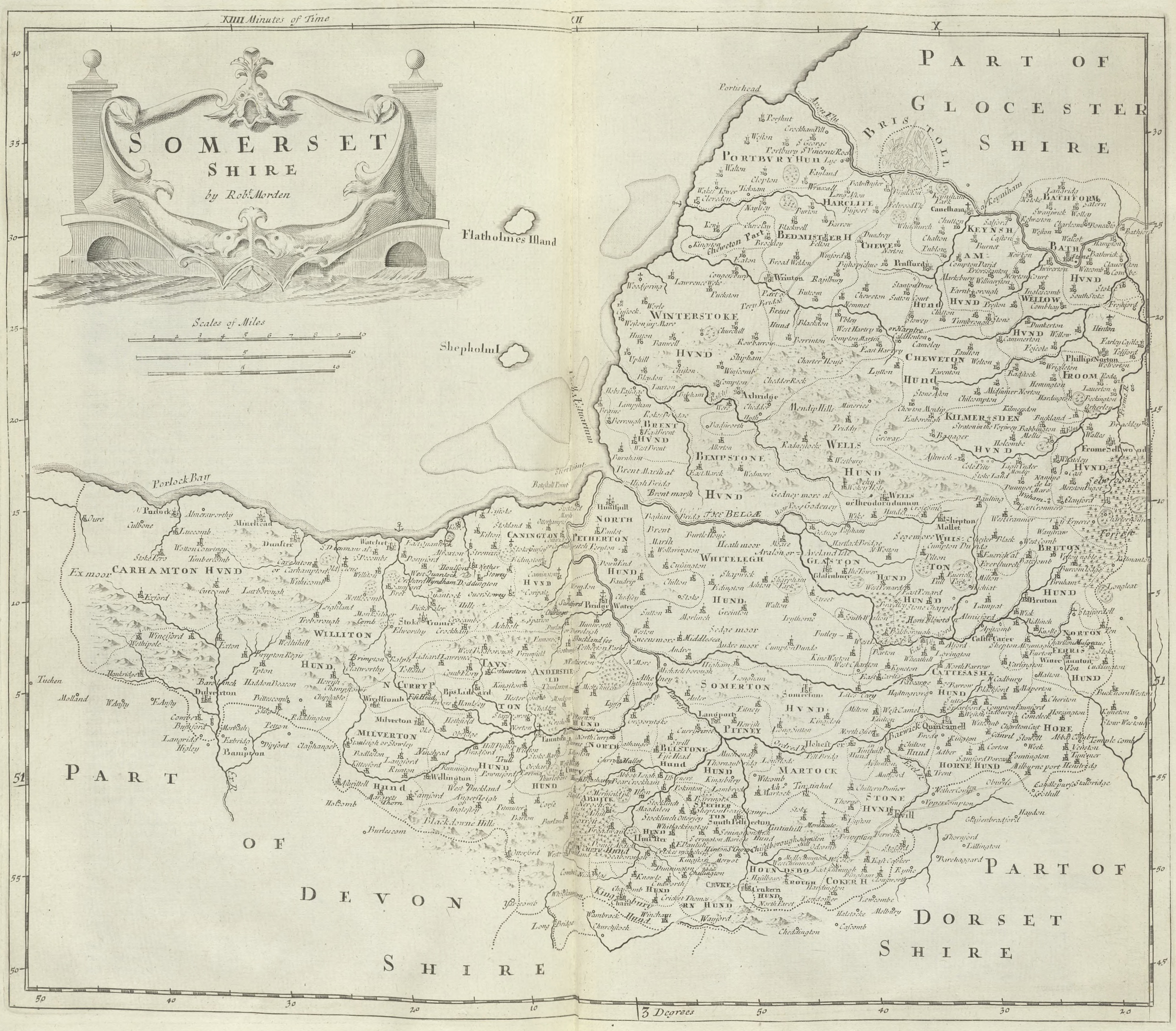
Somerset

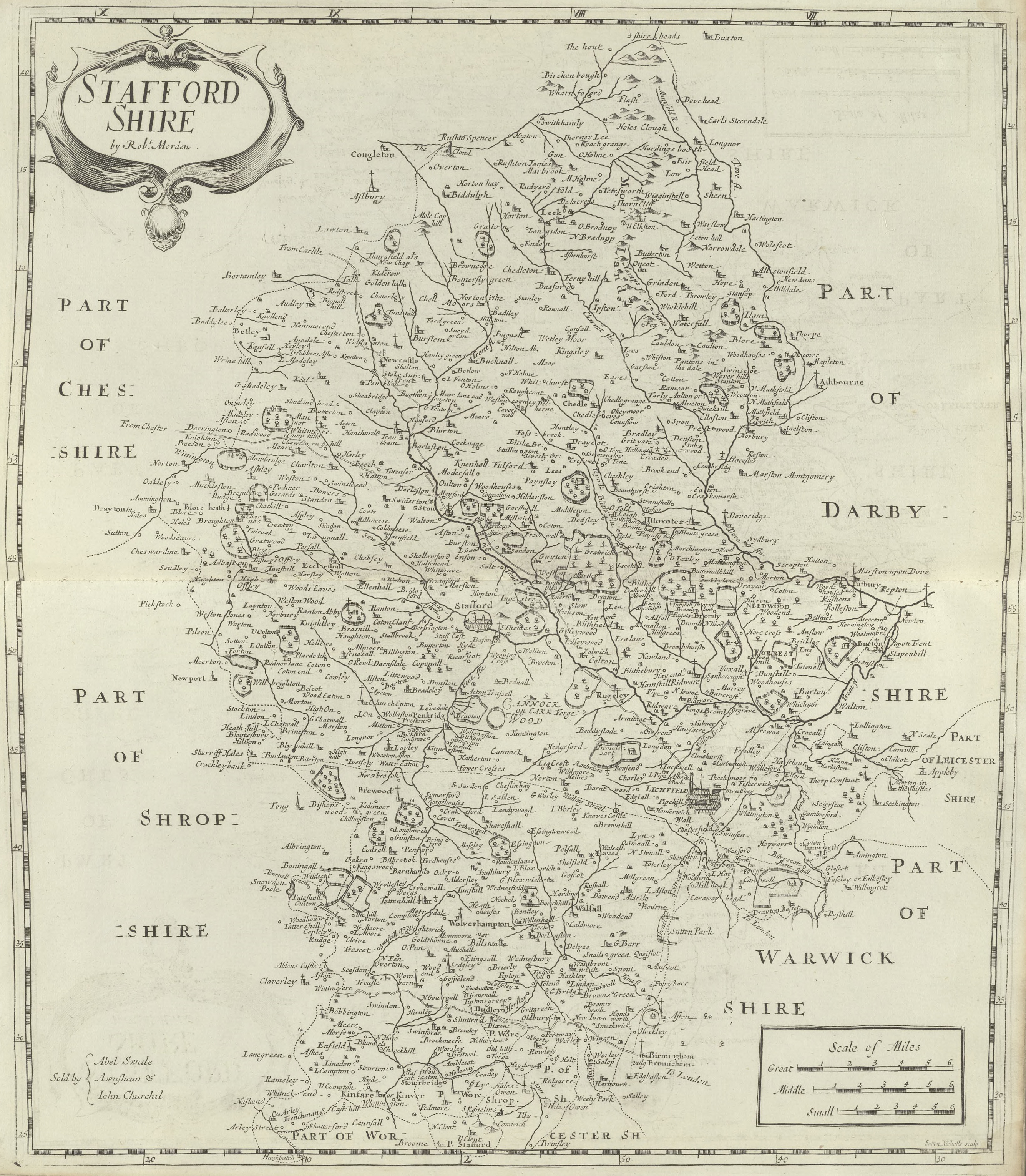
Staffordshire

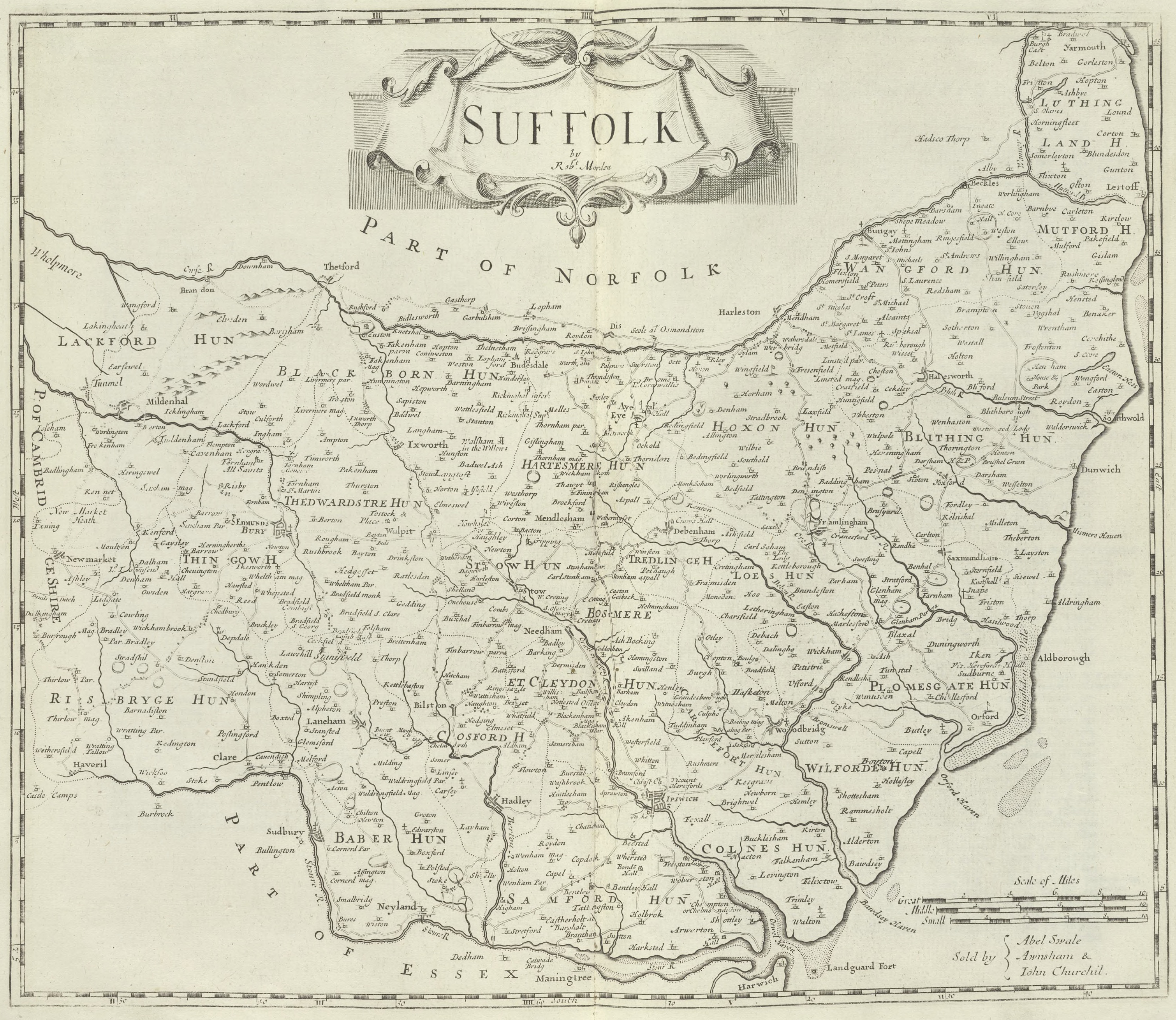
Suffolk

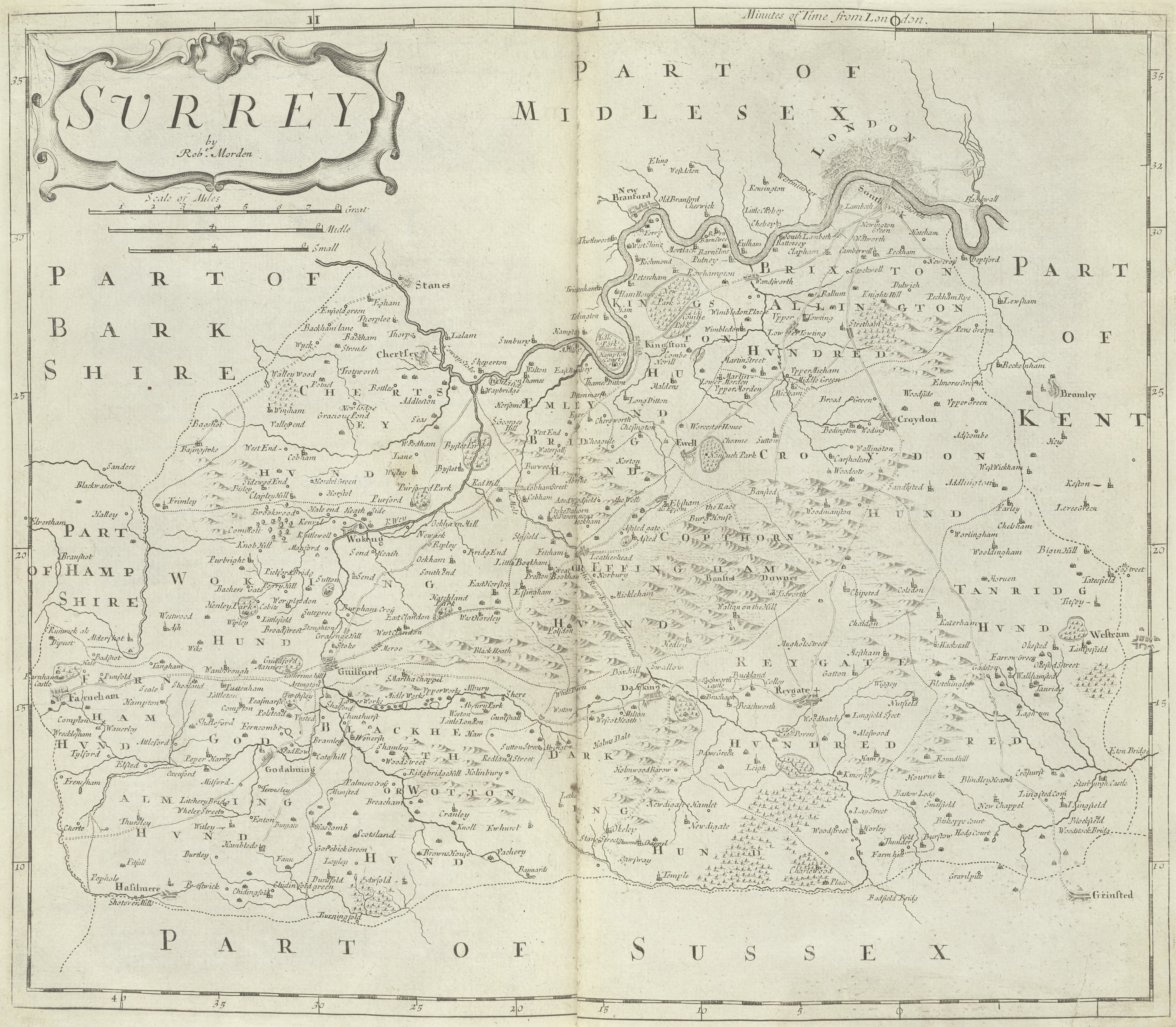
Surrey

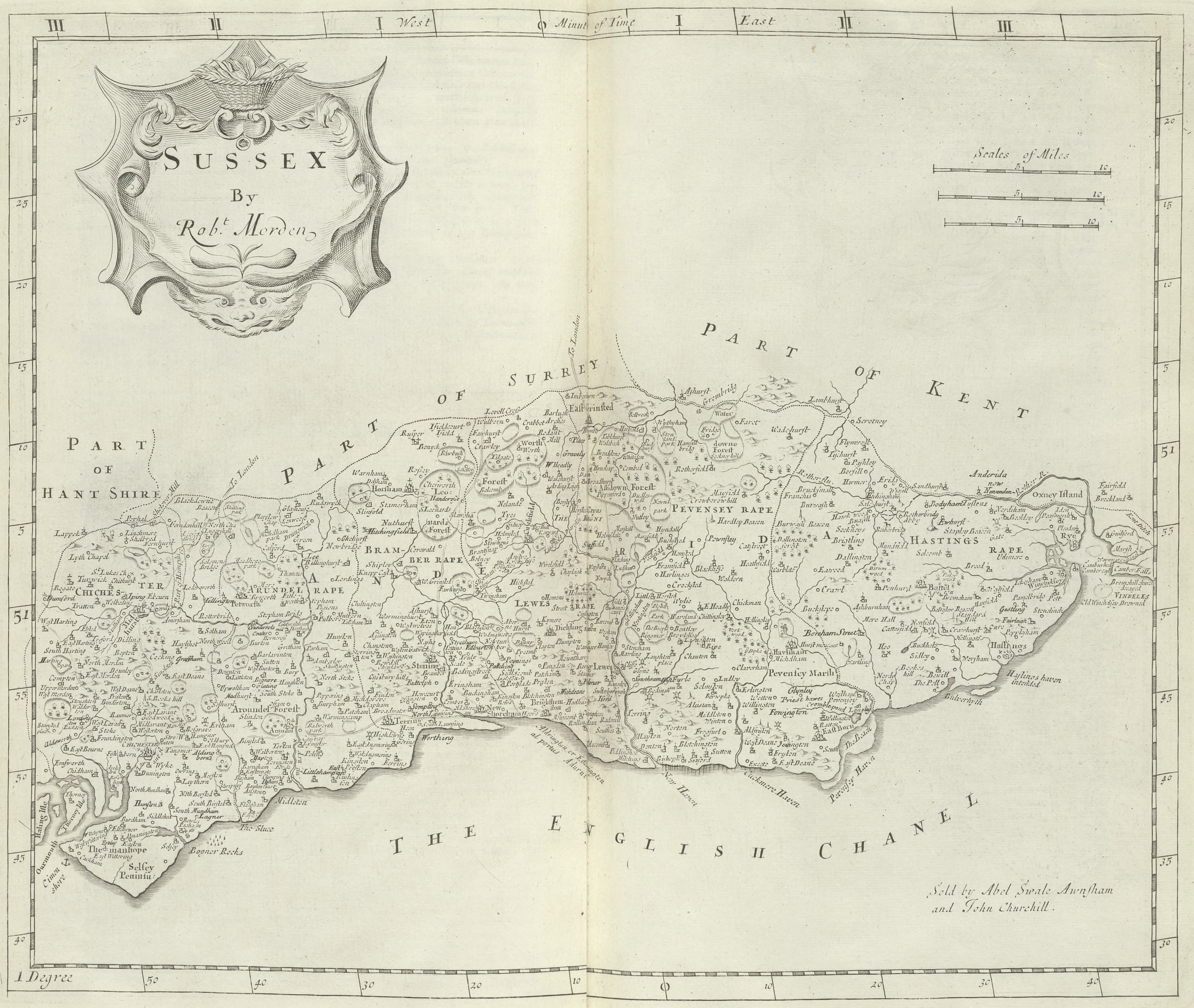
Sussex

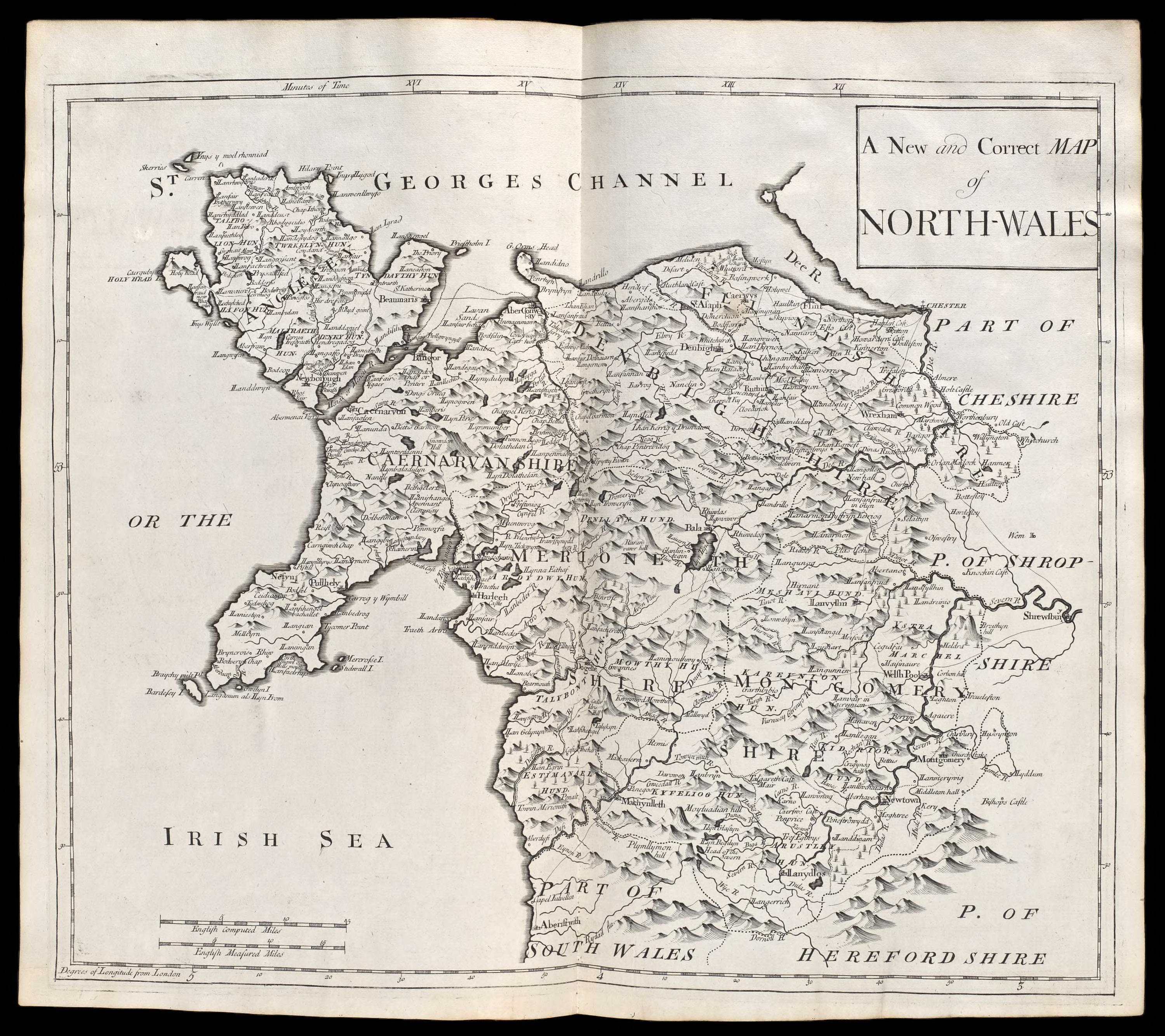
Wales (North)

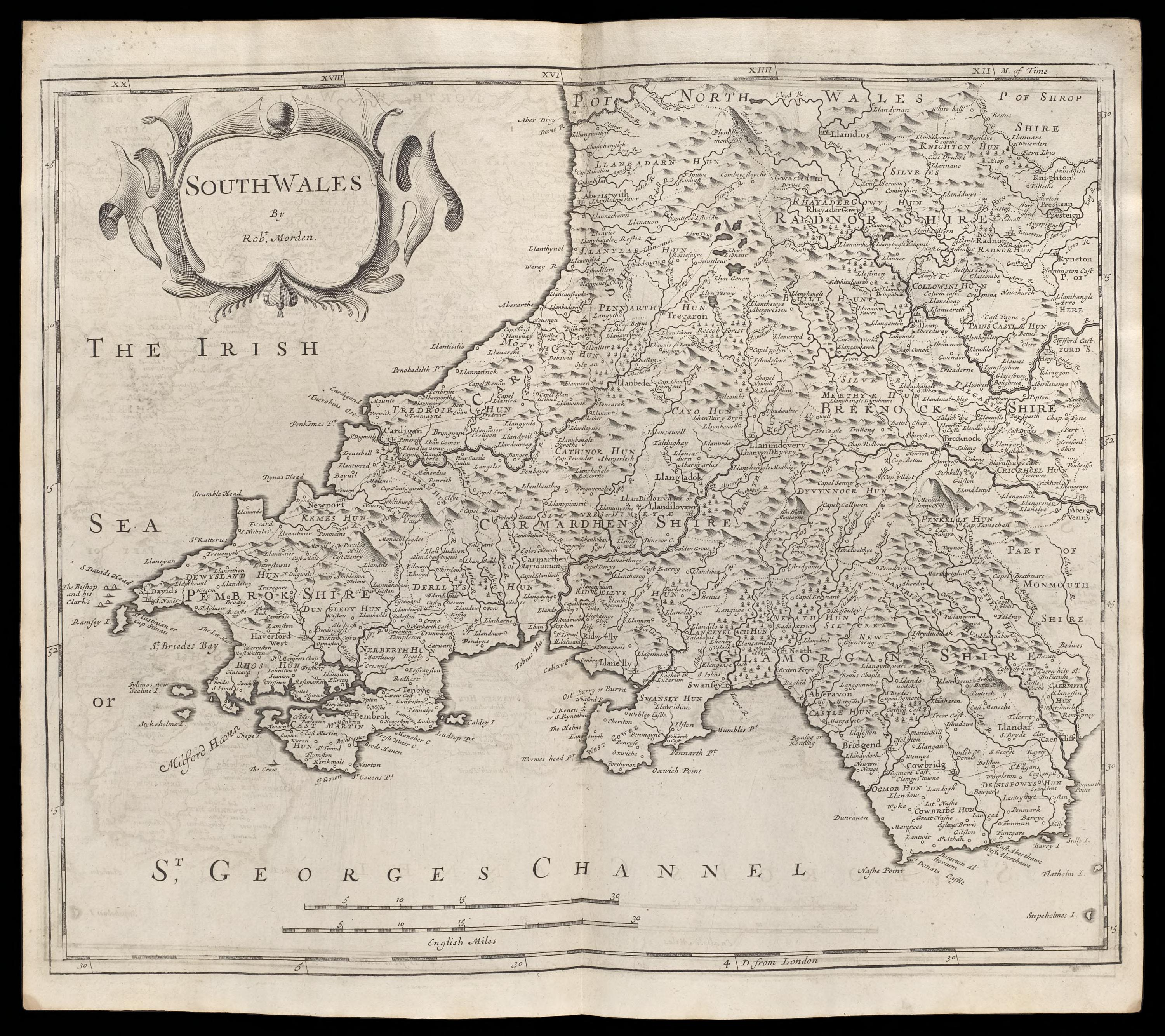
Wales (South)

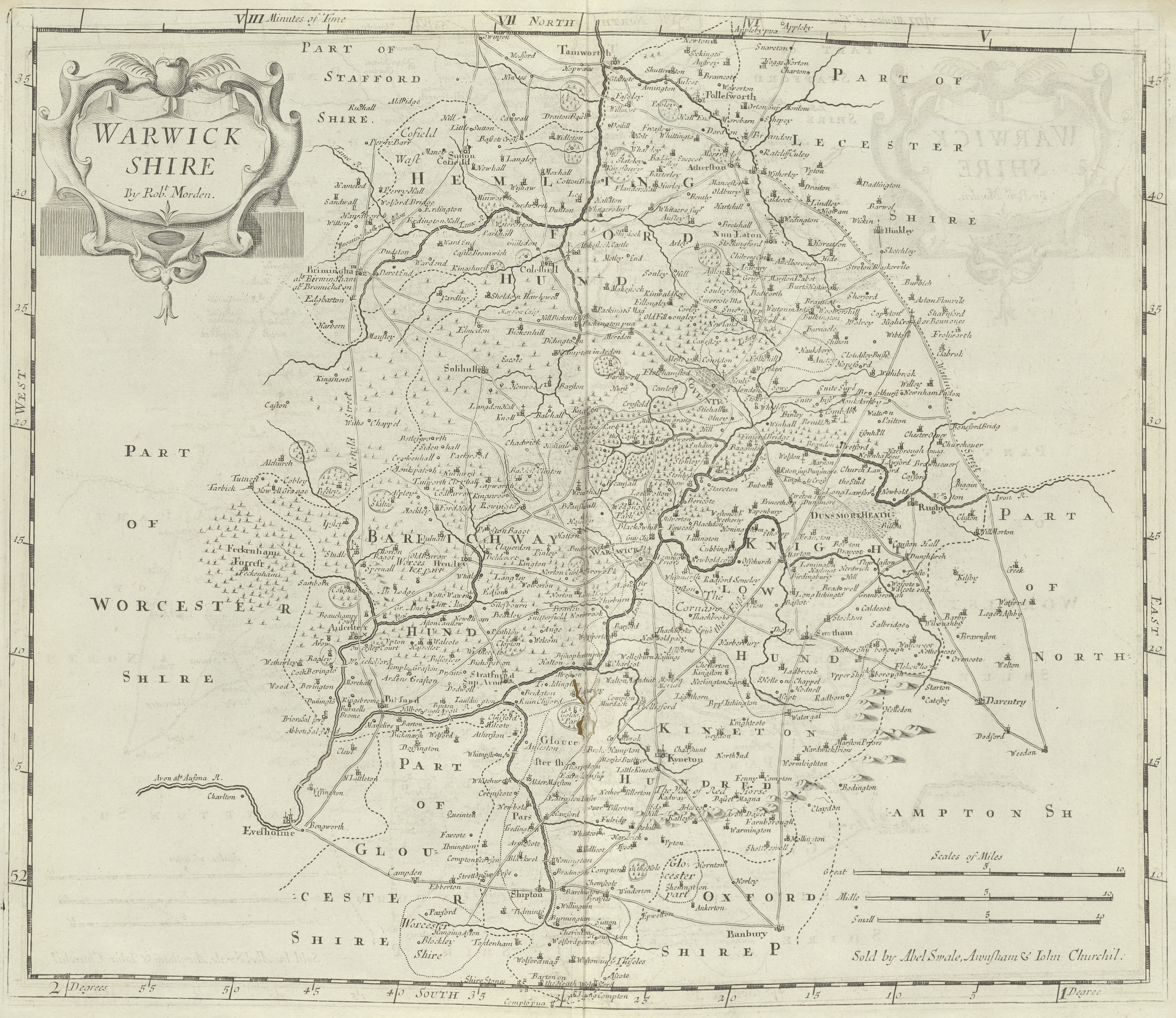
Warwickshire

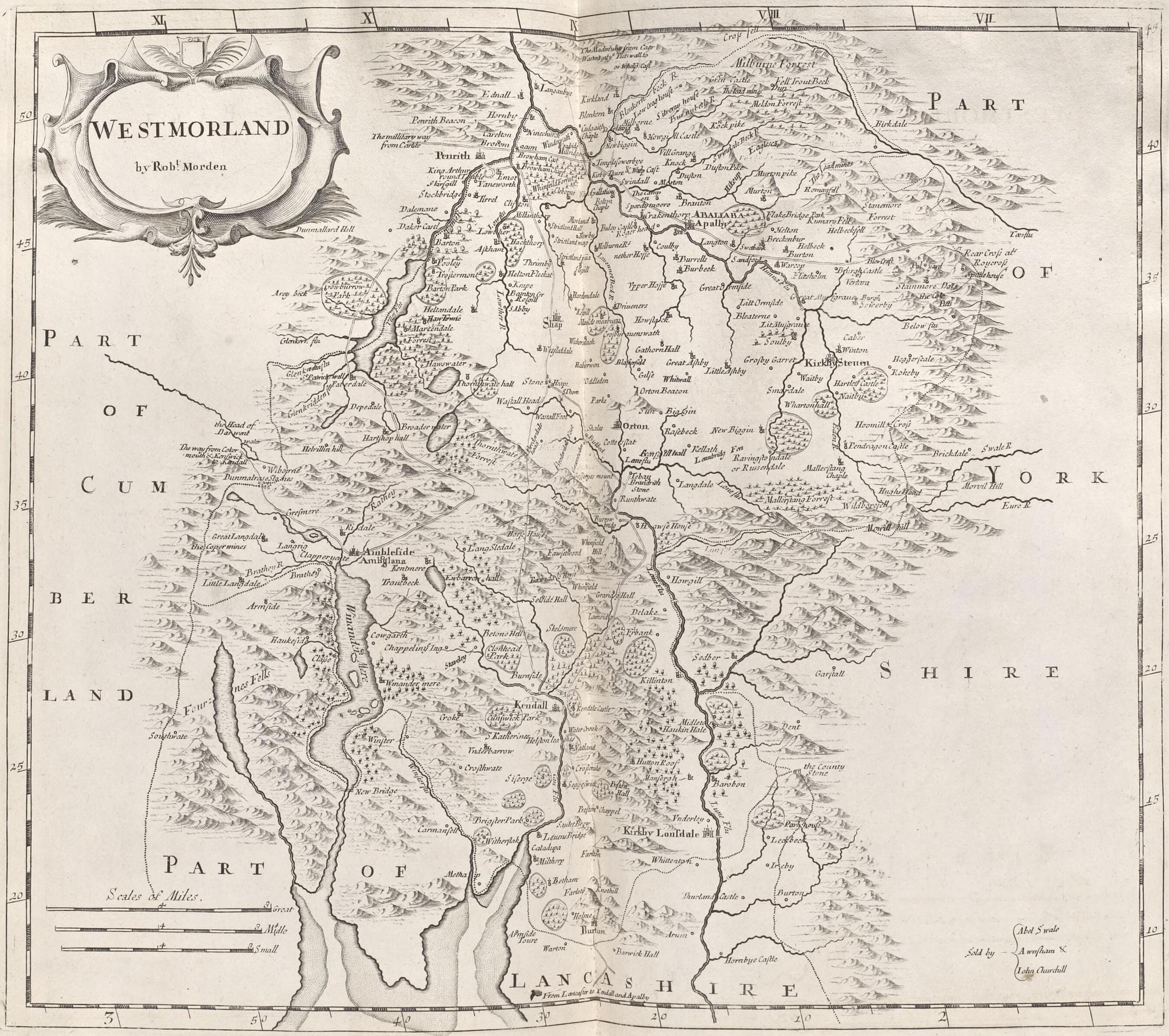
Westmorland

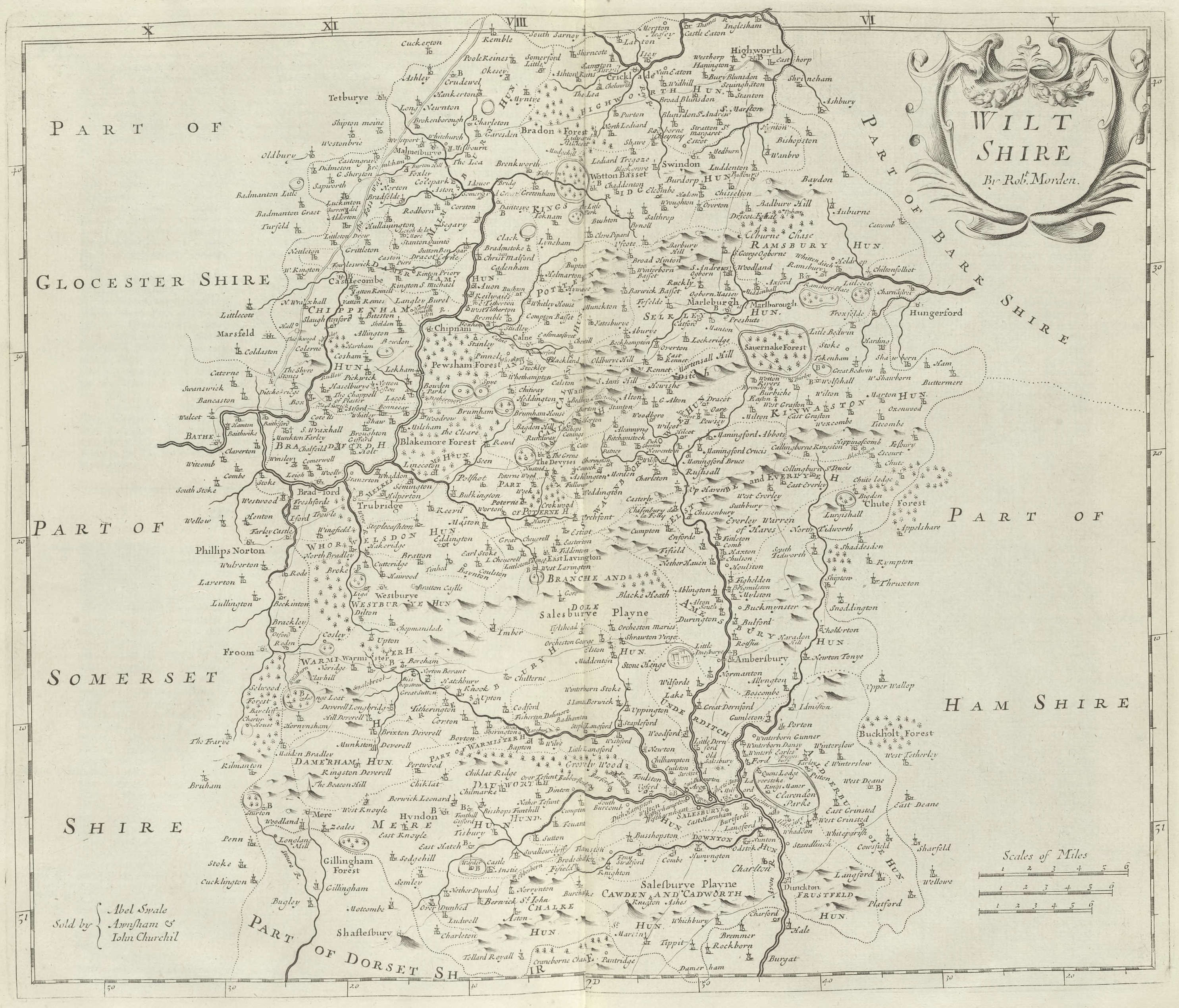
Wiltshire

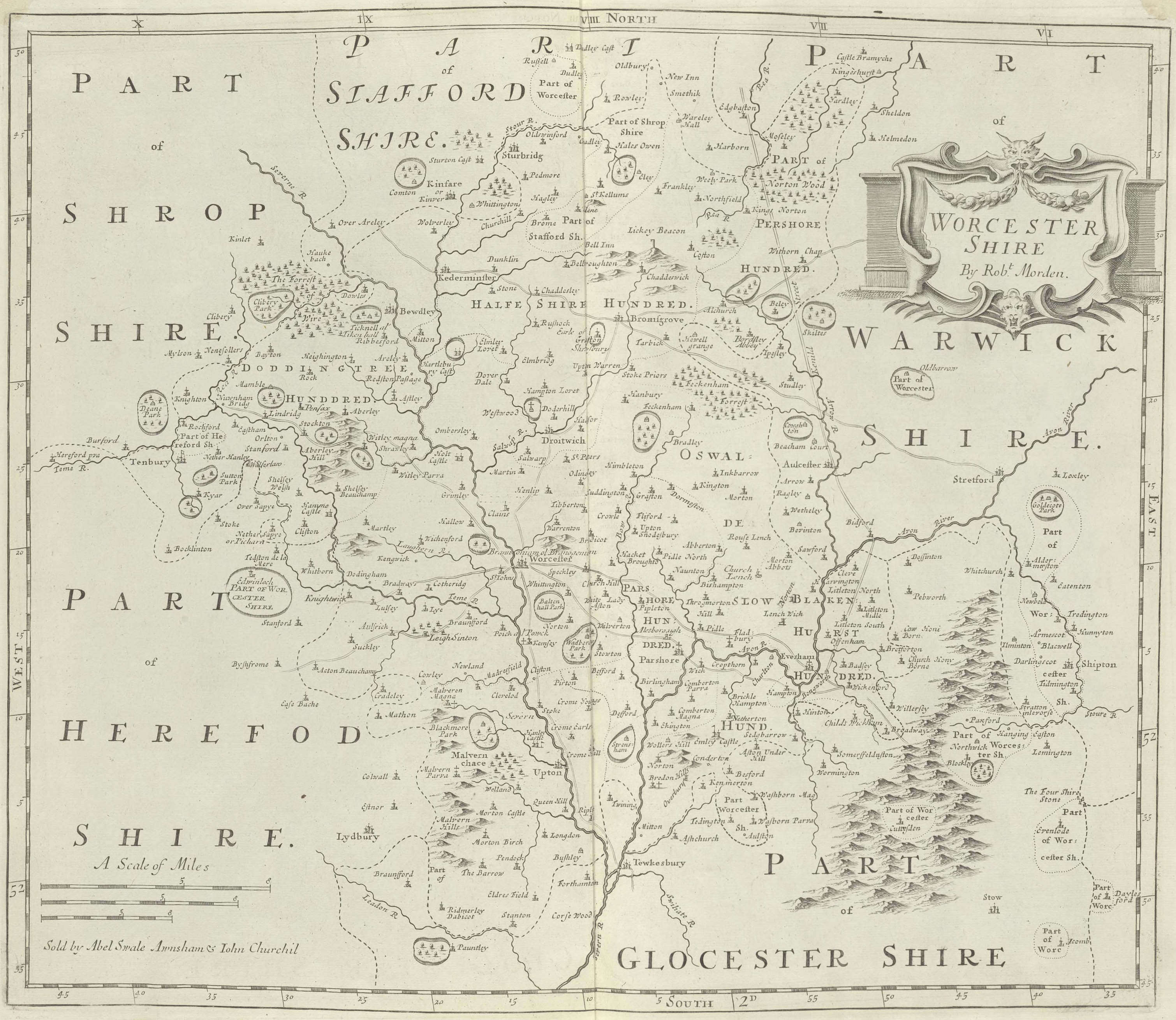
Worcestershire

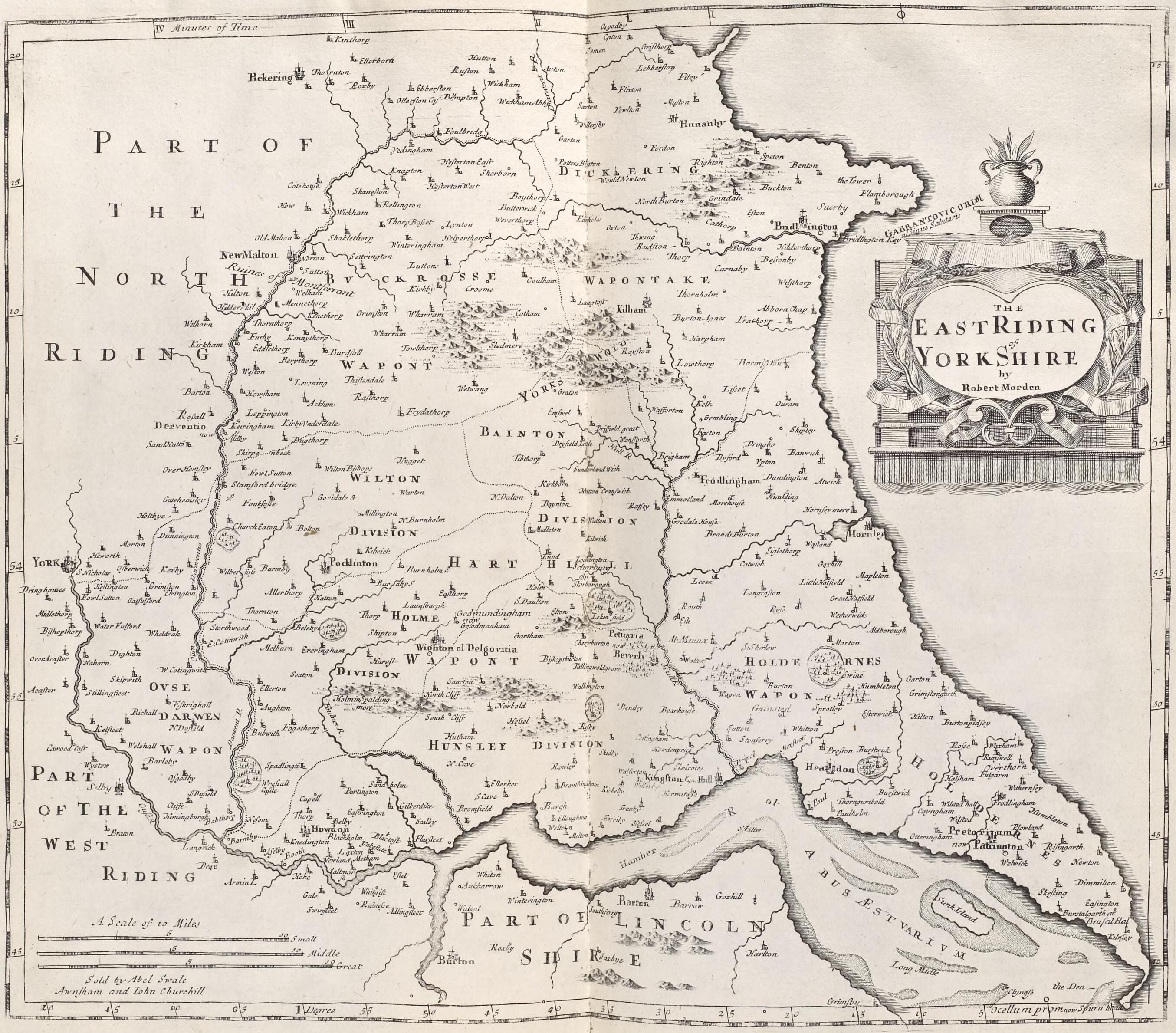
Yorkshire (East Riding)

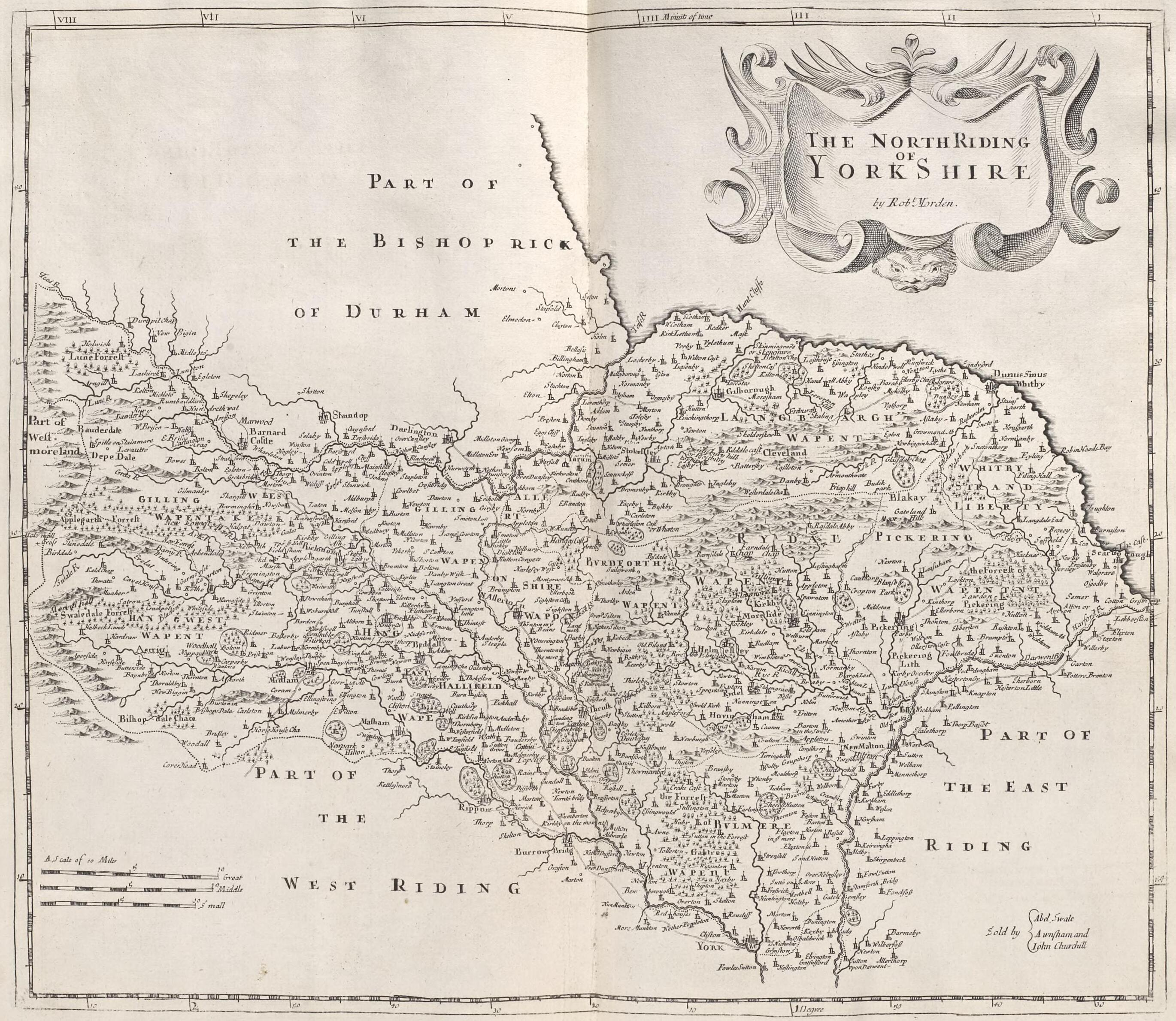
Yorkshire (North Riding)

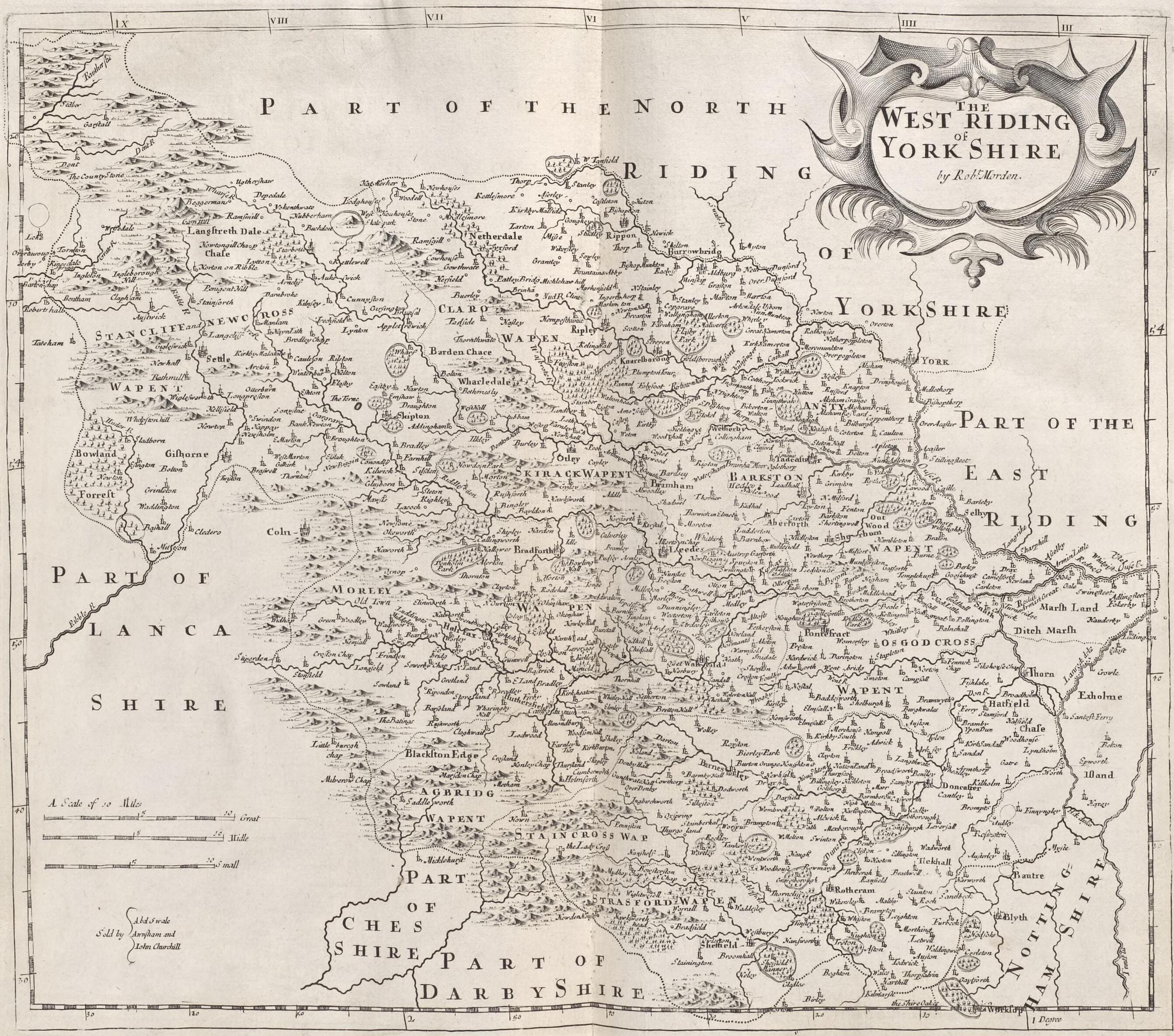
Yorkshire (West Riding)

== See also ==
- Britannia (atlas) (in addition to Camden, two further authors published atlases using this name)
  - Richard Blome (1635–1705)
  - John Ogilby (1600–1676)
