= Robert Hues =

English mathematician and geographer (1553–1632)

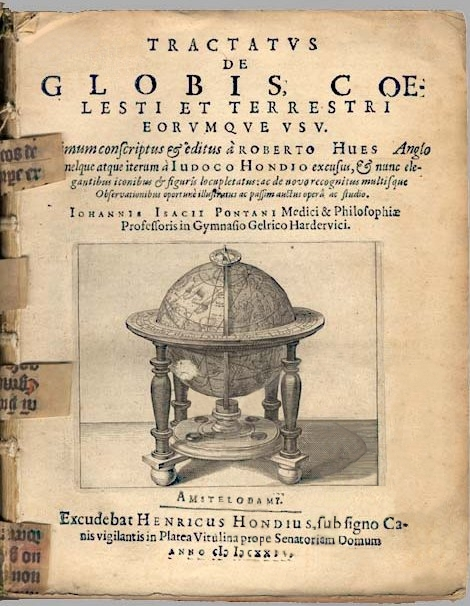
- The title page of a 1634 version of Hues's Tractatus de globis in the collection of the Biblioteca Nacional de Portugal
- Born: 1553; Little Hereford, Herefordshire, England
- Died: 24 May 1632 (aged 78–79); Oxford, Oxfordshire, England
- Education: St Mary Hall, Oxford (BA, 1578)
- Known for: publishing Tractatus de globis et eorum usu (Treatise on Globes and their Use, 1594)
- Scientific career
- Fields: Mathematics, geography

Robert Hues (1553 – 24 May 1632) was an English mathematician and geographer. He attended St. Mary Hall at Oxford, and graduated in 1578. Hues became interested in geography and mathematics, and studied navigation at a school set up by Walter Raleigh. During a trip to Newfoundland, he made observations which caused him to doubt the accepted published values for variations of the compass. Between 1586 and 1588, Hues travelled with Thomas Cavendish on a circumnavigation of the globe, performing astronomical observations and taking the latitudes of places they visited. Beginning in August 1591, Hues and Cavendish again set out on another circumnavigation of the globe. During the voyage, Hues made astronomical observations in the South Atlantic, and continued his observations of the variation of the compass at various latitudes and at the Equator. Cavendish died on the journey in 1592, and Hues returned to England the following year.

In 1594, Hues published his discoveries in the Latin work Tractatus de globis et eorum usu (Treatise on Globes and Their Use) which was written to explain the use of the terrestrial and celestial globes that had been made and published by Emery Molyneux in late 1592 or early 1593, and to encourage English sailors to use practical astronomical navigation. Hues's work subsequently went into at least 12 other printings in Dutch, English, French and Latin.

Hues continued to have dealings with Raleigh in the 1590s, and later became a servant of Thomas Grey, 15th Baron Grey de Wilton. While Grey was imprisoned in the Tower of London for participating in the Bye Plot, Hues stayed with him. Following Grey's death in 1614, Hues attended upon Henry Percy, the 9th Earl of Northumberland, when he was confined in the Tower; one source states that Hues, Thomas Harriot and Walter Warner were Northumberland's constant companions and known as his "Three Magi", although this is disputed. Hues tutored Northumberland's son Algernon Percy (who was to become the 10th Earl of Northumberland) at Oxford, and subsequently (in 1622–1623) Algernon's younger brother Henry. In later years, Hues lived in Oxford where he was a fellow of the university, and discussed mathematics and related subjects with like-minded friends. He died on 24 May 1632 in the city and was buried in Christ Church Cathedral.

== Early years and education ==
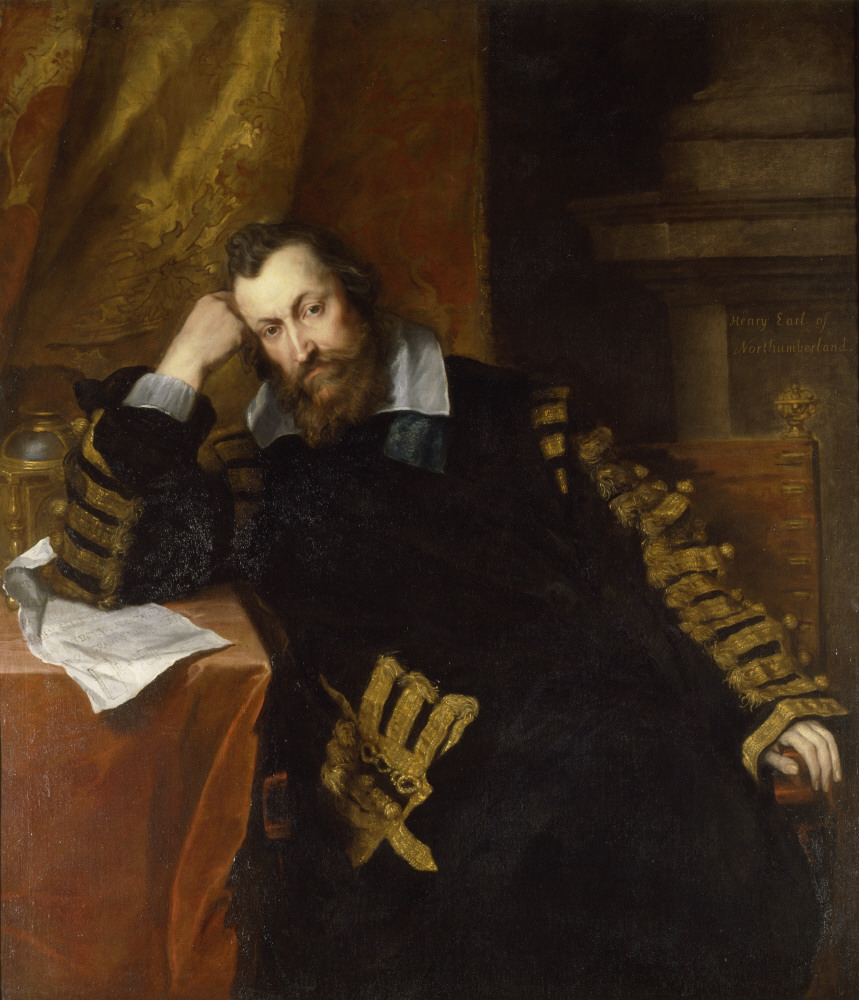
Van Dyck's portrait of Henry Percy, the 9th Earl of Northumberland, with whom Hues was associated

Robert Hues was born in 1553 at Little Hereford in Herefordshire, England. In 1571, at the age of 18 years, he entered Brasenose College, Oxford. English antiquarian Anthony à Wood wrote that when Hues arrived at Oxford he was "only a poor scholar or servitor ... he continued for some time a very sober and serious servant ... but being sensible of the loss of time which he sustained there by constant attendance, he transferred himself to St Mary's Hall". Hues graduated with a Bachelor of Arts (B.A.) degree on 12 July 1578, having shown marked skill in Greek. He later gave advice to the dramatist and poet George Chapman for his 1616 English translation of Homer, and Chapman referred to him as his "learned and valuable friend". According to the Oxford Dictionary of National Biography, there is unsubstantiated evidence that after completing his degree Hues was held in the Tower of London, though no reason is given for this, then went abroad after his release. It is possible he travelled to Continental Europe.

Hues was a friend of the geographer Richard Hakluyt, who was then regent master of Christ Church. In the 1580s, Hakluyt introduced him to Walter Raleigh and explorers and navigators whom Raleigh knew. In addition, it is likely that Hues came to know astronomer and mathematician Thomas Harriot and Walter Warner at Thomas Allen's lectures in mathematics. The four men were later associated with Henry Percy, the 9th Earl of Northumberland, who was known as the "Wizard Earl" for his interest in scientific and alchemical experiments and his library.

== Career ==
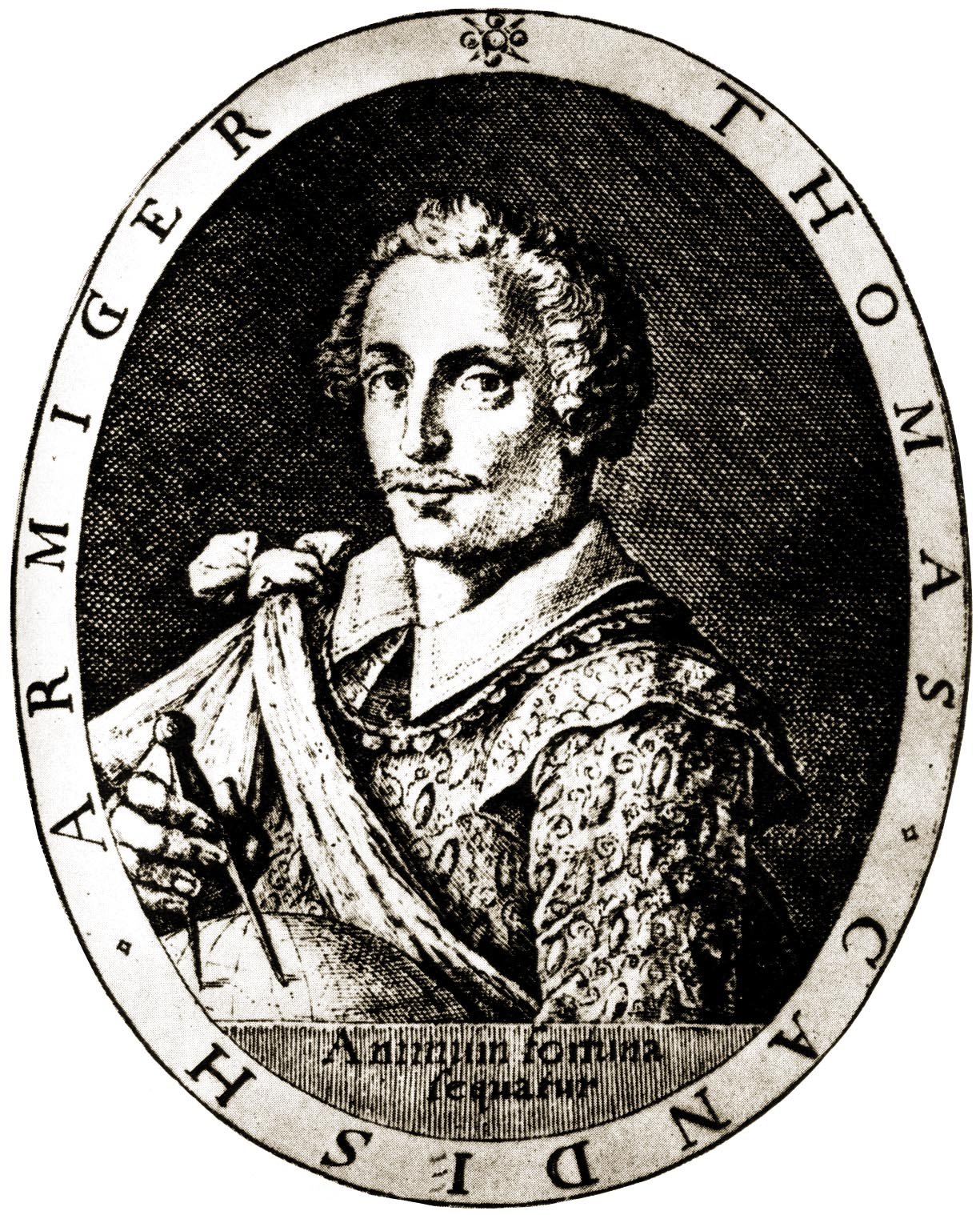
An engraving of Thomas Cavendish by Willem and Magdalena van de Passe from Holland's Herōologia Anglica (Praise of English Heroes, 1620), titled "Thomas Candish, Armiger. Animum fortuna sequatur [The soul follows chance]". Hues circumnavigated the globe with Cavendish between 1586 and 1588.

Hues became interested in geography and mathematics – an undated source indicates that he disputed accepted values of variations of the compass after making observations off the Newfoundland coast. He either went there on a fishing trip, or may have joined a 1585 voyage to Virginia arranged by Raleigh and led by Richard Grenville, which passed Newfoundland on the return journey to England. Hues perhaps become acquainted with the sailor Thomas Cavendish at this time, as both of them were taught by Harriot at Raleigh's school of navigation. An anonymous 17th-century manuscript states that Hues circumnavigated the world with Cavendish between 1586 and 1588 "purposely for taking the true Latitude of places"; he may have been the "NH" who wrote a brief account of the voyage that was published by Hakluyt in his 1589 work The Principall Navigations, Voiages, and Discoveries of the English Nation. In the year that book appeared, Hues was with Edward Wright on the Earl of Cumberland's raiding expedition to the Azores to capture Spanish galleons.

Beginning in August 1591, Hues joined Cavendish on another attempt to circumnavigate the globe. Sailing on the Leicester, they were accompanied by the explorer John Davis on the Desire. Cavendish and Davis agreed that they would part company once they had cleared the Strait of Magellan between Chile and Isla Grande de Tierra del Fuego, as Davis intended to sail to America to search for the Northwest Passage. The expedition was ultimately unsuccessful, although Davis did discover the Falkland Islands. In the meantime, delayed in small harbours in the Strait with crew members dying from the cold, illness and starvation, Cavendish turned back eastwards to return to England. He was plagued by mutinous crewmen, and also by natives and Portuguese who attacked his sailors seeking food and water on shore. Increasingly depressed, Cavendish died in 1592 somewhere in the Atlantic Ocean, possibly a suicide.

During the voyage, Hues made astronomical observations of the Southern Cross and other stars of the Southern Hemisphere while in the South Atlantic, and also observed the variation of the compass there and at the Equator. He returned to England after Cavendish died, and published his discoveries in the work Tractatus de globis et eorum usu (Treatise on Globes and Their Use, 1594), which he dedicated to Raleigh. The book was written to explain the use of the terrestrial and celestial globes that had been made and published by Emery Molyneux in late 1592 or early 1593. Apparently, the book was also intended to encourage English sailors to use practical astronomical navigation, although Lesley Cormack has observed that the fact it was written in Latin suggests that it was aimed at scholarly readers on the Continent. In 1595, William Sanderson, a London merchant who had largely financed the globes' construction, presented a small globe together with Hues's "Latin booke that teacheth the use of my great globes" to Robert Cecil, a statesman who was spymaster and minister to Elizabeth I and James I. Hues's work subsequently went into at least 12 other printings in Dutch (1597, 1613 and 1622), English (1638 and 1659), French (1618) and Latin (1611, 1613, 1617, 1627, 1659 and 1663). In his book An Accidence or The Path-way to Experience: Necessary for all Young Sea-men (1626), John Smith, who founded the first permanent English settlement in North America at Jamestown, Virginia, listed Hues's book among the works that a young seaman should study.

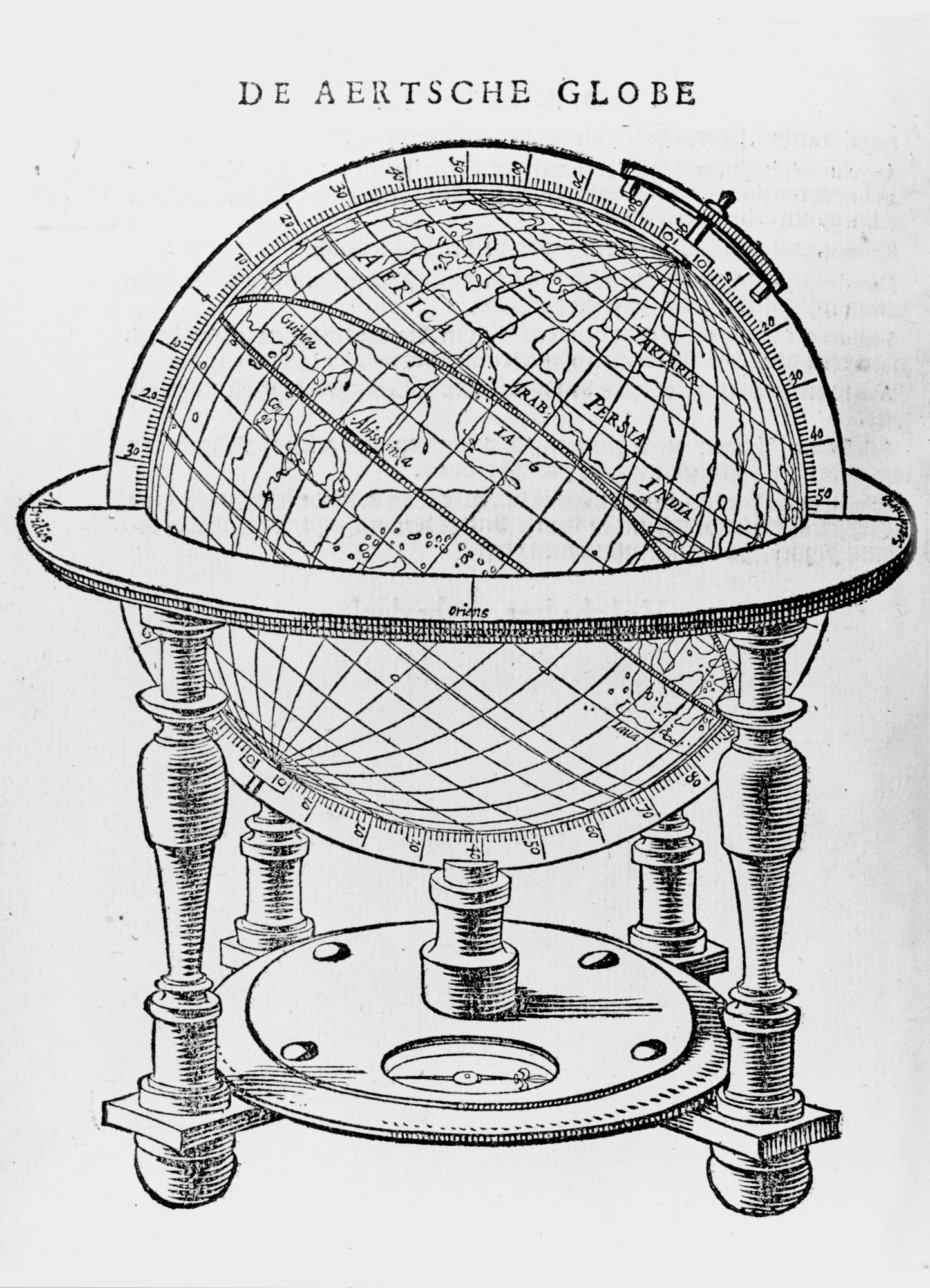
A drawing of Molyneux's terrestrial globe from Tractaet ofte Handelinge van het gebruyck der Hemelscher ende Aertscher Globe, the 1623 Dutch version of Hues's Tractatus de globis

Tractatus de globis begins with a letter by Hues dedicated to Raleigh that recalled geographical discoveries made by Englishmen during Elizabeth I's reign. However, he felt that his countrymen would have surpassed the Spaniards and Portuguese if they had a complete knowledge of astronomy and geometry, which were essential to successful navigation. In the preface of the book, Hues rehearsed arguments that proved the earth is a sphere, and refuted opposing theories. The treatise was divided into five parts. The first part described elements common to Molyneux's terrestrial and celestial globes, including the circles and lines inscribed on them, zones and climates, and the use of each globe's wooden horizon circle and brass meridian. The second part described planets, fixed stars and constellations; while the third part described the lands and seas shown on the terrestrial globe, and discussed the length of the circumference of the earth and of a degree of a great circle. Part 4, which Hues considered the most important part of the work, explained how the globes enabled seamen to determine the sun's position, latitude, course and distance, amplitudes and azimuths, and time and declination. The final part of the work contained a treatise inspired by Harriot on rhumb lines. In the work, Hues also published for the first time the six fundamental navigational propositions involved in solving what was later termed the "nautical triangle" used for plane sailing. Difference of latitude and departure (or longitude) are two sides of the triangle forming a right angle, the distance travelled is the hypotenuse, and the angle between difference of latitude and distance is the course. If any two elements are known, the other two can be determined by plotting or calculation using tables of sines, tangents and secants.

In the 1590s, Hues continued to have dealings with Raleigh – he was one of the executors of Raleigh's will – and he may have been the "Hewes" who dined with Northumberland regularly in 1591. He later became a servant of Thomas Grey, the 15th and last Baron Grey de Wilton (1575–1614). For participating in the Bye Plot, a conspiracy by Roman Catholic priest William Watson to kidnap James I and force him to repeal anti-Catholic legislation, Grey was attainted and forfeited his title in 1603. The following year, he was imprisoned in the Tower of London. Grey was given consent for Hues to stay in the Tower with him. Between 1605 and 1621, Northumberland was also confined in the Tower; he was suspected of involvement in the Gunpowder Plot of 1605 because his relative Thomas Percy was among the conspirators.

In 1616, following Grey's death, Hues began to be "attendant upon th'aforesaid Earle of Northumberland for matters of learning", and was paid a yearly sum of £40 to support his research until Northumberland's death in 1632. Wood stated that Harriot, Hues and Warner were Northumberland's "constant companions, and were usually called the Earl of Northumberland's Three Magi. They had a table at the Earl's charge, and the Earl himself did constantly converse with them, and with Sir Walter Raleigh, then in the Tower". Together with the scientist Nathanael Toporley and the mathematician Thomas Allen, the men kept abreast of developments in astronomy, mathematics, physiology and the physical sciences, and made important contributions in these areas. According to the letter writer John Chamberlain, Northumberland refused a pardon offered to him in 1617, preferring to remain with Harriot, Hues and Warner. However, the fact that these companions of Northumberland were his "Three Magi" studying with him in the Tower of London has been regarded as a romanticisation by the antiquarian John Aubrey and disputed for lack of evidence. Hues was tutor to Northumberland's sons: first Algernon Percy, who subsequently became the 10th Earl of Northumberland, at Oxford where he matriculated at Christ Church in 1617; and later Algernon's younger brother Henry in 1622–1623. Hues lived at Christ Church at this time, but may have occasionally attended upon Northumberland at Petworth House in Petworth, West Sussex, and at Syon House in London after the latter's release from the Tower in 1622. Hues sometimes met Walter Warner in London, and they are known to have discussed the reflection of bodies.

== Later life ==
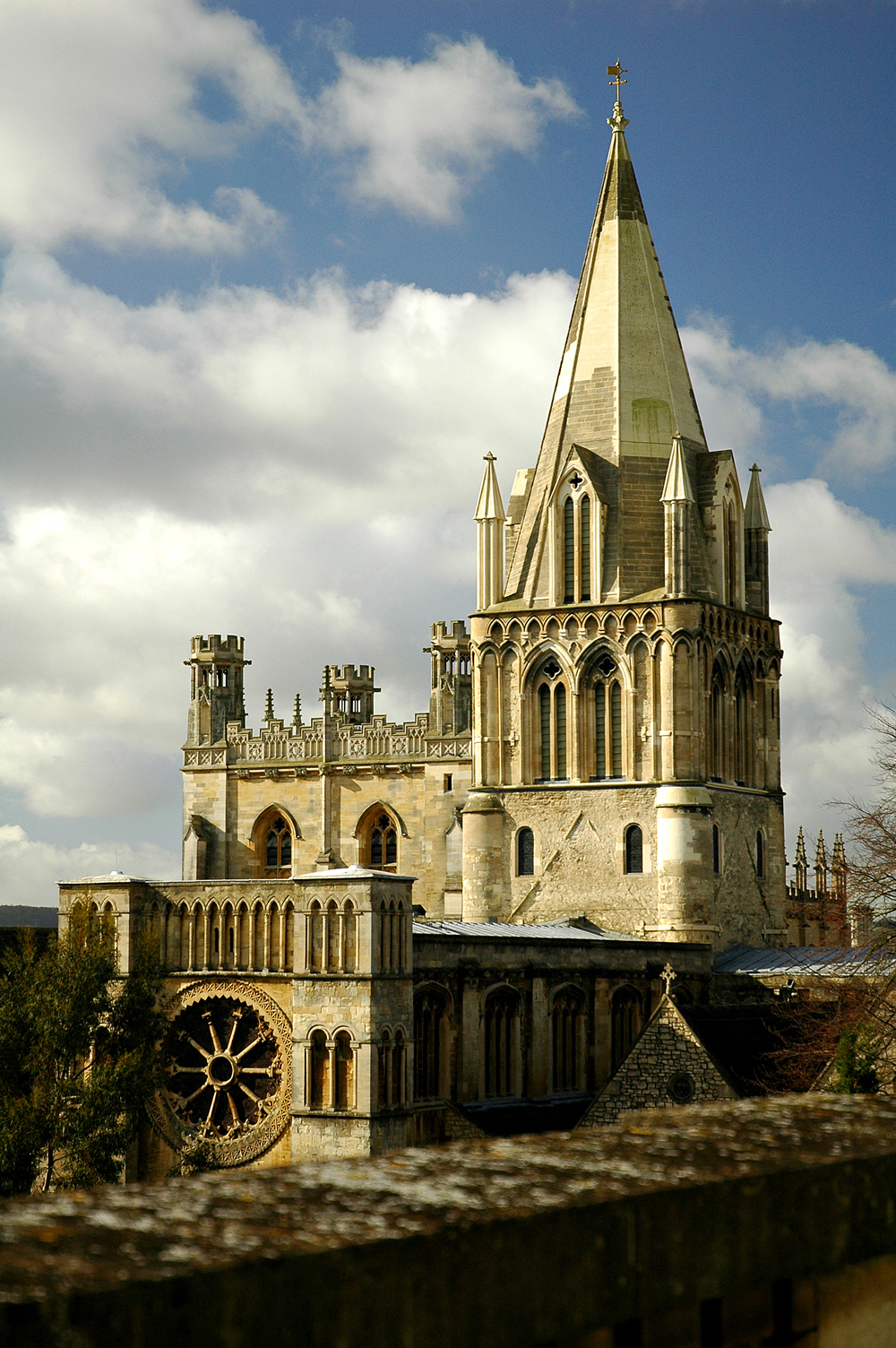
Christ Church Cathedral, Oxford, the burial place of Robert Hues

In later years, Hues lived in Oxford where he discussed mathematics and allied subjects with like-minded friends. Cormack states he was a fellow at the university. Under the terms of the will of Thomas Harriot, who died on 2 July 1621, Hues and Warner were given the responsibility of helping Harriot's executor Nathaniel Torporley to prepare Harriot's mathematical papers for publication. Hues was also required to help price Harriot's books and other possessions for sale to the Bodleian Library.

Hues, who did not marry, died on 24 May 1632 in Stone House, St. Aldate's (opposite the Blue Boar in central Oxford). This was the house of John Smith, M.A., the son of a cook at Christ Church named J. Smith. In his will, Hues made many small bequests to his friends, including a sum of £20 to his "kinswoman" Mary Holly (of whom nothing is known), and 20 nobles to each of her three sisters. He was buried in Christ Church Cathedral, and a monumental brass to him was placed in Christ Church with the following inscription:

Depositum viri literatissimi, morum ac religionis integerrimi, Roberti Husia, ob eruditionem omnigenem [sic: omnigenam?], Theologicam tum Historicam, tum Scholasticam, Philologicam, Philosophiam, præsertim vero Mathematicam (cujus insigne monumentum in typis reliquit) Primum Thomæ Candishio conjunctissimi, cujus in consortio, explorabundis [sic: explorabundus?] velis ambivit orbem: deinde Domino Baroni Gray; cui solator accessit in arca Londinensi. Quo defuncto, ad studia henrici Comitis Northumbriensis ibidem vocatus est, cujus filio instruendo cum aliquot annorum operam in hac Ecclesia dedisset et Academiae confinium locum valetudinariae senectuti commodum censuisset; in ædibus Johannis Smith, corpore exhaustus, sed animo vividus, expiravit die Maii 24, anno reparatae salutis 1632, aetatis suæ 79. [Here lies a highly lettered man, of the highest moral and religious integrity, Robert Hues, on account of his erudition in all subjects, both Theology and History, and Rhetoric, Philology, and Philosophy, but especially Mathematics (of which a notable volume [i.e., his book] remains in print). He was most closely associated with Thomas Cavendish, in whose company he explored the world by sail; then with Lord Baron Gray, for whom he came as consoler in the Tower of London. When Gray died, he was summoned to study in the same place with Henry Earl of Northumberland, to teach his son, and when he had worked for some years in this Church [i.e., Christ Church Cathedral], and had decided that the place next to the School [i.e., Christ Church, Oxford] was suitable for his health in his old age, he breathed his last at the house of John Smith, his body exhausted, but with a lively spirit, on 24 May, in the year of our salvation 1632, at the age of 79.]

== Works ==
- Hues, Robert (1594), Tractatus de globis et eorum usu: accommodatus iis qui Londini editi sunt anno 1593, sumptibus Gulielmi Sandersoni civis Londinensis, conscriptus à Roberto Hues [Treatise on Globes and their Use: Adapted to those which have been Published in London in the Year 1593, at the Expense of William Sanderson, a London Resident, Written by Robert Hues], London: In ædibus Thomæ Dawson [in the house of Thomas Dawson], OCLC 55576175 (in Latin), octavo. The following reprints are referred to by Clements Markham in his introduction to the Hakluyt Society's 1889 reprint of the English version of Tractatus de globis at pp. xxxviii–xl:
  - 2nd printing: Hues, Robert (1597), Tractaet Ofte Hendelinge van het gebruijck der Hemelscher ende Aertscher Globe. Gheaccommodeert naer die Bollen, die eerst ghesneden zijn in Enghelandt door Io. Hondium, Anno 1693 [sic: 1593] ende nu gants door den selven vernieut, met alle de nieuwe ontdeckinghen van Landen, tot den daghe van heden geschiet, ende daerenboven van voorgaende fauten verbetert. In't Latijn beschreven, door Robertum Hues, Mathematicum, nu in Nederduijtsch overgheset, ende met diveersche nieuwe verclaringhe ende figueren vermeerdert en verciert. Door I. Hondium [Treatise or Essays on the Use of the Celestial and Terrestrial Globes. Tailored for the Globes which were First Made in England by J. Hondius, in the Year 1693 [sic: 1593], and which have now been Completely Revised by Him, with All New Discoveries of Countries up to the Present Day, and furthermore with Previous Errors Corrected. Described in Latin by Robert Hues, Mathematician, and now Translated into Dutch, and Enhanced and Ornamented with Several New Explanations and Figures, by J. Hondius], translated by Hondium, Iudocum, Amsterdam: Cornelis Claesz, OCLC 42811612 (in Dutch), quarto.
  - 3rd printing: Hues, Robert (1611), Tractatus de globis coelesti et terrestri ac eorum usu, conscriptus a Roberto Hues, denuo auctior & emendatior editus [Treatise on Globes Celestial and Terrestrial and their Use, written by Robert Hues, Second Enlarged and Corrected Edition], Amsterdam: Jodocus Hondius, OCLC 187141964 (in Latin), octavo. A reprint of the first edition of 1594.
  - 4th printing: Hues, Robert (1613), Tractaut of te handebingen van het gebruych der hemelsike ende aertscher globe [Treatise or Essays on the Use of the Celestial and Terrestrial Globes], Amsterdam: [s.n.] (in Dutch), quarto.
  - 5th printing: Hues, Robert (1613), Tractatvs de globis, coelesti et terrestri, ac eorvm vsu [Treatise on Globes, Celestial and Terrestrial, and their Use], Heidelberg: Typis [Printed by] Gotthardi Voegelini, OCLC 46414822 (in Latin). Contains the Index Geographicus. DeGolyer Collection in the History of Science and Technology (now History of Science Collections), University of Oklahoma.
  - 6th printing: Hues, Robert (1617), Tractatvs de globis, coelesti et terrestri eorvmqve vsv. Primum conscriptus & editus a Roberto Hues. Anglo semelque atque iterum a Iudoco Hondio excusus, & nunc elegantibus iconibus & figuris locupletatus: ac de novo recognitus multisque observationibus oportunè illustratus as passim auctus opera ac studio Iohannis Isacii Pontani ... [Treatise on Globes, Celestial and Terrestrial, and their Use. First Written and Published by Robert Hues, Englishman, and in the First and Second Editions Drawn by Jodocus Hondius, and now Enlarged by Elegant Pictures and Drawings, and again Revised and Fittingly Illustrated by Many Observations, and throughout Enlarged by the Work and Effort of John Isaac Pontanus ...], Amsterdam: Excudebat [printed by] H[enricus] Hondius (in Latin), quarto.
  - 7th printing: Hues, Robert (1618), Traicté des globes, et de leur usage, traduit du Latin de Robert Hues, et augmente de plusieurs nottes et operations du compas de proportion par D Henrion, mathematicien [A Treatise on Globes and their Use, Translated from the Latin version by Robert Hues, and Augmented with Several Notes and Operations of the Compass of Proportion by D Henrion, Mathematician], translated by Henrion, Denis, Paris: Chez Abraham Pacard, ruë sainct Iacques, au sacrifice d'Abraham [At Abraham Pacard, St. Jacques Street, with the sacrifice of Abraham], OCLC 37802904 (in French), octavo.
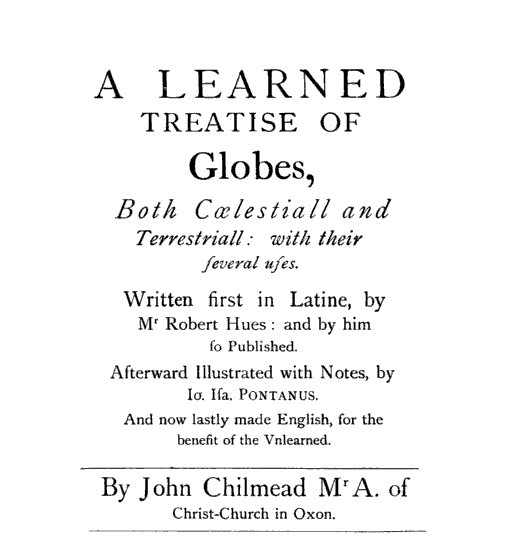
  - The title page of the first English edition of Robert Hues's A Learned Treatise of Globes, both Cœlestiall and Terrestriall: With their Severall Uses (1638), reproduced in the Hakluyt Society's 1889 reprint
    8th printing: Hues, Robert (1622), Tractaet ofte handelinge van het gebruyck der hemelscher ende aertscher globe [Treatise or Essays on the Use of the Celestial and Terrestrial Globes], Amsterdam: Michiel Colijn, boeck-vercooper, woonende op't water, in't Huys-boeck, by de Oude Brugghe [Michiel Colijn, bookseller, who lives at the water's edge, in Huys-boeck, near the old bridge], OCLC 79659147 (in Dutch), quarto.
  - 9th printing: Hues, Robert (1627), Tractatvs de globis, coelesti et terrestri, ac eorvm vsv [Treatise on Globes, Celestial and Terrestrial, and their Use], Francofvrti ad Moenvm [Frankfurt am Main, Germany]: Typis & sumptibus VVechelianorum, apud Danielem & Dauidem Aubrios & Clementem Schleichium [Printed and paid for by the Wechelians, by Daniel and David Aubrios and Clement Schleich], OCLC 23625532 (in Latin), duodecimo.
  - 10th printing: Hues, Robert (1638), A Learned Treatise of Globes, both Cœlestiall and Terrestriall: With their Severall Uses. Written first in Latine, by Mr Robert Hues: And by him so Published. Afterward Illustrated with Notes, by Io. Isa. Pontanus. And now Lastly made English, for the Benefit of the Unlearned by John Chilmead M^{r}A of Christ-Church in Oxon, London: Printed by the assigne of T[homas] P[urfoot] for P[hilemon] Stephens and C[hristopher] Meredith, and are to be sold at their shop at the Golden Lion in Pauls-Church-yard, OCLC 165905181.
  - 11th printing: A Latin version by Jodocus Hondius and John Isaac Pontanus appeared in London in 1659. Octavo.
  - 12th printing: Hues, Robert; John Isaac Pontanus (1659), A Learned Treatise of Globes, both Cœlestiall and Terrestriall with their Several Uses .., London: Printed by J.S. for Andrew Kemb, and are to be sold at his shop ..., OCLC 11947725, octavo. Collection of Yale University Library.
  - 13th printing: Hues, Robert (1663), Tractatus de globis coelesti et terrestri eorumque usu ac de novo recognitus multisq[ue] observationibus opportunè illustratus ac passim auctus, opera et studio Johannis Isacii Pontani ...; adjicitur Breviarium totius orbis terrarum Petri Bertii ... [Treatise on Globes Celestial and Terrestrial and their Use, Collected Anew and Suitably Illustrated with Many Observations and Enlarged Throughout, by the Effort and Devotion of John Isaac Pontanus ... A Brief Account of the Whole Globe is Added by Peter Bertius ...], Oxford: Excudebat [printed by] W.H., impensis [at the expense of] Ed. Forrest, OCLC 13197923 (in Latin).

The Hakluyt Society's reprint of the English version was itself published as:
- Hues, Robert (1889), Markham, Clements R. (ed.), Tractatus de globis et eorum usu: A Treatise Descriptive of the Globes Constructed by Emery Molyneux and Published in 1592 [Hakluyt Society, 1st ser., pt. II, no. 79a], London: Hakluyt Society.

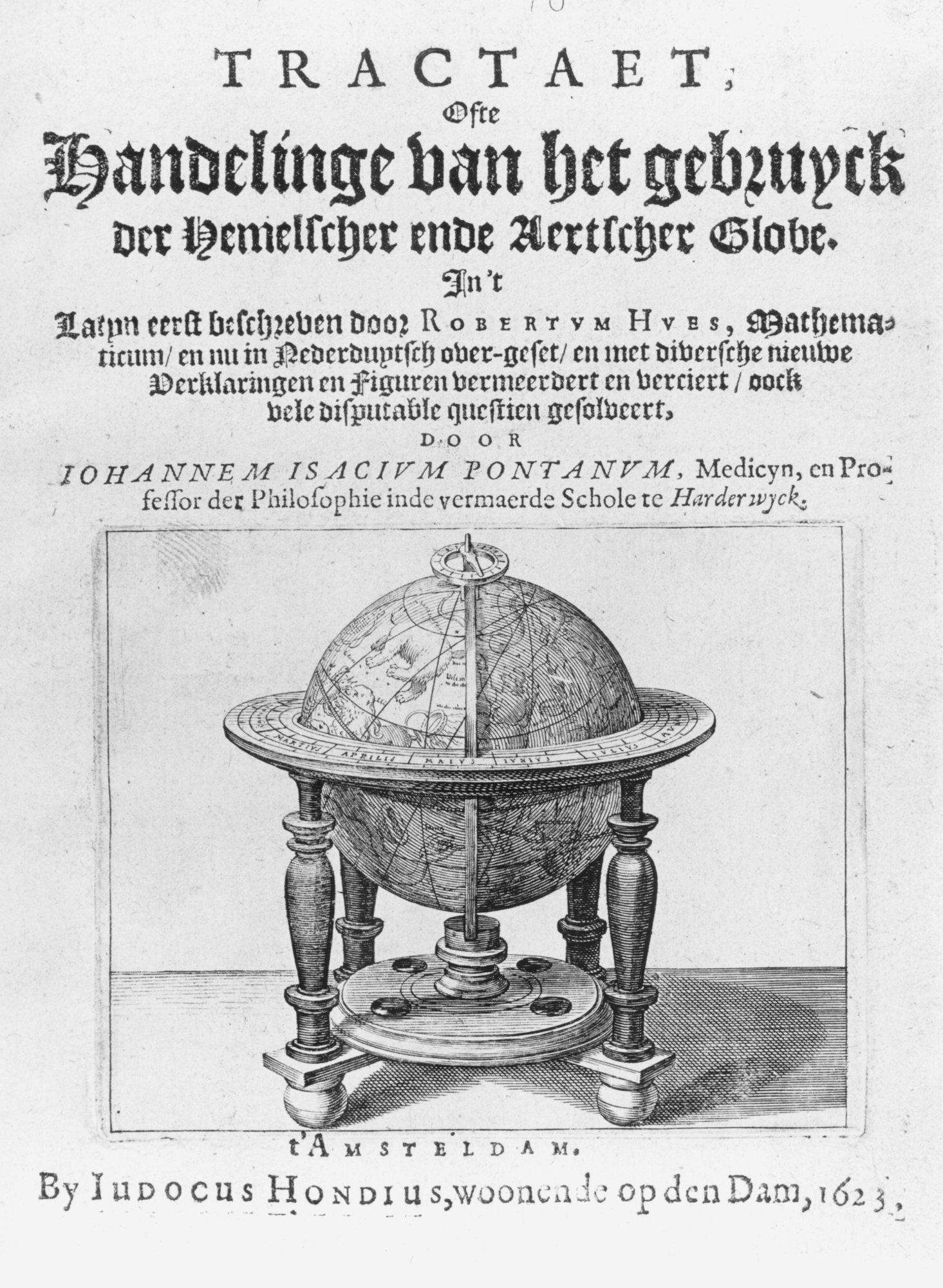
The title page of a 1623 Dutch version of Hues's Tractatus de globis

The following works also are, or appear to be, versions of Tractatus de globis et eorum usu, though they are not mentioned by Markham:

- Hues, Robert (1623), Tractaet ofte Handelinge van het gebruyck der Hemelscher ende Aertscher Globe: In't Latyn eerst beschreven door Robertvm Hves, Mathematicum / en nu in Nederduytsch over-geset en met diversche nieuwe Verklaringen en Figuren vermeerdert en verciert / oock vele disputable questien gesolveert, door Iohannem Isacivm Pontanvm, Medicyn, en Professor der Philosophie inde vermaerde Schole te Harderwyck [Treatise or Essays on the Use of the Heavenly and Earthly Globe: First Described in Latin by Robert Hues, Mathematician / and now Translated into Dutch, and Expanded and Decorated with New Clarifications and Figures / also many Disputable Questions Solved, by John Isaac Pontanus, Physician and Professor of Philosophy of the renowned School in Harderwijk], Amsterdam: Iudocus Hondius, woonende op den Dam [living on the Dam ], OCLC 51084257.
- Hues, Robert (1624), Tractatvs de globis, coelesti et terrestri eorvmqve vsv [Treatise on Globes, Celestial and Terrestrial, and their Use], Amsterdam: Excudebat [Printed by] H[enricus] Hondius, OCLC 8909075 (in Latin).
- Hues, Robert (1627), Tractatus duo mathematici: Quorum primus de globis coelesti et terrestri, eorum usu [Two Mathematical Treatises: Of which the First One is about the Celestial and Terrestial Globes, and their Use], Frankfurt: Bryana, OCLC 179907636.
- Hues, Robert; Nottnagel, Christoph (1627), Tractatus duo quorum primus de globis coelesti et terrestri, eorum usu, à Roberto Hues, Anglo, conscriptus. Alter breviarium totius orbis Terrarum, Petri Bertii. Nunc primum luci commißi [Two Treatises of which the First One is about the Celestial and Terrestrial Globes, and their Use, signed by Robert Hues, Englishman. The Other One is an Anthology of Countries of the Whole World, by Peter Bertius. Now for the first time here gathered.] (3rd ed.), Wittenberg: [s.n.], OCLC 257661113.
- Hues, Robert (1634), Tractatvs de Globis Coelesti et Terrestri eorvmqve vsv: Primum conscriptus & editus à Roberto Hues Anglo semelque atque iteram à Iudoco Hondio excusus, & nunc elegantibus iconibus & figuris locupletatus: ac de novo recognitus multisque observationibus oportunè illustratus ac passim auctus opera ac studio. Iohannis Isacii Pontani Medici & Philosophiæ Professoris in Gymnasio Gelrico Hardervici [Treatise on Globes, Celestial and Terrestrial, and their Use. First Written and Published by Robert Hues, Englishman, and in the First and Second Editions Drawn by Jodocus Hondius, and now Enlarged by Elegant Pictures and Drawings, and again Revised and Fittingly Illustrated by Many Observations, and throughout Enlarged by the Work and Effort of John Isaac Pontanus, Physician and Professor of Philosophy of the School in Harderwijk], Amsterdam: Excudebat Henricus Hondius, sub signo Canis Vigilantis in Platea Vitulina prope Senatorium [Printed by Henricus Hondius, under the sign of the Watchful Dog in Calf Street [Kalverstraat] near the council hall]. Collection of the Biblioteca Nacional de Portugal.
- Hues, Robert (1651), Tractatus duo mathematici. Quorum primus de globis coelesti et terrestri, eorum usu, a Roberto Hues ... conscriptus. Alter breviarium totius orbis terrarum, Petri Bertii ... Editio prioribus auctior & emendatior [Two Mathematical Treatises. Of which the First One is about the Celestial and Terrestial Globes, and their Use, signed ... Robert Hues. The Other One an Anthology of Countries of the Whole World, of Peter Bertius ... First enlarged & improved edition], Oxford: Excudebat [Printed by] L. Lichfield, impensis [at the expense of] Ed. Forrest, OCLC 14913709, two pts. Collection of the Bodleian Library.
