= Emery Molyneux =

English globemaker (died 1598)

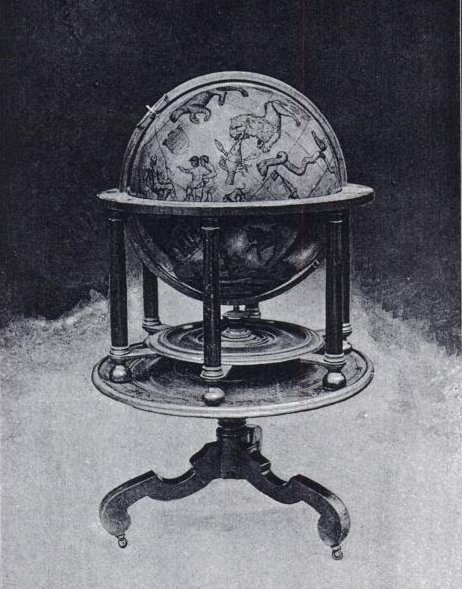
- One of Molyneux's celestial globes, which is displayed in Middle Temple Library – from the frontispiece of the Hakluyt Society's 1889 reprint of A Learned Treatise of Globes, both Cœlestiall and Terrestriall, one of the English editions of Robert Hues' Latin work Tractatus de Globis (1594)
- Born: Emery Molyneux
- Died: June 1598; Amsterdam, Holland, Dutch Republic
- Other names: Emerius Mulleneux (Latin), Emmerie Molineux
- Occupations: Maker of globes, mathematical instruments and ordnance
- Known for: Making the first globes in England
- Spouse: Anne

Emery Molyneux (/ˈɛməri ˈmɒlɪnoʊ/ EM-ər-ee MOL-in-oh; died June 1598) was an English Elizabethan maker of globes, mathematical instruments and ordnance. His terrestrial and celestial globes, first published in 1592, were the first to be made in England and the first to be made by an Englishman.

Molyneux was known as a mathematician and maker of mathematical instruments such as compasses and hourglasses. He became acquainted with many prominent men of the day, including the writer Richard Hakluyt and the mathematicians Robert Hues and Edward Wright. He also knew the explorers Thomas Cavendish, Francis Drake, Walter Raleigh and John Davis. Davis probably introduced Molyneux to his own patron, the London merchant William Sanderson, who largely financed the construction of the globes. When completed, the globes were presented to Elizabeth I. Larger globes were acquired by royalty, noblemen and academic institutions, while smaller ones were purchased as practical navigation aids for sailors and students. The globes were the first to be made in such a way that they were unaffected by the humidity at sea, and they came into general use on ships.

Molyneux emigrated to Amsterdam with his wife in 1596 or 1597. He succeeded in interesting the States-General, the parliament of the United Provinces, in a cannon he had invented, but he died suddenly in June 1598, apparently in poverty. The globe-making industry in England died with him.

Only six of his globes are believed still to be in existence. Three are in England, of which one pair consisting of a terrestrial and a celestial globe is owned by Middle Temple and displayed in its library, while a terrestrial globe is at Petworth House in Petworth, West Sussex.

== Globe-maker ==
=== Construction ===
Emery Molyneux is regarded as the maker of the first terrestrial and celestial globes in England and as the first English globe-maker. Little is known about the man himself. Petruccio Ubaldini, an Italian calligraphist, illuminator and ambassador who was acquainted with him, said he was "of obscure and humble family background". It seems likely that he was the "Emery Molynox" who was presented to the Worshipful Company of Stationers as the apprentice of one William Cooke in October 1557. By the 1580s he had a workshop in Lambeth, on the south bank of the Thames, and enjoyed a reputation as a mathematician and maker of mathematical instruments. Richard Polter, in his book The Pathway to Perfect Sayling (1605), mentioned that Molyneux had been a skilful maker of compasses and hourglasses.

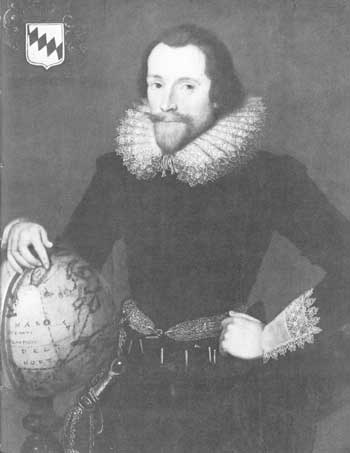
A portrait of Sir Walter Raleigh with a globe, attributed to Federico Zuccari (1542/1543–1609)

Through his trade, Molyneux was known to the explorers Thomas Cavendish, John Davis, Francis Drake and Walter Raleigh, the writer Richard Hakluyt, and the mathematicians Robert Hues and Edward Wright. The construction of globes by Molyneux appears to have been suggested by Davis to his patron William Sanderson, a London merchant who has been described as "one of the most munificent and patriotic of merchant-princes of London in the days of Elizabeth I". Sanderson readily agreed to bear the manufacturing costs, and financed initial production of the globes with a capital investment of £1,000 (almost £160,000 as of 2007).

==== Terrestrial globes ====
In making his terrestrial globes, Molyneux examined ruttiers (instructions for directions at sea) and pilots (navigational handbooks). He is known to have given a ruttier for Brazil and the West Indies to Thomas Harriot in 1590. He also received advice and assistance from navigators and mathematicians. It is likely, for instance, that Sir Walter Raleigh advised him on a legend in Spanish about the Solomon Islands that appeared on the terrestrial globe. Raleigh came by the information from Pedro Sarmiento de Gamboa, a Galician explorer sent by King Philip II of Spain to fortify the Strait of Magellan after Francis Drake had passed through it. In 1584, the Spaniard was Raleigh's guest in London for a few weeks, after being captured by Raleigh on a journey to Europe.

Molyneux accompanied Francis Drake on his 1577–1580 circumnavigation of the world; as Ubaldini reported, "[h]e himself has been in those seas and on those coasts in the service of the same Drake". A legend in Latin on the terrestrial globe, explaining why Molyneux had left out the polar lands and corrected the distance across the Atlantic Ocean between The Lizard and Cape Race in Newfoundland, concluded:

Quod equide[m] effeci tu[m] ex meis navigationibus primo, tum deinceps ex felici illa sub clariss. Fran. Drako ad Indos Occident, expeditione, in qua non-modo optimas quasqu[e] alioru[m] descriptiones, sed quidquid mea quantulacu[m]que, vel scie[n]ta vel experientia ad integru[m] hoc qui[n]quen[n]io pr[a]estare potuit, ad hujus operis perfectione[m] co[m]paravi ... [I have been able to do this both in the first place from my own voyages and secondly from that successful expedition to the West Indies under the most illustrious Francis Drake: in which expedition I have put together not only all the best delineations of others, but everything my own humble knowledge or experience has been able to furnish in the last five years to the perfecting of this work.]

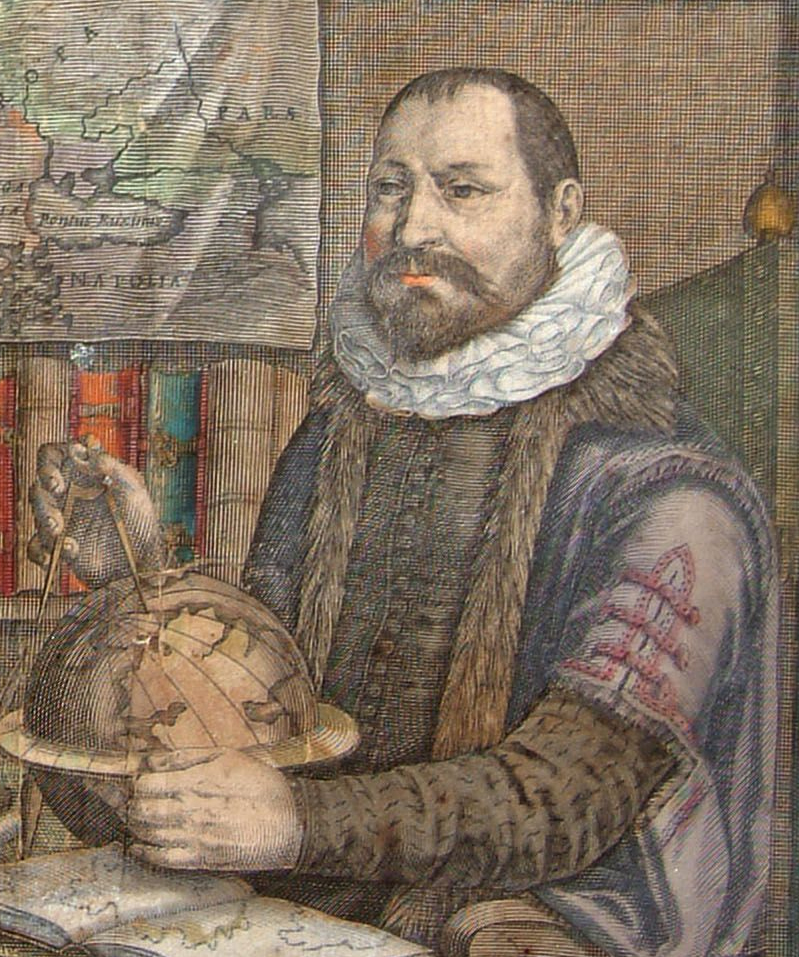
Jodocus Hondius (1563–1612), the Flemish engraver and cartographer who printed the gores of Molyneux's globes – from Atlas or a Geographicke Description of the World (1636)

On the terrestrial globe, tracks of the voyages of Francis Drake and Thomas Cavendish around the world are marked by red and blue lines respectively. These lines were applied when the globe was first made. They are mentioned in a description of Molyneux's globes in Blundeville His Exercises (1594) by Thomas Blundeville, a country gentleman who was an enthusiastic student of astronomy and navigation. Thomas Cavendish appears to have helped Molyneux with his globes, and it is possible that Molyneux accompanied him on his 1587 voyage around the world, which returned to England on 9 September 1588. In 1889, Sir Clements Markham, an English explorer, author and geographer, pointed out that a Latin legend on the terrestrial globe, placed off the Patagonian coast, states: "Thomas Caundish 18 Dec. 1587 hæc terra sub nostris oculis primum obtulit sub latitud 47 cujus seu admodum salubris Incolæ maturi ex parte proceri sunt gigantes et vasti magnitudinis". However, Helen Wallis, former Map Curator of the British Library, observed in 1951 that this was unlikely, because Molyneux incorrectly plotted Cavendish's course in Maritime Southeast Asia. She suggested, however, that another legend on the globe may indicate that he sailed on at least one if not all of John Davis's voyages.

The mathematician and cartographer Edward Wright assisted Molyneux in plotting coastlines on the terrestrial globe and translated some of the legends into Latin. On 10 April 1591, the astrologer and physician Simon Forman visited Molyneux's workshop and taught him how to find longitude. It appears that after Molyneux had prepared the manuscript gores (the flat map segments attached to the globes), he had them printed by the celebrated Flemish engraver and cartographer Jodocus Hondius, who lived in London between 1584 and 1593 to escape religious difficulties in Flanders. This can be deduced from the phrase "Iodocus Hon: / dius Flan. sc. / 1592" that appears on the celestial globe along with Sanderson's coat of arms and a dedication to the Queen dated 1592. Molyneux's own name is recorded on the Middle Temple terrestrial globe in the phrase "Emerius Mulleneux Angl.' / sumptibus Gulielmi— / Sandersoni Londinē: / sis descripsit" ("Emery Molyneux of England, at the expense of William Sanderson of London, described this").

==== Celestial globes ====
Molyneux's celestial globe was virtually a copy of Gerardus Mercator's globe of 1551, which itself was based on a globe of 1537 by Gemma Frisius that Mercator had helped to construct. To the constellations featured on Mercator's globe, Molyneux added the Southern Cross and Southern Triangle, though somewhat to the west of their true positions. His source appears to have been Andrea Corsali's diagram of the Antarctic sky published in 1550.

Molyneux's globes were the first to be constructed in such a way that they were unaffected by humidity at sea. They were made of flour-paste, an unusual material for the time. Simon Forman remarked that Molyneux's moulding or casting process was "the only way to caste [anything] whatsoever in perfecte forme ... and yt is the perfectest and trewest waie of all wayes ... and this was the wai that Mullenax did use to cast flowere [flour] in the verie forme".

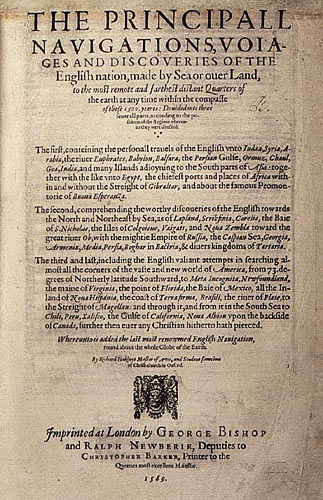
The title page of Richard Hakluyt's 1589 work The Principall Navigations, Voiages and Discoveries of the English Nation, which announced the coming publication of Molyneux's terrestrial globe

=== Publication ===
In 1589, Richard Hakluyt announced the forthcoming publication of Molyneux's terrestrial globe at the end of the preface to The Principall Navigations, Voiages and Discoveries of the English Nation. Referring to the map that was inserted into the volume—a reproduction of the "Typus Orbis Terrarum" engraved by Franciscus Hogenberg for Abraham Ortelius' Theatrum Orbis Terrarum (1570)—he wrote:

I have contented myselfe with inserting into the worke one of the best generall mappes of the world onely, untill the comming out of a very large and most exact terrestriall globe, collected and reformed according to the newest, secretest, and latest discoveries, both Spanish, Portugall and English, composed by Mr. Emmerie Molineux of Lambeth, a rare Gentleman in his profession, being therin for divers yeeres, greatly supported by the purse and liberalitie of the worshipfull merchant M. William Sanderson.

Ubaldini reported Molyneux's progress in manufacturing the globes to the governor of Milan. He was in attendance when Molyneux presented a pair of manuscript globes to Elizabeth I at Greenwich in July 1591. Ubaldini noted that "he gave her the globe to let her see at a glance how much of the world she could control by means of her naval forces". According to Wallis, the printed globes, which at 2 feet 1 inch (0.64 m) in diameter were then the largest ever made, were published after some delay in late 1592 or early 1593. Sanderson arranged entertainments at his home in Newington Butts to mark the presentation of these globes to the Queen. His son William later reported the Queen's words on accepting the terrestrial globe: "The whole earth, a present for a Prince ..."; and on accepting the celestial globe, she said: "Thou hast presented me with the Heavens also: God guide me, to Govern my part of the one, that I may enjoy but a mansion place in this other." Elizabeth I saw globes and armillary spheres as symbols of her empire and spiritual mission on earth. The royal coat of arms contained in Elizabeth I Privy Seal was emblazoned across North America on the terrestrial globe.

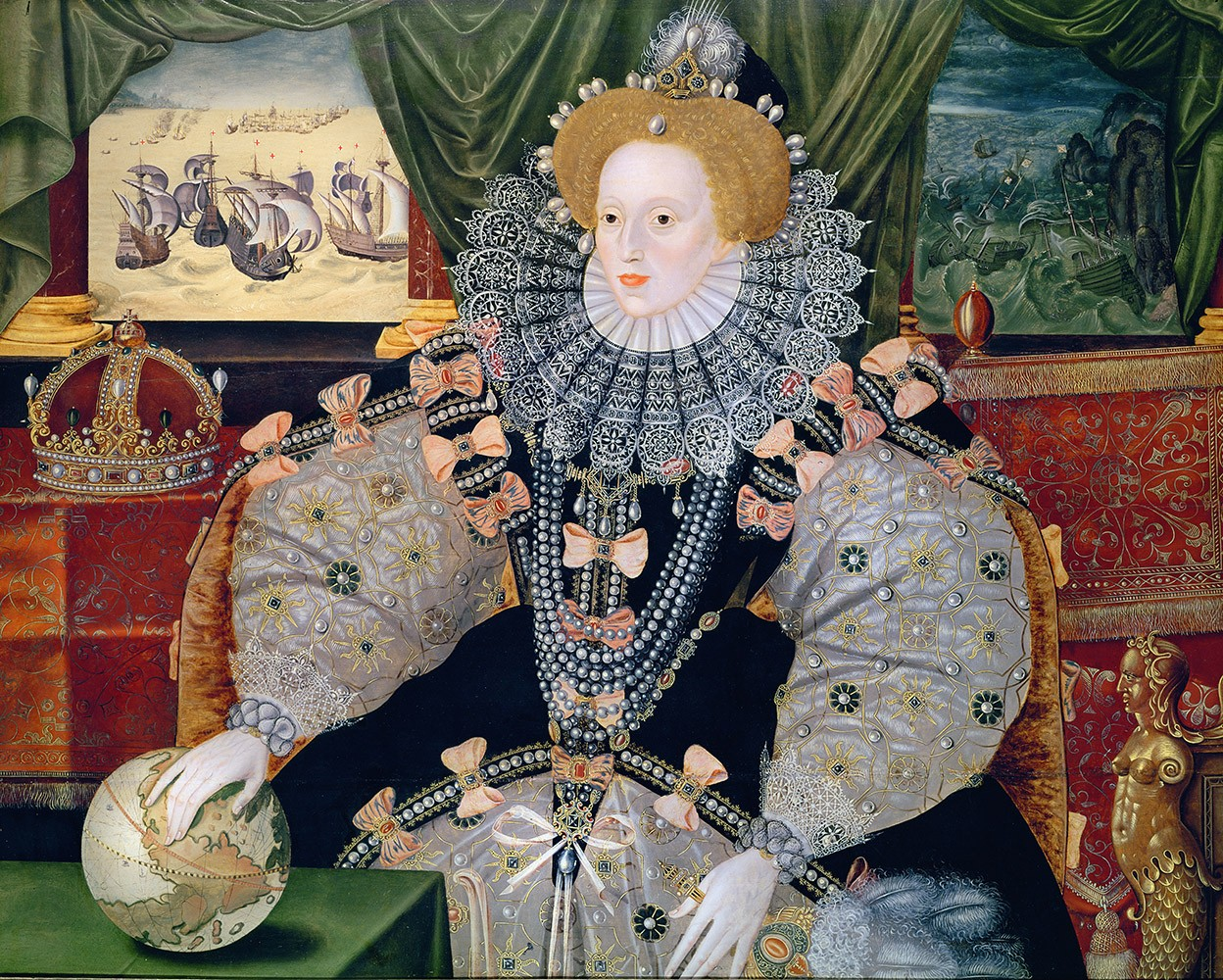
George Gower's Armada Portrait of Elizabeth I (1588?) at Woburn Abbey. At the top left, English galleons are about to engage the Spanish fleet, while on the right Spanish galleons are foundering in a storm. The Queen's right hand rests on a globe below the crown of England with "her fingers covering the Americas, indicating England's [command of the seas] and [dreams of establishing colonies] in the New World".

Several treatises were published to describe the Molyneux globes and provide guides on their use. Molyneux himself wrote a treatise, now lost, entitled The Globes Celestial and Terrestrial Set Forth in Plano, which Sanderson published in 1592. In the same year, Thomas Hood, a London-based mathematics lecturer who had written a 1590 work on the use of celestial globes, published The Vse of Both the Globes, Celestiall and Terrestriall. This was followed in 1594 by two works, one of which was Blundeville's book. The other, Tractatus de Globis et Eorum Usu (Treatise on Globes and their Use), was published by the mathematician Robert Hues. This work went into at least 13 printings and was translated from Latin into Dutch, English and French. In 1599, Edward Wright published Certaine Errors in Navigation, which included commentary on the use of the terrestrial and celestial globes developed by Molyneux.

According to Markham, "the appearance of the globes naturally created a great sensation, and much interest was taken in appliances which were equally useful to the student and to the practical navigator." The largest and most prestigious globes were priced at up to £20 each: these were purchased by royalty, noblemen and academic institutions. Among the purchasers were Thomas Bodley and the Warden of All Souls College, for their libraries in Oxford. William Sanderson presented the Universities of Oxford and Cambridge with a pair each. The public preacher Thomas Laughton made an inaugural gift of a Molyneux globe to the Shrewsbury School library. Smaller globes were also made, though no examples have survived. Sanderson is known to have presented one of these to Robert Cecil in 1595, together with Hues' "Latin booke that teacheth the use of my great globes". Intended as practical navigation aids, they cost as little as £2.

The globes provided navigators and students with methods for finding the place of the sun, latitude, course, distance, amplitudes, azimuths, time and declination. They proved such a boon to navigation that they came into widespread use on ships. In the dedication of his 1595 book The Seamans Secrets to the Lord High Admiral, Charles Howard, 1st Earl of Nottingham, navigator John Davis spoke of "the mechanical practices drawn from the Arts of Mathematick, [in which] our Country doth yield men of principal excellency", and he noted "Mr Emery Mullenenx for the exquisite making of Globes bodies".

== Later life ==
In the 1590s, Molyneux sought Elizabeth I's patronage for the production of a cannon, which he described as his "new invention, of shot and artillery, to be used principally in naval warfare: protection of ports and harbours, a new shot to discharge a thousand musket shot; with wildfire not to be quenched". In March 1593, Molyneux was issued with a royal warrant. Two years later, the merchant Robert Parkes purchased coal, saltpetre, pitch, oils and waxes for him, possibly for the cannon. On 4 November 1596 the Privy Council urged the Lord High Admiral "to speak to Molyneux, Bussy and the two Engelberts about their offensive engines" as part of measures to defend England's south coast. It appears the request was ignored. On 27 September 1594, the Queen granted Molyneux a gift of £200 and an annuity of £50. He chose to surrender the latter when, some time between March or April 1596 and 4 June 1597, he and his wife Anne emigrated to Amsterdam, Holland. Wallis has conjectured that he took with him the printing plates for the globes and sold them to Hondius, who had returned to Amsterdam in 1593.

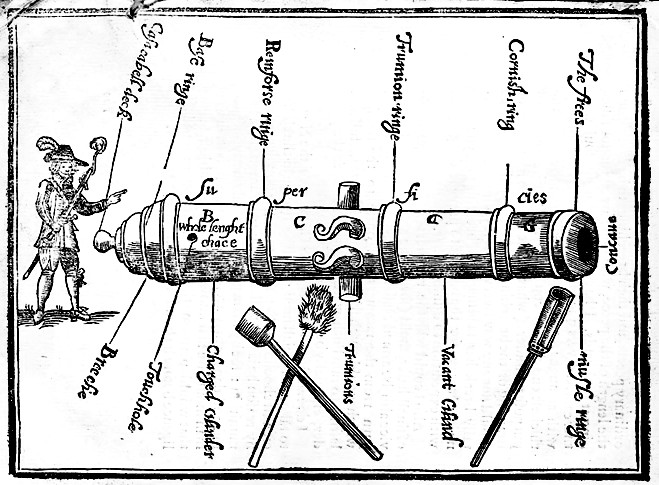
A diagram of a cannon from John Roberts' The Compleat Cannoniere (1652)

Why Molyneux left England for Holland is unclear. The Oxford Dictionary of National Biography suggests it was to be able to personally distribute his globes to European princes, since Amsterdam was then quickly establishing itself as the centre of globe- and map-making. However, this could not have been his intention if he had sold the globes' plates to Hondius. It is possible that he had decided to concentrate on manufacturing ordnance. On 26 January 1598, the States-General, the parliament of the United Provinces, showed interest in Molyneux's cannon and granted him a 12-year privilege on an invention. On 6 June he lodged a second application, but he died in Amsterdam almost immediately afterwards. His wife was granted administration of his estate in England later that month. It seems that Molyneux died in poverty, because Anne was granted a Dutch compassionate pension of 50 florins on 9 April 1599. Molyneux apparently had no other surviving family, and the English globe-making industry died with him. No other globes appear to have been manufactured in England until the appearance in the 1670s of globes by Robert Morden and William Berry, and by Joseph Moxon. However, over 40 years after Molyneux's death, William Sanderson the younger wrote that his globes were "yet in being, great and small ones, Celestiall and Terrestriall, in both our Universities and severall Libraries (here, and beyond Seas)".

== Influence ==
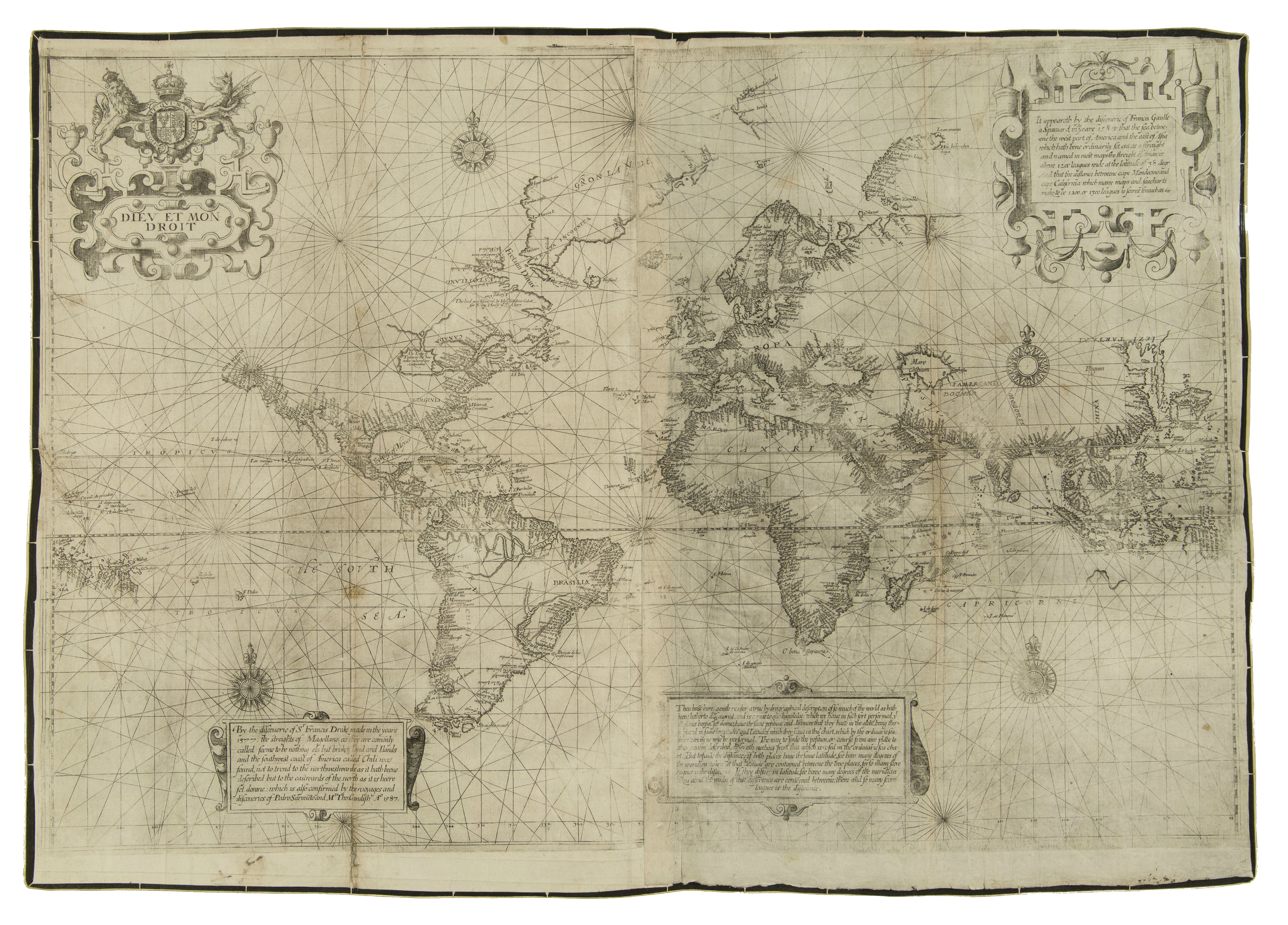
Edward Wright's "Chart of the World on Mercator's Projection" (c. 1599), otherwise known as the Wright–Molyneux map

=== Cartography ===
In the second volume of the greatly expanded version of his book The Principal Navigations, Voiages, Traffiques and Discoueries of the English Nation (1599), Hakluyt published what is known today as the Wright–Molyneux Map. Created by Edward Wright and based on Molyneux's terrestrial globe, it was the first map to use Wright's improvements on Mercator's projection.

Having, it is believed, purchased the plates of Molyneux's globes, Jodocus Hondius was granted a ten-year privilege on 1 April 1597 to make and publish a terrestrial globe. In that year, he produced in Amsterdam a Dutch translation of Hues' Tractatus de Globis. On 31 October 1598, despite a legal challenge by rival globe-maker Jacob van Langren, Hondius obtained another privilege for ten years. He duly published globes in 1600 and 1601, and his sons Henricus and Jodocus published a pair in 1613. Hondius also published a world map in 1608 on the Mercator projection. Its reliance on the Molyneux globe is shown by a number of legends, names and outlines which must have been copied directly from it.

In his globes of 1612, van Langeren incorporated the improvements made by Hondius the Elder to Molyneux's globe. It is believed that the Hondius globes also spurred Willem Blaeu to start constructing his large globes in 1616, which were published in 1622. Molyneux's globes therefore may have indirectly influenced the evolution of Dutch globe-making.

=== Culture ===
The appearance of Molyneux's globes had a significant influence on the culture of his time. In Shakespeare's The Comedy of Errors, written between 1592 and 1594, one of the protagonists, Dromio of Syracuse, compares a kitchen maid to a terrestrial globe: "No longer from head to foot than from hip to hip: she is spherical, like a globe; I could find out countries in her." The jest gained its point from the publication of the globes; Shakespeare may even have seen them himself. Elizabethan dramatist Thomas Dekker wrote in one of his plays published in The Gull's Horn-book (1609):

What an excellent workman, therefore, were he that could cast the globe of it into a new mould. And not to make it look like Molyneux his globe, with a round face sleeked and washed over with white of eggs, but have it in plano as it was at first, with all the ancient circles, lines, parallels and figures.

It has been suggested that the Lord Chamberlain's Men, the playing company that Shakespeare worked for as an actor and playwright for most of his career, named their playing space the Globe Theatre, built in 1599, as a response to the growing enthusiasm for terrestrial and celestial globes stimulated by those of Molyneux.

In Twelfth Night (1600–1601), Shakespeare alluded to the Wright–Molyneux Map when Maria says of Malvolio: "He does smile his face into more lynes, than is in the new Mappe, with the augmentation of the Indies."

== Globes today ==
Only six Molyneux globes are known to exist today, two terrestrial globes and four celestial globes. Three celestial globes are in Germany, one each in Zerbst, Nuremberg (at the Germanisches Nationalmuseum) and Kassel (Hessisches Landesmuseum). The Hessisches Landesmuseum once had a 1592 terrestrial globe, but it is believed to have been destroyed during World War II. Three globes remain in England: one pair, consisting of a terrestrial and a celestial globe, is owned by Middle Temple in London and displayed in its library, while a terrestrial globe is at Petworth House in Petworth, West Sussex.

=== Petworth House globe ===
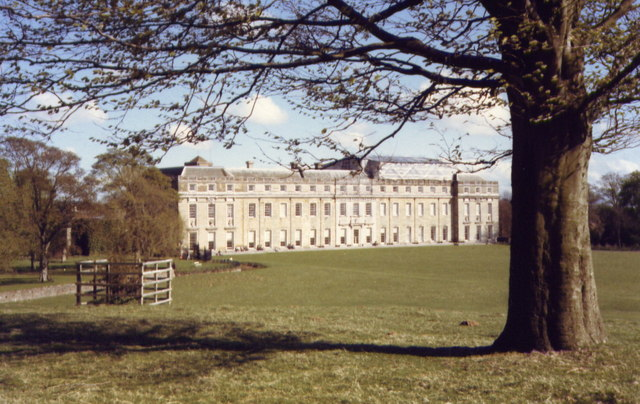
Petworth House, West Sussex, in 1986

A terrestrial globe was discovered in Lord Leconfield's library at Petworth House in Petworth, West Sussex, in July 1949. According to the tradition of the Wyndham family, who are descended from Henry Percy, 9th Earl of Northumberland, the globe belonged to Sir Walter Raleigh, who gave it to Northumberland when they were imprisoned together in the Tower of London. Northumberland, known as the "Wizard Earl" for his interest in scientific and alchemical experiments and his library, was suspected of being involved in the Gunpowder Plot of 1605 because his relative Thomas Percy was among the conspirators. James I imprisoned Raleigh in the Tower for his supposed involvement in the Main Plot. Although the theory is supported by circumstantial evidence, a number of entries in Northumberland's accounts relating to the mending of globes, one dating back to 1596, suggest that the Molyneux globe may have belonged to him from the beginning and was not Raleigh's. The globe, however, almost certainly spent many years in the Tower before its transfer to Petworth House, where Northumberland was confined upon his release in 1621.

The Petworth House globe, now in the North Gallery, is the only Molyneux terrestrial globe preserved in its original 1592 state. One of Molyneux's "great globes", measuring 2 feet 1 inch (0.64 m) in diameter, it was reported in 1952 to be in poor condition despite restoration by the British Museum the previous year. The Northern Hemisphere was darkened by dirt and badly rubbed in places, to the extent that it was hard to read. Parts of it, and large sections of the Southern Hemisphere, are missing altogether. The restoration work revealed that the globe is weighted with sand and made from layers of small pieces of paper overlaid with a coat of plaster about ^{1}/_{8} inch (3 mm) thick. On top of this is another layer of paper over which the gores are pasted. The globe retains its wooden horizon circle and brass meridian ring, but its hour circle and index are missing. Further restoration took place between 1995 and 1997. The globe was exhibited at the Royal Geographical Society in 1951 and 1952.

=== Middle Temple globes ===
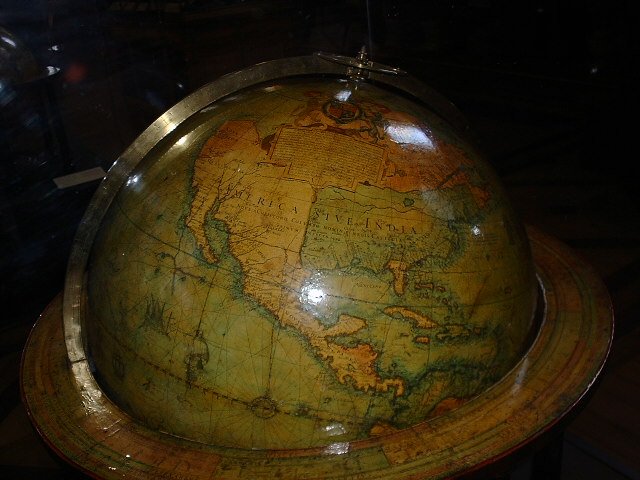
Molyneux's terrestrial globe temporarily exhibited at the British Museum on 27 November 2006

A bill in the accounts of 11 April 1717 for "repairing the globes in the library" is the earliest reference to the Middle Temple's ownership of the Molyneux terrestrial and celestial globes. Markham's view was that Robert Ashley (1565–1641), a barrister of the Middle Temple who was also an ardent geographer, was likely to have left the globes to the Inn in his will, together with his books. Ashley's books formed the nucleus of the Inn's original library and included copies of the second edition of Hues' Tractatus de Globis and other works on cosmography. On the other hand, Wallis has said that Markham's view is not supported by any available evidence and the globes are not mentioned in the will. She believes that they were probably acquired by Middle Temple on their publication in 1603.

The celestial globe is dated 1592, but the terrestrial globe bears the year 1603 and is the only example of its kind. Wallis has surmised that the globes were made by Hondius in Amsterdam in 1603 for a purchaser in England, perhaps the Middle Temple itself. The celestial globe was made from the original 1592 printing plates, while the terrestrial globe was produced using revised plates redated to 1603. The Middle Temple terrestrial globe differs from the Petworth House globe of 1592 by incorporating Raleigh's discoveries in Guiana and adding new place-names in Brazil, Peru and Africa, as well as an island marked "Corea" off the coast of China. The most extensive revision altered the Northeast Passage to take account of discoveries made on Willem Barentsz's third voyage to Novaya Zemlya in 1596. It appears that the revisions to the original plates of Molyneux's globe were completed by 1597, because no discoveries after that year are included. It is possible that Molyneux helped Hondius to update the plates in 1596 or 1597. For instance, if Hondius had obtained a copy of Raleigh's map of Guiana, Molyneux was the most likely source. Unlike the Petworth House globe, the Middle Temple globes are heavily varnished. The varnish could have been first applied as early as 1818 when the globes were repaired by J. and W. Newton; they were certainly varnished by Messrs. Holland Hannen & Cubitts, Ltd. during maintenance work in 1930.

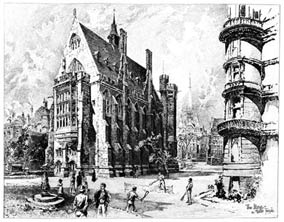
A drawing of Middle Temple Library in 1892 by Herbert Railton

At the start of World War II, the globes were sent to Beaconsfield and stored with part of the Wallace Collection at Hall Barn in the care of Lady Burnham. They were brought back to London in 1945 and were at one stage kept in the King's Library on loan to the British Museum. The globes were installed in their present position in the Middle Temple Library when the current library building opened in 1958. In 2003, they were loaned to the National Maritime Museum for an exhibition commemorating the life of Elizabeth I.

In 2004, Middle Temple proposed selling the Molyneux globes, valued at over £1 million, to create a scholarship fund for the education and training of needy would-be barristers. Its members eventually decided by a large majority against such a move. There was also a general feeling that the globes should be made more accessible to those wishing to see them.

The Middle Temple's Molyneux globes are the subject of a book-length project, The Molyneux Globes: Mathematical Practice and Theory, by Lesley Cormack of the University of Alberta. The project examines the community of mathematicians, natural philosophers, instrument-makers, and gentlemen-virtuosi that developed around the creation of the Molyneux globes, particularly the histories of four men who wrote treatises about the globes and the larger mathematical community.

=== Hessisches Landesmuseum globe ===
The Molyneux globes at the Hessisches Landesmuseum, Kassel, were inherited from the collection of William IV, Landgrave of Hesse-Kassel, a pioneer of astronomical research. William himself died in 1592, so it has been surmised that his son and successor, Maurice, purchased the globes for the collection. They were first mentioned in 1765 in the index of the Mathematische Kammer (Mathematics Chamber) of the Fürstliches Kunsthaus (Princely Art Gallery) in Kassel, during the reign of Landgrave Frederick II. Only a celestial globe survives today; it is believed that the terrestrial globe was destroyed during World War II.

== Early books about Molyneux's globes ==
- Hood, Thomas (1592), The Vse of both the Globes, Celestiall, and Terrestriall most Plainely Deliuered in Forme of a Dialogue. Containing most Pleasant, and Profitable Conclusions for the Mariner, and Generally for all those, that are Addicted to these Kinde of Mathematicall Instrumentes. VVritten by T. Hood Mathematicall Lecturer in the Citie of London, sometime Fellow of Trinitie Colledge in Cambridge, London: Imprinted ... at the three Cranes in the Vintree, by Thomas Dawson, OCLC 222243462. A modern reprint was published as:
  - Hood, Thomas (1971), The Use of Both the Globes, Celestiall and Terrestriall, Amsterdam; New York, N.Y.: Theatrum Orbis Terrarum; Da Capo Press, Bibcode:1971ubgc.book.....H, ISBN 978-90-221-0389-0.
- Hues, Robert (1594), Tractatus de globis et eorum usu: accommodatus iis qui Londini editi sunt anno 1593, sumptibus Gulielmi Sandersoni civis Londinensis, conscriptus à Roberto Hues [Treatise on Globes and their Use: Adapted to those which have been Published in London in the Year 1593, at the Expense of William Sanderson, a London Resident, Written by Robert Hues], London: In ædibus Thomæ Dawson [in the house of Thomas Dawson], OCLC 61370973 (in Latin). Octavo. The work went into 12 other printings in Dutch (1597, 1613 and 1622), English (1638 and 1659), French (1618) and Latin (1611, 1613, 1617, 1627, 1659 and 1663), and a modern reprint of the English version was published as:
  - Hues, Robert (1889), Markham, Clements R. (ed.), Tractatus de globis et eorum usu: A Treatise Descriptive of the Globes Constructed by Emery Molyneux and Published in 1592 [Hakluyt Society, 1st ser., pt. II, no. 79a], London: Hakluyt Society, ISBN 978-0-8337-1759-7, OCLC 149869781.
- Blundeville, Thomas (1594), M. Blundevile His Exercises containing Sixe Treatises, the Titles wherof are Set Down in the Next Printed Page: Which Treatises are Verie Necessarie to be Read and Learned of all Yoong Gentlemen that haue not bene Exercised in such Disciplines, and yet are Desirous to haue Knowledge as well in Cosmographie, Astronomie, and Geographie, as also in the Arte of Navigation ... To the Furtherance of which Arte of Navigation, the said M. Blundevile Speciallie Wrote the said Treatises and of Meere Good Will doth Dedicate the same to all the Young Gentlemen of this Realme, London: Printed by Iohn Windet, dwelling at the signe of the crosse Keies, neere Paules wharffe, and are there to be solde, OCLC 55186822. Further editions were published, including those in 1606 (3rd), 1613 (4th), 1636 (7th) and 1638 (7th, "corrected and somewhat enlarged"). The work includes (at pp. 515–519 of the 7th ed.), a description of Molyneux's globes and an account of Sir Francis Drake's voyage around the world.
- Wright, Edward (1599), Certaine Errors in Navigation: Arising either of the Ordinarie Erroneous Making or Vsing of the Sea Chart, Compasse, Crosse Staffe, and Tables of Declination of the Sunne, and Fixed Starres Detected and Corrected, London: Printed ... by Valentine Sims. Another version of the work published in the same year was entitled Wright, Edward (1599), Errors in nauigation 1 Error of two, or three whole points of the compas, and more somtimes [sic], by reason of making the sea-chart after the accustomed maner ... 2 Error of one whole point, and more many times, by neglecting the variation of the compasse. 3 Error of a degree and more sometimes, in the vse of the crosse staffe ... 4 Error of 11. or 12. minures [sic] in the declination of the sunne, as it is set foorth in the regiments most commonly vsed among mariners: and consequently error of halfe a degree in the place of the sunne. 5 Error of halfe a degree, yea an whole degree and more many times in the declinations of the principall fixed starres, set forth to be obserued by mariners at sea. Detected and corrected by often and diligent obseruation. Whereto is adioyned, the right H. the Earle of Cumberland his voyage to the Azores in the yeere 1589. wherin were taken 19. Spanish and Leaguers ships, together with the towne and platforme of Fayal, London: Printed ... [by Valentine Simmes and W. White] for Ed. Agas, OCLC 55176994. Mentions the use of Molyneux's terrestrial and celestial globes. Two further editions were published in 1610 and 1657, and the work was reprinted as:
  - Wright, Edward (1974), Certaine errors in navigation; the voyage of ... George Earle of Cumberl. to the Azores, Amsterdam; Norwood, N.J.: Theatrum Orbis Terrarum; Walter J. Johnson, OCLC 1359008.
