= Rodrigo Zamorano =

Spanish cosmographer

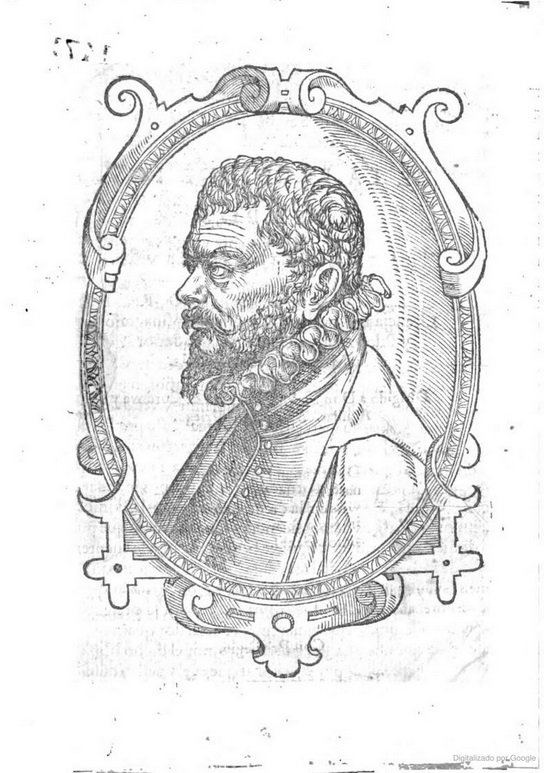

Rodrigo Zamorano (1542–1620) was a cosmographer of the royal house of Philip II of Spain.

Zamorano was born in Valladolid. He was author of several books on navigation, astronomy, calendars and mathematics. He was, at one time, placed in charge of the Casa de Contratación.

In 1576, he translated Euclid's Elements into Spanish. He died in Seville.

The mathematician Edward Wright incorporated a translation of Zamorano's Compendio de la Arte de Navegar into his own work, Certaine Errors in Navigation, in 1599.
