= Little Hereford =

Village in Herefordshire, England

Coordinates: 52.312°N 2.657°W

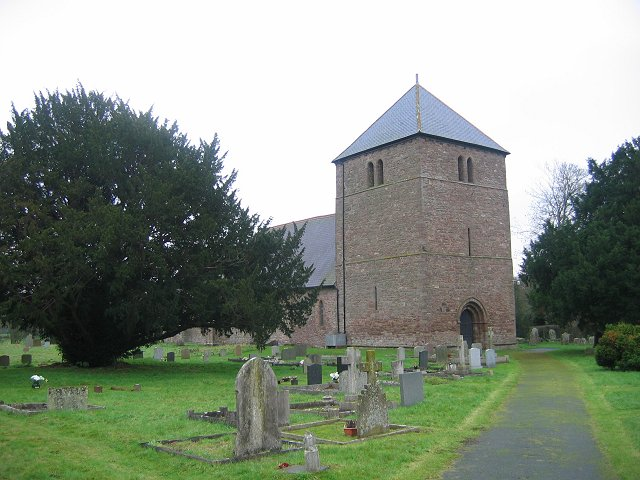
- St Mary Magdalene, Little Hereford

- Location within Herefordshire
- Population: 394 (2011 Census)
- Unitary authority: Herefordshire
- Shire county: Herefordshire
- Region: West Midlands
- Country: England
- Sovereign state: United Kingdom
- Post town: Ludlow
- Postcode district: SY8
- Police: West Mercia
- Fire: Hereford and Worcester
- Ambulance: West Midlands
- UK Parliament: North Herefordshire

Little Hereford is a small village and civil parish in Herefordshire, England. The civil parish includes the hamlet of Middleton. The population of the civil parish at the 2011 census was 394.

== Location ==
The village is in the north of the county and is almost surrounded by the counties of Worcestershire and Shropshire. The parish is situated between the Ledwyche Brook and the River Teme, though a small part of the parish lies to the south of the river.

The nearest town to the village is Tenbury Wells. Nearby parishes are Burford, Shropshire, Brimfield and Tenbury.

== Amenities ==
The village hall is a striking black and white survival, and is a landmark on the A456 road. There is also a historic church dedicated to Saint Mary Magdalene. There used to be a school with Agnas Challiss as headteacher.

== Notable sons ==
- Robert Hues (1553 – 24 May 1632) the English mathematician was born here.
