= Edward Wright (mathematician) =

English mathematician and cartographer (1561–1615)

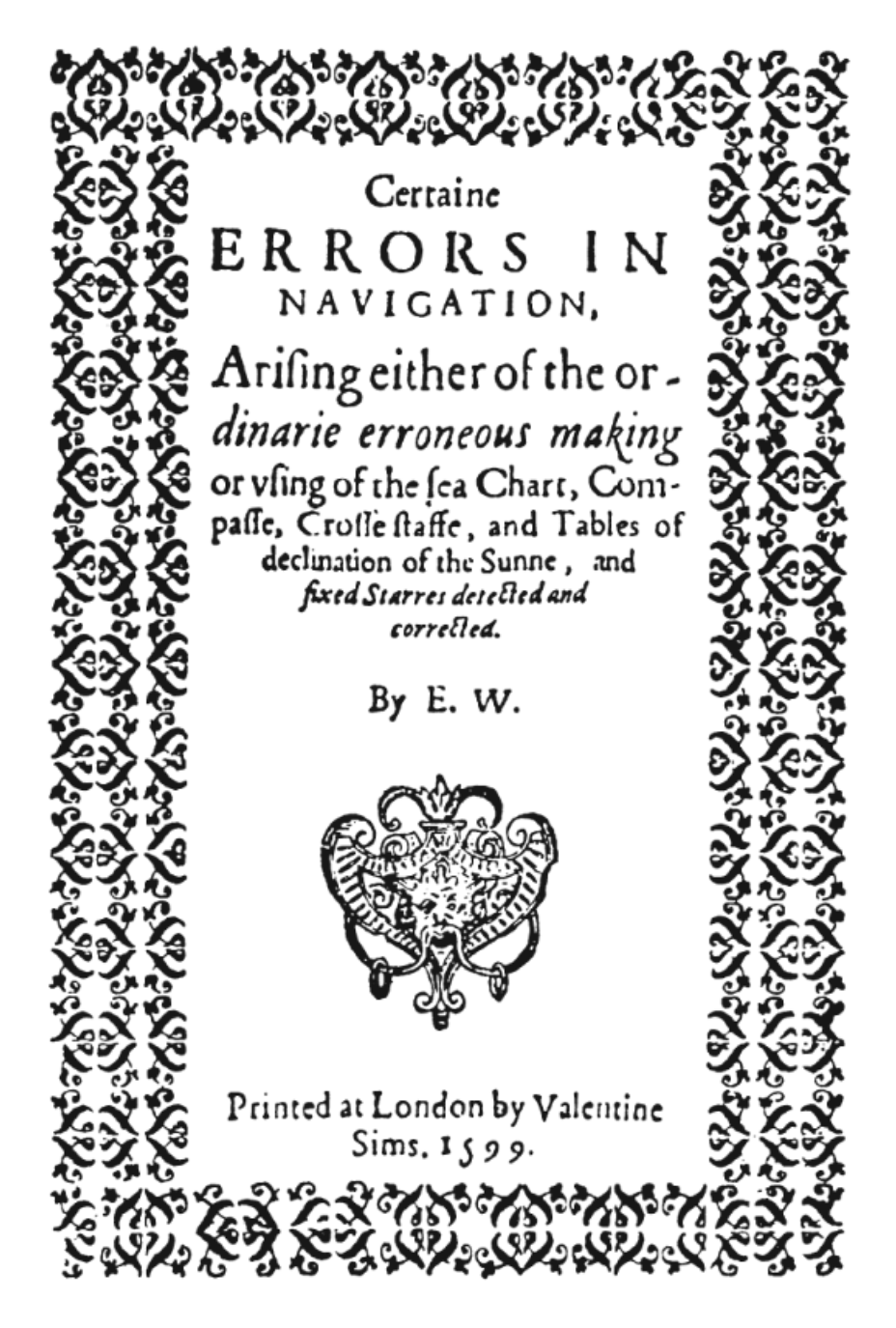
- Title page of the first edition of Wright's Certaine Errors in Navigation (1599)
- Born: Garveston, Norfolk, East Anglia, England
- Died: November 1615 (aged at least 54); London, England
- Education: Gonville and Caius College, Cambridge
- Known for: Writing Certaine Errors in Navigation (1599) which first explained the mathematical basis for the Mercator projection, producing the Wright–Molyneux map (c. 1599), and translating John Napier's work on logarithms which was published as A Description of the Admirable Table of Logarithmes (1616)
- Scientific career
- Fields: Mathematics; navigation; cartography

Edward Wright (baptised 8 October 1561; died November 1615) was an English mathematician and cartographer noted for his book Certaine Errors in Navigation (1599; 2nd ed., 1610), which for the first time explained the mathematical basis of the Mercator projection by building on the works of Pedro Nunes, and set out a reference table giving the linear scale multiplication factor as a function of latitude, calculated for each minute of arc up to a latitude of 75°. This was in fact a table of values of the integral of the secant function, and was the essential step needed to make practical both the making and the navigational use of Mercator charts.

Wright was born at Garveston in Norfolk and educated at Gonville and Caius College, Cambridge, where he became a fellow from 1587 to 1596. In 1589 the college granted him leave after Elizabeth I requested that he carry out navigational studies with a raiding expedition organised by the Earl of Cumberland to the Azores to capture Spanish galleons. The expedition's route was the subject of the first map to be prepared according to Wright's projection, which was published in Certaine Errors in 1599. The same year, Wright created and published the first world map produced in England and the first to use the Mercator projection since Gerardus Mercator's original 1569 map.

Not long after 1600 Wright was appointed as surveyor to the New River project, which successfully directed the course of a new man-made channel to bring clean water from Ware, Hertfordshire, to Islington, London. Around this time, Wright also lectured mathematics to merchant seamen, and from 1608 or 1609 was mathematics tutor to the son of James I, the heir apparent Henry Frederick, Prince of Wales, until the latter's very early death at the age of 18 in 1612. A skilled designer of mathematical instruments, Wright made models of an astrolabe and a pantograph, and a type of armillary sphere for Prince Henry. In the 1610 edition of Certaine Errors he described inventions such as the "sea-ring" that enabled mariners to determine the magnetic variation of the compass, the sun's altitude and the time of day in any place if the latitude was known; and a device for finding latitude when one was not on the meridian using the height of the pole star.

Apart from a number of other books and pamphlets, Wright translated John Napier's pioneering 1614 work which introduced the idea of logarithms from Latin into English. This was published after Wright's death as A Description of the Admirable Table of Logarithmes (1616). Wright's work influenced, among other persons, Dutch astronomer and mathematician Willebrord Snellius; Adriaan Metius, the geometer and astronomer from Holland; and the English mathematician Richard Norwood, who calculated the length of a degree on a great circle of the earth using a method proposed by Wright.

== Family and education ==
The younger son of Henry and Margaret Wright, Edward Wright was born in the village of Garveston in Norfolk, East Anglia, and was baptised there on 8 October 1561. It is possible that he followed in the footsteps of his elder brother Thomas (died 1579) and went to school in Hardingham. The family was of modest means, and he matriculated at Gonville and Caius College, University of Cambridge, on 8 December 1576 as a sizar. Sizars were students of limited means who were charged lower fees and obtained free food and/or lodging and other assistance during their period of study, often in exchange for performing work at their colleges.

Wright was conferred a Bachelor of Arts (B.A.) in 1580–1581. He remained a scholar at Caius, receiving his Master of Arts (M.A.) there in 1584, and holding a fellowship between 1587 and 1596. At Cambridge, he was a close friend of Robert Devereux, later the Second Earl of Essex, and met him to discuss his studies even in the weeks before Devereux's rebellion against Elizabeth I in 1600–1601. In addition, he came to know the mathematician Henry Briggs; and the soldier and astrologer Christopher Heydon, who was also Devereux's friend. Heydon later made astronomical observations with instruments Wright made for him.

== Foreign expedition ==
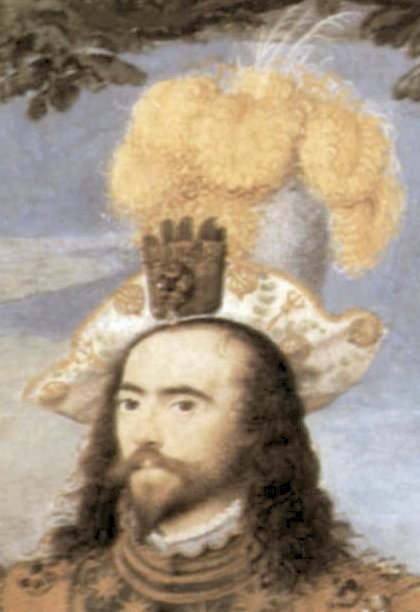
Hilliard's portrait of George, Earl of Cumberland (c. 1590, detail). Wright dedicated his work Certaine Errors in Navigation (1599) to him.

In 1589, two years after being appointed to his fellowship, Wright was requested by Elizabeth I to carry out navigational studies with a raiding expedition organised by the Earl of Cumberland to the Azores to capture Spanish galleons. The Queen effectively ordered Caius to grant him leave of absence for this purpose, although the college expressed this more diplomatically by granting him a sabbatical "by Royal mandate". Wright participated in the confiscation of "lawful" prizes from the French, Portuguese and Spanish – Derek Ingram, a life fellow of Caius, has called him "the only Fellow of Caius ever to be granted sabbatical leave in order to engage in piracy". Wright sailed with Cumberland in the Victory from Plymouth on 8 June 1589; they returned to Falmouth on 27 December of the same year. An account of the expedition is appended to Wright's work Certaine Errors of Navigation (1599), and while it refers to Wright in the third person it is believed to have been written by him.

In Wright's account of the Azores expedition, he listed as one of the expedition's members a "Captaine Edwarde Carelesse, alias Wright, who in S. Frauncis Drakes West-Indian voiage was Captaine of the Hope". In another work, The Haven-finding Art (1599) (see below), Wright stated that "the time of my first employment at sea" was "now more than tenne yeares since". The Oxford Dictionary of National Biography asserts that during the expedition Wright called himself "Captain Edward Carelesse", and that he was also the captain of the Hope in Sir Francis Drake's voyage of 1585–1586 to the West Indies, which evacuated Sir Walter Raleigh's Colony of Virginia. One of the colonists was the mathematician Thomas Harriot, and if the Dictionary is correct it is probable that on the return journey to England Wright and Harriot became acquainted and discussed navigational mathematics. However, in a 1939 article, E.J.S. Parsons and W.F. Morris note that in Capt. Walter Bigges and Lt. Crofts' book A Summarie and True Discourse of Sir Frances Drakes West Indian Voyage (1589), Edward Careless was referred to as the commander of the Hope, but Wright was not mentioned. Further, while Wright spoke several times of his participation in the Azores expedition, he never alluded to any other voyage. Although the reference to his "first employment" in The Haven-finding Art suggests an earlier venture, there is no evidence that he went to the West Indies. Gonville and Caius College holds no records showing that Wright was granted leave before 1589. There is nothing to suggest that Wright ever went to sea again after his expedition with the Earl of Cumberland.

Wright resumed his Cambridge fellowship upon returning from the Azores in 1589, but it appears that he soon moved to London for he was there with Christopher Heydon making observations of the sun between 1594 and 1597, and on 8 August 1595 Wright married Ursula Warren (died 1625), a daughter of Augustine Bernher, at the parish church of St. Michael, Cornhill, in the City of London. They had a son, Samuel (1596–1616), who was himself admitted as a sizar at Caius on 7 July 1612. The St. Michael parish register also contains references to other children of Wright, all of whom died before 1617. Wright resigned his fellowship in 1596.

== Mathematician and cartographer ==
=== Certaine Errors in Navigation ===
Wright explained the Mercator projection with the analogy of a sphere being inflated like a bladder inside a hollow cylinder. The sphere is expanded uniformly, so that the meridians lengthen in the same proportion as the parallels, until each point of the expanding spherical surface comes into contact with the inside of the cylinder. This process preserves the local shape and angles of features on the surface of the original globe, at the expense of parts of the globe with different latitudes becoming expanded by different amounts. The cylinder is then opened out into a two-dimensional rectangle. The projection is a boon to navigators as rhumb lines are depicted as straight lines.

Wright helped the mathematician and globe maker Emery Molyneux to plot coastlines on his terrestrial globe, and translated some of the explanatory legends into Latin. Molyneux's terrestrial and celestial globes, the first to be manufactured in England, were published in late 1592 or early 1593, and Wright explained their use in his 1599 work Certaine Errors in Navigation. He dedicated the book to Cumberland, to whom he had presented a manuscript of the work in 1592, stating in the preface it was through Cumberland that he "was first moved, and received maintenance to divert my mathematical studies, from a theorical speculation in the Universitie, to the practical demonstration of the use of Navigation".

The navigation errors addressed by Wright in Certaine Errors in Navigation had been previously treated by Pedro Nunes, whose works had been compiled in Petri Nonii Salaciensis Opera in 1566 (later expanded, corrected and re-edited as De arte adque ratione navigandi in 1573). This is pointed out by Wright himself in the Preface:

Yet it may be, I shall be blamed by some, as being to busie a fault-finder myself. For when they shall, see their Charts and other instruments controlled which so long time have gone for current, some of them perhappes will scarcely with pacience endure it. But they may be pacified, if not by reason of the good that ensueth hereupon, yet towards me at the least because the errors I poynt at in the chart, have beene heretofore poynted out by others, especially by Petrus Nonius, out of whom most part of the first Chapter of the Treatise following is almost worde for worde translated;

This appeal to the authority of Pedro Nunes and the fact that the first chapter treats the Faults in the common Sea Chart, With Rumbes expressed by right lines and degrees of latitude, everywhere equal, show Nunes' influence in Wright's work. In addition, the effect of following a rhumb line course on the surface of a globe was first discussed by Pedro Nunes in 1537 in his Treatise in Defense of the Marine Chart. In this work, Nunes proposes the construction of a nautical atlas composed of several large-scale sheets in the cylindrical equidistant projection as a way to minimize distortion of directions. If these sheets were brought to the same scale and assembled, they would approximate the Mercator projection, later introduced by Gerardus Mercator in 1569. Mercator never explained the method of construction of the projection bearing his name, nor how he arrived at it. Various hypotheses have been tendered over the years, but in any case Mercator's friendship with Pedro Nunes and his access to the loxodromic tables Nunes created likely aided his efforts. Mercator's projection was advantageous for nautical purposes as it represented lines of constant true bearing or true course (rhumb lines), as straight lines.

In Certaine errors of navigation, Wright improved and diversified Nunes' charting method, thus explaining the construction and use of the Mercator projection. As Wright himself puts it in Chapter 2:

By help of this planisphaere with the meridians, rumbes, and parallels thus described therein, the rumbs may much more easily & truly be drawn in the globe then by these mechanical wayes which Petrus Nonius [Pedro Nunes] teacheth cap. 26 lib. 2 de obser. Reg. et Instr. Geom..

In order to achieve this, Wright introduces the method for dividing the meridian, an explanation of how he had constructed a table for the division, and the uses of this information for navigation. On a globe, circles of latitude (also known as parallels) get smaller as they move away from the Equator towards the North or South Pole. Thus, in the Mercator projection, when a globe is "unwrapped" on to a rectangular map, the parallels need to be stretched to the length of the Equator. In addition, parallels are further apart as they approach the poles. Wright compiled a table with three columns. The first two columns contained the degrees and minutes of latitudes for parallels spaced 10 minutes apart on a sphere, while the third column had the parallel's projected distance from the Equator. Any cartographer or navigator could therefore lay out a Mercator grid for himself by consulting the table. Wright explained:

I first thought of correcting so many gross errors ... in the sea chart, by increasing the distances of the parallels, from the equinoctial towards the poles, in such sort, that at every point of latitude in the chart, a part of the meridian might have the same proportion to the like part of the parallel, that it has in the globe.

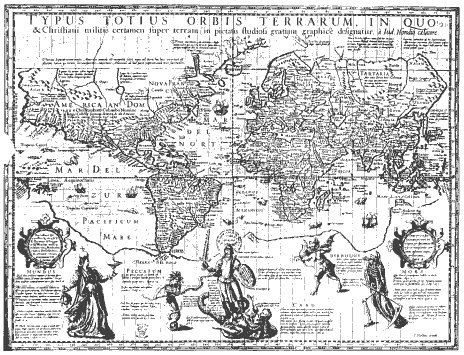
Hondius made use of Wright's calculations without acknowledgment in his "Christian Knight Map" of 1597, prompting Wright to publish Certaine Errors in Navigation in 1599.

While the first edition of Certaine Errors contained an abridged table six pages in length, in the second edition which appeared in 1610 Wright published a full table across 23 pages with figures for parallels at one-minute intervals. The table is remarkably accurate – American geography professor Mark Monmonier wrote a computer program to replicate Wright's calculations, and determined that for a Mercator map of the world 3 feet (0.91 m) wide, the greatest discrepancy between Wright's table and the program was only 0.00039 inches (0.0099 mm) on the map. In the second edition Wright also incorporated various improvements, including proposals for determining the magnitude of the Earth and reckoning common linear measurements as a proportion of a degree on the Earth's surface "that they might not depend on the uncertain length of a barley-corn"; a correction of errors arising from the eccentricity of the eye when making observations using the cross-staff; amendments in tables of declinations and the positions of the sun and the stars, which were based on observations he had made together with Christopher Heydon using a 6-foot (1.8 m) quadrant; and a large table of the variation of the compass as observed in different parts of the world, to show that it is not caused by any magnetic pole. He also incorporated a translation of Rodrigo Zamorano's Compendio de la Arte de Navegar (Compendium of the Art of Navigation, Seville, 1581; 2nd ed., 1588).

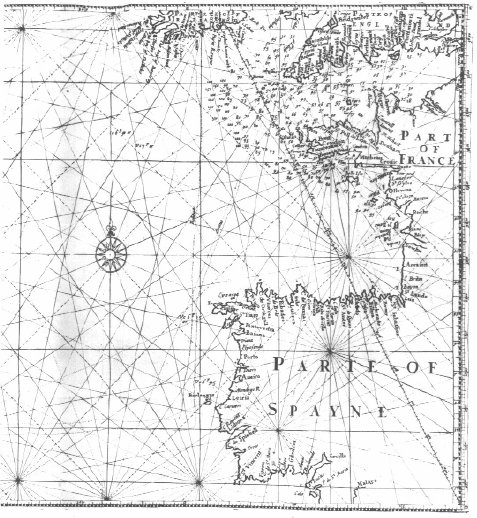
Edward Wright's map "for sailing to the Isles of Azores" (c. 1595), the first to be prepared according to his projection

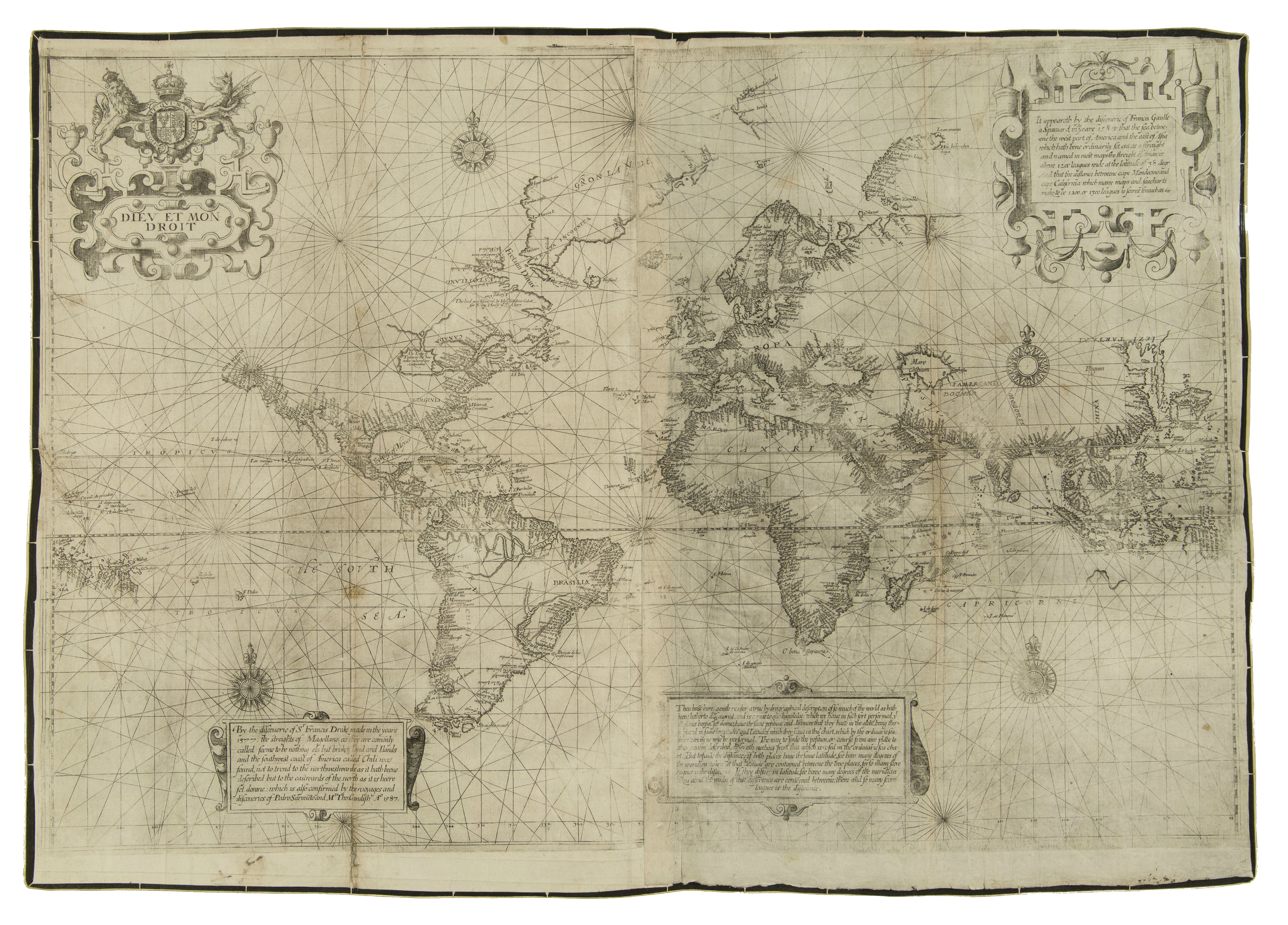
Wright's "Chart of the World on Mercator's Projection" (c. 1599), otherwise known as the Wright–Molyneux map

Wright was prompted to publish the book after two incidents of his text, which had been prepared some years earlier, being used without attribution. He had allowed his table of meridional parts to be published by Thomas Blundeville in his Exercises (1594) and in William Barlow's The Navigator's Supply (1597), although only Blundeville acknowledged Wright by name. However, an experienced navigator, believed to be Abraham Kendall, borrowed a draft of Wright's manuscript and, unknown to him, made a copy of it which he took on Sir Francis Drake's 1595 expedition to the West Indies. In 1596 Kendall died at sea. The copy of Wright's work in his possession was brought back to London and wrongly believed to be by Kendall, until the Earl of Cumberland passed it to Wright and he recognised it as his work. Also around this time, the Dutch cartographer Jodocus Hondius borrowed Wright's draft manuscript for a short time after promising not to publish its contents without his permission. However, Hondius then employed Wright's calculations without acknowledging him for several regional maps, and in his world map published in Amsterdam in 1597. This map is often referred to as the "Christian Knight Map" for its engraving of a Christian knight battling sin, the flesh and the Devil. Although Hondius sent Wright a letter containing a faint apology, Wright condemned Hondius's deceit and greed in the preface to Certaine Errors. He wryly commented: "But the way how this [Mercator projection] should be done, I learned neither of Mercator, nor of any man els. And in that point I wish I had beene as wise as he in keeping it more charily to myself".

The first map to be prepared according to Wright's projection was published in his book, and showed the route of Cumberland's expedition to the Azores. A manuscript version of this map is preserved at Hatfield House; it is believed to have been drawn about 1595. Following this, Wright created a new world map, the first map of the globe to be produced in England and the first to use the Mercator projection since Gerardus Mercator's 1569 original. Based on Molyneux's terrestrial globe, it corrected a number of errors in the earlier work by Mercator. The map, often called the Wright–Molyneux Map, first appeared in the second volume of Richard Hakluyt's The Principal Navigations, Voiages, Traffiques and Discoueries of the English Nation (1599). Unlike many contemporary maps and charts which contained fantastic speculations about unexplored lands, Wright's map has a minimum of detail and blank areas wherever information was lacking. The map was one of the earliest to use the name "Virginia". Shakespeare alluded to the map in Twelfth Night (1600–1601), when Maria says of Malvolio: "He does smile his face into more lynes, than is in the new Mappe, with the augmentation of the Indies." Another world map, larger and with updated details, appeared in the second edition of Certaine Errors (1610).

Wright translated into English De Havenvinding (1599) by the Flemish mathematician and engineer Simon Stevin, which appeared in the same year as The Haven-Finding Art, or the Way to Find any Haven or Place at Sea, by the Latitude and Variation. He also wrote the preface to physician and scientist William Gilbert's great work De Magnete, Magneticisque Corporibus, et de Magno Magnete Tellure (The Magnet, Magnetic Bodies, and the Great Magnet the Earth, 1600), in which Gilbert described his experiments which led to the conclusion that the Earth was magnetic, and introduced the term electricus to describe the phenomenon of static electricity produced by rubbing amber (called ēlectrum in Classical Latin, derived from 'ήλεκτρον (elektron) in Ancient Greek). According to the mathematician and physician Mark Ridley, chapter 12 of book 4 of De Magnete, which explained how astronomical observations could be used to determine the magnetic variation, was actually Wright's work.

Gilbert had invented a dip-compass and compiled a table recording the dip of the needle below the horizon. Wright believed that this device would prove to be extremely useful in determining latitude and, with the help of Blundeville and Briggs, wrote a small pamphlet called The Making, Description and Use of the Two Instruments for Seamen to find out the Latitude ... First Invented by Dr. Gilbert. It was published in 1602 in Blundeville's book The Theoriques of the Seuen Planets. That same year he authored The Description and Use of the Sphære (not published till 1613), and in 1605 published a new edition of the widely used work The Safegarde of Saylers.

=== Surveying ===
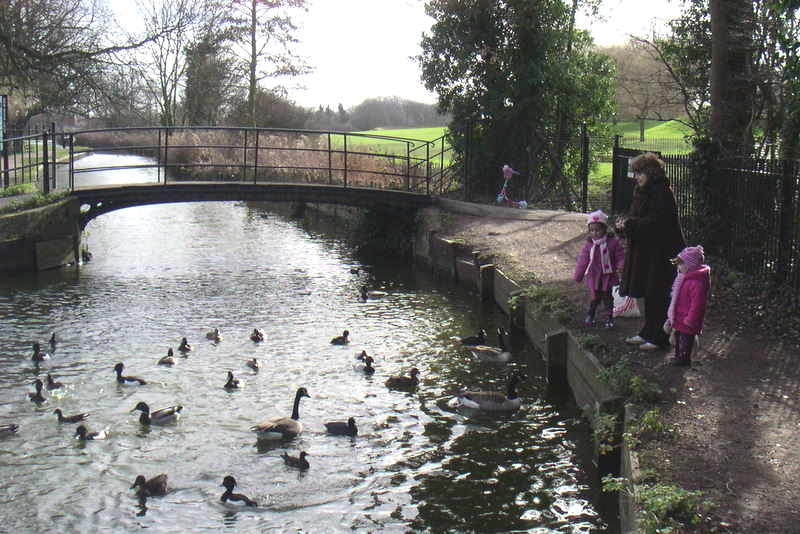
The New River at Enfield Town Park in London – photographed on 3 February 2008

Wright also developed a reputation as a surveyor on land. He prepared "a plat of part of the waye whereby a newe River may be brought from Uxbridge to St. James, Whitehall, Westminster [,] the Strand, St Giles, Holbourne and London", However, according to a 1615 paper in Latin in the annals of Gonville and Caius College at Cambridge, he was prevented from bringing this plan to fruition "by the tricks of others". Nonetheless, early in the first decade of the 17th century, he was appointed by Sir Hugh Myddelton as surveyor to the New River project, which successfully directed the course of a new man-made channel to bring clean water from Chadwell Spring at Ware, Hertfordshire, to Islington, London. Although the distance in a straight line from Ware to London is only slightly more than 20 miles (32 km), the project required a high degree of surveying skill on Wright's part as it was necessary for the river to take a route of over 40 miles following the 100-foot (30 m) contour line on the west side of the Lea Valley. As the technology of the time did not extend to large pumps or pipes, the water flow had to depend on gravity through canals or aqueducts over an average fall of 5.5 inches a mile (87.8 millimetres per kilometre).

Work on the New River started in 1608 – the date of a monument at Chadwell Spring – but halted near Wormley, Hertfordshire, in 1610. The stoppage has been attributed to factors such as Myddelton facing difficulties in raising funds, and landowners along the route opposing the acquisition of their lands on the ground that the river would turn their meadows into "bogs and quagmires". Although the landowners petitioned Parliament, they did not succeed in having the legislation authorising the project repealed prior to Parliament being dissolved in 1611; the work resumed later that year. The New River was officially opened on 29 September 1613 by the Lord Mayor of London, Sir John Swinnerton, at the Round Pond, New River Head, in Islington. It still supplies the capital with water today.

=== Other mathematical work ===
For some time Wright had urged that a navigation lectureship be instituted for merchant seamen, and he persuaded Admiral Sir William Monson, who had been on Cumberland's Azores expedition of 1589, to encourage a stipend to be paid for this. At the beginning of the 17th century, Wright succeeded Thomas Hood as a mathematics lecturer under the patronage of the wealthy merchants Sir Thomas Smyth and Sir John Wolstenholme; the lectures were held in Smyth's house in Philpot Lane. By 1612 or 1614 the East India Company had taken on sponsorship of these lectures for an annual fee of £50 (about £6,500 as of 2007). Wright was also mathematics tutor to the son of James I, the heir apparent Henry Frederick, Prince of Wales, from 1608 or 1609 until the latter's death at the age of 18 on 6 November 1612. Wright was described as "a very poor man" in the Prince's will and left the sum of £30 8s (about £4,300 in 2007). To the Prince, who was greatly interested in the science of navigation, Wright dedicated the second edition of Certaine Errors (1610) and the world map published therein. He also drew various maps for him, including a "sea chart of the N.-W. Passage; a paradoxall sea-chart of the World from 30° Latitude northwards; [and] a plat of the drowned groundes about Elye, Lincolnshire, Cambridgeshire, &c".

Wright was a skilled designer of mathematical instruments. According to the 1615 Caius annals, "[h]e was excellent both in contrivance and execution, nor was he inferior to the most ingenious mechanic in the making of instruments, either of brass or any other matter". For Prince Henry, he made models of an astrolabe and a pantograph, and created or arranged to be created out of wood a form of armillary sphere which replicated the motions of the celestial sphere, the circular motions of the sun and moon, and the places and possibilities of them eclipsing each other. The sphere was designed for a motion of 17,100 years, if the machine should last that long. In 1613 Wright published The Description and Use of the Sphære, which described the use of this device. The sphere was lost during the English Civil War, but found in 1646 in the Tower of London by the mathematician and surveyor Sir Jonas Moore, who was later appointed Surveyor General of the Ordnance Office and became a patron and the principal driving force behind the establishment of the Royal Observatory at Greenwich. Moore asked the King to let him have it, restored the instrument at his own expense and deposited it at his own house "in the Tower".

The Caius annals also report that Wright "had formed many other useful designs, but was hindered by death from bringing them to perfection". The 1610 edition of Certaine Errors contained descriptions of the "sea-ring", which consisted of a universal ring dial mounted over a magnetic compass that enabled mariners to determine readily the magnetic variation of the compass, the sun's altitude and the time of day in any place if the latitude was known; the "sea-quadrant", for the taking of altitudes by a forward or backward observation; and a device for finding latitude when one was not on the meridian using the height of the pole star.

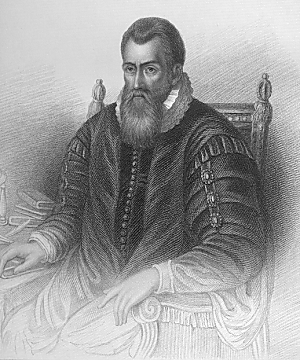
The Scotsman John Napier (1550–1617), the inventor of logarithms, depicted in an engraving by Samuel Freeman (1773–1857) based on a 1616 painting at the University of Edinburgh

In 1614 Wright published a small book called A Short Treatise of Dialling: Shewing, the Making of All Sorts of Sun-dials, but he was mainly preoccupied with John Napier's Mirifici Logarithmorum Canonis Descriptio (Description of the Wonderful Rule of Logarithms), which introduced the idea of logarithms. Wright at once saw the value of logarithms as an aid to navigation, and lost no time in preparing a translation which he submitted to Napier himself. The preface to Wright's edition consists of a translation of the preface to the Descriptio, together with the addition of the following sentences written by Napier himself:

But now some of our countreymen in this Island well affected to these studies, and the more publique good, procured a most learned Mathematician to translate the same into our vulgar English tongue, who after he had finished it, sent the Coppy of it to me, to bee seene and considered on by myselfe. I having most willingly and gladly done the same, finde it to bee most exact and precisely conformable to my minde and the originall. Therefore it may please you who are inclined to these studies, to receive it from me and the Translator, with as much good will as we recommend it unto you.

While working on the translation, Wright died in late November 1615 and was buried on 2 December 1615 at St. Dionis Backchurch (now demolished) in the City of London. The Caius annals noted that although he "was rich in fame, and in the promises of the great, yet he died poor, to the scandal of an ungrateful age". Wright's translation of Napier, which incorporated tables that Wright had supplemented and further information by Henry Briggs, was completed by Wright's son Samuel and arranged to be printed by Briggs. It appeared posthumously as A Description of the Admirable Table of Logarithmes in 1616, and in it Wright was lauded in verse as "[t]hat famous, learned, Errors true Corrector, / England's great Pilot, Mariners Director".

According to Parsons and Morris, the use of Wright's publications by later mathematicians is the "greatest tribute to his life's work". Wright's work was relied on by Dutch astronomer and mathematician Willebrord Snellius, noted for the law of refraction now known as Snell's law, for his navigation treatise Tiphys Batavus (Batavian Tiphys, 1624); and by Adriaan Metius, the geometer and astronomer from Holland, for Primum Mobile (1631). Following Wright's proposals, Richard Norwood measured a degree on a great circle of the earth at 367,196 feet (111,921 m), publishing the information in 1637. Wright was praised by Charles Saltonstall in The Navigator (1642) and by John Collins in Navigation by the Mariners Plain Scale New Plain'd (1659), Collins stating that Mercator's chart ought "more properly to be called Wright's chart". The Caius annals contained the following epitaph: "Of him it may truly be said, that he studied more to serve the public than himself".

== Works ==
=== Authored ===
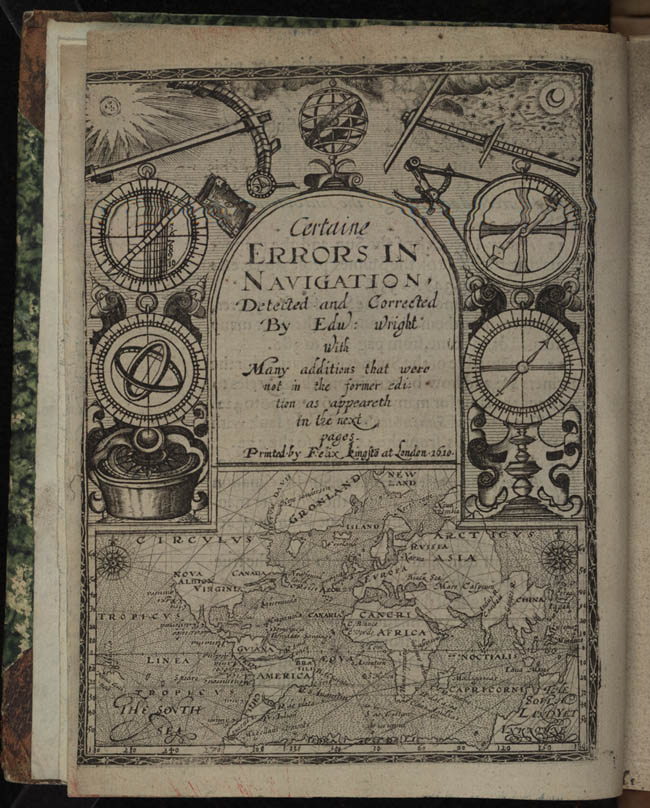
Title page of Wright's Certaine Errors in Navigation (Second edition, 1610)

- Wright, Edward (1599), Certaine Errors in Navigation, arising either of the Ordinarie Erroneous Making or Vsing of the Sea Chart, Compasse, Crosse Staffe, and Tables of Declination of the Sunne, and Fixed Starres Detected and Corrected. (The Voyage of the Right Ho. George Earle of Cumberl. to the Azores, &c.), London: Printed ... by Valentine Sims. Another version of the work published in the same year was entitled Wright, Edward (1599), Errors in nauigation 1 Error of two, or three whole points of the compas, and more somtimes [sic], by reason of making the sea-chart after the accustomed maner ... 2 Error of one whole point, and more many times, by neglecting the variation of the compasse. 3 Error of a degree and more sometimes, in the vse of the crosse staffe ... 4 Error of 11. or 12. minures [sic] in the declination of the sunne, as it is set foorth in the regiments most commonly vsed among mariners: and consequently error of halfe a degree in the place of the sunne. 5 Error of halfe a degree, yea an whole degree and more many times in the declinations of the principall fixed starres, set forth to be obserued by mariners at sea. Detected and corrected by often and diligent obseruation. Whereto is adioyned, the right H. the Earle of Cumberland his voyage to the Azores in the yeere 1589. wherin were taken 19. Spanish and Leaguers ships, together with the towne and platforme of Fayal, London: Printed ... [by Valentine Simmes and W. White] for Ed. Agas. Later editions and reprints:
  - Wright, Edward (1610), Certaine Errors in Navigation, Detected and Corrected with Many Additions that were not in the Former Edition... [with an Addition Touching the Variation of the Compasse], London: [s.n.].
  - Wright, Edward (1657), Certaine Errors in Navigation Detected and Corrected, with Many Additions that were not in the Former Edition.. (3rd ed.), London: J[oseph] Moxon.
  - Wright, Edward (1974), Certaine errors in navigation; the voyage of ... George Earle of Cumberl. to the Azores, Amsterdam; Norwood, N.J.: Theatrum Orbis Terrarum; Walter J. Johnson. Photoreprint of the 1599 edition.
- Chapter 12 of book 4 of Gilbert, William (1600), De Magnete, magneticisque corporibus, et de magno magnete tellure; Physiologia nova, plurimis & argumentis, & experimentis demonstrata [The Magnet, Magnetic Bodies, and the Great Magnet the Earth; New Natural Science, Demonstrated by Many Arguments and Experiments], London: Excudebat Petrus Short (Latin).
- The Making, Description and Use of the Two Instruments for Seamen to find out the Latitude ... First Invented by Dr. Gilbert, published in Blundeville, Thomas; Briggs, Henry; Wright, Edward (1602), The Theoriques of the Seuen Planets shewing all their Diuerse Motions, and all other Accidents, called Passions, thereunto Belonging. Now more Plainly set forth in our Mother Tongue by M. Blundeuile, than euer they haue been heretofore in any other Tongue whatsoeuer, and that with such Pleasant Demonstratiue Figures, as euery Man that hath any Skill in Arithmeticke, may easily Vnderstand the same. ... VVhereunto is added by the said Master Blundeuile, a Breefe Extract by him made, of Maginus his Theoriques, for the Better Vnderstanding of the Prutenicall Tables, to Calculate thereby the Diuerse Motions of the Seuen Planets. There is also hereto added, the Making, Description, and Vse, of Two Most Ingenious and Necessarie Instruments for Sea-men ... First Inuented by M. Doctor Gilbert ... and now here Plainely set downe in our Mother Tongue by Master Blundeuile, London: Printed by Adam Islip.
- Wright, Edward (1613), The Description and Vse of the Sphære. Deuided into Three Principal Partes: whereof the First Intreateth especially of the Circles of the Vppermost Moueable Sphære, and of the Manifould Vses of euery one of them Seuerally: the Second Sheweth the Plentifull Vse of the Vppermost Sphære, and of the Circles therof Ioyntly: the Third Conteyneth the Description of the Orbes whereof the Sphæres of the Sunne and Moone haue beene supposed to be Made, with their Motions and Vses. By Edward Wright. The Contents of each Part are more particularly Set Downe in the Table, London: Printed [by E. Allde] for Iohn Tap dwelling at S. Magnus corner. Later editions and reprints:
  - Wright, Edward (1627), The Description and Use of the Sphære. Deuided into Three Principall Parts. Whereof the First Intreateth especially of the Circles of the Vppermost Moueable Sphære, and of the Manifold Vses of euery one of them Seuerally. The Second Sheweth the Plentifull Vse of the Vppermost Sphære, and of the Circles thereof Joyntly. The Third Contayneth the Description of the Orbes whereof the Sphære of the Sunne and Moone haue been supposed to bee Made, with their Motions and Vses. By Edvvard Wright. The Contents of each Part are more particularly Set Downe in the Table, London: Printed by B[ernard] A[lsop] and T[homas] Fawcet for Iohn Tap, and are to bee sold at his shop at S. Magnus corner.
  - Wright, Edward (1969), The Description and Use of the Sphære. London 1613, Amsterdam; New York, N.Y.: Theatrum Orbis Terrarum; Da Capo Press.
- Wright, Edward (1614), A Short Treatise of Dialling Shewing, the Making of All Sorts of Sun-dials, Horizontal, Erect, Direct, Declining, Inclining, Reclining; vpon any Flat or Plaine Superficies, howsoeuer Placed, with Ruler and Compasse onely, without any Arithmeticall Calculation, London: Printed by Iohn Beale for William Welby.

=== Edited and translated ===
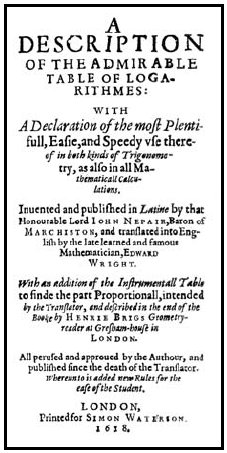
Title page of Admirable Table of Logarithmes (2nd ed., 1618)

- Stevin, Simon (1599), The Hauen-finding Art, or The VVay to Find any Hauen or Place at Sea, by the Latitude and Variation. Lately Published in the Dutch, French, and Latine Tongues, by Commandement of the Right Honourable Count Mauritz of Nassau, Lord High Admiral of the Vnited Prouinces of the Low Countries, Enioyning all Seamen that Take Charge of Ships vnder his Iurisdiction, to Make Diligent Obseruation, in all their Voyages, according to the Directions Prescribed herein: and now Translated into English, for the Common Benefite of the Seamen of England [by E. Wright] etc, translated by Wright, Edward, London: Imprinted by G. B[ishop] R. N[ewberry] and R. B[arker]. Reprinted as:
  - Stevin, Simon (1968), The Haven-finding Art, Amsterdam; New York, N.Y.: Theatrum Orbis Terrarum; Da Capo Press.
- Wright, Edward, ed. (1605), The Safegarde of Saylers, or Great Rutter. Contayning the Courses, Dystances, Deapths, Soundings, Flouds and Ebbes, with the Marks for the Entring of Sundry Harboroughs both of England, Fraunce, Spaine, Ireland. Flaunders, and the Soundes of Denmarke, with other Necessarie Rules of Common Nauigation. Translated out of Dutch ... by Robert Norman ... Newly corrected and augmented by E[dward] W[right], translated by Norman, Robert, London: By E. Allde for H. Astley.
- Napier, John (1616), A Description of the Admirable Table of Logarithmes: With a Declaration of the ... Use thereof. Invented and Published in Latin by ... L. John Nepair ... and Translated into English by ... Edward Wright. With an Addition of an Instrumentall Table to Finde the Part Proportionall, Invented by the Translator, and Described in the Ende of the Booke by Henry Brigs, etc, translated by Wright, E[dward], London: N. Okes. Later editions and reprints:
  - Napier, John (1618), A Description of the Admirable Table of Logarithmes: With a Declaration of the Most Plentifull, Easie and Speedy Use thereof in both kinds of Trigonometry, as also in all Mathematicall Calculations. Invented and Published inn Latine by that Honourable Lord John Nepair, Baron of Marchiston, and translated into English by the late learned and famous Mathematician, Edward Wright. With an Addition of the Instrumentall Table to finde the part of the Proportionall, intended by the Translator, and described in the end of the Booke by Henrie Brigs Geometry-reader at Gresham House in London. All Perused and Approved by the Authour, and Published since the Death of the Translator. Whereunto is added New Rules for the Ease of the Student, translated by Wright, E[dward] (2nd ed.), London: Printed for Simon Waterson.
  - Napier, John (1969), A Description of the Admirable Table of Logarithmes, London 1616, Amsterdam; New York, N.Y.: Theatrum Orbis Terrarum; Da Capo Press.
