= Lesley Cormack =

Canadian historian of science

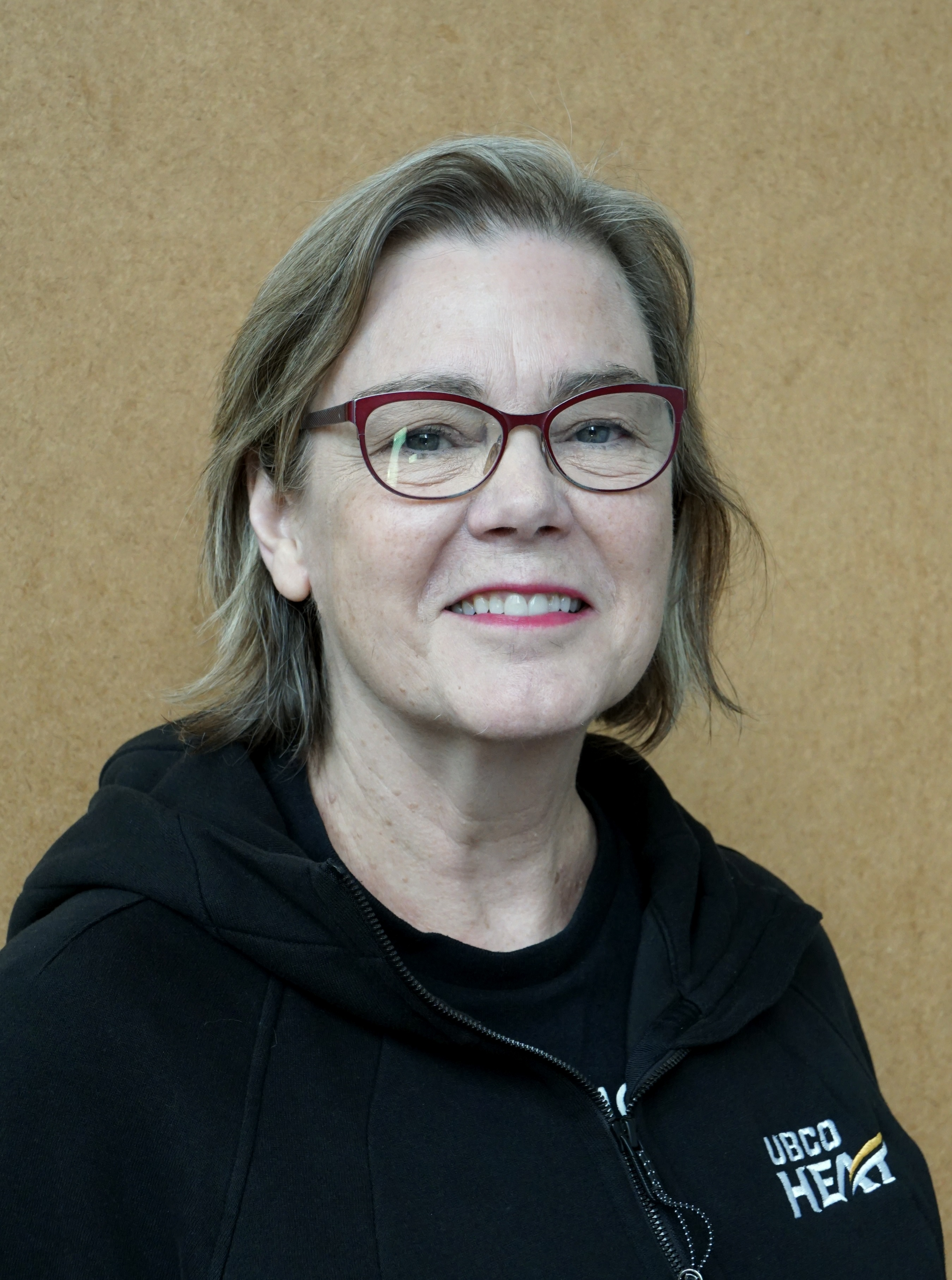
- Cormack in 2025
- Born: 1957 (age 68–69)
- Occupations: Deputy Vice-Chancellor and Principal of the University of British Columbia (Okanagan Campus)
- Awards: International Academy of the History of Science

Academic background
- Education: University of Calgary, BA; University of Toronto, MA, PhD

Lesley B. Cormack (born 1957) is a Canadian historian of science and academic administrator specializing in the history of mathematics and of geography. She is the Deputy Vice-Chancellor and Principal of the University of British Columbia's Okanagan Campus.

== Education and career ==
Cormack obtained her BA from the University of Calgary and her MA from the University of Toronto before earning her Ph.D. at the University of Toronto in 1988. She was a faculty member at the University of Alberta until 2007, when she moved to Simon Fraser University as Dean of the Faculty of Arts and Social Sciences. She returned to Alberta as Dean of the Faculty of Arts in 2010. While there, she increased the Indigenous student population by 100 percent. She moved to UBC Okanagan as Deputy Vice-Chancellor and Principal in 2020.

Cormack specializes in 16th century English geography and mathematics.

== Recognition ==
Cormack became a corresponding member of the International Academy of the History of Science in 2010, and a full member in 2015.

== Other Work ==
Cormack served as director of the Citadel Theatre for nine years.

== Books ==
Cormack is the author or editor of books including:

- Charting an Empire: Geography at the English Universities 1580-1620 (University of Chicago Press, 1997)
- Making Contact: Maps, Identity, and Travel (edited with Glenn Burger, Jonathan Hart, and Natalia Pylypiuk, University of Alberta Press, 2003)
- A History of Science in Society: From Philosophy to Utility (with Andrew Ede, 2 vols., Broadview Press, 2004; 2nd ed., University of Toronto Press, 2012; 3rd ed., 2016 and 2017)
- Mathematical Practitioners and the Transformation of Natural Knowledge in Early Modern Europe (edited with Stephen A. Walton and John A. Schuster, Springer, 2017)
