= Dallison (disambiguation) =

The Dallison was a British cyclecar.

Dallison may also refer to:

- Dallison, West Virginia, a community in the United States
- Dallison baronets, English Baronetcy created in 1644
- Charles Dallison (fl. 1648) officer during the English Civil War
- Tom Dallison (born 1996), English footballer

== See also ==
- Dalison
