= Dalison =

Dalison is a surname. Notable people with the surname include:

- The Dalison baronets
- Sir William Dalison (died 1559), English judge

== See also ==
- Dallison (disambiguation)
