= William Dalison (died 1546) =

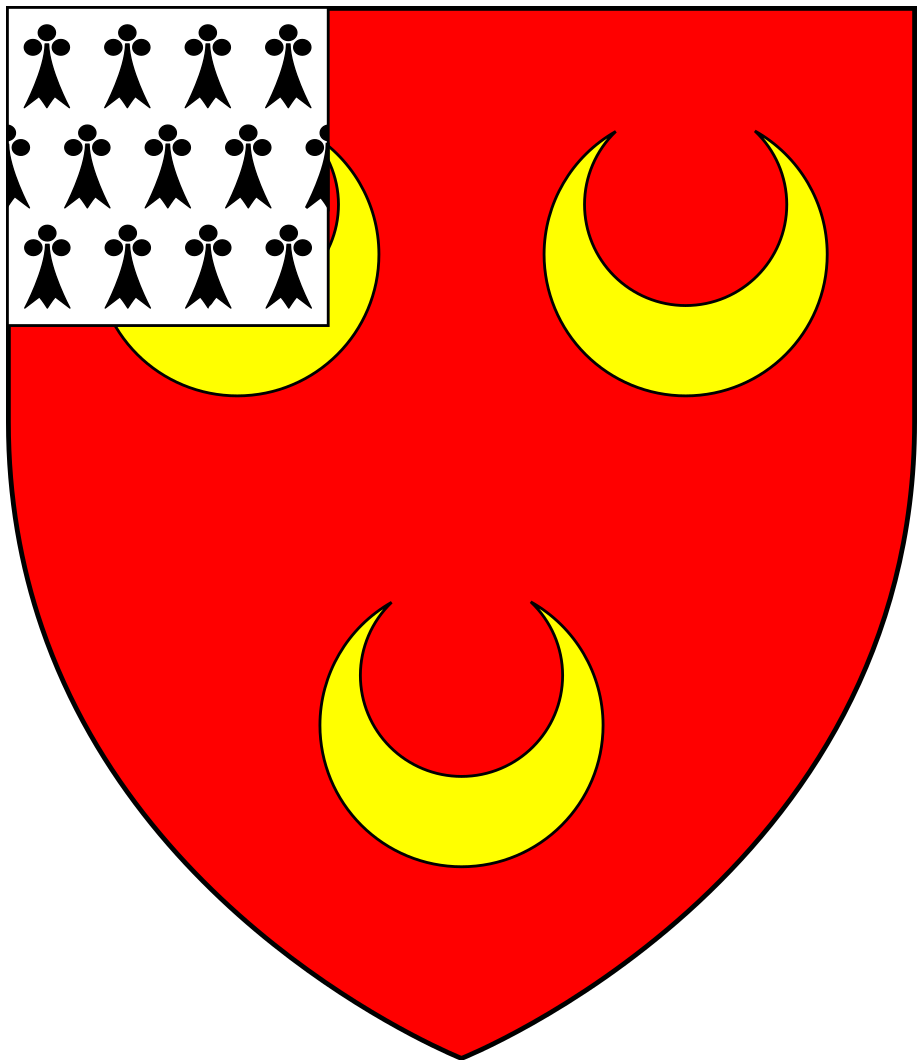
Arms of Dalison of Laughton

William Dalison (died 1546) of Laughton in the parish of Lindsey, Lincolnshire, was Sheriff of Lincolnshire in 1546 and Escheator of Lincolnshire.

== Career ==
He was closely associated with the influential Sir William Tyrwhitt of Scotter, whose children and widow he was entrusted with caring for. His brother was Dr. Roger Dalison, Chanter of Lincoln Cathedral.

== Marriage and children ==
He married Anne Wastneys, a daughter of George Wastneys of Haddon in Nottinghamshire, by whom he had at least two sons and one daughter:

- George Dalison (d.20 June 1549), eldest son and heir. He married Isabel Hopkinson and was the ancestor of the Dalison baronets, of Laughton (created in 1611 and 1624), namely Sir Roger Dalison, 1st Baronet (c. 1562 – 1620), Lieutenant-General of the Ordnance, and his son Sir Thomas Dalison, 1st Baronet (died 1645) who had to reapply for a new creation of the baronetcy as a clerical error was discovered in the register of baronets.
- Sir William Dalison (died 1559), a judge who served as a Member of Parliament for Lincolnshire in 1553. As he instructed in his will, he was buried in Lincoln Cathedral under a "tomb which bears a picture of him wearing his robes of justice".
- Anne Dalison, wife of Edward Tyrwhitt, son of Philip Tyrwhitt (c.1510-1558), of Barton-upon-Humber, Lincolnshire, a Member of Parliament for Lincolnshire in 1554.

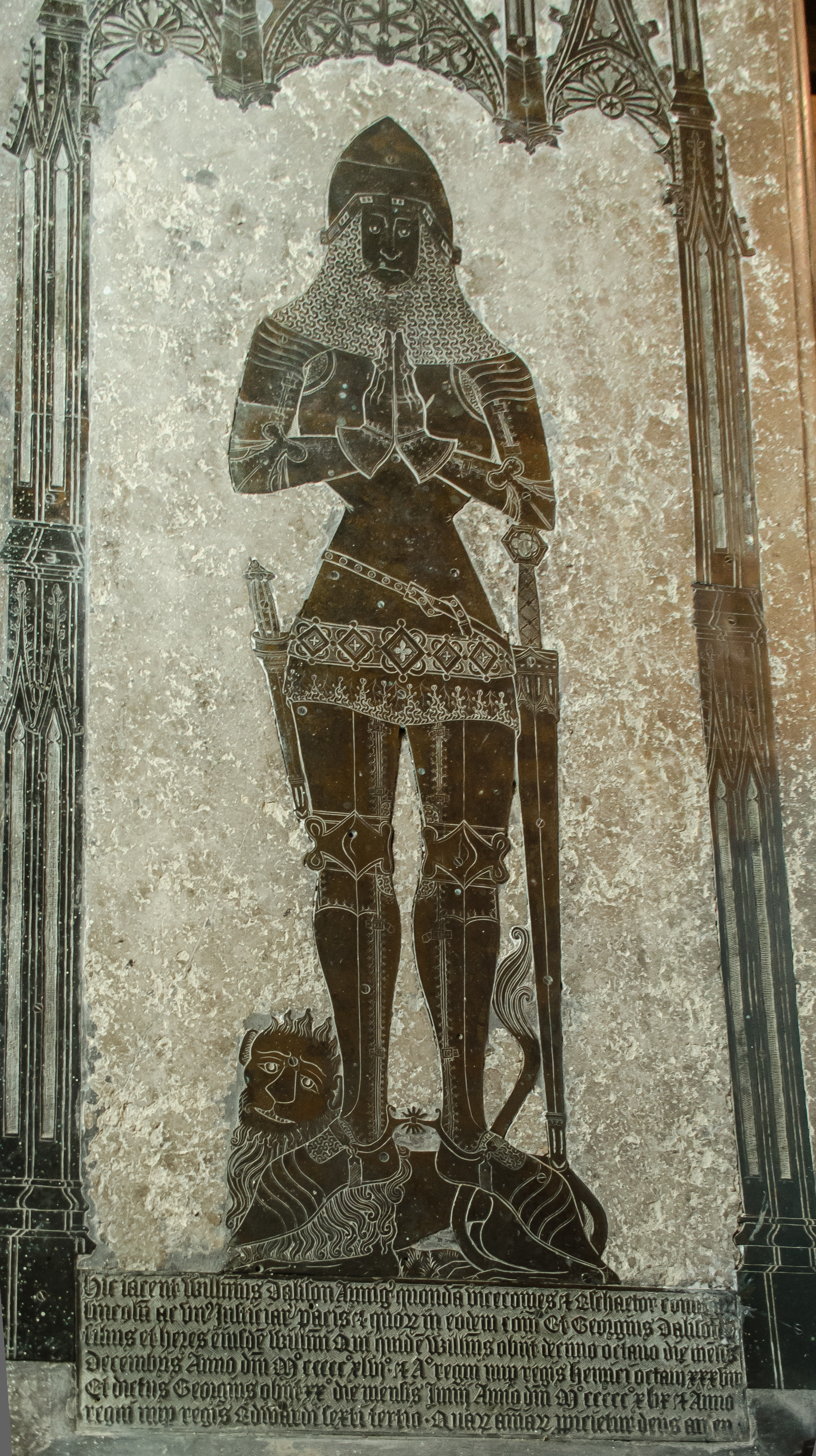
Monumental brass in All Saints' church, Laughton, Lincolnshire

== Monument ==
His re-used Gothic monument made circa 1405, in All Saints' Church, Laughton, Lincolnshire, is of a knight wearing the style of armour worn at the Battle of Agincourt (1415), with Gothic-style canopy, serving as ledger stone for the remains of William Dalison (died 1546), with inscription for Dalison made in imitation Gothic script below. William Dalison lived well into the Renaissance age in England when the taste for the Gothic style had long passed.

The Latin inscription is as follows:

Hic jacent Will(el)mus Dalison Armig(er) quonda(m) vicecomes & eschaetor comit(atus) Lincoln ac un(um) justiciar(es) pacis ..... in eodem com(itatu) et Georgius Dalison filius et heres eiusde(m) Will (el)m(i) qui quide(m) Will(el)m(u)s obiit decimo octavo die me(n)sis decembris Anno d(o)m(ini) M^{o}CCCCCXLVI^{o} & a(nn)o regni .... regis Henrici Octavi XXXVII et dictus Georgius obiit XX^{o} die mensis junii anno d(o)m(ini) M^{o}CCCCCXLIX et anno regni .... regis Edwardi Sexti tertio. Quar(um) anima(rum) p(ro)picietur deus amen.

Which may be translated as:

"Here lie William Dalison, Esquire, at one time Sheriff and Escheator of the County of Lincoln and one of the Justices of the Peace ... in the same county; and George Dalison, son and heir of the same William; which William died on the 18th day of the month of December in the year of our lord the 1,000th five hundredth and 46th and in the year of the reign of ..... King Henry the Eighth the 37th; and the said George died on the 20th day of the month of June in the year of our lord the 1,000th five hundredth and 49th and in the year of the reign of ..... King Edward the Sixth, the third. Of the souls of whom may God look upon favourably, amen".
