= Laughton, West Lindsey =

Village and a civil parish in the West Lindsey district of Lincolnshire, England

Coordinates: 53.465485°N 0.722464°W

Laughton
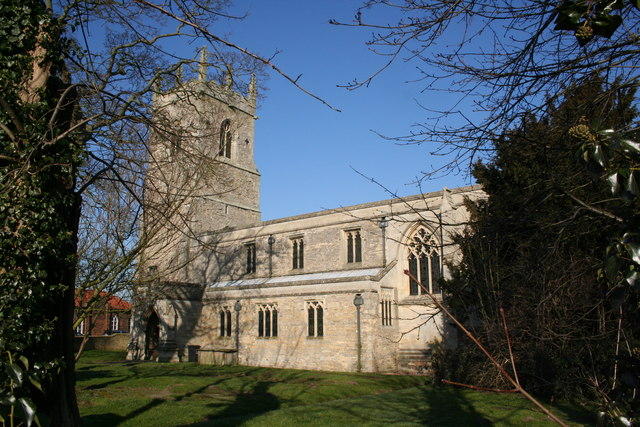
- Church of All Saints, Laughton

- Location within Lincolnshire
- Population: 410 (2011)
- OS grid reference: SK849972
  - London: 150 mi (240 km) S
- District: West Lindsey
- Shire county: Lincolnshire
- Region: East Midlands
- Country: England
- Sovereign state: United Kingdom
- Post town: Gainsborough
- Postcode district: DN21
- Police: Lincolnshire
- Fire: Lincolnshire
- Ambulance: East Midlands
- UK Parliament: Gainsborough

Laughton is a village and a civil parish in the West Lindsey district of Lincolnshire, England. The population of the civil parish at the 2011 census was 410. It is situated approximately 6 miles (10 km) north from the town of Gainsborough

Nearby is Laughton Forest, mostly privately owned but leased to the Forestry Commission, which was created in the 20th century on a sandy heath.

== History ==
Laughton is listed in the 1086 Domesday Book, as "Lacestone" and "Lastone", with 29 households.

A village school was founded in 1566 by a bequest of Dr Roger Dalison, an uncle of Sir Roger Dalison, and was established as a free grammar school in 1578. It was located in the Church Stile. A new school-house was built in 1821, funded by Isabella Ingram-Seymour-Conway, Marchioness of Hertford. The Ingram family were the local landowners, giving their name to the Ingram Arms public house.

== All Saints Church ==
The parish church is built of limestone, dedicated to All Saints, and is a Grade I listed building dating from the 12th century. It was restored and the chancel rebuilt in 1894 by Bodley and Garner.

=== Gothic brass ===
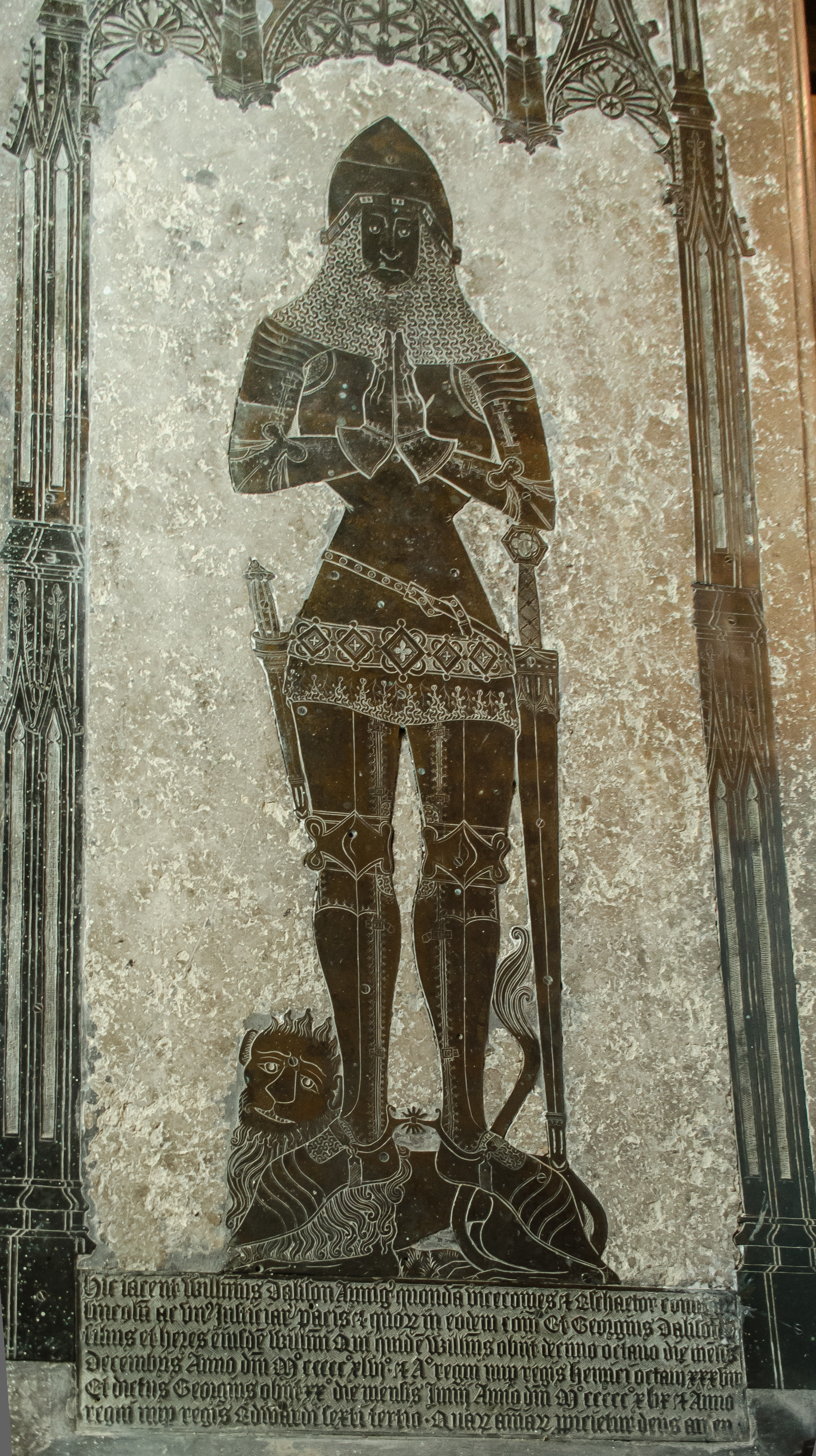
All Saints' church, Laughton, anachronistic re-used monumental brass made circa 1405, of a knight wearing the style of armour worn at the Battle of Agincourt (1415), with Gothic-style canopy, serving as ledger stone for the remains of William Dalison (died 1546), who lived well into the Renaissance age when the taste for the Gothic style had long passed

In the south aisle is a full-length monumental brass, made in about 1405, showing a knight wearing the style of armour worn at the Battle of Agincourt (1415), with Gothic-style canopy, reset in 1549 with new imitation Gothic-style inscription, to serve as the ledger stone for William Dalison (died 1546) of Laughton, Sheriff of Lincolnshire in 1546 and Escheator of Lincolnshire. It is of a style and design similar to at least three surviving brasses namely those of:

- Sir Peter Courtenay (d.1405), KG, in Exeter Cathedral.
- Sir Maurice Russell (d.1416), Saint Peter's Church, Dyrham, Gloucestershire.
- Thomas Berkeley, 5th Baron Berkeley (d.1417), Church of St Mary the Virgin, Wotton-under-Edge, Gloucestershire.

== Wildsworth Church ==
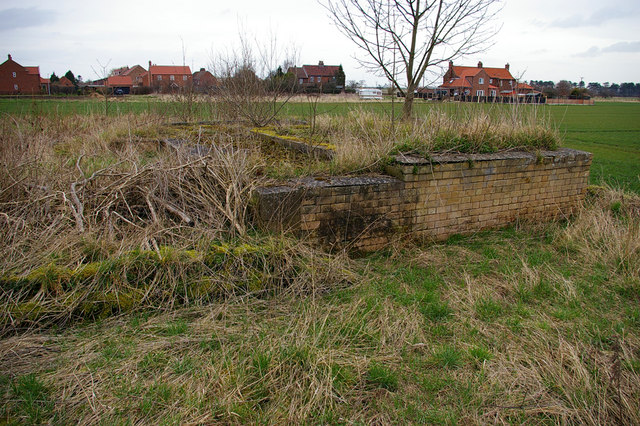
Ruins of Wildsworth Church

The village of Wildsworth is 2.5 miles (4.0 km) to the west on the bank of the River Trent. It had a yellow-brick church, dedicated to St John the Divine, built in 1838 by Charles Biggs. It was declared redundant by the Diocese of Lincoln in 1982 and demolished two years later. It is still listed on the National Heritage List for England as a Grade II listed building, where it is described as disused.
