= Battle of the Berlengas (1591) =

1591 naval battle between England and Spain

Coordinates: 39°25′38″N 9°31′11″W

Battle of Berlengas Islands
- Part of the Anglo-Spanish War (1585–1604)
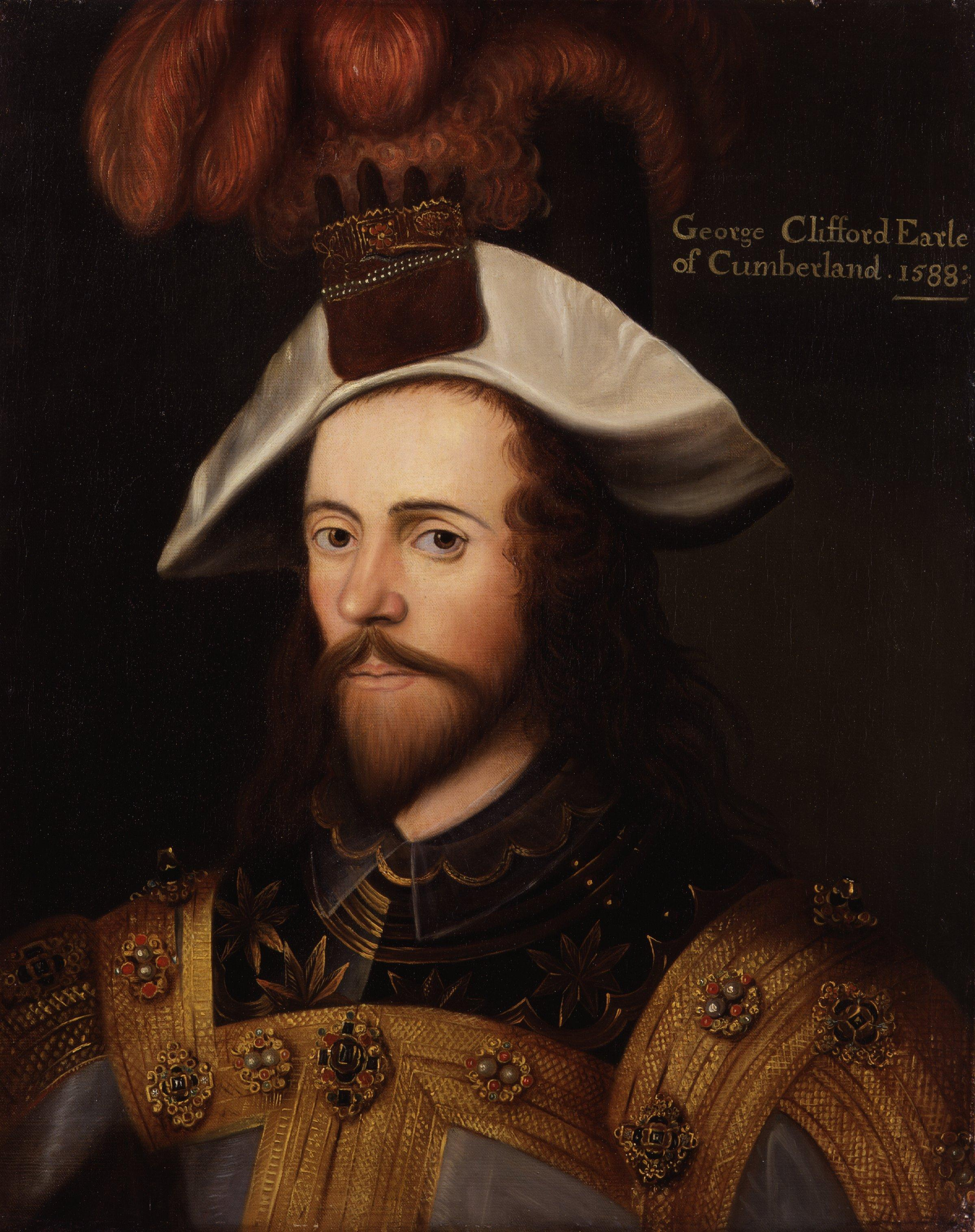
- George Clifford, 3rd Earl of Cumberland, after Nicholas Hilliard, c. 1590.
Date	15 July 1591
Location	Off the Berlengas Islands, Atlantic Ocean (present-day Portugal)
Result	Spanish victory

Belligerents
England	Spain

Commanders and leaders
Earl of Cumberland; William Monson (POW)	Francisco Coloma

Strength
5 warships	5 galleys

Casualties and losses
1 warship captured, 2 prizes recovered, "Captain and principal men slain", 150+ prisoners	2 killed

The Battle of Berlengas Islands was a naval battle which took place off the Portuguese coast on 15 July 1591, during the war between Elizabeth I of England and Philip II of Spain. It was fought between an English privateer squadron under George Clifford, 3rd Earl of Cumberland, who had set out his fortunes by large-scale privateering, and a squadron of 5 Spanish galleys commanded by Francisco Coloma tasked with patrolling the Portuguese coast against privateers. While anchored off the Berlengas, the English ships were surprised by the Spanish galleys, which succeeded in taking one English ship and rescuing two prizes.

== Expedition ==
Having undertaken naval expeditions to the coasts of Spain in 1587, 1588, and 1589, in the spring of 1591, the Earl of Cumberland sailed to Cape St. Vincent in a new privateering campaign with one royal ship, the 600-ton galleon Garland, and four of his own, the 260-ton Sampson, the Golden Noble, Allegarta, and the small pinnace Discovery. Sir William Monson of Stuart, later Admiral of the Royal Navy, was his second in command. Off the Spanish coast they took a pair of Dutch ships sailing from Lisbon with spices. Though the Dutch Republic was allied with England against the Spanish Crown, the ships taken by the English squadron had the goods of Portuguese merchants on board.

So greatly we were abused by the nation of Holland, who, though they were the first that engaged us in the war with Spain, yet still maintained their own trade into those ports, and supplied the Spaniards with ammunition, victuals, shipping and intelligences against us.

— Sir William Monson's naval tracts, p. 179

The English squadron took further prizes: one ship loaded with wine and two with sugar, which were sent back to England. One of these ships had a leak in the hull and was forced to cast off. Its boarding crew was saved on the shore. The two other vessels met contrary winds and, lacking of provisions, were obliged to enter the port of A Coruña, where they were immediately taken. The English squadron, meanwhile, sailed to the Berlengas islands, a group of small islands off the Portuguese coast near the city of Peniche. There, the Earl of Cumberland ordered Monson to escort the Dutch prizes to England with Captain Peter Baily's Golden Noble. During the night, however, Cumberland's Garland and the other warships fell separated from Monson and the prizes.

== Battle ==
The Golden Noble was discovered by a squadron of five Spanish galleys under Francisco Coloma, General of the Armada de Guarda Costa (Coast-guard armada). Archduke Albert, Spanish Viceroy of Portugal, noticed the presence on those waters of English privateers and had sent Coloma's squadron to sail the coast of Algarve till Cape St. Vincent and join forces with Alonso de Bazán's galleons. Taking advantage of the calm, the Spanish galleys rowed up, engaged and took the English ships after a bloody fight. Captain Peter Baily and the principal men were killed in the fight. Coloma captured the 14-gun, 150-man man-of-war Golden Noble and recovered the Dutch prizes, a caravel and a zabre, at the slight cost of two men killed. Cumberland heard the artillery of Monson's ship in distance, but he was unable to come in relief because of contrary winds.

== Aftermath ==
After the action, Cumberland wrote to Archduke Albert requesting him that the English prisoners should be humanely treated or he would retaliate the injuries which they might suffer with "double severity" upon the Spaniards. Monson, who was among the prisoners, was carried to Portugal and imprisoned two years at Cascais and Lisbon, together with 6 other officers, being the sailors and soldiers provided with new clothing and freed. Monson spent several months as a galley slave in the Leiva galley together with 100 other English captives. Two weeks after the encounter, a much larger English fleet under Lord Thomas Howard, dispatched to the Azores to capture the annual Spanish treasure convoy sailing from the Americas, was put to the flight at the Battle of Flores. The English galleon Revenge was dismasted and captured by the Spanish and Portuguese ships after a protracted action, but later the prize foundered in a storm.
