= Azores Voyage of 1589 =

- Part of the Anglo–Spanish War
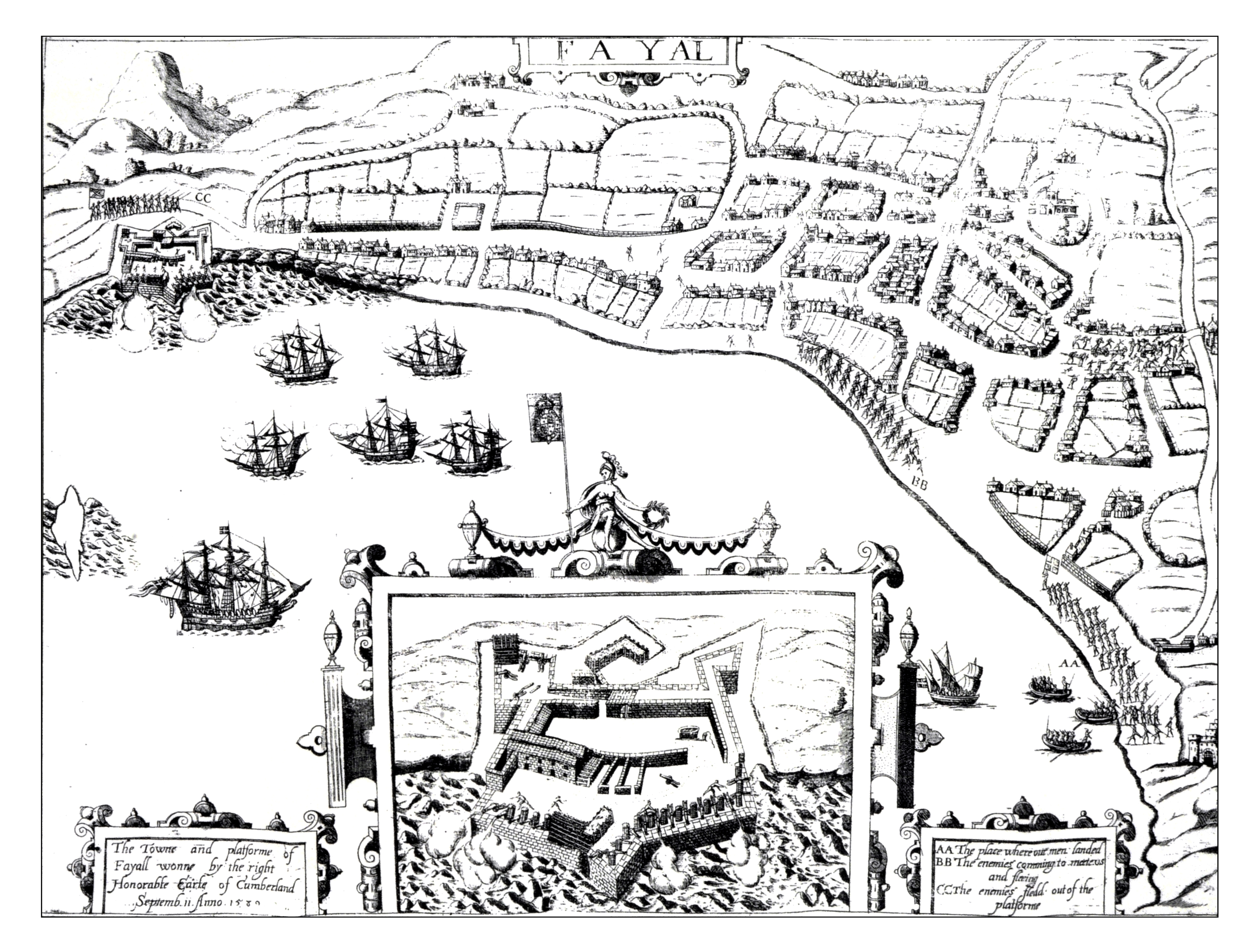
- Print of Cumberland' successful attack at Faial island in 1589
Date	August – September 1589
Location	Atlantic, present day Azores
Result	English victory

Belligerents
Spain: Portugal under Philip of Spain	England

Commanders and leaders
Diego Gomez; Gaspar de Lemos Faria	Earl of Cumberland; William Monson

Strength
Various Spanish & Portuguese ships, fortifications	6 warships 300 soldiers

Casualties and losses
1 galleon sunk 13 ships captured, burnt, sunk, or wrecked 400 killed, wounded, or captured	40 casualties 100 to disease & thirst

The Azores Voyage of 1589, also known as Cumberland's Third Voyage, was a series of conflicts in the Azores islands between August and September 1589 by an English military joint stock expedition led by George Clifford, 3rd Earl of Cumberland, during the Anglo–Spanish War. All the islands were attacked either for provisions or the attainment of Spanish and Portuguese prizes. A number of Portuguese and Spanish ships were captured and also included a battle at Faial, which resulted in the capture of the fort and the main town, which was subsequently sacked and burned. The English were able to return home unmolested with a total of thirteen prizes – the expedition was a success and with a good profit for the investors although many people died to disease and storms.

The expedition was also a scientific one in that the eminent mathematician and cartographer Edward Wright carried out navigational studies that, for the first time, explained the mathematical basis of the Mercator projection.

== Background ==
By virtue of the Iberian Union, the Anglo-Portuguese Treaty of 1373 was in abeyance, and as the Anglo–Spanish War was still ongoing, Portuguese shipping was a fair target for the Royal Navy. As a result, the Azores and the Cape Verde islands were also subject to attack – this was partly due to the influx of Spanish traders to the islands as a result of the Union but also a place for the Spanish treasure galleons to replenish for victuals before the final leg of their journey to Spain.

With the English Armada being organised at the same time, a breakaway expedition to the Azores was also authorised by Queen Elizabeth I. George Clifford, 3rd Earl of Cumberland, was put in command of a private venture of which he set up a number of ships which included the Victory, Meg, Margaret, a caravel and two other support vessels. William Monson, a 20 year old at the time, was second in command as captain of the Margaret. Cumberland set off on 18 June 1589 from Plymouth and headed to the coast of Spain.

== Expedition ==
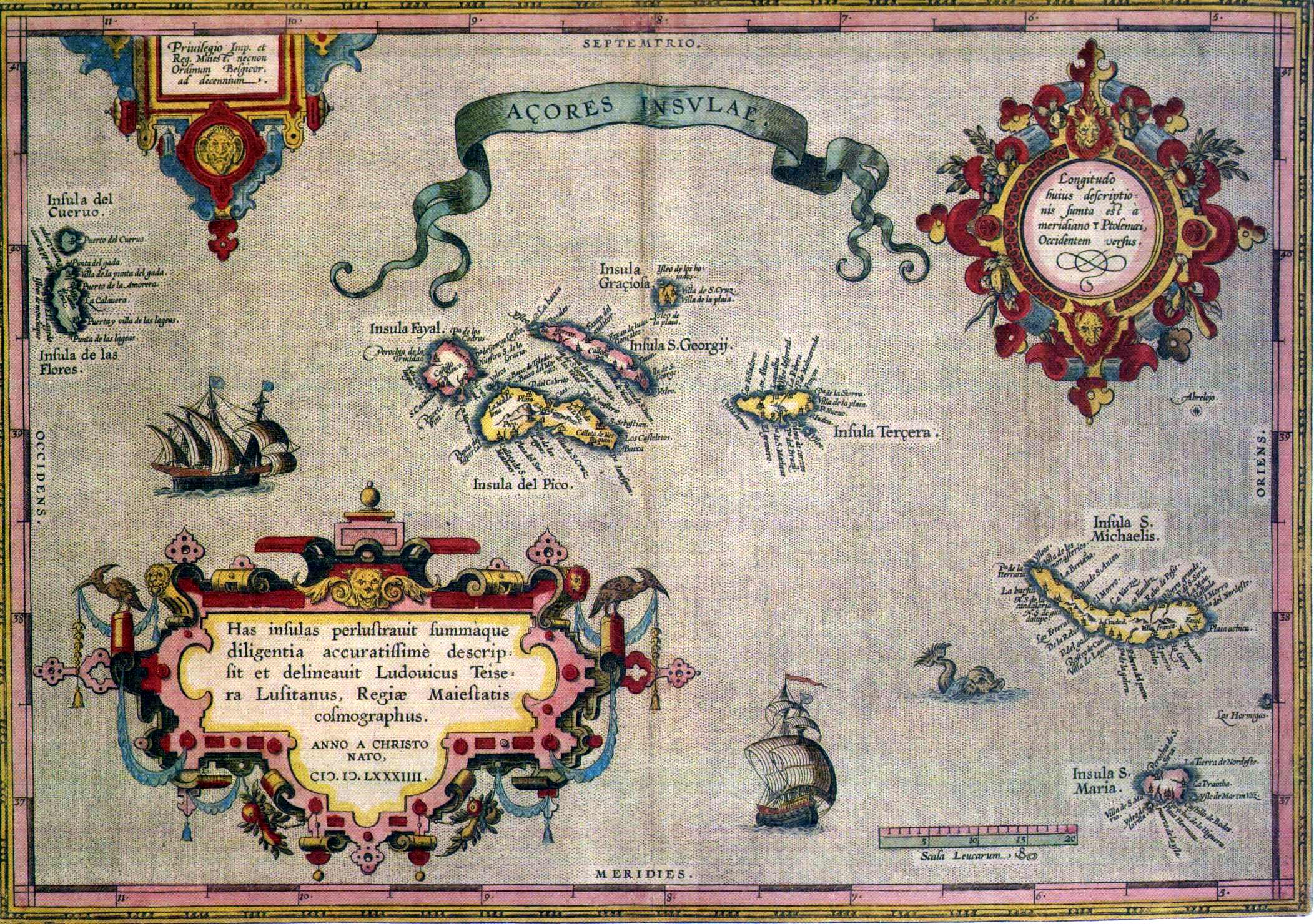
Map of the Azores from 1585.

On his approach to the Spanish coast Cumberland's ships seized a number of French Catholic League and Flemish vessels with Newfoundland fish stock to the value of £4,500 which were bound to a rich merchant in Lisbon. Cumberland sailed on and reached the Azores islands on 1 August and then positioned themselves where they awaited the passage of the galleons from Spanish America. Within a few days Cumberland then decided to attack the group of islands for supplies and any ships that were there.

=== São Miguel & Flores ===
Cumberland's first call came at São Miguel. He flew a Spanish flag to fool the Iberian forces there and proceeded to the capital Ponta Delgada, where he surprised and captured four small Portuguese carracks just offshore. These were laden with olive oil and 30 tuns of Madeira wine, besides woollen cloth, silk, and taffeta.

On August 14 the fleet put in at the island of Flores for water and food, but while there they received intelligence of certain Spanish and Portuguese ships that were at anchor at Terceira Island. After some quick repairs and a gathering of victuals unmolested, the English at once set sail for that island.

=== Terceira ===
Upon his arrival Cumberland sailed into Angra Bay, sighted, trapped, and then immediately launched an attack on the Spanish and Portuguese ships. He was assisted by another English ship, the Barke of Lyme, which was one of Sir Walter Raleigh's vessels commanded by Captain Marksburie which happened to be in those parts. An attempt on a large heavily armed Portuguese carrack failed which then managed to escape. Another, a Portuguese carrack, however, which had come from Malacca and India, was captured when the English sailors boarded her. Overall seven ships were captured and these included the Spanish ships Nuestra Señora del Loreto, San Juan, El Espiritu Sanctu, and the San Cristobal coming from Spanish America. The riches included silk, gold, silver, and porcelain. From two Portuguese ships Cumberland took cargoes of elephants teeth, grain, coconuts, and Guinean goat skins. Whilst the battle was raging English captives on the island managed to escape, stole a small boat, and were subsequently rescued by the Margaret. After the capture and destruction of the vessels the English ships gathered some water further round the island and set sail to Faial Island.

=== Faial ===
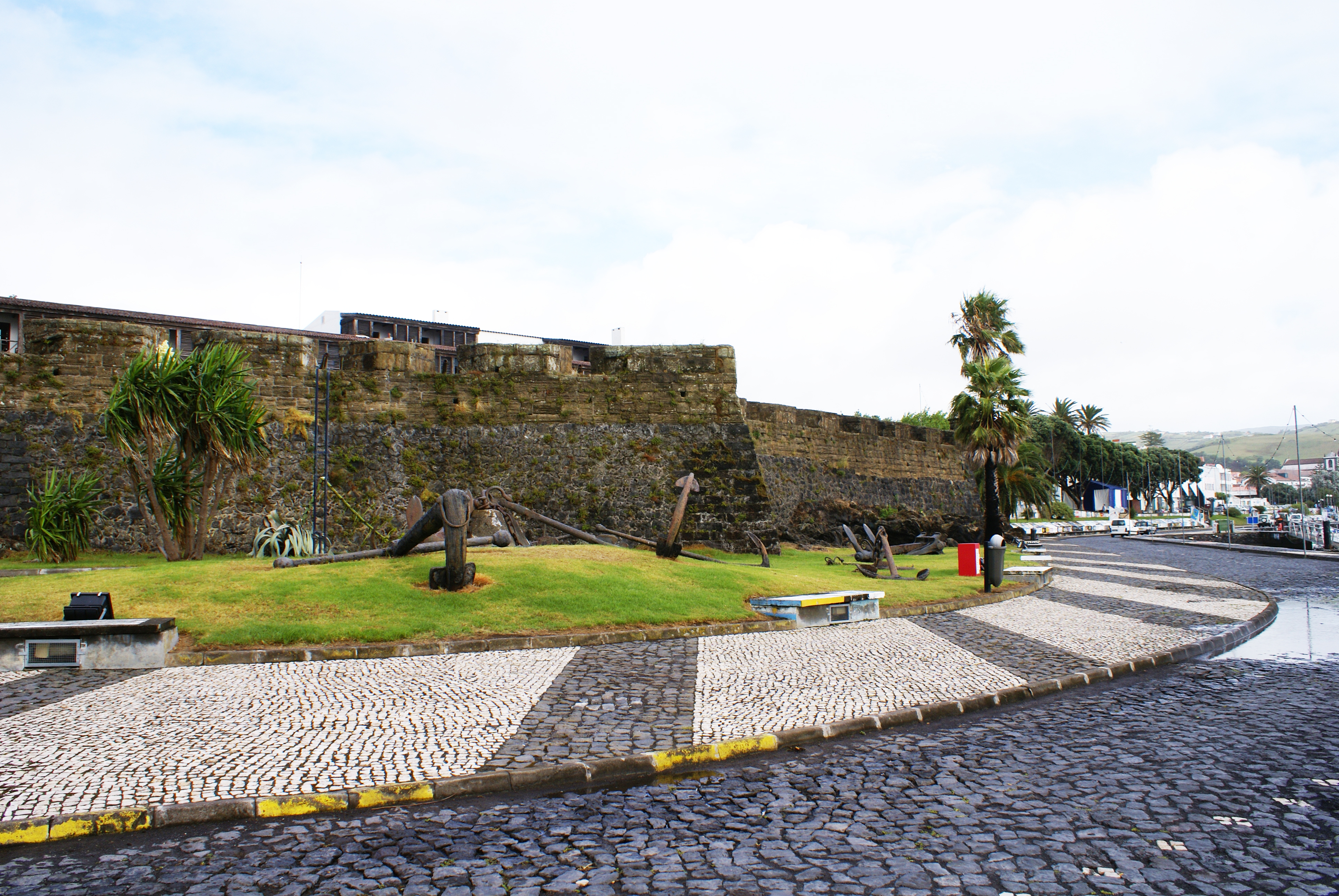
Forte de Santa Cruz present day in which Cumberland took by assault.

On 6 September 1589 the English fleet arrived off Horta harbour in Faial. The Forte de Santa Cruz which dominated the harbour was approached under a truce and a surrender was demanded, but the Governor of the place refused saying that their "oath and allegiance lay to King Philip of Spain". After this was done 300 English troops descended on the beach of Lagoa, launched an attack on the port then swiftly attacked the village, sacked the buildings and forced the residents to flee into the interior. For four days they plundered the possessions of the inhabitants, in addition to demanding a ransom of 2000 ducats. This eventually was paid by the authorities, mostly with the silver of the churches whose buildings were not spared by the destructive fury of the Englishmen. When they attacked the fort, the building was defended by less than fifty Spanish and Portuguese soldiers and was quickly overwhelmed after some resistance. The Governor Diego Gomez was however given a safe conduct by Cumberland personally. Fifty-eight pieces of iron ordnance were also captured and taken away and the platform on which they had stood was demolished, and the buildings within the fort were burned down.

After gathering booty the fleet sailed to the nearby island of Graciosa whereby an attack was then made. The Portuguese villagers however immediately produced a flag of truce and some sixty tons of wine, and fresh food was brought out to the fleet, after which they then set sail from the island. By this time however a Spanish treasure fleet had just entered Terceira and Cumberland not realising had missed them whilst being at Graciosa.

=== Santa Maria ===
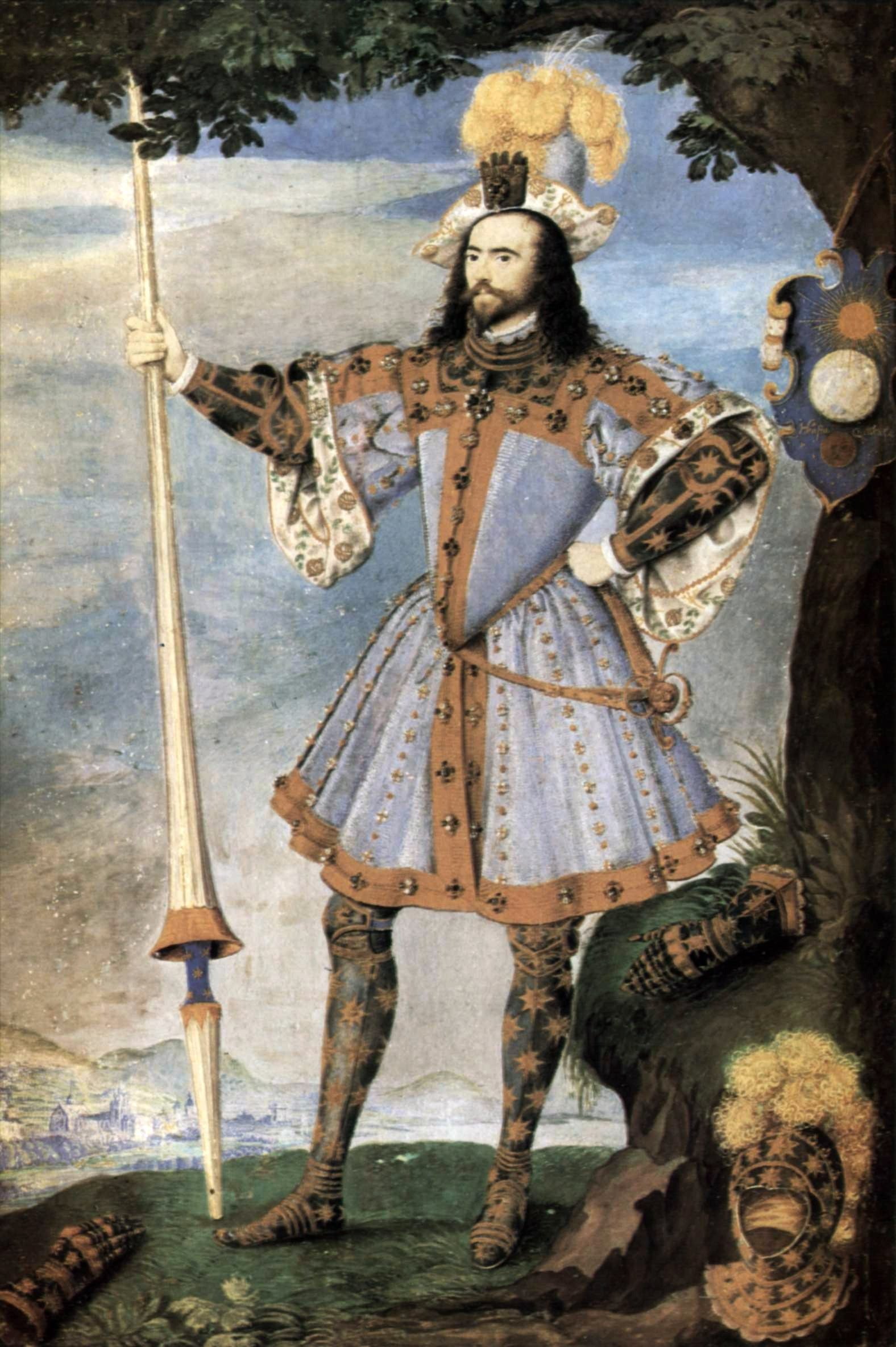
George Clifford, Earl of Cumberland by Nicholas Hilliard

The next prize was taken off Santa Maria Island, a small Portuguese carrack having come from Portuguese Brazil laden with sugar, but this was not secured without a severe struggle, in which the English lost two men and had sixteen others wounded. Cumberland sent the Margaret which was unfit to go along further to accompany the captured vessel which was sent back to England, with many of the hurt and wounded on board. Soon after Cumberland planned an attack upon the fortifications of the island which was undertaken at Captain Lister's advice.

After they disembarked in the Vila do Porto, they climbed the rocky cliffs of Conceição and were met by gunfire from the defenders, under the command of Captain-Major Brás Soares de Albergaria and his adjutant André de Sousa (as recorded by Father Manoel Corvelo, who also an active participant; extorting the defenders while holding an image of the Virgin Mary in his hands). Throwing rocks from the cliffs, the Portuguese inflicted casualties, disorder, and confusion, eventually causing the English to desist, retreating and leaving behind small boats, muskets, and cutlasses. Cumberland was himself wounded in the side, head, and legs, and Captain Lister was shot in the shoulder.

Cumberland's men left to lick their wounds but not to be disheartened by this failure they then waited off Santa Maria in their ships. Within a few days they sighted an approaching vessel which was set upon and quickly captured – a Portuguese vessel of 110 tons bringing from Brazil 410 chests of sugar and a large quantity of Brazil wood. Then acting on information obtained on board her, set off in pursuit of the companion vessel the Spanish nao Nuestra Señora de Guia. Two days later Victory caught sight of her, overhauled the ship battered her and then boarded her supported by the Meg. After a short bitter fight the galleon surrendered. The Captain was an Italian who had adventured 25,000 ducats in the expedition. The English explored their loot. Cumberland was surprised by what he saw: the vessel was loaded with hides, cochineal, and some chests of sugar, also with china dishes, plate, and silver.

The remaining vessels now made for the coast of Spain. The fleet started for home, in expectation of being back before Christmas with their rich prizes.

== Cartographic voyage ==
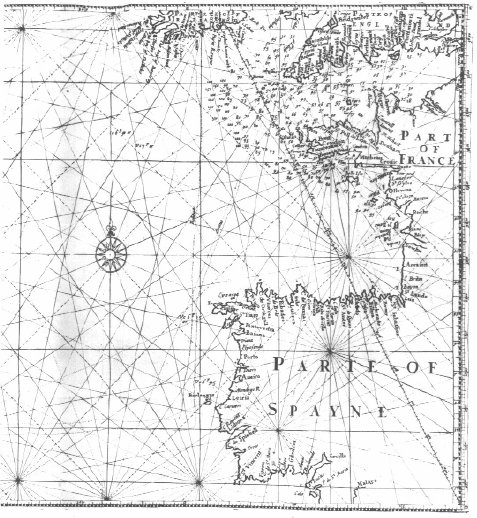
Edward Wright's map for sailing to the Azores.

The expedition's route was the subject of the first map to be prepared by Edward Wright, a prominent English mathematician and cartographer.

In 1599, ten years after the expedition, Wright created and published the first world map produced in England and the first to use the Mercator projection since Gerardus Mercator's original 1569 map. Together this was published in Certaine Errors in 1599.

== Aftermath ==
With the general success of the expedition they returned to England, but on the way the fleet was struck by severe storms. Hunger and disease also took its toll on the fleet as well. Many died of thirst on the return voyage, as water had run out and the efficiency of gathering supplies dogged the whole expedition. After a brief stop in Ireland for supplies due to strong winds driving them there, news soon reached them that an English ship, the Margaret, with the richest prize Nuestra Señora de Guia, had been shipwrecked off the coast of Cornwall near Mounts Bay. Captain Lister and all the crew save six had been drowned, but the vast majority of goods had been saved and kept for them by Sir Francis Godolphin. Meanwhile, the vessels struggled toward Plymouth in the face of a heavy storm. They had to give up the idea of landing at the place from which they had set sail, and returned to Falmouth on 27 December instead. Cumberland had taken thirteen prizes of various sizes, with a varying degree of profit. On reaching London, there was news from his family: his eldest son had died, but a daughter had been born.

On the Azores the fortresses were repaired and were reinforced, but they had insufficient artillery, so the military regiment could do little to prevent ships from off-loading their forces. This was the case in August 1597 when Walter Raleigh and his men attacked, sacked and set the village of Horta aflame, during the campaigns of Robert Devereux, 2nd Earl of Essex during the Islands Voyage.

The explorer John Davis joined and took part in the expedition.

== Bibliography ==
- Andrews, Kenneth (1984). Trade, Plunder and Settlement: Maritime Enterprise and the Genesis of the British Empire, 1480-1630. Cambridge University Press. ISBN 978-0521276986.
- Andrews, Kenneth (1964). Elizabethan Privateering 1583-1603. Cambridge: Cambridge University Press. pp. 180–81. ISBN 9780521040327.
- Ballantyne & Eastland, Iain & Jonathan (2011). HMS Victory: First-Rate 1765 Seaforth Historic Ships Series Warships of the Royal Navy. Seaforth Publishing. ISBN 9781783409396.
- Bicheno, Hugh (2012). Elizabeth's Sea Dogs: How England's Mariners Became the Scourge of the Seas. Conway. ISBN 978-1844861743.
- Childs, David (2014). Pirate Nation: Elizabeth I and her Royal Sea Rovers. Seaforth Publishing. ISBN 9781848321908.
- Clowes, William Laird (1996). The Royal Navy: A History from the Earliest Times to 1900 Volume 1 Sir. Chatham Pub. ISBN 9781861760104.
- Dean, James Seay (2013). Tropics Bound: Elizabeth's Seadogs on the Spanish Main. The History Press. ISBN 9780752496689.
- Figueiredo, Nélia Maria Coutinho (1996). As Ilhas do Infante: a Ilha de Santa Maria [The islands of the Infante: the island of Santa Maria] (in Portuguese). Angra do Heroísmo (Azores), Portugal: Secretaria Regional da Educação e Cultura/Direcção Regional da Educação. ISBN 972-8366-00-0.
- MacCaffrey, Wallace T (1994). Elizabeth I: War and Politics, 1588-1603. Princeton University Press. ISBN 9780691036519.
- Palmer, Veronica (1999). Who's Who in Shakespeare's England: Over 700 Concise Biographies of Shakespeare's Contemporaries. Palgrave Macmillan. ISBN 9780312220860.
- Parsons, E.J.S; Morris, W.F (1939). "Edward Wright and His Work". Imago Mundi. 3: 61–71. doi:10.1080/03085693908591862. JSTOR 1149920.
