= Francis Fane (Royalist) =

English royalist (1611–1681)

Sir Francis Fane of Fulbeck KB FRS (c. 1611 – c. 1681) supported the Royalist cause during the English Civil War.

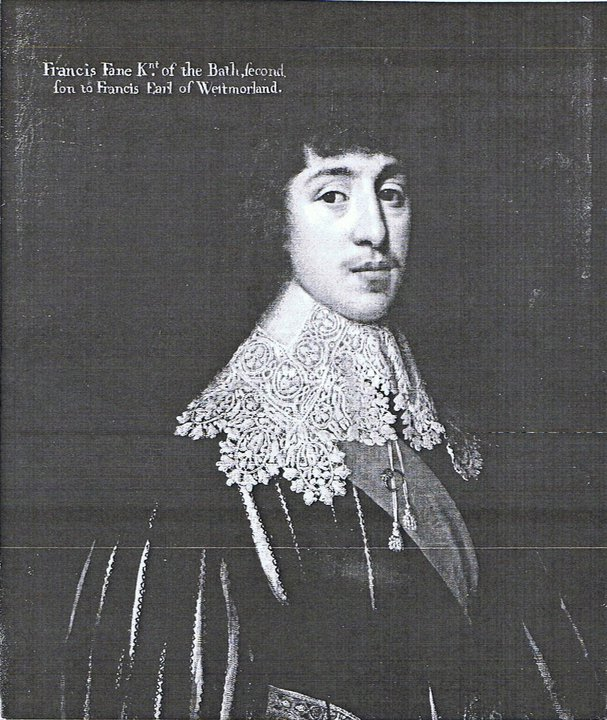
Fane of Fulbeck, by Cornelius Jonson, (black & white reproduction).

== Biography ==
Fane was the third, but second surviving, son of Francis Fane, 1st Earl of Westmorland.

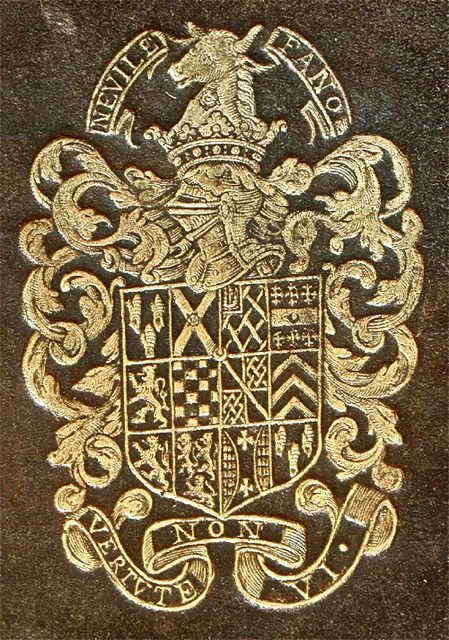
Arms of Sir Francis Fane (c.1611-1681?), K.B., on a book.

Fane was made a Knight of the Bath at the coronation of Charles I. During the English Civil War he was appointed by the Duke of Newcastle to be governor of Doncaster for the King, and afterwards of Lincoln Castle.

Lincoln was besieged by Edward, Earl of Manchester on 3 May 1644. An attempt to break the siege was made by George, Lord Goring on 5 May, but he found the Parliamentary forces too strong and retreated. The next night the Lincoln Castle (a key defensive structure) was stormed with the use of scaling ladders. Sir Francis Fane, Sir Charles Dallison, and 100 other officers and gentlemen, and 800 soldiers were taken prisoner.

He obtained some reputation as a dramatic writer, having left, besides some poems, three dramatic pieces. He was elected a Fellow of the Royal Society in May 1663 (and expelled in 1682).

Fane was seated at Fulbeck, in Lincolnshire, and at Aston in Yorkshire, where he resided the latter part of his life.

== Family ==
Fane's siblings included, Mildmay Fane, 2nd Earl of Westmorland; Rachel, Countess of Bath; and Colonel the Hon. George Fane.

In 1636, Fane married Elizabeth (widow of John, 4th Lord Darcy and 3rd Baron Darcy of Aston), born c. 1606 at Firbeck, Yorkshire, the eldest daughter of William West of com. Ebor. ('the county of York') and his wife Catherine Darcy, of Dartford, Kent, the daughter of Sir Edward Darcy. Elizabeth was co-heir with her brother, John West, Esq. She died in 1669, aged 62 or 63, leaving her four sons and six daughters by Sir Francis Fane:

1. Francis, who became a dramatist
2. William, who died unmarried
3. Henry
4. Edward, who married Jane, third daughter of James Stanier, of London, merchant, still living 1679. Edward died in 1679, aged 37, and was buried at St Martin-in-the-Fields, London
5. Mary, married to a man by the surname of Marshall, of Fisherton, Lincolnshire
6. Rachael
7. Elizabeth married Thomas Wodhull, of Mollington in Oxfordshire, Esq. and died 2 May 1678
8. Catherine
9. Grace, wife of William Grove, of Shropshire, Esq.
10. Jane
