= William Monson (Royal Navy officer) =

Royal Navy officer and politician

Vice-Admiral Sir William Monson
- Born: 1569
- Died: 1643 (aged 73–74); London, England
- Relatives: Son of Sir John Monson of South Carlton
- Military career
- Allegiance: England
- Branch: Royal Navy
- Service years: 1585–1636
- Rank: Vice-Admiral
- Commands: Admiral of the Narrow Seas
- Conflicts: Spanish Armada; Azores Voyage of 1589; Battle of Flores (1592); Battle of the Berlengas (1591); Capture of Cádiz; Battle of Sesimbra Bay

Vice-Admiral Sir William Monson (1569 – February 1643) was a Royal Navy officer and politician who sat in the House of Commons of England in 1601.

== Life ==
Monson was the third son of Sir John Monson of South Carlton, Lincolnshire. He matriculated at Balliol College, Oxford, on 2 May 1581 at the age of 14.

== Career ==
Monson ran away to sea in 1585, being then according to his own account sixteen. His first services were in a privateer in an action with a Spanish ship in the Bay of Biscay, of which he gives an account in his Naval Tracts. In the Armada year he served as Lieutenant of the "Charles," a small ship of the Queen's. There being at that time no regular naval service, Monson is next found serving with the adventurous Earl of Cumberland (1558–1605), whom he followed as a young twenty old as second in command of the Azores Voyage of 1589. His success there led him to join Cumberland's other ventures in 1591 and 1593. The voyage in 1592 however was the most spectacular and led to the capture of the rich carrack Madre de Deus. After this, in another venture Monson was taken prisoner by the Spaniards in a recaptured prize after an engagement off Berlengas Islands, and was for a time detained at Lisbon in captivity. He was awarded MA at Oxford on 9 July 1594 and was also a student of Gray's Inn in 1594. His cruises must have brought him some profit, for in 1595 he was able to marry. The Earl offended him by showing favour to another follower, and Monson turned elsewhere. In the expedition to Cádiz in 1596, he commanded the Due Repulse and was also knighted there. From this time until the conclusion of the war with Spain he was in constant employment. In 1602 he commanded the last squadron fitted out in the reign of Queen Elizabeth by defeating a Spanish and Portuguese fleet at Sesimbra Bay near Lisbon capturing a rich large carrack. He also took prisoner the same man who captured Monson at Berlengas nearly ten years earlier.

Monson was elected Member of Parliament for Malmesbury in 1601. In 1604 he was appointed Admiral of the Narrow Seas, the equivalent of the Channel Fleet of modern times. Like several Jacobean courtiers and officials, Mansell received gifts of money from Spanish diplomats between 1604 and 1625. In 1613, the diplomat Sir John Digby was surprised to discover records of these payments. According to the historian Garrett Mattingly, in exchange for his Spanish pension he willingly provided the Spanish Ambassador with information on the latest strength of the English Navy, or the movements of Dutch and English ships in the Narrow Seas.

In 1614 he was sent to the coasts of Scotland and Ireland to repress the pirates who then swarmed on the coast. Monson claimed to have extirpated these pests, but it is certain that they were numerous a generation later. After 1614 he saw no further active service till 1635. In 1635 he went to sea as vice-admiral of the fleet fitted out by King Charles I with the first ship money. He spent the last years of his life in writing his Tracts.

Monson died in February 1643 and was buried at St Martin in the Fields.

== Legacy ==
His claim to be remembered is not based on his services as a naval officer, though they were undoubtedly honourable, but on his Tracts. These treatises consist in part of historical narratives, and in part of argumentative proposals for the reform of abuses, or the development of the naval resources of the country. They form by far the best account by a contemporary of the naval life and transactions of the reign of Elizabeth I and the beginning of the reign of King James. Monson takes care to do himself full justice, but he is not unfair to his contemporaries. His style is thoroughly modern, and has hardly a trace of the poetry of the Elizabethans. He was the first naval officer in the modern sense of the word, a gentleman by birth and education who was trained to the sea, and not simply a soldier put in to fight, with a sailing master to handle the ship for him, or a tarpaulin who was a sailor only. The one authority for the life of Sir William Monson is his own Tracts, but a very good account of him is included by Southey in his Lives of the Admirals, vol. v. The Tracts were first printed in the third volume of Churchill's Voyages, but they have been edited for the Navy Record Society by Mr Oppenheim.

== Family ==
Monson's elder brother, Sir Thomas Monson (1564–1641), was one of James I's favourites, and was made a baronet in 1611. He held a position of trust at the Tower of London, a circumstance which led to his arrest as one of the participators in the murder of Sir Thomas Overbury. He was, however, soon released. His eldest son was Sir John Monson, Bart. (1600–1683), a member of parliament under Charles I, and another son was Sir William Monson (c. 1607–1678), who was created an Irish peer as Viscount Monson of Castlemaine in 1628. Having been a member of the court which tried Charles I the viscount was deprived of his honours and was sentenced to imprisonment for life in 1661. Sir John Monson's descendant, another Sir John Monson, Bart. (1693–1748), was created Baron Monson in 1728. His youngest son was George Monson (1730–1776), who served with the English troops in India from 1758 to 1763. The baron's eldest son was John, the 2nd baron (1727–1774), whose son William Monson (1760–1807) served in the Mahratta War under General Lake. William's only son William John (1796–1862) became 6th Baron Monson in succession to his cousin Frederick John, the 5th baron, in October 1841. His son William John, the 7th baron (1829–1898), was created Viscount Oxenbridge in 1886. When he died without sons in 1898 the viscounty became extinct, but the barony descended to his brother Debonnaire John (1830–1900), whose son Augustus Debonnaire John (b. 1868) became 9th Baron Monson in 1900. Another of Viscount Oxenbridge's brothers was Sir Edmund John Monson, Bart. (b. 1834), who, after filling many other diplomatic appointments, was British ambassador in Paris from 1896 to 1904.

Parliament of England
| Preceded by Sir Henry Knyvet; Thomas Estcourt | Member of Parliament for Malmesbury; 1601; With: Sidney Montagu | Succeeded by Sir Roger Dallyson; Sir Thomas Dallyson |
