= Fort of Santa Cruz (Horta) =

- Forte de Santa Cruz
- Faial, Azores in Portugal
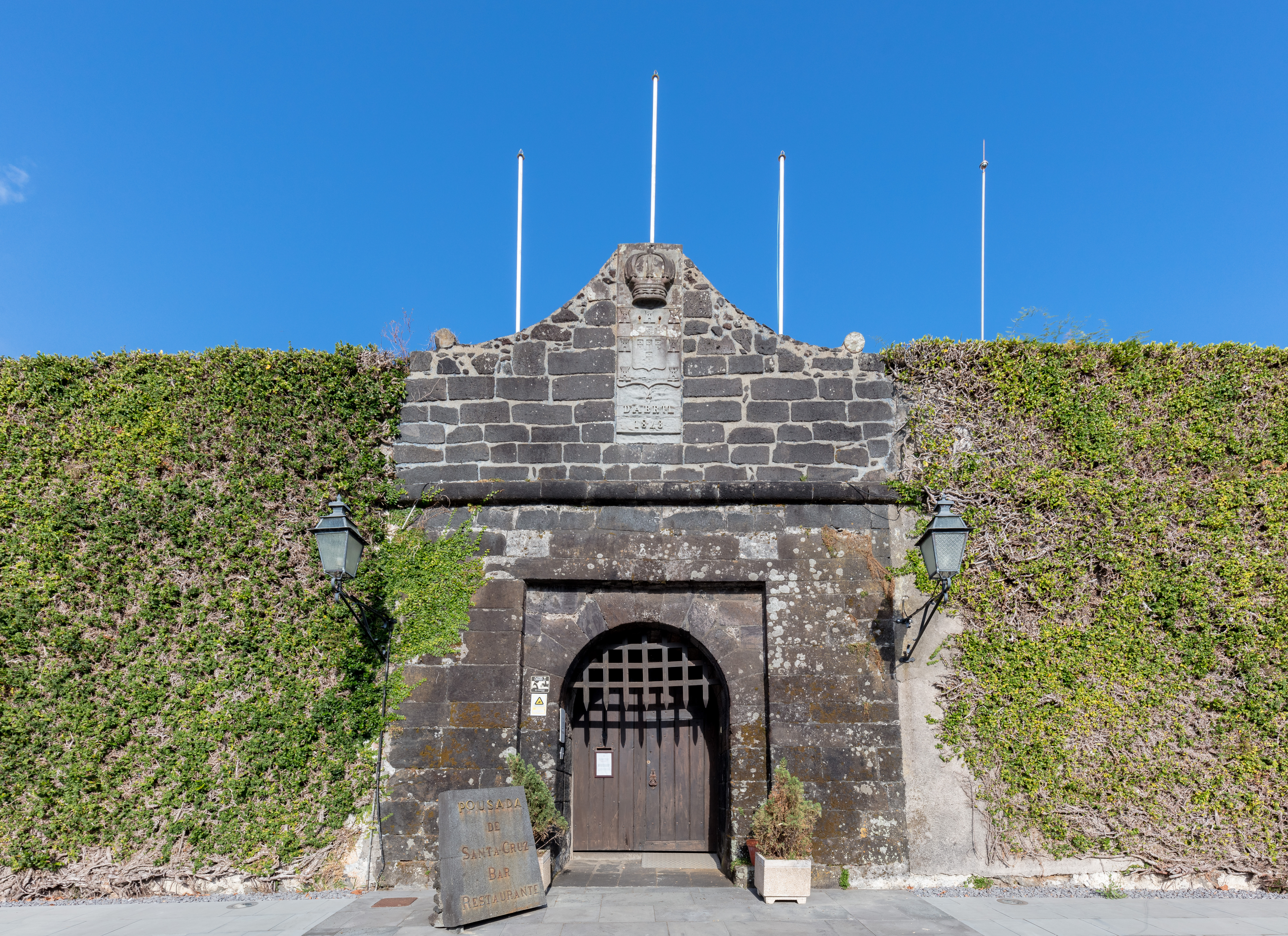
- The main walls of the Fort of Santa Cruz, as seen from Rua Vasco da Gama(Regional E.R.1-1ª)

Site information
- Type: Fort
- Owner: Câmara Municipal de Horta
- Operator: Pousadas de Portugal
- Open to the public: Private

Location
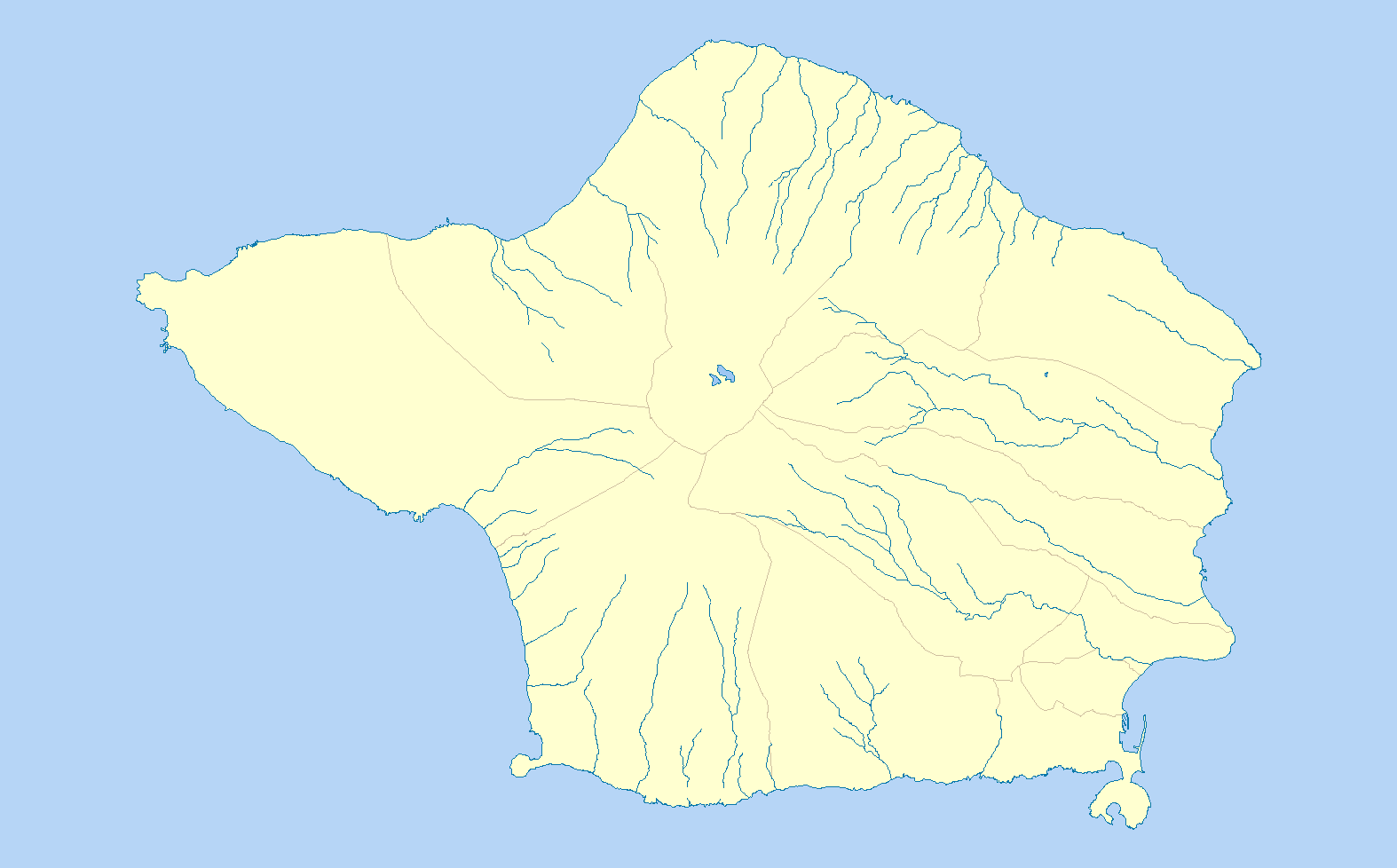
- Location of the Santa Cruz Fort within the municipality of Horta, island of Faial
- Coordinates: 38°31′53.75″N 28°37′34.66″W

Site history
- Built: c. 1567
- Materials: Basalt, Tuff

Fort of Santa Cruz (Portuguese: Forte de Santa Cruz da Horta or Castelo da Santa Cruz), is a 16th-century fortification located in the civil parish of Angústias, municipality of Horta, on the island of Faial in the Portuguese Azores. Occasionally referred to as the Castelo de Santa Cruz by locals, it is situated in the historic centre of the city, on the edge of Horta Bay. It was constructed to work in conjunction with the Fort of Bom Jesus (Portuguese: Forte do Bom Jesus) at the mouth of the Ribeira da Conceição and Fort of Greta (Portuguese: Forte da Greta) along the coast of the extinct spatter cone Monte da Guia, to defend the entrance to the harbour and southern access to the Bay.

== History ==
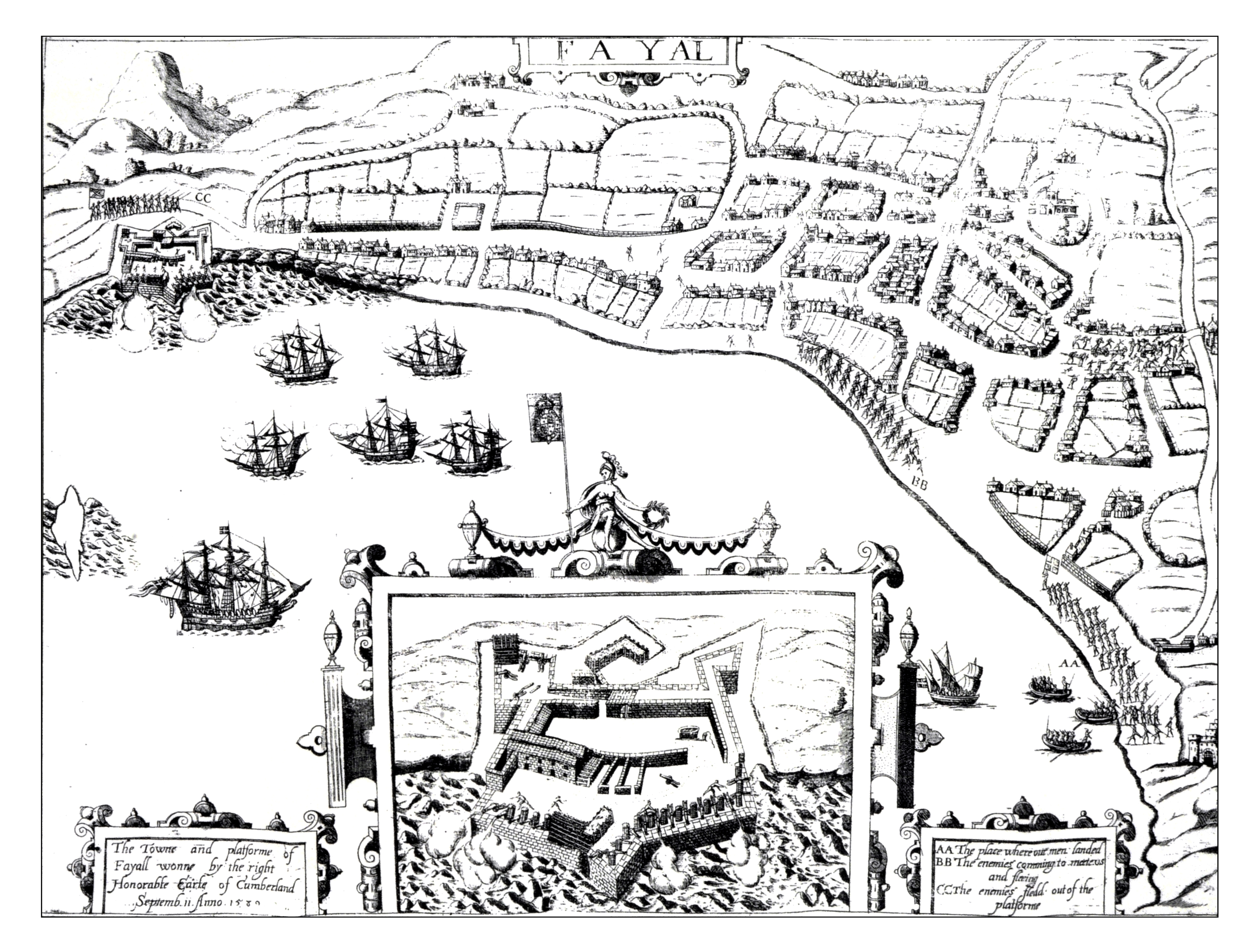
"Fayal", a map showing the assault by the Duke of Cumberland (September 1589)

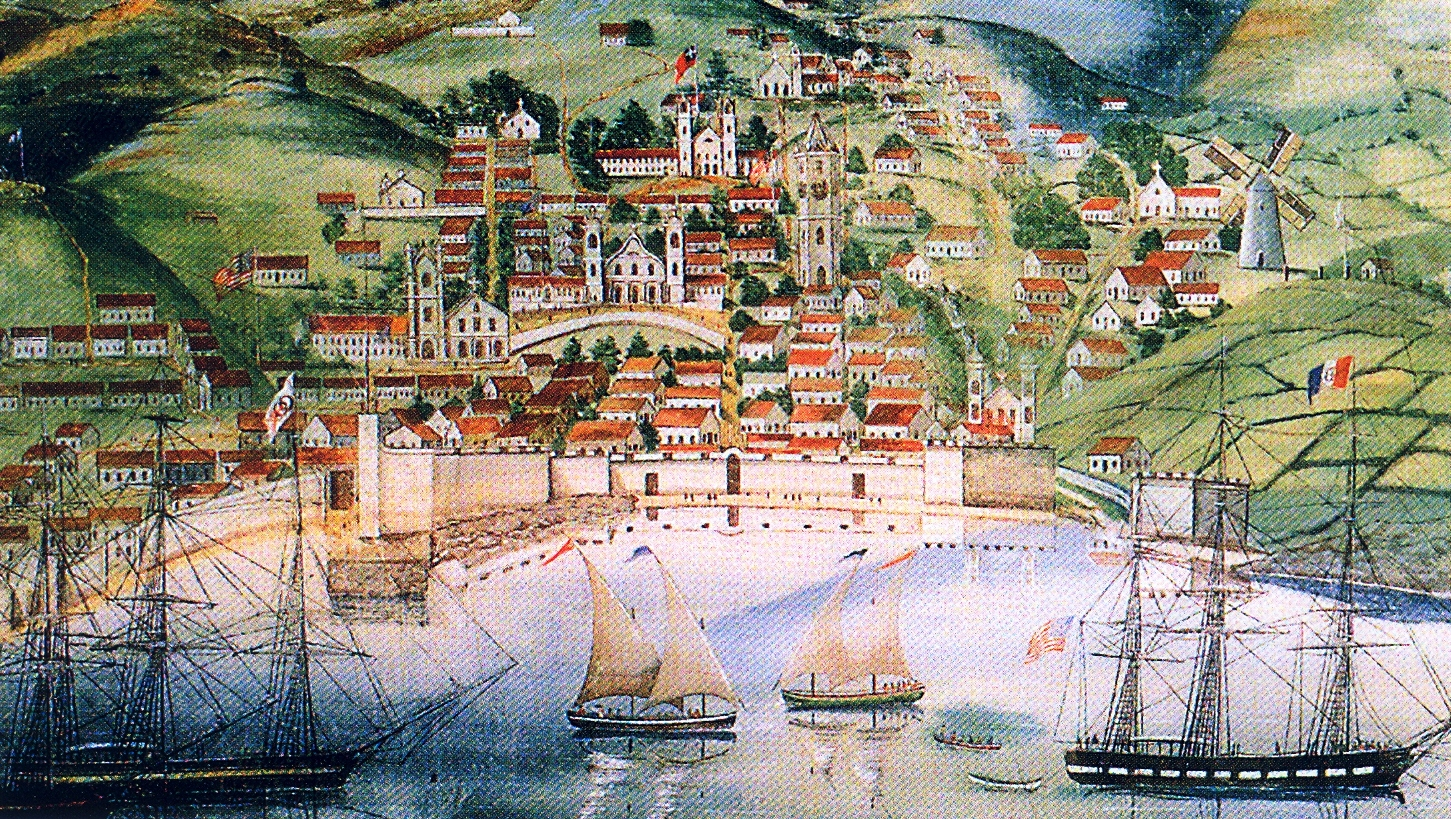
A vista of the village of Horta (1842) showing the Bay defenses from the Fort of Santa Cruz to the Fort of Bom Jesus

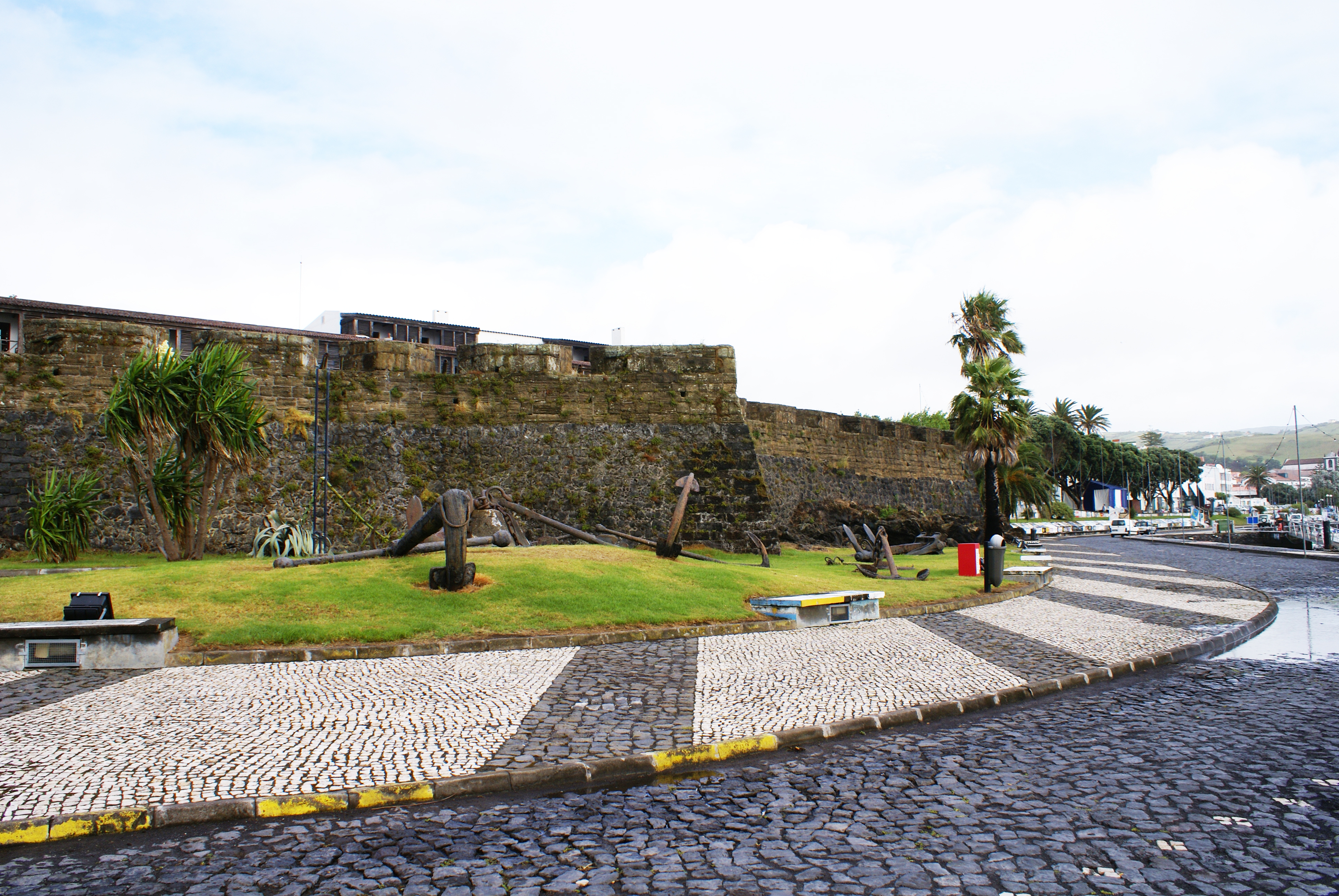
The old seawalls of the fort, over time the fort has become part of the city

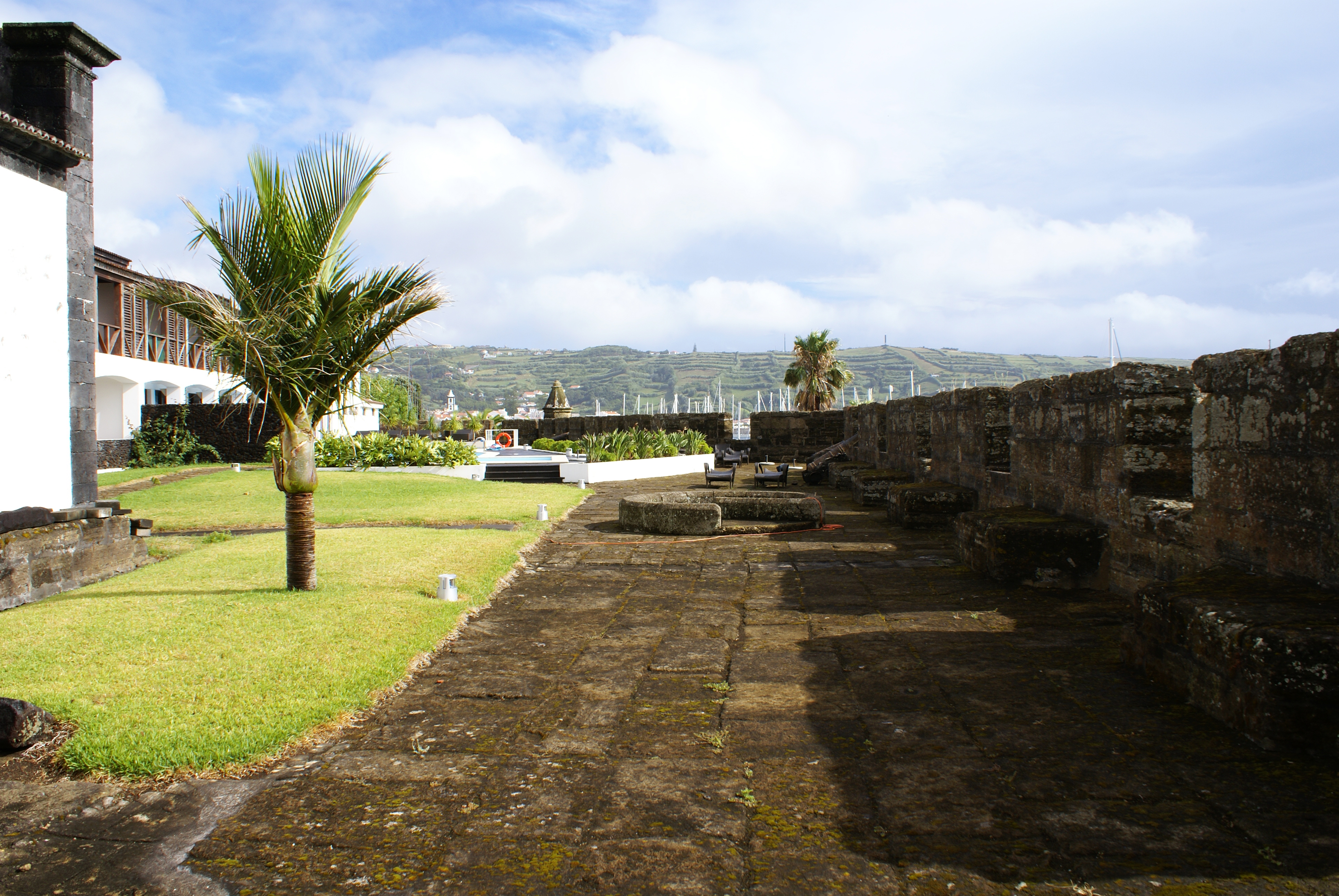
Interior "courtyard" of the fort, once the martially grounds for the garrison

A study of the defensive conditions of the archipelago of the Azores, from pirates and privateers, attracted by the riches of the ships returning from Africa, India and Brazil, began in the middle of the 16th century by the military engineer Bartolomeu Ferraz. In his plan to the Portuguese Crown, Ferraz warned of the vulnerability of the islands of São Miguel, Terceira, São Jorge, Faial and Pico to pirate attacks or Protestant military forces. His plan justified the need to improve the security conditions at the ports and protect ships in Azorean waters:

"... because the three islands import a lot...and [for they] principally aid the carracks from India and [because] the French against reason, justly or injustly, take everything they can..."

During the reigns of Kings John III (1521–1557) and Sebastian (1568–1578), along with new regiments sent to the region, military architect Tommaso Benedetto was sent to reformulate the defenses (in 1567), during the regency of Cardinal Henry, King of Portugal. Benedetto understood that with a determined maritime force, the defense of the islands could be concentrated at ports and anchorages, by the local population and under the responsibility of the municipal authorities.

Primitively referred to as the Castelo de Santo António nu lugar da Cruz (because of the chapel located within its walls), the fort that would be known as Santa Cruz, was planned-out during Benedetto's visit in 1567, which also included the stationing of an artillery company on its grounds. Its construction was unlikely to have taken long: in fact, a Royal order for the director of Public Works, Luís Gonçalves, obligated him to visit the islands of Faial and São Jorge to get those projects completed.

Subordinate to the administrative authority of Terceira, Horta was ever fearful of attacks; the Battle of Salga (1581), led the military to strengthen the fortifications along the coast of Faial, repairing existing defences and constructing new battlements. During the Iberian Union crisis (1583), Santa Cruz defended Horta from a Spanish armada under the command of Pedro de Toledo, who disembarked in the nearby village of Pasteleiro. After marching from their beachhead to the village of Horta, the Spaniards attacked and defeated the regiment, eventually capturing and executing the Captain-major António Guedes de Sousa at the doors of the fort. The Spanish garrison was recalled to Terceira, when the local population complained that they could not support nor lodge the occupying armada. Ironically, this was a regrettable decision: on 6 September 1589 an English fleet, under the command of George Clifford, 3rd Earl of Cumberland as part of his Azores Voyage of 1589, arrived in Horta harbour, captured a carrack from India and seven other ships at the port, and attacked the village, sacking the buildings and forcing the residents to flee into the interior. When they attacked the fort, the building was defended by seven soldiers, the vicar and captains Gaspar Dutra, Tomás Porrás, Domingos Fernandes and João Francisco. The privateers took all the artillery pieces that they encountered on the island (except two that they did not find in Porto Pim) and burned down buildings within the fort. Repaired, but with insufficient artillery, the military regiment could do little but prevent ships from off-loading their forces. This was the case in August 1597, when Walter Raleigh and his men attacked, sacked and set the village of Horta aflame, during the campaigns of Robert Devereux, 2nd Earl of Essex.

After 1650, and until the second half of the 20th century, the fort served to house and garrison a small number of troops from the Horta garrison.

At the time John Bass Dabney arrived in 1805, the fort extended into the harbour, and alongside, the fishermen (when not out with their boats) used to gather on the small quay to gossip. As U.S. Counsel General to the Western Islands, Dabney was there and participated covertly in the events leading to the destruction of the U.S. privateer General Armstrong in the Bay of Horta by British ships during the War of 1812. Dabney suggested to its captain that the Armstrong should hover within the guns of the "castle", intent on coercing the Portuguese in the fort to break neutrality and fire on the British in defense. Regardless, after an initial assault by 14 British longboats, the British ship H.M.S. Carnation fired on, then her men set flame to the Armstrong as its crew abandoned ship to their enemy. During the course of the battles houses were damaged in Horta, and people killed or injured. The legal implications of the events extended for 36 years: the ships owners, upon not obtaining reparations for the sinking of the Armstrong turned to Portugal, who they believed, that the military in the Fort of Santa Cruz should have defended, since the ship was in a supposedly safe, neutral harbour. Considering the age and condition of the fortress at this time, it was highly unlikely and futile.

During the Portuguese Liberal Revolution (1821), the residents of Faial were hesitant to rebel (given the reign of terror on Terceira, where Governor Stockler annulled changes, demanded an oath to the King and arresting liberal). A month later (May 12) when British ships arrived, its officers were permitted to visit the local Governor and, with a group of prominent citizens, was convinced to adopt the liberal system: cheering in the streets were accompanied by salvos from the Fort. The fort was later taken by the forces loyal to Peter IV, as his regency attempted to take the Azores as a stepping stone to retake the throne from his absolutist brother Miguel.

In 1927 the fort's title was transferred to the Câmara Municipal of Horta, where it was to be demolished in order to make way for the coastal avenue (then in the planning stages and that supporters insisted would break the continuity of such a project). Members of the Junta Geral of the District had suggested transferring the fort stone-for-stone to Monte da Guia, in order to maintain "progress" in the district. Others, like Osório Golourt, Marcelino Lima, Sarmento Rodrigues and Augusto Arruda promoted maintenance, rehabilitation or even a tunnel beneath the structure. But, the lack of funds impeded this project and the fort was spared from demolition. By decree, the fort was classified as a national monument (No.36 383) on 28 June 1947.

Much later, the building was re-purposed as part of the network of Pousadas de Portugal, a project of the Direcção-Geral dos Edifícios e Monumentos Nacionais (DGEMN) (General-Directorate for Buildings and National Monuments), officially re-opened as a hostel on 9 August 1969, and designed by architect Alberto Cruz. Critics at the time found that this project, which involved the construction of rooms for visitors, lounge and services, destroyed the existing historical structure: only the defensive exterior walls and chapel remained intact. The 20th century remodelling and renovation, at a cost of 3.9 thousand Euros was completed by Enatur and Grupo Pestana Pousadas. On 18 June 2004, the Pousada began to operate under the "Pousadas de Charme" designation, followed on 23 September by the official inauguration, presented by the Minister of Tourism, Telmo Correia. Since its re-purposing the Fort has been referred to locally as the Pousada de Santa Cruz, Pousada de Horta or Estalagem de Santa Cruz.

== Architecture ==
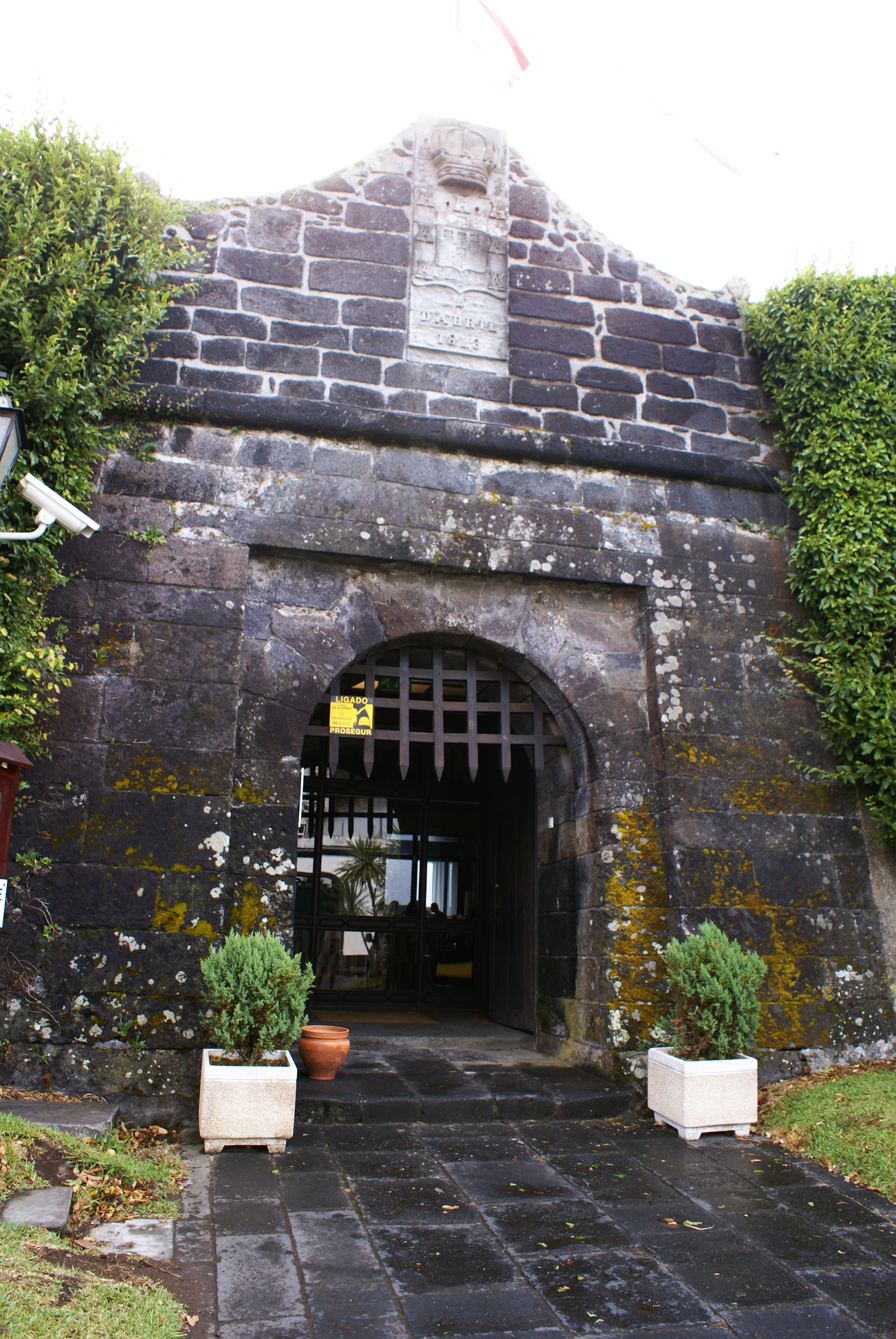
The main gate/portal of the fort and Pousada hostel

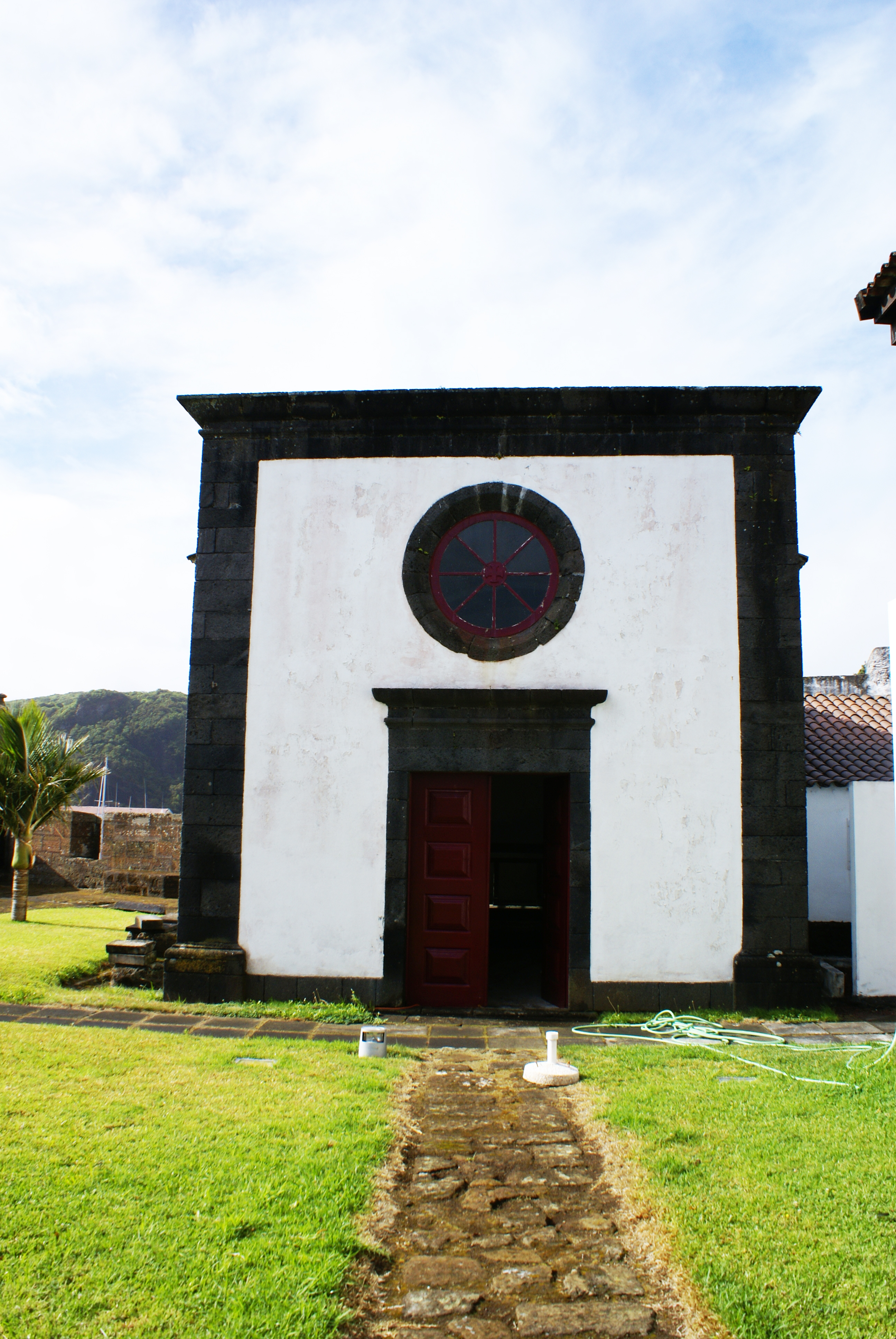
The Chapel of Santo António, within the walls of the fort

Originally, the fort was anchored on a rocky shoreline that extended into the harbour and surrounded by a narrow strip of beach sand on either side, with a small dock on its southern lateral wall (called theCais da Alfândega, or Customs wharf). The principal entrance, localized on the land (to the west) fronts Rua Vasco da Gama (Regional E.R.1-1ª), is marked by a large portal with coat-of-arms. Another access, but of more recent construction, is located along the side facing the harbour: a narrow doorway with rounded corridor that bisects the walls and opens to the fort's esplanade.

The pentagonal-shape bastion fortress, with an area of 3650 metres, was constructed of basalt rock and tuff (the latter primary in the construction of the battlements and bartizans. While two bartizans and one bastion guards access to the sea, two bastions on the extreme corners (northwest and southwest) are oriented towards the land to protect overland invasions.

The original plan included a baluarte structures and several dependent buildings: commander's house, barracks, gunpowder magazine, storehouses, bastille and kitchen.

At its maximum effectiveness, the fort included 20 pieces of artillery and had banquettes to support a garrison of Fusiliers.

The Chapel of Santo António, located along the southern wall of the fort, the chapel is a simple semi-rectangular building constructed of basalt and painted in white (with the exception of the stone cornices, the door- and window-frames and base). The Chapel of Santo António was built in order to support the local garrison: its interior, although simple, was covered in artistic azulejo tile.

After its remodelling, the pousada included 28 rooms and two suites, restaurant with esplanade, bar, conference and reading room (in addition to pool) was created from the main garrison's barracks.
