= Siege of Lincoln =

Coordinates: 53.2344°N 0.5386°W

- Part of the First English Civil War
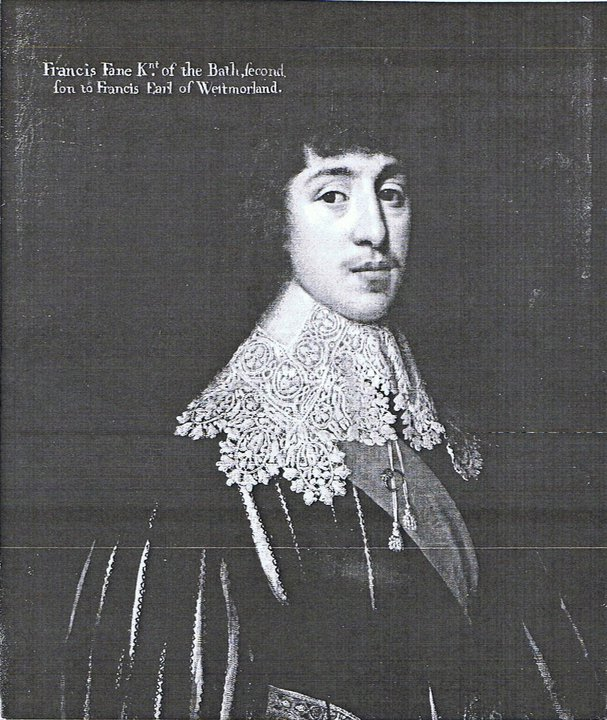
- Royalist garrison commander, Sir Francis Fane
Date	3 – 6 May 1644
Location	Lincoln, Lincolnshire
Result	Parliamentarian victory

Belligerents
Royalists	(Kingdom of England) Parliamentarians

Commanders and leaders
Sir Francis Fane (surrendered); Charles Dallison (surrendered)	Earl of Manchester; Oliver Cromwell

Strength
2,000 foot	6,000 foot and horse

Casualties and losses
50 killed 750–900 captured	8 killed 40 wounded

The siege of Lincoln took place from 3 to 6 May 1644 during the First English Civil War, when the important town of Lincoln was besieged by Parliamentarian forces under the Earl of Manchester. On the first day, the Parliamentarians took the lower town. The Royalist defenders retreated into the stronger fortifications of the upper town, which encompassed and incorporated Lincoln Castle and Lincoln Cathedral. The siege ended four days later when the Parliamentarian soldiers stormed the castle, taking prisoner the Royalist governor, Sir Francis Fane, and what remained of his garrison.

== Prelude ==
Early in 1644, Parliamentarian forces under Lord Willoughby besieged the Royalist stronghold of Newark-on-Trent. As overall commander of Parliamentarian forces in Lincolnshire, Willoughby ordered the Lincoln garrison to come to his aid. In April, a combined Parliamentarian-Scottish Covenanter force began the Siege of York, threatening the Royalist position in the north.In response, Charles I of England ordered his nephew Prince Rupert to relieve Newark and collect all the troops he could in Shropshire, Cheshire, and Wales. He would then march into Lancashire, where he would be reinforced by levies from the Royalist Earl of Derby's tenantry, then proceed into Yorkshire and relieve York.

Command of the Parliamentarian forces investing Newark passed to veteran Scottish soldier Sir John Meldrum, who chose to oppose Rupert rather than retreat. Rupert defeated him on the banks of the Trent on 22 March 1644 and relieved Newark. This allowed the Royalists to occupy the county, with a garrison taking possession of Lincoln on 23 March, where the Royalists found and requisitioned 2,000 muskets. The Parliamentarians abandoned Sleaford and on orders from Meldrum, Gainsborough was slighted so that it could not be garrisoned by the Royalists.

Key locations, East Midlands

However, Rupert decided that he could not hold his gains, and withdrew into the West Midlands, leaving a garrison in Lincoln under Sir Francis Fane. At the same time, the Marquess of Newcastle, Royalist commander in York, decided his cavalry would be of little use within the besieged city. Led by Lord Goring, they broke out of the city, and made their way to Newark.

The Parliamentarian army of the Eastern Association under the Earl of Manchester used Rupert's withdrawal as an opportunity to counterattack. In the last week of April, Manchester was at Stamford. He ordered his cavalry under the command of Oliver Cromwell to advance. They cleared Lincolnshire of marauding parties of Cavaliers from Newark and drove them across the Trent, where they joined Goring at Mansfield. Manchester then marched to Lincoln, arriving on 3 May 1644.

== Siege ==
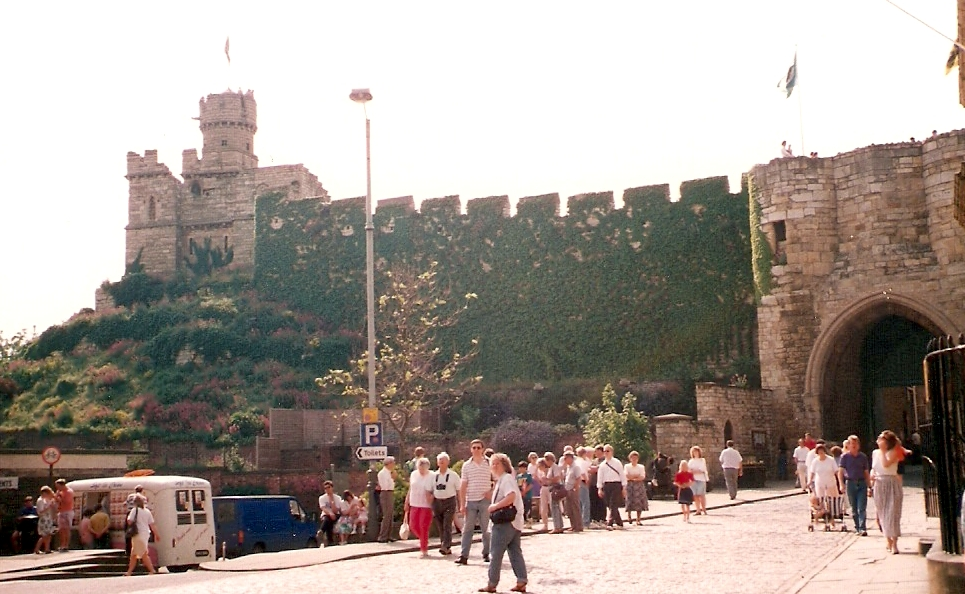
Partial view of the eastern gate (to the right; the observatory tower is to the left)

Manchester's army of about 6,000 infantry and cavalry faced a Royalist garrison around 2,000 strong. On 3 May, the Parliamentarians managed to capture parts of the lower town and the Royalists retreated to their upper works which surrounded Lincoln Castle and Lincoln Cathedral. The attack was suspended the next day, because heavy rain made the ground too slippery.

Cromwell posted his horse so as to cover the siege from any interruption from Goring. He made his dispositions so well that, hearing on 5 May that Goring had crossed the Trent, Cromwell's troopers were assembled and drawn up in little over an hour from the news being received. Goring, finding the outposts on the alert, fell back again. A contemporary Royalist report states that that night the Parliamentarians attempted to storm Lincoln Close but were repulsed with about 60 killed.

The castle was stormed on the night of 6 May; (Note: Sources differ. Baldock 1809, p. 138 records this attack as taking place on 5 May.) although the scaling ladders proved to be too short, but the Parliamentarians managed to scale the walls and enter the castle. The Royalists fled from the parapets and asked for quarter which was granted. Parliamentarian casualties were eight killed and about 40 wounded. The Royalists suffered about 50 killed with 100 officers and between 650 and 800 soldiers taken prisoner. Among the officers captured were Sir Charles Dallison, the former Recorder of Lincoln, and Sir Francis Fane. (Note: Baldock 1809, p. 138 cites Goode's True Relation, &c.; King's Pamphlets, E 47 and E 50. Inaction In Lincolnshire 139: Sir Francis Fane. 100 officers and gentlemen, and 800 soldiers being taken while Hill 1955, p. 157 says "Sir Francis Fane the governor, Dailston the former recorder, other officers and 650 men were taken prisoner.") The Parliamentarians also captured eight cannons, and much other useful materiel. (Note: Bell 1832, p. 51 quotes Rushworth Historical Collections, volume 5: "Sir Francis Fane, the governor of the castle, Sir Charles Dallison, two colonels, many inferior officers, 700 soldiers, 100 horse, eight pieces of cannon, with arms, ammunition, &c.")

== Aftermath ==
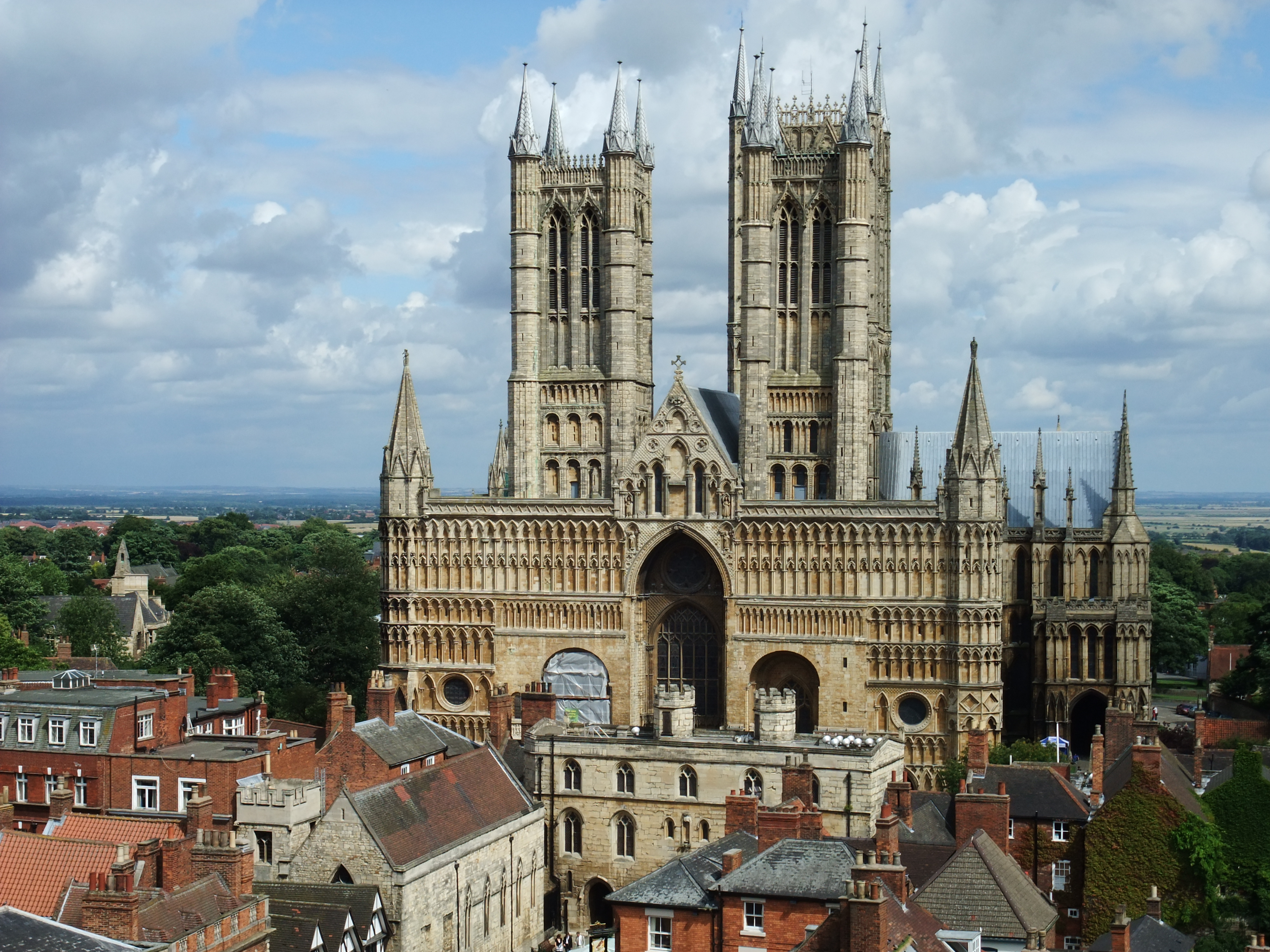
View from Lincoln Castle

The victorious Parliamentarian troops pillaged the upper town. On receipt of Manchester's report the Committee of Both Kingdoms in London sent him their congratulations. Shortly after the capture of Lincoln, Manchester ordered a bridge of boats to be built over the Trent at Gainsborough, and Cromwell crossed with 3,000 horse, while two regiments of foot (infantry) held the bridge. Goring appears to have had at least as many troopers as Cromwell, but the latter drove him up the Trent towards Newark, and headed him off at Mascomb Bridge, forcing him to swim the river in order to escape.

Cromwell then returned to Bawtry and Tuxford (both on the Great North Road), where David Leslie joined him with a strong party of Scottish horse and placed himself under his command. Goring crossed from Newark into Leicestershire, where he commenced plundering the country up and down. The allied generals, however, refused to allow their horse to follow him, being convinced by this time that Rupert intended to relieve York. They therefore kept their horse in hand in south Yorkshire and waited for Manchester to advance with his foot. Goring subsequently moved via Derbyshire to Bury in Lancashire, where he joined Rupert.

Manchester himself remained in Lincoln until around 22 May when he sent a report on his preparations for his advance to link up with the besiegers of York. He joined them on 3 June. Manchester, Fairfax and the Scots ultimately won a major victory over Rupert at the Battle of Marston Moor on 2 July.

== Sources ==
- Hill, J.W.F. (1955). Tudor & Stuart Lincoln. CUP Archive. ISBN 978-1-00-140586-5.
- Bell, J., ed. (January–June 1832). "Lady William Montague". Belle Assemblée: Or, Court and Fashionable Magazine; Containing Interesting and Original Literature, and Records of the Beau-monde. London: Edward Bull.

Attribution
