= Roger Dalison =

English courtier, Lieutenant-General of the Ordnance and Member of Parliament

Sir Roger Dalison, 1st Baronet (or Dallison or Dallyson; c.1562 – 1620), of Laughton, Lincolnshire, was an English courtier, Lieutenant-General of the Ordnance and Member of Parliament.

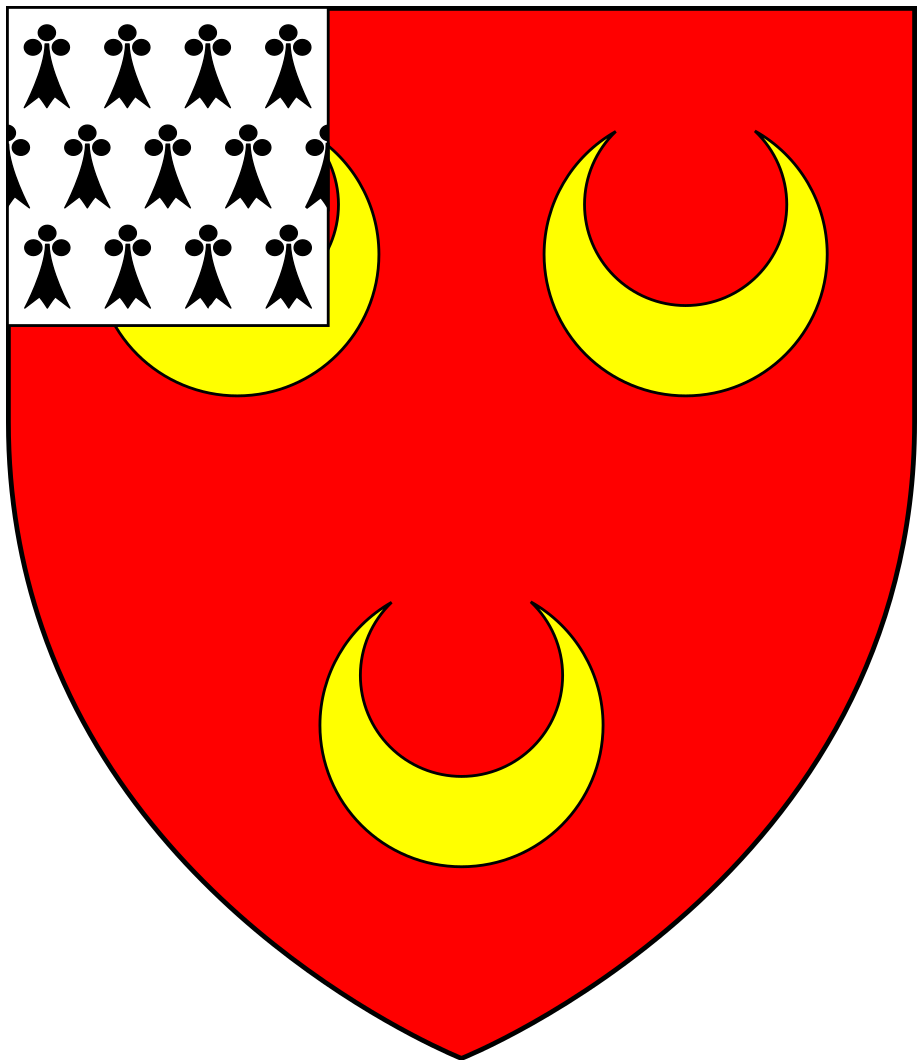
Arms of the Dalisons of Laughton

== Career ==
He was the eldest son of William Dalison of Laughton and Anne, daughter of Robert Dighton. He was educated at Exeter College, Oxford (1575) and Gray's Inn (1577). He succeeded his father in 1587 and was knighted in 1603. He attached himself to Henry Howard, Earl of Northampton and the latter's nephew, Thomas Howard, Earl of Suffolk.

With the help of those connections, he held a number of public commissions and offices, including those of Esquire of the Body (c.1605–c.1608), Gentleman of the Privy Chamber (by 1615) and Lieutenant-General of the Ordnance from 1608 to 1616. He was elected Member of Parliament for Malmesbury in 1604 and 1614, a seat then under the control of the Earls of Suffolk. He served as High Sheriff of Lincolnshire for 1601–02.

As Lieutenant of Ordnance, Dalison organised the firework displays on the Thames beside Whitehall Palace at the investiture of Prince Henry, London's Love to Prince Henry in May 1610, and at the wedding of Princess Elizabeth and Frederick V of the Palatinate in February 1613.

He purchased one of the earliest baronetcies in 1611 but was unable or unwilling to pay the whole price. After his death, an irregularity was discovered in the register of baronets, which meant that the surviving son, Thomas, could not automatically inherit the baronetcy. On 27 October 1624 the baronetcy was therefore recreated for him but became extinct when the unmarried Sir Thomas was killed at the Battle of Naseby in 1645.

== Imprisonment and death ==
Dalison was suspected of embezzling Ordnance funds, and in 1620 Laughton Manor (in West Lindsey) was confiscated and given to a clerk of the Ordnance.

Dalison died in the Fleet Prison in 1620 and was buried in St James, Clerkenwell. Lionel Cranfield, 1st Earl of Middlesex persuaded Dalison's widow and son Thomas Dalison to surrender their rights to Laughton for an annuity of £200.

== Marriages and children ==
He had married 3 times; firstly after 1588 Anne, the daughter of Sir Valentine Browne of Croft, Lincolnshire, secondly Elizabeth, the daughter of Marmaduke Tyrwhitt, of Scotter, Lincolnshire and thirdly by 1592, Elizabeth, the daughter of William Tuthill of Newton, Norfolk. He left one surviving son, Thomas, who was killed at the battle of Naseby, and a daughter by his third wife.

Parliament of England
Preceded by William Monson; Sidney Montagu	Member of Parliament for Malmesbury; 1604–14; With: Sir Thomas Dallison 1604–1610; Sir Neville Poole 1614	Succeeded by Henry Poole; Sir Edward Wardour
Baronetage of England
New creation	Baronet (of Laughton); 1611–1624	Succeeded by Thomas Dalison
