= Dallison, West Virginia =

Unincorporated community in West Virginia, United States

Dallison
- Unincorporated community
- Location within the state of West Virginia Dallison (the United States)
- Coordinates: 39°14′55″N 81°23′5″W
- Country: United States
- State: West Virginia
- County: Wood
- Elevation: 692 ft (211 m)
- Time zone: UTC-5 (Eastern (EST))
  - Summer (DST): UTC-4 (EDT)
- GNIS ID: 1537964

Dallison is an unincorporated community in Wood County, West Virginia, United States.
