= William Dalison =

16th-century English judge and politician

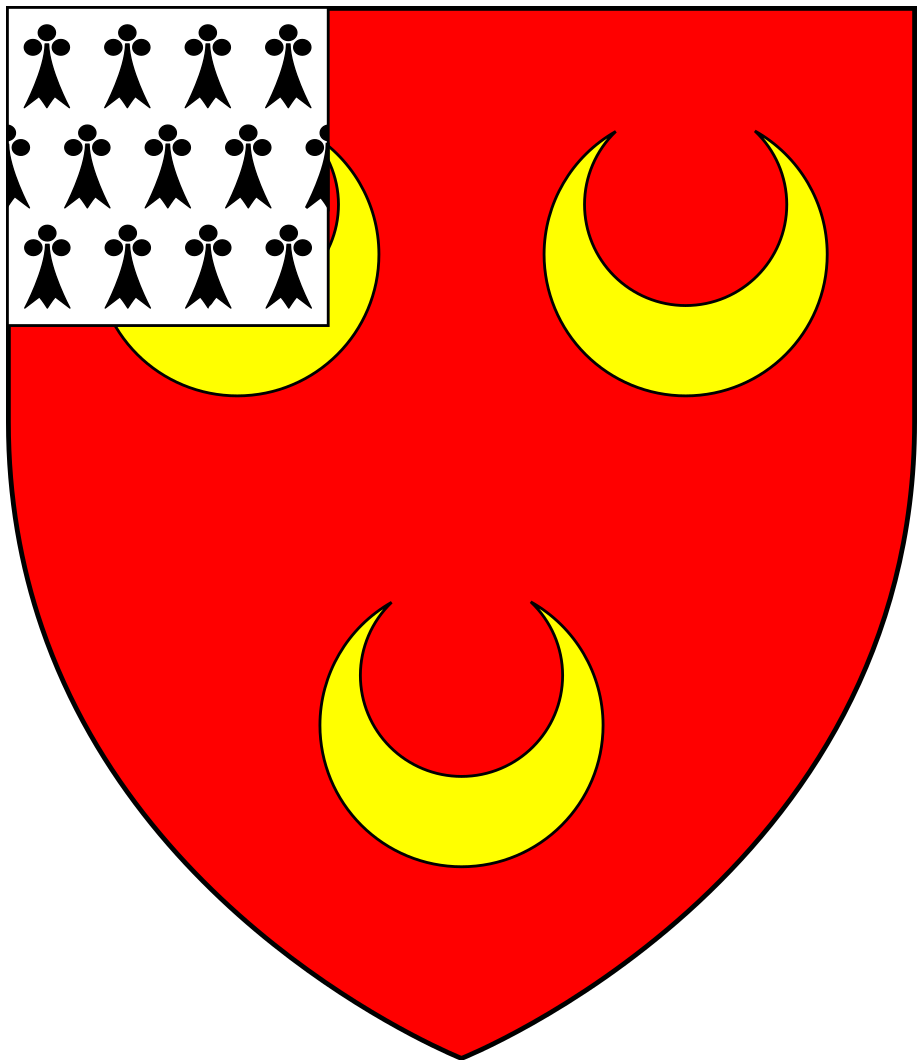
Arms of Dalison of Laughton: Gules, three crescents or a canton ermine

Sir William Dalison (died 1559) was an English judge who served as a Member of Parliament for Lincolnshire in 1553.

== Origins ==
He was the younger son of William Dalison (d.1546) of Laughton, Lincolnshire, Sheriff of Lincolnshire in 1546 and Escheator of Lincolnshire, by his wife, a daughter of George Wastneys of Haddon, Nottinghamshire.

== Career ==
He entered Gray's Inn in 1534 and was called to the bar in 1537. He was elected Reader of Gray's Inn in 1548 and again in 1552, on one of which occasions he gave a lecture on the statute 32 Hen. 8. c. 33, concerning wrongful disseisin, which is referred to in Dyer's Reports (219 a) as a correct statement of the law. He took the degree of serjeant-at-law in 1552, receiving from his Inn the sum of £5 and a pair of gloves. He served as a Member of Parliament for Lincolnshire in October 1553.

In 1554 he was appointed one of the justices of the County Palatine of Lancaster. In 1556 he was appointed a Justice of the King's Bench and was knighted. His patent was renewed on the accession of Queen Elizabeth I (November 1558).

== Marriage and children ==
He married Elizabeth Dighton, a daughter of Robert Dighton of Sturton Parva, Lincolnshire (who survived him and re-married to Sir Francis Ayscough), by whom he had issue four sons and five daughters. His descendants eventually settled in Kent, and were represented in the female line in the 19th century by Maximilian Hammond Dalison of Hamptons, near Tunbridge.

== Death and burial ==
He died in January 1559, and was buried in Lincoln Cathedral.

== Works ==
Dalison compiled a collection of cases decided during the reigns of Edward VI and Philip and Mary (Harley MS 5141). His so-called ‘Reports’ were published in the same volume with some by Serjeant William Benloe in 1689; but the greater portion of those attributed to Dalison were decided after his death. J. H. Baker writing in the Oxford Dictionary of National Biography comments that for the period 1546 to 1558 Dalison's cases are hard to separate from those of Richard Harpur.
