= Dallison baronets =

Extinct baronetcy in the Baronetage of England

The Dallison Baronetcy, of Greetwell in the County of Lincoln, was a title in the Baronetage of England. It was created in February 1644 for Robert Dallison, the son of Sir Charles Dallison, an officer in the Royalist Army during the Civil War. Sir Robert was himself a supporter of the Royalist cause. The title became extinct on the death of the fourth Baronet in circa 1720.

Not to be confused with the Dalison baronets of Laughton in the County of Lincoln, created in 1611.

== Dallison baronets, of Greetwell (1644) ==
- Sir Robert Dallison, 1st Baronet (c. 1617 – c. 1670)
- Sir Robert Dallison, 2nd Baronet (died c. 1680)
- Sir Thomas Dallison, 3rd Baronet (died 1713)
- Sir James Dallison, 4th Baronet (died c. 1720)
