= Charles Dallison =

English lawyer and soldier

Sir Charles Dallison (fl. 1620–1661) was a lawyer from Lincolnshire who served with the Royalist army during the First English Civil War. He was also a serjeant-at-law, and in 1648 he published an often cited pamphlet justifying his reasons for supporting the Royalist cause.

== Biography ==
Charles Dallison was the third son of Sir Thomas Dallison (d. 1626) of Greetwell, Lincolnshire, and Anne, daughter of Humfrey Littlebury, of Stainsby, in the same county. He was admitted to Gray's Inn in February 1620. He returned to Lincolnshire where by 1637 was the city of Lincoln's counsel, and became recorder of Lincoln in 1637.

In June 1642 it appeared that Lincolnshire would support the Parliamentary cause when at the instigation of Francis, Lord Willoughby they agreed to implement the Militia Ordinance. In July Charles I visited Lincoln in the hope of persuading the local gentry to support his cause, when he arrived at Lincoln on 14 July 1642, Dallison made the speech of loyalty on behalf of the city and was knighted by Charles. Sir Charles, was appointed by the King to the Commission of Array for Lincolnshire (to organise the recruitment for the nascent Royalist army). Towards the end of the year, when the battle lines were drawn he was commissioned into the Royalist army as a colonel of a regiment horse (cavalry). In retaliation for his active support for the royalist cause, Parliament to impeach him on 14 September 1642 and in December he was deprived of his Receivership.

On 9 March 1643 Sir Charles attacked parliamentary forces on Coddington Heath. On the 1 June while Parliamentary cavalry was absent from Lincolnshire supporting the siege of Nottingham, Royalist cavalry and dragoons sallied out from Gainsborough under the joint command of Sir John Brook, Sir Charles, and Captain Whichcote and attacked Market Rasen on 1 June 1643. On the following day they entered and occupied Louth. The next day, 3 June, they were driven out by a relief force from the Parliamentary garrison at Lincoln. About 100 Royalists were taken prisoner when the Parliamentarians retook Louth.

On 6 May 1644 Sir Charles was taken prisoner by the Eastern Association when they assaulted captured Lincoln, but after a short imprisonment was exchanged and at the end of the First Civil War was governor of Newark. He went to France in 1646 and was absent for the Second Civil War.

Sir Charles is notable as one of only seven Royalist delinquents exempted from the Parliamentary pardon passed by the commons on the 21 October 1648, and by the Lords on 24 October: Francis, Lord Cottington, George, Lord Digby, Sir Robert Heath, Sir Francis Doddington, Sir George Radcliffe and Sir Richard Grenville. However, on 11 November the House of Lords overturned their exemption on three of the men Lord Cottington, Sir Robert Heath and Sir Charles Dallison. He returned to England after the war and was fined £465, which was reduced to £351 in 1651.

During the interregnum Dallison was thought by the authorities to be in favour of a Roman Catholic alliance to restore Charles II to the throne, however P. R. Newman states although "he came from a partially recusant background, he writings imply impatience with religion in whatever form".

On 20 December 1661 The Lord Chancellor and Lord Treasurer approve the grant of certain lands in Lincolnshire to Sir Charles Dallison:

[The] Case of Sir Chas. Dallison justly stated: being a grandson of Judge Dallison, of the King's Bench, a younger brother and lawyer, he sacrificed the benefit of his profession for 18 years, spent much money, and became surety in large sums for the late King, for whom he raised forces in the wars; he was often imprisoned; was one of the 39 excepted from pardon; lost £1,000 in money, and £400 a year land, and compounded for his estate at half its value.

== Bibliography ==
In 1648, while exiled in France, Sir Charles Dallison published The Royalist defence; Vindicating the King's Proceedings in the late Warre made against him. P. R. Newman considers this to be "The most expansive and cogently argued of all Royalist self-vindications". In it he explains that he initially took up arms because of the Militia Ordinance which he considered an illegal act because the king did not give his royal assent to it. In the opinion of Dallison no new law can be passed without the assent of the king, so those who marched under the authority of the Militia Ordinance were committing high treason, and it was the duty of all loyal subjects to defend the king against those who break the law and commit high treason.

== Family ==
Most of Sir Charles's close family supported the Royalist cause. His uncle William Dallison and his son Robert Dallison fought for King Charles. In 1644 Robert was granted a baronetcy (see Dallison baronets), and along with his father were found by Parliament to be Royalist delinquents they their estates sequestrated and compounded for the sum of £1,300. This did not deter Sir Robert who in 1658 was known to be actively sympathetic to the Royalist cause. Thomas Dallison another Lincolnshire man from another branch of the family, was a Roylist colonel of horse who was slain at the Battle of Naseby in 1645.

Sir Charles had a number of children, and was probably a Roman Catholic, as one son became a Roman Catholic priest and two daughters became nuns.(Viola da Gamba Society (Great Britain) 1992, p. 18) He also had a number of other children including:

- Charles, who inherited property from him.
- Robert.
- Anne who married Sir William Thorold (d. 1666) of Hough.
