= Dalison baronets =

Extinct baronetcy in the Baronetage of England

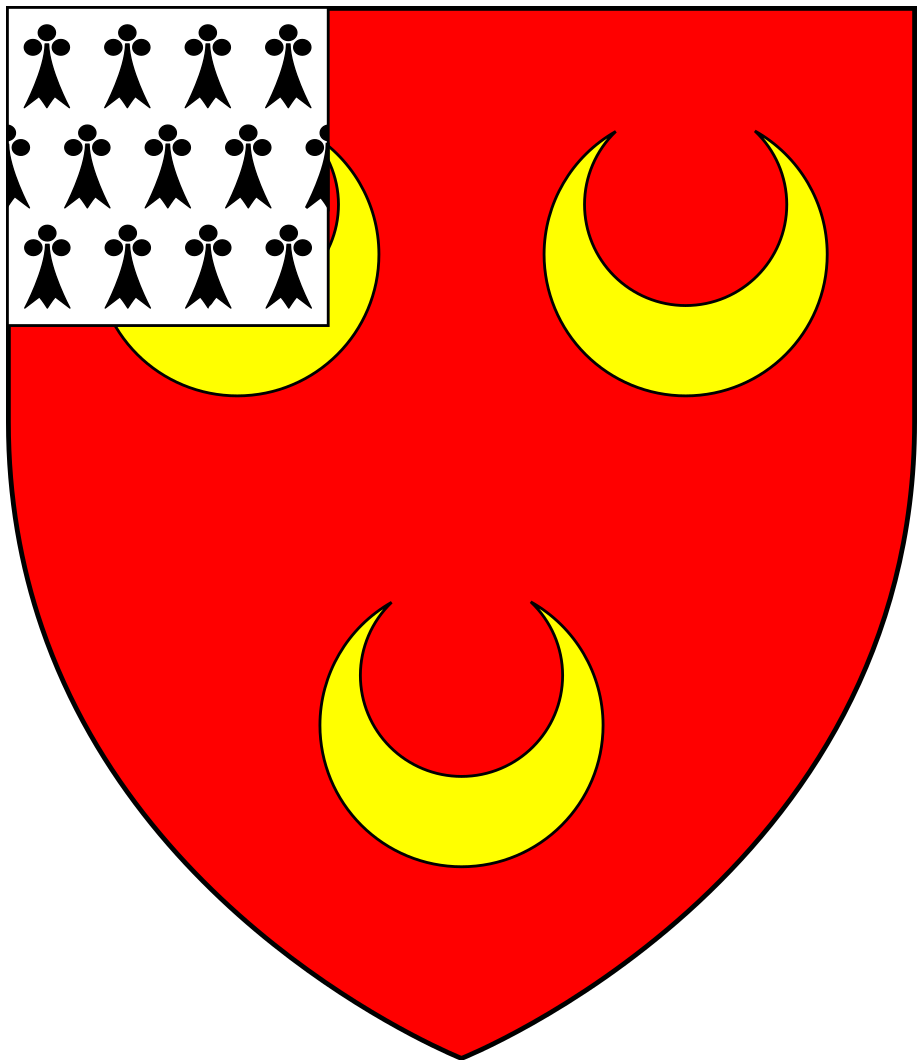
Arms of Dalison of Laughton: Gules, three crescents or a canton ermine

The Dalison Baronetcy, of Laughton in the County of Lincoln, was a title in the Baronetage of England. It was created on 29 June 1611 for Sir Roger Dalison, Lieutenant-General of the Ordnance, and member of parliament for Malmesbury. He purchased the baronetcy but was unable or unwilling to pay the price. He was also found to have embezzled large amounts of money from the Ordnance, and died in Fleet Prison as a debtor. After his death, a clerical error was discovered in the register of baronets, which meant that his surviving son, Thomas, could not automatically inherit the baronetcy. On 27 October 1624 it was recreated for Thomas Dalison. The title became extinct when Sir Thomas was killed at the Battle of Naseby in 1645.

Not to be confused with the Dallison baronets of Greetwell in the County of Lincoln, created in 1644.

== Dalison baronets, of Laughton (1611 and 1624) ==
- Sir Roger Dalison, 1st Baronet (c. 1562 – 1620)
- Sir Thomas Dalison, 1st Baronet (died 1645)
