= Parliamentary constituencies in Lincolnshire =

The location of Lincolnshire in relation to England.

The non-metropolitan county of Lincolnshire is divided into 8 parliamentary constituencies: 1 borough constituency and 7 county constituencies. (Note: Rutland and Stamford is a cross-county boundary constituency, comprising electoral wards in Leicestershire and Rutland, as well as in Lincolnshire.)

== Constituencies ==
† Conservative ‡ Labour ¤ Reform UK

Constituency (Note: BC denotes borough constituency, CC denotes county constituency.)	Electorate	Majority (Note: The majority is the number of votes the winning candidate receives more than their nearest rival.)	Member of Parliament	Nearest opposition	Map
Boston and Skegness CC	75,811	2,010	Richard Tice¤	Matt Warman†	Locator map of Boston and Skegness constituency in Lincolnshire from 2024
Gainsborough CC	75,836	3,532	Sir Edward Leigh†	Jess McGuire‡	Locator map of Gainsborough constituency in Lincolnshire from 2024
Grantham and Bourne CC	73,285	4,496	Gareth Davies†	Vipul Bechar‡	Locator map of Grantham and Bourne constituency in Lincolnshire from 2024
Lincoln BC	72,315	8,793	Hamish Falconer‡	Karl McCartney†	Locator map of Lincoln constituency in Lincolnshire from 2024
Louth and Horncastle CC	76,880	5,506	Victoria Atkins†	Sean Matthews¤	Locator map of Louth and Horncastle constituency in Lincolnshire from 2024
Rutland and Stamford CC (part)	71,763	10,394	Alicia Kearns†	Joe Wood‡	Locator map of Rutland and Stamford constituency in Lincolnshire from 2024
Sleaford and North Hykeham CC	75,651	4,346	Dr Caroline Johnson†	Hanif Khan‡	Locator map of Sleaford and North Hykeham constituency in Lincolnshire from 2024
South Holland and The Deepings CC	78,473	6,856	John Hayes†	Matthew Swainson¤	Locator map of South Holland and the Deepings constituency in Lincolnshire from 2024

== Boundary changes ==
=== 2024 ===
For the 2023 review of Westminster constituencies, which redrew the constituency map ahead of the 2024 United Kingdom general election, the Boundary Commission for England opted to combine Lincolnshire with Leicestershire and Rutland in a sub-region of the East Midlands region, creating one additional seat by re-establishing the constituency of Rutland and Stamford, spanning all three counties. Consequently, Stamford was removed from the constituency of Grantham and Stamford, which was renamed Grantham and Bourne.

Former name	Boundaries 2010–2024	Current name	Boundaries 2024–present
1. Boston and Skegness CC; 2. Gainsborough CC; 3. Grantham and Stamford CC; 4. Lincoln BC; 5. Louth and Horncastle CC; 6. Sleaford and North Hykeham CC; 7. South Holland and The Deepings CC	Proposed Revision	1. Boston and Skegness CC; 2. Gainsborough CC; 3. Grantham and Bourne CC; 4. Lincoln BC; 5. Louth and Horncastle CC; 6. Rutland and Stamford CC; 7. Sleaford and North Hykeham CC; 8. South Holland and The Deepings CC	Boundaries 2024–present

The following seats were proposed:

Containing electoral wards from Boston

- Boston and Skegness (part)

Containing electoral wards from East Lindsey

- Boston and Skegness (part)
- Louth and Horncastle

Containing electoral wards from Lincoln

- Lincoln (part)

Containing electoral wards from North Kesteven

- Grantham and Bourne (part)
- Lincoln (part)
- Sleaford and North Hykeham

Containing electoral wards from South Holland

- South Holland and The Deepings (part)

Containing electoral wards from South Kesteven

- Grantham and Bourne (part)
- Rutland and Stamford (also comprises the county of Rutland and parts of Harborough in Leicestershire)
- South Holland and The Deepings (part)

Containing electoral wards from West Lyndsey

- Gainsborough

=== 2010 ===
In the Fifth Review the Boundary Commission for England recommended that Lincolnshire retained its current constituencies, with minor changes only to reflect revisions to local authority ward boundaries and to reduce the electoral disparity between constituencies.

Name	Boundaries 1997–2010	Boundaries 2010–2024
1. Boston and Skegness CC; 2. Gainsborough CC; 3. Grantham and Stamford CC; 4. Lincoln BC; 5. Louth and Horncastle CC; 6. Sleaford and North Hykeham CC; 7. South Holland and The Deepings CC	Parliamentary constituencies in Lincolnshire	Proposed Revision

== Results history ==
Primary data source: House of Commons research briefing – General election results from 1918 to 2019

=== 2024 ===
The number of votes cast for each political party who fielded candidates in constituencies comprising Lincolnshire in the 2024 general election were as follows: (Note: It should be acknowledged that Rutland and Stamford is a cross-county constituency between Lincolnshire, Leicestershire and Rutland. As the results of UK general elections are not disclosed on sub-constituency levels, the following shares contain votes within the Leicestershire and Rutland areas of the Rutland and Stamford constituency.)

Party	Votes	%	Change from 2019	Seats	Change from 2019
Conservative	130,092	35.6%	▼31.6%	6	▼1
Labour	94,894	26.0%	▲5.2%	1	▲1
Reform	82,464	22.6%	▲22.3%	1	▲1
Liberal Democrats	23,808	6.5%	▼1.2%	0	0
Green	18,204	5.0%	▲3.1	0	0
Others	15,514	4.3%	▲2.2%	0	0
Total	364,976	100.0		8	

=== 2019 ===
The number of votes cast for each political party who fielded candidates in constituencies comprising Lincolnshire in the 2019 general election were as follows:

Party	Votes	%	Change from 2017	Seats	Change from 2017
Conservative	246,959	67.2%	▲5.6%	7	▲1
Labour	76,583	20.8%	▼7.7%	0	▼1
Liberal Democrats	28,389	7.7%	▲3.6%	0	0
Greens	6,815	1.9%	▲0.5%	0	0
Brexit	1,079	0.3%	new	0	0
Others	7,614	2.1%	▼2.3%	0	0
Total	367,439	100.0		7	

=== Percentage votes ===
Election year	1983	1987	1992	1997	2001	2005	2010	2015	2017	2019	2024
Conservative	53.2	53.8	53.5	42.4	46.2	46.8	49.8	51.6	61.6	67.2	35.6
Labour	15.1	18.5	25.8	36.9	35.7	29.5	19.4	20.1	28.5	20.8	26.0
Reform^{1}	–	–	–	–	–	–	–	–	–	0.3	22.6
Liberal Democrat^{2}	31.4	27.4	19.8	17.5	16.1	17.4	20.2	4.7	4.1	7.7	6.5
Green Party	–	*	*	*	*	*	0.2	2.0	1.4	1.9	5.0
UKIP	–	–	–	*	*	*	4.7	19.4	3.5	*	-
Other	0.3	0.4	0.9	3.1	1.9	6.3	5.8	2.2	0.9	2.1	4.3

^{1}As the Brexit Party in 2019

^{2}1983 & 1987 – SDP–Liberal Alliance

* Included in Other

=== Seats ===
Election year	1983	1987	1992	1997	2001	2005	2010	2015	2017	2019	2024
Conservative	6	6	6	6	6	6	7	7	6	7	5
Labour	0	0	0	1	1	1	0	0	1	0	1
Reform UK	0	0	0	0	0	0	0	0	0	0	1
Total	6	6	6	7	7	7	7	7	7	7	7

^{1}1983 & 1987 – SDP–Liberal Alliance

=== Maps ===
==== 1885-1910 ====
1885

1886

1892

1895

1900

1906

Jan 1910

Dec 1910

==== 1918-1945 ====
1918

1922

1923

1924

1929

1931

1935

1945

==== 1950-1979 ====
1950

1951

1955

1959

1964

1966

1970

Feb 1974

Oct 1974

1979

==== 1983-present ====
1983

1987

1992

1997

2001

2005

2010

2015

2017

2019

2024

== Historical representation by party ==
A cell marked → (with a different colour background to the preceding cell) indicates that the previous MP continued to sit under a new party name.

=== 1885 to 1918 ===
Conservative Liberal Liberal Unionist

Constituency	1885	86	1886	87	90	1892	93	94	1895	98	1900	1906	07	Jan 1910	Dec 1910	11	12	14	17
Boston	Ingram		Farmer-Atkinson			Ingram			Garfit			Faber		Dixon					
Brigg	Meysey-Thompson	→	Waddy					Richardson	Reckitt				Sheffield	Gelder					
Gainsborough	Bennett		Eyre			Bennett			Bainbridge		Ormsby-Gore	Renton	→	Bentham					
Grantham	Mellor		Low			Lopes					Priestley								
Grimsby	Heneage	→				Josse	Heneage		Doughty	→				Wing	Doughty		→	Tickler	
Horncastle	Stanhope							de Eresby								Weigall			
Lincoln	Ruston	→	Kerans			Crosfield			Seely			Roberts							
Louth	Otter		Heath			Perks								Brackenbury	Davies				
Sleaford	Chaplin											Lupton		Royds					
Spalding	Finch-Hatton			Stewart					Pollock		Mansfield			McLaren					Peel
Stamford	Lawrance				Cust				Younger			Joicey-Cecil		Heathcote-Drummond-Willoughby					

=== 1918 to 1950 ===
Conservative Independent Labour Liberal National Liberal (1931–68)

Constituency	1918	20	21	1922	23	1923	24	1924	29	1929	31	1931	33	1935	37	42	1945	48
Brigg	McLean			Sheffield						Quibell		Hunter		Quibell			Williamson	Mallalieu
Gainsborough	Molson					Winfrey		Crookshank										
Grantham	Royds			R. Pattinson		Warrender										Kendall		
Grimsby	Tickler			Sutcliffe				Womersley									Younger	
Holland with Boston	Royce						Dean		Blindell		→				Butcher			
Horncastle	Weigall	Hotchkin		S. Pattinson				Haslam									Maitland	
Lincoln	Davies							Taylor				Liddall					Deer	
Louth	Brackenbury	T. Wintringham	M. Wintringham					Heneage									Osborne	
Rutland and Stamford	Heathcote-Drummond-Willoughby			Dixon	Smith-Carington								de Eresby					

=== 1950 to 1983 ===
Conservative Labour Lincoln Democratic Labour National Liberal (1931–68)

Constituency	1950	1951	1955	56	1959	62	1964	1966	69	1970	73	Feb 1974	Oct 1974	77	1979
Brigg / Brigg and Scunthorpe (1974)	Mallalieu											Ellis			Brown
Gainsborough	Crookshank			Kimball											
Grantham	Smith	Godber													Hogg
Grimsby	Younger				Crosland									Mitchell	
Holland with Boston	Butcher							Body							
Horncastle	Maitland							Tapsell							
Lincoln	de Freitas					Taverne					→		Jackson		Carlisle
Louth	Osborne								Archer				Brotherton		
Rutland and Stamford	Conant				Lewis										

=== 1983 to present ===
Conservative Independent Labour Reform UK

Constituency	1983	1987	1992	1997	2001	2005	07	2010	2015	16	2017	19	2019	2024
Holland with Boston / Boston and Skegness (1997)	Body				Simmonds				Warman					Tice
Gainsborough and Horncastle / Gainsborough (1997)	Leigh													
Stamford & Spalding / Grantham & S. ('97) / G. & Bourne ('24)	Lewis	J. Davies					→	Boles				→	G. Davies	
Lincoln	Carlisle			Merron				McCartney			Lee		McCartney	Falconer
East Lindsey / Louth and Horncastle (1997)	Tapsell								Atkins					
Grantham / Sleaford and North Hykeham (1997)	Hogg							Phillips		Johnson				
South Holland and The Deepings				Hayes										

== See also ==
- Parliamentary constituencies in the East Midlands
- Parliamentary constituencies in Humberside for those covering North Lincolnshire and North East Lincolnshire unitary authorities.
