= Holland with Boston by-election =

Holland with Boston by-election may apply to one of three by-elections held for the British House of Commons constituency of Holland with Boston, in Lincolnshire.

- 1924 Holland with Boston by-election
- 1929 Holland with Boston by-election
- 1937 Holland with Boston by-election

See also

- Holland with Boston (UK Parliament constituency)
