= 1917 Spalding by-election =

Parliamentary byelection in Lincolnshire

The 1917 Spalding by-election was a parliamentary by-election held for the British House of Commons constituency of Spalding in Lincolnshire on 25 October 1917.

== Vacancy ==
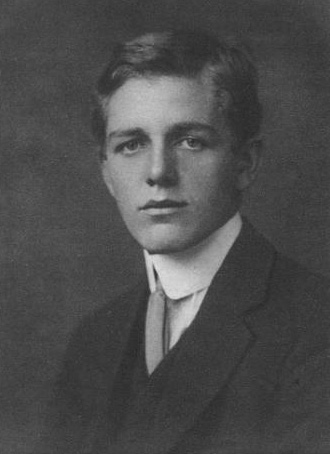
Francis McLaren

The by-election was caused by the death of the sitting Liberal MP, the Hon. Francis McLaren. McClaren was the younger son of Charles McLaren, 1st Baron Aberconway. He was first elected as Liberal MP for Spalding at the January 1910 general election. In 1916, he joined the Royal Flying Corps and was killed in a flying accident on 30 August 1917.

== Candidates ==
During the war a truce operated between the political parties which usually meant that by-elections went uncontested and the party holding the seat at the vacancy could put up a candidate who would not be opposed. However this truce was sometimes broken by Independents and in September 1917, Mr A Montagu Lyons (almost certainly the same Abraham Montagu Lyons who was later Conservative MP for Leicester East), published an appeal to the electors of Spalding indicating he would be prepared to stand as an Independent. He called for an overhaul of the conscription process, an increase in the pay of soldiers, sailors and airmen, the proper care of demobilized servicemen, the setting up of a Ministry of Health, air reprisals on enemy territory and a programme of national reconstruction. Lyons, a solicitor by profession, had served as a lieutenant in the army but had been invalided out. It was reported at the same time that the Liberals were considering a number of possible candidates and that once a candidate was selected the local Unionists would consider the nomination and if it was satisfactory to them would stick to the truce and not seek to contest the vacancy.

The Liberals adopted the Hon. George Peel as their candidate. However, despite their previous indication that they would honour the wartime truce, the Unionists now seriously considered contesting the by-election. The official newspaper of the local Unionist Association put forward the claim of William Royce who had fought the seat for the Tories in both January and December 1910. At the same time, Montagu was arranging to visit the constituency and confer with his supporters but on 22 October he decided not to submit a formal nomination, perhaps believing he had already made many of the political points he had wanted without actually having to provoke the controversy of contesting the election.

In the circumstances the Unionists were content to honour the wartime truce and no opposing candidate was nominated against Peel. Their former candidate William Royce would later get to enter Parliament but as a Labour MP for the seat of Holland with Boston which was created partially from the old Spalding seat for the 1918 general election. He beat a Coalition Conservative and by-election winner George Peel in a three-cornered contest. Peel tried once more to get back into Parliament, as Liberal candidate at Rugby in the 1922 general election but was beaten into second place by Euan Wallace, the Conservative candidate.

== Result ==
Peel was returned unopposed.

Spalding by-election, 1917
Party	Candidate	Votes	%	±%
Liberal	George Peel	Unopposed	N/A	N/A
Liberal hold				

== See also ==
- List of United Kingdom by-elections
- United Kingdom by-election records
