= Butcher baronets =

Extinct baronetcy in the Baronetage of the United Kingdom

There have been two baronetcies created for persons with the surname Butcher, both in the Baronetage of the United Kingdom. Both are extinct.

- The Butcher Baronetcy, of Danesfort in the County of Kerry, was created in the Baronetage of the United Kingdom on 28 June 1918 for John Butcher, the member of parliament (MP) for the City of York. He was subsequently ennobled as Baron Danesfort, and the baronetcy was merged with that title. Both titles became extinct on the death of the first Baronet in 1935.
- The Butcher Baronetcy, of Holland in the County of Lincoln, was created in the Baronetage of the United Kingdom on 22 July 1960 for Herbert Walter Butcher, the member of parliament for Holland with Boston. The title became extinct on the death of the first Baronet in 1966.
