= George Frederick Pollock =

British jurist

George Frederick Pollock (1 June 1821 – 19 May 1915) was a British barrister and Master of the Supreme Court.

The third son of the judge Sir Frederick Pollock, 1st Baronet, George Frederick Pollock was called to the Bar in 1843, when his father was Attorney-General. Interested in scientific matters, he achieved some distinction as an arbitrator in patent cases. He was appointed a Master of the Court of Exchequer in 1851 and Queen's Remembrancer in 1886, in succession to his brother Sir William Frederick Pollock, 2nd Baronet. When the Court of Exchequer was abolished, he became a Master of the Supreme Court, eventually becoming the Senior Master.

He married in 1851 Frances Diana (died 1891), daughter of the Rev. H. Herbert, Rector of Rathdowney; they six sons and two daughters. Several of their children achieved prominence. His eldest son, Harry Frederick Pollock, was Liberal Unionist Party MP for Spalding. Another son, William Rivers Pollock, was a well-known obstetrician. Another son, Ernest Pollock, 1st Viscount Hanworth, became Solicitor-General and Master of the Rolls. His youngest son, Bertram Pollock, was Bishop of Norwich.
