= 1924 Holland with Boston by-election =

UK parliamentary by-election

The 1924 Holland with Boston by-election was a by-election held on 31 July 1924 for the British House of Commons constituency of Holland with Boston in Lincolnshire.

The by-election was caused by the death of the town's Labour Member of Parliament (MP) William Stapleton Royce, who had held the seat since its creation for the 1918 general election. The Liberal candidate was the son of Sir Richard Winfrey, MP for South West Norfolk from 1906–1923 and Gainsborough from 1923-24.

The result was a victory for the Conservative Party candidate Arthur Dean.

== Result ==
By-election 1924: Holland with Boston
Party	Candidate	Votes	%	±%
Conservative	Arthur Dean	12,907	39.6	−6.3
Labour	Hugh Dalton	12,101	37.1	−17.0
Liberal	Richard Pattinson Winfrey	7,596	23.3	New
Majority		806	2.5	N/A
Turnout		32,604	77.2	+8.4
Conservative gain from Labour		Swing	-5.4	

== Sources ==
- Craig, F. W. S. (1983) [1969]. British parliamentary election results 1918-1949 (3rd ed.). Chichester: Parliamentary Research Services. ISBN 0-900178-06-X.
- Leigh Rayment's Historical List of MPs – Constituencies beginning with "H" (part 3)

== See also ==
- Holland with Boston constituency
- 1929 Holland with Boston by-election
- 1937 Holland with Boston by-election
- List of United Kingdom by-elections (1918–1931)
