= Herbert Butcher =

British politician (1901–1966)

Sir Herbert Butcher Bt
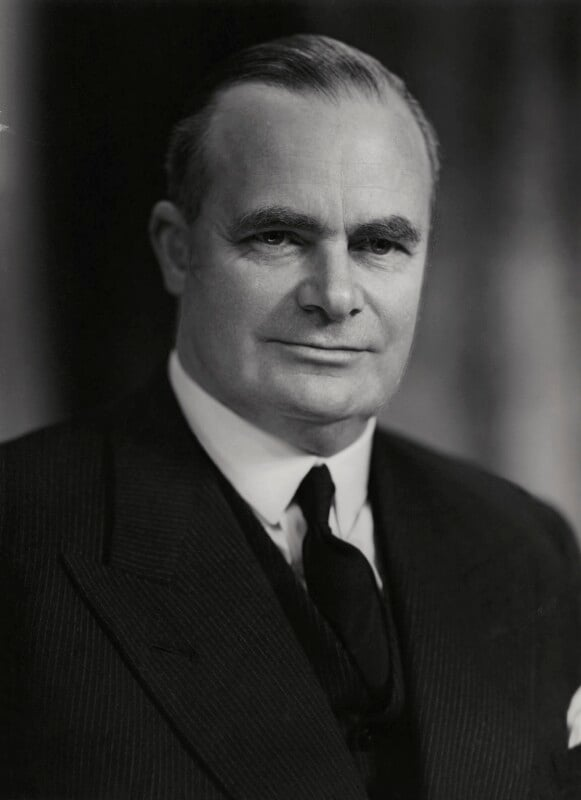
- Butcher in 1952

Member of Parliament for Holland with Boston
- In office 24 June 1937 – 10 March 1966
- Preceded by: James Blindell
- Succeeded by: Richard Body

Mayor of Hackney
- In office 1935–1937
- Preceded by: Henry Goodrich
- Succeeded by: Henry Capell

Personal details
- Born: Herbert Walter Butcher; 12 June 1901
- Died: 11 May 1966 (aged 64)
- Party: National Liberal (1948–1966)
- Other party: Liberal National (before 1948)
- Parent: Frank Butcher
- Education: Hastings Grammar School

Sir Herbert Walter Butcher, 1st Baronet (12 June 1901 – 11 May 1966) was an English Conservative and National Liberal politician. He sat in the House of Commons from 1937 to 1966.

== Early life ==
Butcher was the son of Frank Butcher. He was educated at Hastings Grammar School, and served in the Royal Navy during World War I, from 1916 to 1919. He was as a Hackney Borough Councillor from 1928 to 1961, serving as Mayor of Hackney from 1935 to 1937.

== Political career ==
He was elected as the Member of Parliament (MP) for Holland with Boston at a by-election in June 1937, after the death of the National Liberal MP Sir James Blindell. He held the seat at the next six general elections until his retirement at the 1966 general election, when Richard Body was elected as his successor.

From 1950 to 1951, Butcher was Parliamentary Private Secretary (PPS) to the Civil Lord of the Admiralty, Walter "Stoker" Edwards. He served as a Lord of the Treasury from 1951 to 1953.

== Personal life ==
In 1958, he advised his friend John Poulson to set up a servicing company to win business for his architect's practice.

Having been knighted on 10 February 1953, Butcher was created a Baronet of Holland in the County of Lincoln on 22 July 1960.

After 29 years as an MP, Butcher died less than two months after his retirement, aged 64.

Parliament of the United Kingdom
Preceded by Sir James Blindell	Member of Parliament for Holland with Boston; 1937 – 1966	Succeeded by Richard Body
Party political offices
Preceded by Alec Beechman	Chief Whip of the National Liberal Party; 1945–1966	Unknown
Baronetage of the United Kingdom
New creation	Baronet (of Holland); 1960–1966	Extinct
