= United Kingdom general elections overview =

Overview of general elections results in the United Kingdom

This is an overview of United Kingdom general election results since 1922. The 1922 UK general election was the first election in the new United Kingdom of Great Britain and Northern Ireland, after the creation of the Irish Free State removed Southern Ireland from the UK.

== Summary ==
The table below gives a summary of the results of each general election since 1922 for the main political parties. Those with the highest vote share and the most seats at each election are indicated in bold. More comprehensive detail showing all parties that fielded candidates is provided in subsequent sections.

Party	Conservative ^{[i]}		Labour		Liberal Democrats ^{[ii]}		SNP/PC ^{[iii]}		N.Ireland ^{[iv]}		Other		% Turnout	Total seats
Year	% vote	Seats	% vote	Seats	% vote	Seats	% vote	Seats	% vote	Seats	% vote	Seats	% Turnout	Total seats
1922 ^{[v]}	**38.5**	**344**	29.7	142	28.8	115	Included in Other (no seats won)		Ulster Unionist included with Conservative		3.0	14	73.0	615
1923	**38.0**	**258**	30.7	191	29.7	158	Included in Other (no seats won)		Ulster Unionist included with Conservative		1.6	8	71.1	615
1924	**46.8**	**412**	33.3	151	17.8	40	Included in Other (no seats won)		Ulster Unionist included with Conservative		2.1	12	77.0	615
1929	**38.1**	260	37.1	**287**	23.6	59	Included in Other (no seats won)		Ulster Unionist included with Conservative		1.2	9	76.3	615
1931 ^{[vi]}	**60.7**	**522**	30.6	52	6.5	32	Included in Other (no seats won)		Ulster Unionist included with Conservative		2.2	9	76.4	615
1935 ^{[vi]}	**53.3**	**429**	38.0	154	6.7	21	Included in Other (no seats won)		Ulster Unionist included with Conservative		2.0	11	71.1	615
1945	39.6	210	**48.0**	**393**	9.0	12	Included in Other (no seats won)		Ulster Unionist included with Conservative		3.4	25	72.8	640
1950	43.4	299	**46.1**	**315**	9.1	9	Included in Other (no seats won)		Ulster Unionist included with Conservative		1.4	2	83.9	625
1951	48.0	**321**	**48.8**	295	2.5	6	Included in Other (no seats won)		Ulster Unionist included with Conservative		0.7	3	82.6	625
1955	**49.7**	**345**	46.4	277	2.7	6	Included in Other (no seats won)		Ulster Unionist included with Conservative		1.2	2	76.8	630
1959	**49.4**	**365**	43.4	258	5.9	6	Included in Other (no seats won)		Ulster Unionist included with Conservative		1.3	1	78.7	630
1964	43.4	304	**44.1**	**317**	11.2	9	Included in Other (no seats won)		Ulster Unionist included with Conservative		1.3	0	77.1	630
1966	41.9	253	**48.0**	**364**	8.5	12	Included in Other (no seats won)		Ulster Unionist included with Conservative		1.6	1	75.8	630
1970	**46.4**	**330**	43.1	288	7.5	6	1.7	1	Ulster Unionist included with Conservative		1.3	5	72.0	630
1974 (Feb)	**37.9**	297	37.2	**301**	19.3	14	2.5	9	2.3	12	0.8	2	78.8	635
1974 (Oct)	35.8	277	**39.2**	**319**	18.3	13	3.5	14	2.4	12	0.8	0	72.8	635
1979	**43.9**	**339**	36.9	269	13.8	11	2.0	4	2.2	12	1.2	0	76.0	635
1983	**42.4**	**397**	27.6	209	25.4	23	1.5	4	2.5	17	0.6	0	72.7	650
1987	**42.2**	**376**	30.8	229	22.6	22	1.7	6	2.2	17	0.5	0	75.3	650
1992	**41.9**	**336**	34.4	271	17.8	20	2.4	7	2.3	17	1.2	0	77.7	651
1997	30.7	165	**43.2**	**419**	16.8	46	2.5	10	2.5	18	4.3	1	71.3	659
2001	31.7	166	**40.7**	**413**	18.3	52	2.5	9	3.1	18	3.7	1	59.4	659
2005	32.4	198	**35.2**	**356**	22.1	62	2.4	9	2.6	18	5.3	3	61.4	646
2010	**36.1**	**307**	29.0	258	23.0	57	2.3	9	2.3	18	7.3	1	65.1	650
2015 ^{[vii]}	**36.8**	**331**	30.4	232	7.8	8	5.3	59	2.3	18	17.4	2	66.4	650
2017	**42.3**	**318**	40.0	262	7.4	12	3.5	39	2.5	18	4.3	1	68.8	650
2019	**43.6**	**365**	32.2	203	11.5	11	4.4	52	2.5	18	5.8	1	67.3	650
2024	23.7	121	**33.7**	**412**	12.2	72	2	13	2.8	18	25.3	15	59.9	650

Notes

i. Includes: Ulster Unionists up to and including the 1970 election; the autonomous Unionist Party in Scotland until 1964; and the Liberal National Party (and joint candidates) from 1945 to 1966.

ii. Liberal Party up to 1979; SDP–Liberal Alliance in 1983 and 1987; Liberal Democrats from 1992.

iii. Scottish National Party and Plaid Cymru (Party of Wales) combined. Prior to 1970, these are included in the Other column.

iv. Northern Ireland parties: up to 1970, party affiliations largely followed those of the rest of the UK (with Ulster Unionists included with the Conservatives); from 1974, Northern Ireland had a completely independent party system and the vote share and seats listed represent the totals for Northern Ireland.

v. In 1922, the Liberals were split between the main Liberal Party (18.9%, 62 seats) and the National Liberals (9.9%, 53 seats).

vi. ^{^^} In 1931 and 1935, the figures for the Conservatives relate to National Government candidates and comprise Conservative, National Labour, Liberal National and National vote share and seats.

vii. In 2015, Other included record vote shares for both the UK Independence Party (12.6%) and the Green Party (3.8%), each winning just one seat.

Votes percentage at United Kingdom general elections from 1922 to 2019

Seats won at United Kingdom elections from 1922 to 2019

== 2015–2019 ==
The period from 2015 to 2019 was one of the most turbulent in British electoral history. Following the Conservative–Liberal Democrat coalition, the Conservatives, led by David Cameron, won the 2015 UK general election with a small majority, having promised to hold a referendum on continued membership of the European Union. This election saw the Liberal Democrats' vote fall from 23% to 8%, and the number of elected Lib Dem MPs dropped from 57 to 8. In terms of the popular vote, they were replaced as the third party by the UK Independence Party, who achieved a 13% vote share, although they won only one seat. The Green Party also achieved their best ever result with 4% of the popular vote. In Scotland, the Scottish National Party gained 50% of the popular vote, winning all but three of the 59 seats, mostly at the expense of the Labour Party.

Following the EU referendum held in June 2016, which resulted in a majority of 52:48 to leave, Cameron resigned as Prime Minister and was replaced by Theresa May. She called a snap election in June 2017, but the Conservatives lost their overall majority and had to rely on the support of the ten MPs from the Democratic Unionist Party to continue in Government. The following two years were dominated by attempts to pass through Parliament a negotiated deal on the terms for leaving the EU, but these were opposed by both Brexiteers and Remainers in the Conservative Party, as well as the opposition parties. May eventually resigned and Boris Johnson became prime minister. After further government defeats, a general election was held in December 2019—the first December election since 1923—which resulted in an 80-seat majority for the Conservatives, gaining many seats that Labour had held since at least 1945. The United Kingdom formally left the European Union on 31 January 2020.

Party	2019		2017		2015	
Party	Popular vote (%)	Seats	Popular vote (%)	Seats	Popular vote (%)	Seats
Advance Together	0.0	0	–	–	–	–
Alliance (NI)	0.4	1	0.2	0	0.2	0
Alliance for Green Socialism	0.0	0	0.0	0	0.0	0
Animal Welfare Party	0.0	0	0.0	0	0.0	0
Aontu	0.0	0	–	–	–	–
BNP	0.0	0	0.0	0	0.0	0
Christian	0.0	0	0.0	0	0.0	0
Christian Peoples Alliance	0.0	0	0.0	0	0.0	0
Communist	–	–	–	–	0.0	0
Communities United	0.0	0	–	–	–	–
Conservative Party	43.6	365	42.3	317	36.2	330
Democratic Unionist Party	0.8	8	0.9	10	0.6	8
English Democrats Party	0.0	0	0.0	0	0.0	0
Green Party of England and Wales	2.6	1	1.6	1	3.8	1
Green Party of Northern Ireland	0.0	0	–	–	–	–
Gwlad Gwlad	0.0	0	–	–	–	–
Independents	0.8	0	0.5	1	0.3	1
Independent Group for Change	0.0	0	–	–	–	–
Justice and Anti-corruption	0.0	0	–	–	–	–
Labour Party	32.2	203	40.0	262	30.4	232
Liberal Democrats	11.5	11	7.4	12	7.8	8
Liberal Party	0.0	0	0.0	0	0.0	0
Libertarian	0.0	0	–	–	–	–
Mebyon Kernow	0.0	0	–	–	0.0	0
Monster Raving Loony	0.0	0	0.0	0	0.0	0
National Front	–		–	–	0.0	0
National Health Action	–	–	0.1	0	0.1	0
North East Party	0.0	0	–	–	–	–
Peace Party	0.0	0	–	–	–	–
People Before Profit	0.0	0	–	–	–	–
Plaid Cymru	0.5	4	0.5	4	0.6	3
RESPECT The Unity Coalition	–	–	–	–	0.0	0
Scottish Family Party	0.0	0	–	–	–	–
Scottish Green Party	0.1	0	0.0	0	0.1	0
Scottish National Party	3.9	48	3.0	35	4.7	59
Scottish Socialist Party	–	–	–	–	0.0	0
Sinn Féin	0.6	7	0.7	7	0.6	4
SDLP	0.4	2	0.3	0	0.3	3
Social Democratic Party	0.0	0	0.0	0	0.0	0
Socialist Equality Party	0.0	0	–	–	–	–
Socialist Labour	–	–	0.0	0	0.0	0
Socialist Party of GB	0.0	0	–	–	–	–
The Brexit Party	2.0	0	–	–	–	–
The Yorkshire Party	0.1	0	–	–	–	–
Trade Unionist and Socialist Coalition	–	–	–	–	0.1	0
Traditional Unionist Voice	–	–	0.0	0	0.1	0
Ulster Unionist	0.3	0	0.3	0	0.4	2
UK Independence Party	0.1	0	1.8	0	12.6	1
Veteran and People's Party	0.0	0	–	–	–	–
Women's Equality Party	0.0	0	–	–	–	–
Workers' Party	–	–	0.0	0	0.0	0
Workers Revolutionary Party	0.0	0	–	–	–	–
Yeshua	0.0	0	–	–	–	–
Young People's Party	0.0	0	–	–	–	–

== 1979–2010 ==
This period saw five prime ministers, with Margaret Thatcher and Tony Blair the two longest serving UK premiers since the World War II (the others during this period were John Major, Gordon Brown and David Cameron). There was also a mini-revival of the Liberal Party which, after a merger with the Social Democratic Party became the Liberal Democrats and increased their seats in parliament from 11 in the 1979 election to 62 in 2005. Following their victory in 1979, the Conservatives also won the subsequent three general elections, resulting in 18 years of continuous power. The newly formed Social Democratic Party and the Liberal Party contested the 1983 and 1987 elections as the SDP–Liberal Alliance. Although the combined parties achieved a popular vote of 22.6% in 1983, they initially failed to make a breakthrough in terms of seats, winning 22.

The Labour party won a landslide victory in 1997 and were also successful in 2001 and 2005. The now merged Liberal Democrats also improved their seat count in this period. The outcome of the 2010 election brought about the first hung parliament since 1974. The victorious Conservative Party accepted the Liberal Democrats as their coalition partner. In Northern Ireland, the Good Friday Agreement has led to a reduction in conflict, though the traditional parties who gained power in the 1980s, such as the Ulster Unionist Party, have been replaced as the dominant powers by the likes of Sinn Féin and the Democratic Unionist Party. The elections of the 1990s and 2000s also saw a proliferation of smaller parties, with more parties standing in 2005 than ever before. Voter turnout also fell during this period, with the 2001 election seeing a post-World War II low of 59.4%.

Party	2010		2005		2001		1997		1992		1987		1983		1979	
Party	Popular vote (%)	Seats	Vote %	Seats	Vote %	Seats	Vote %	Seats	Vote %	Seats	Vote %	Seats	Vote %	Seats	Vote %	Seats
Alliance (NI)	0.1	1	0.1	0	0.1	0	0.2	0	0.2	0	0.2	0	0.2	0	0.3	0
Alliance for Green Socialism	0.0	0	0.0	0	0.0	0	-	-	-	-	-	-	-	-	-	-
BNP	1.9	0	0.7	0	0.2	0	0.1	0	0.1	0	0.0	0	0.0	0	-	-
Christian	0.1	0														
Christian Peoples	0.0	0	0.0	0	-	-	-	-	-	-	-	-	-	-	-	-
Communist	0.0	0	0.0	0	0.0	0	0.0	0	0.0	0	0.1	0	0.0	0	0.1	0
Community Action Party	-	-	0.0	0	-	-	-	-	-	-	-	-	-	-	-	-
Conservative	36.1	306	32.4	198	31.7	166	30.7	165	41.9	336	42.2	376	42.4	397	43.9	339
Dem. Unionist	0.6	8	0.9	9	0.7	5	0.3	2	0.3	3	0.3	3	0.5	3	0.2	3
Eng. Dems	0.2	0	0.1	0	-	-	-	-	-	-	-	-	-	-	-	-
Green Party of England and Wales / Green	0.9	1	1.0	0	0.6	0	0.3	0	0.5	0	0.3	0	0.2	0	0.1	0
Independents	0.2	1	0.5	1	0.4	0	0.1	1	0.1	0	-	-	0.1	0	-	-
Independent Conservative	-	-	-	-	-	-	0.0	0	0.1	0	-	-	0.0	0	0.0	0
IKHHC	0.1	0	0.1	1	0.1	1	-	-	-	-	-	-	-	-	-	-
Independent Labour	-	-	-	-	-	-	0.0	0	0.1	0	-	-	0.1	0	0.1	1
Independent Liberal / Ind. Lib. Dem.	-	-	-	-	-	-	0.0	0	-	-	0.0	0	0.0	0	0.0	0
Ind. SDLP	-	-	-	-	-	-	-	-	-	-	-	-	-	-	0.0	0
Irish Independence	-	-	-	-	-	-	-	-	-	-	-	-	-	-	0.1	0
Labour	29.0	258	35.2	356	40.7	412	43.2	418	34.4	271	30.8	229	27.6	209	36.9	269
Legalise Cannabis	-	-	0.0	0	0.0	0	-	-	-	-	-	-	-	-	-	-
Lib Dems/ SDP–Liberal Alliance/ Liberal	23.0	57	22.1	62	18.3	52	16.8	46	17.8	20	22.6	22	25.4	23	13.8	11
Liberal (1989)	0.0	0	0.1	0	0.1	0	0.1	0	0.2	0	-	-	-	-	-	-
Mebyon Kernow	0.0	0	0.0	0	0.0	0	0.0	0	0.0	0	0.0	0	0.0	0	-	-
Monster Raving Loony	0.0	0	0.0	0	0.0	0	0	0	0.1	0	0.0	0	0.0	0	-	-
National Front	0.0	0	0.0	0	0.0	0	0.0	0	0.1	0	0.0	0	0.1	0	0.6	0
Nation. Dem.	-	-	-	-	-	-	0.0	0	-	-	-	-	-	-	-	-
Natural Law	-	-	-	-	-	-	0.1	0	0.2	0	-	-	-	-	-	-
People's Justice	-	-	-	-	0.0	0	-	-	-	-	-	-	-	-	-	-
Plaid Cymru	0.6	3	0.6	3	0.7	4	0.5	4	0.5	4	0.4	3	0.4	2	0.4	1
Prog. Unionist	-	-	-	-	0.0	0	0.1	0	-	-	-	-	-	-	-	-
ProLife	-	-	-	-	0.0	0	0.1	0	-	-	-	-	-	-	-	-
Protestant Unionist	-	-	-	-	-	-	-	-	-	-	0.0	0	-	-	-	-
Referendum	-	-	-	-	-	-	2.6	.	-	-	-	-	-	-	-	-
RESPECT The Unity Coalition	0.1	0	0.3	1	-	-	-	-	-	-	-	-	-	-	-	-
Scot. Green	0	0.1	0.1	0	-	-	-	-	-	-	-	-	-	-	-	-
Scot. Labour	-	-	-	-	-	-	-	-	-	-	-	-	-	-	0.1	0
Scot. Militant Labour	-	-	-	-	-	-	-	-	0.1	0	-	-	-	-	-	-
SNP	1.7	6	1.6	6	1.8	5	2.0	6	1.9	3	1.3	3	1.1	1	1.6	2
Scottish Socialist Party	0.0	0	0.2	0	0.3	0	0.0	0	-	-	-	-	-	-	-	-
Sinn Féin / Indep. Rep.	0.6	5	0.6	5	0.7	4	0.4	2	0.2	0	0.3	1	0.3	1	0.1	1
SDLP	0.4	3	0.5	3	0.6	3	0.6	3	0.5	4	0.5	3	0.4	1	0.4	1
Social Dem.	0.0	0	-	-	-	-	-	-	0.1	0	See SDP–Liberal Alliance				-	-
Soc. Labour	0.0	0	0.1	0	0.2	0	0.2	0	-	-	-	-	-	-	-	-
Soc. Alliance	-	-	0.0	0	0.0	0	0.0	0	-	-	-	-	-	-	-	-
TUSC	0.1	0	-	-	-	-	-	-	-	-	-	-	-	-	-	-
Traditional Unionist Voice	0.1	0	-	-	-	-	-	-	-	-	-	-	-	-	-	-
Ulster Popular Unionist / Indep. Ulster Unionist	-	-	-	-	-	-	-	-	0.1	1	0.1	1	0.1	1	0.1	1
Ulster Unionist / Ulster Conservatives and Unionists - New Force	0.3	0	0.5	1	0.8	6	0.8	10	0.8	9	0.8	9	0.8	1	0.8	5
Unionist Party	-	-	-	-	-	-	-	-	-	-	-	-	-	-	0.0	0
United Ulster Unionist	-	-	-	-	-	-	-	-	-	-	-	-	-	-	0.1	1
UKIP	3.1	0	2.3	0	1.5	0	0.3	0	-	-	-	-	-	-	-	-
UK Unionist / Real Unionist	-	-	-	-	0.1	0	0.1	1	-	-	0.1	0	-	-	-	-
Veritas	-	-	0.1	0	-	-	-	-	-	-	-		-	-	-	-
Workers'	-	-	0.0	0	0.0	0	0.0	0	0.1	0	0.1	0	0.0	0	0.1	0

== 1955–1974 ==
The elections of this period took place in the context of the decolonialisation of the British Empire and the UK's declining status as a Great Power. It also saw the UK enter the European Union and some periods of high unemployment. The early years of the period saw Conservative consolidation of power, before Harold Wilson's two general election wins in 1964 and 1966. There was then a series of close fought elections, including two in 1974. This period was also the one in which the Liberal Party was at its all-time low, never having more than 14 seats (though it had been in 1951 when they'd had their lowest ever percentage of the vote). The Ulster Unionists dominated in Northern Ireland, whilst the Scottish National Party and Plaid Cymru became major players for the first time, the SNP gaining 11 seats in 1974. This period also saw the demise of the autonomous Unionist Party in Scotland and the National Liberal Party, which both merged with the Conservative Party.

Party	Oct 1974		Feb 1974		1970		1966		1964		1959		1955	
Party	Popular vote (%)	Seats	Popular vote (%)	Seats	Popular vote (%)	Seats	Popular vote (%)		Popular vote (%)	Seats	Popular vote (%)	Seats	Popular vote (%)	Seats
Alliance (NI)	0.2	0	0.1	0	-	-	-	-	-	-	-	-	-	-
BNP	-	-	-	-	-	-	0.0	0		-	-	-	-	-
Communist	0.1	0	0.1	0	0.1	0	0.2	0	0.2	0	0.1	0	0.1	0
Conservative Party	35.8	277	37.9	297	46.4	330	41.9	253	43.4	304	49.4	365	49.7	345
Democratic Labour	0.1	0	0.1	1	-	-	-	-	-	-	-	-	-	-
Democratic Party	-	-	-	-	0.1	0	-	-	-	-	-	-	-	-
Democratic Unionist Party	0.3	1	0.2	1	-	-	-	-	-	-	-	-	-	-
Independents	0.0	0	0.1	0	0.1	0	0.1	0	0.1	0	0.0	0	0.2	0
Independent Conservative	0.0	0	0.0	0	0.1	0	0.0	0	0.0	0	0.1	1	-	-
Independent Labour	0.2	0	0.1	1	0.1	1	0.0	0	-	-	-	-	0.0	0
Independent Liberal	0.0	0	0.2	0	0.0	0	0.0	0	0.1	0	0.0	0	-	-
Independent Socialist	-	-	0.0	0	-	-	-	-	-	-	-	-	-	-
Independent Republican / Sinn Féin	0.2	1	0.0	0	-	-	0.2	0	0.4	0	0.2	0	0.6	2
Labour Party	39.2	313	37.2	301	43.1	288	48.0	364	44.1	317	43.4	258	46.4	277
Labour Party (Ireland)	-	-	-	-	-	-	-	-	-	-	-	-	0.1	0
Labour Party(NI)	0.0	0	0.0	0	-	-	-	-	-	-	-	-	-	-
Liberal Party	18.3	13	19.3	14	7.5	6	8.5	12	11.2	9	5.9	6	2.7	6
National Front	0.4	0	0.2	0	0.1	0	-	-	-	-	-	-	-	-
National Democratic	-	-	-	-	0.1	0	0.0	0	0.0	0	-	-		
National Democrats (NI)	-	-	-	-	0.1	0	-	-	-	-	-	-	-	-
Nationalist (NI)	-	-	-	-	-	-	0.1	0	-	-	-	-	-	-
NI Independent Labour	-	-	-	-	-	-	-	-	-	-	0.1	0		
Plaid Cymru	0.6	3	0.5	2	0.6	0	0.2	0	0.2	0	0.3	0	0.2	0
Protestant Unionist Party	-	-	-	-	0.1	1	-	-	-	-	-	-	-	-
Republican Clubs	0.1	0	0.0	0	-	-	-	-	-	-	-	-	-	-
Republican Labour	-	-	-	-	0.1	1	0.1	1	0.1	0	-	-		
Scottish National Party	2.9	11	2.0	7	1.1	1	0.5	0	0.2	0	0.1	0	0.0	0
SDLP	0.6	1	0.5	1	-	-	-	-	-	-	-	-	-	-
Ulster Unionist Party	0.9	6	0.8	7	Before 1974, The UUP MPs sat in parliament as part of the Conservative Party									
Unionist (NI) / Pro-Assembly Unionist	0.1	0	0.3	0	-	-	-	-	-	-	-	-	-	-
Unity	-	-	0.0	0	0.4	2	-	-	-	-	-	-	-	-
Vanguard Progressive Unionist Party	0.3	3	0.2	3	-	-	-	-	-	-	-	-	-	-

== 1929–1951 ==
This era saw massive social change in the UK, going through the Great Depression of the 1930s, resulting in a National Government; the Coalition Government of the Second World War led by Winston Churchill; and the socialist Labour government of Clement Attlee. This was also the period of the Liberal Party's major collapse and the completion of Labour's rise to power. The 1929 election resulted in the Labour Party having the greatest number of seats and they formed a Government under Ramsay MacDonald with the support of the Liberals. As a result of the growing economic crisis, McDonald formed a National Government in 1931 with the support of the Conservatives and Liberals, which was not however backed by the majority of Labour MPs.

This was followed by a general election at which the National coalition, dominated by the Conservatives, won a landslide victory, with the opposition Labour Party reduced to a rump of 52 seats. It also led to a permanent split in the Liberal Party, with the National Liberals eventually joining the Conservatives. Although Labour recovered somewhat, the (notional) National Government won the 1935 election. General elections were suspended during the Second World War, when all three major parties entered into a coalition under Churchill. The Labour party gained a landslide victory in 1945. Although they won a small majority in the 1950, they were defeated by the Conservatives in 1951, with Churchill returning to power.

Party	1951		1950		1945		1935		1931		1929	
Party	Popular vote (%)	Seats	Popular vote (%)	Seats	Popular vote (%)	Seats	Popular vote (%)	Seats	Popular vote (%)	Seats	Popular vote (%)	Seats
Agricultural Party	-	-	-	-	0.0	0	0.0	0	0.0	0	-	
Anti-Partition	0.0	0	0.0	0	-	-	-	-	-	-	-	-
Common Wealth	-	-	-	-	0.5	1	-	-	-	-	-	-
Commonwealth Labour	-	-	-	-	0.1	0	-	-	-	-	-	-
Communist	0.1	0	0.3	0	0.4	2	0.1	1	0.3	0	0.2	0
Conservative Party	44.3	302	40.0	283	36.2	197	47.8	387	55.0	470	38.1	260
Independent	0.1	0	0.2	0	0.6	8	0.1	2	0.0	1	0.4	4
Independent Conservative	0.0	0	0.1	0	0.2	2	0.1	0	-	-	-	-
Independent Labour	-	-	0.1	0	0.3	2	0.1	0	0.1	0	0.1	1
Independent Labour Party	0.0	0	0.0	0	0.2	3	0.7	4	-	-	-	-
Independent Liberal	-	-	0.1	0	0.1	2	0.0	0	0.0	0	0.1	0
Independent Nationalist	0.3	2	-	-	0.0	0	-	-	0.0	0	-	-
Independent Progressive	-	-	-	-	0.1	1	0.0	0	-	-	-	-
Independent Republican	-	-	-	-	-	-	0.2	0	-	-	-	-
Irish Nationalist	-	-	0.2	2	0.4	2	0.2	2	0.4	2	0.1	3
Labour Party	48.8	295	46.1	315	47.7	393	38.0	154	30.8	52	37.1	287
Labour Party (Ireland)	0.1	1	0.2	0	-	-	-	-	-	-	-	-
Liberal Party	2.5	6	9.1	9	9.04	12	6.7	21	6.5	32	23.6	59
Liberal Party (Lloyd George)		-	-	-	-	-	-	-	0.5	4	-	-
Liverpool Protestant	-	-	-	-	0.0	0	0.0	0	0.0	0	-	-
National	-	-	-	-	0.5	2	0.3	1	0.5	4	-	-
National Independent	-	-	0.0	0	0.3	2	0.2	2	0.2	2	-	-
National Labour	-	-	0.0	0	-	-	1.5	8	1.5	13	-	-
National Liberal	3.7	19	3.4	16	2.9	11	3.7	33	3.7	35	-	-
National Party of Scotland	-	-	-	-	-	-	-	-	0.1	0	0.0	0
New Party	-	-	-	-	-	-	-	-	0.2	0	-	-
Plaid Cymru	0.0	0	0.1	0	0.0	0	0.0	0	0.0	0	0.0	0
Scottish National Party	0.0	0	0.0	0	0.1	0	0.2	0	-	-	-	-
Scottish Prohibition	-	-	-	-	-	-	-	-	0.1	0	0.1	1
Sinn Féin	0.1	0	0.1	0	-	-	-	-	-	-	-	-

== 1922–1924 ==
In the years after the secession of the Irish Free State, the Conservatives led the House of Commons, with a surging Labour Party and a declining Liberal Party. The Communist Party of Great Britain also enjoyed their most prolonged period of success, though still failed to return more than one MP at any time. The Conservatives won the 1922 election, with the Labour party in second place and the Liberals split. In 1923, the Conservatives lost their majority, and the Labour Party were put into office for the first time with the support of the re-united Liberals. However, this minority government only lasted 10 months, and the Conservatives returned to power in 1924 with a large majority. The Liberal Party reduced to a rump of 40 MPs, from which they never really recovered.

Party	1924		1923		1922	
Party	Popular vote (%)	Seats	Popular vote (%)	Seats	Popular vote (%)	Seats
Agricultural Party	–	–	–	–	0.2	0
Belfast Labour Party	0.2	0	–	–	–	–
Communist	0.2	1	0.2	0	0.2	1
Constitutionalist	1.2	7	0.1	0	0.1	1
Conservative	46.8	412	38.0	258	38.5	344
Independent	0.2	2	0.3	2	0.8	3
Independent Conservative	0.0	0	0.1	0	0.9	3
Independent Labour	0.0	0	0.2	0	0.1	1
Independent Liberal	–	–	0.1	1	0.1	1
Independent Nationalist	–	–	–	–	0.1	0
Irish Nationalist	0.0	1	0.4	3	0.4	3
Labour Party	33.3	151	30.7	191	29.7	142
Labour Party (Northern Ireland)	0.1	0	–	–	–	–
Liberal Party	17.8	40	29.7	158	18.9	62
National Liberal	–	–	–	–	9.9	53
Scottish Prohibition	0.1	1	0.1	1	0.1	1
Sinn Féin	0.2	0	–	–	–	–

== See also ==
- Elections in the United Kingdom
- List of United Kingdom general elections
