= Horace Rendall Mansfield =

British politician

Mansfield

Horace Rendall Mansfield (25 December 1863 – 9 February 1914) was a British Liberal Party politician.

== Family ==
He was the second son of Cornelius Mansfield of Stratford, Essex. He married in 1885, Mary Annie Rose of Mansfield. They had three sons and one daughter. She died in 1905. He then married in 1908, Sarah Elizabeth Winterton of Leicester.

== Career ==
He was a manufacturer of clay goods, mainly tiles. He was a Justice of the Peace in Derbyshire. He was Liberal MP for Spalding Division of Lincolnshire from 1900 to 1910. He was elected at the 1900 General Election, gaining the seat from the Liberal Unionist Party by a majority of just 57 votes. He was comfortably re-elected in 1906 before retiring in January 1910.

Parliament of the United Kingdom
Preceded by Harry Frederick Pollock	Member of Parliament for Spalding; 1900–January 1910	Succeeded by Francis McLaren
