= 1956 Gainsborough by-election =

UK Parliamentary by-election

The 1956 Gainsborough by-election was held on 14 February 1956. It was held due to the elevation of the incumbent Conservative MP, Harry Crookshank to a hereditary peerage. It was won by the Conservative candidate Marcus Kimball. The Liberals polled over 20% of the vote, having not fielded a candidate in 1955. After the by-election Kimball was Baby of the House.

Gainsborough by-election, 1956
Party	Candidate	Votes	%	±%
Conservative	Marcus Kimball	12,836	40.8	−15.0
Labour	Henry Walston	11,830	37.6	−6.6
Liberal	Henry Ivan Spence	6,806	21.6	New
Majority		1,006	3.2	−8.4
Turnout		31,472		
Conservative hold		Swing		
