= Robert Henderson (writer) =

British writer (born 1947)

- Born: 1947 (age 77–78)

Robert Henderson (born 1947) is an English writer who has caused public controversy with his views on racial issues and his letters to the former British Prime Minister Tony Blair. He lives in Central London.

Henderson spent his early childhood in Cheshire before moving to Hertfordshire, where he was educated at St Albans School, later graduating from Keele University. Before retiring due to ill health, he worked for the Inland Revenue, while also retaining a strong personal interest in cricket.

== Controversy ==
=== Cricket ===
In 1995 he became the subject of attention from the British media after Wisden Cricket Monthly published his essay "Is It In The Blood?", which used language such as "negro" and implied that foreign-born, black and Asian players would be less committed to the team. A legal action taken against Wisden by black England cricketers Devon Malcolm and Phillip DeFreitas was settled out of court.

=== Tony Blair ===
Henderson claimed media bias against him together with censorship of his views and wrote a number of letters to his constituency Labour MP, Frank Dobson, and later to Tony Blair (then the opposition leader) and also to Blair's wife Cherie. In March 1997 Blair is said to have contacted the police asking for a means to stop this "pestering"; on 25 March 1997, a story accusing Henderson explicitly of "pestering" the Blairs appeared on the front page of the Daily Mirror. Henderson frequently claimed that Special Branch and the security services have, on Blair's instructions, interfered with his mail and tapped his telephone, leading to Sir Richard Body, a Conservative MP, putting forward an Early Day Motion in support of Henderson.

== Writings ==
Henderson has written most frequently in recent years for the political magazine Right Now! and the English nationalist/cultural magazine Steadfast. Right Now, which ceased publication in 2006, could be described as of the Old Right, while Steadfast, which also appears to have ceased publication, had wider political appeal (and was becoming increasingly "green"). He has not written for Wisden since the 1995 controversy. With the demise of his domestic outlets Henderson began submitting his writings to the American white supremacist publication American Renaissance. He also writes an internet blog entitled "England Calling", where he espouses English supremacist viewpoints and gives indications of his close dealings with the BNP.
