= 1929 Holland with Boston by-election =

UK parliamentary by-election

← 1924	21 March 1929	1929 →

Candidate	Blindell	Blanco White	Van den Berg
Party	Liberal	Labour	Unionist
Popular vote	13,000	9,294	8,257
Percentage	38.1%	27.3%	24.2%
Candidate	Dennis
Party	Agricultural Party
Popular vote	3,541
Percentage	10.4%
MP before election
Arthur Wellesley Dean
Unionist
Subsequent MP
James Blindell
Liberal

The 1929 Holland with Boston by-election was a by-election held on 21 March 1929 for the British House of Commons constituency of Holland with Boston in Lincolnshire.

The by-election was caused by the death of the Unionist Member of Parliament, Arthur Dean; who had held the seat at the 1924 general election. At that election, Labour came second and the Liberals finished third. Labour had won the seat in 1918, but it had been gained by the Unionists at a by-election just before the 1924 general election.

== Candidates ==
The new Unionist candidate chosen to defend the seat was Frederick J. Van den Berg. He was born and raised in Johannesburg, before moving to London to practise as a Barrister in 1916. He was standing as a candidate for the first time. The Labour Party candidate was George Blanco White, a lawyer who had stood here last time. The Liberals chose a new candidate in James Blindell, a Grimsby councillor and managing director of a boot manufacturing business. The election was marked by the presence of an Independent Agriculturalist candidate, F. W. Dennis.

== Campaign ==
On 1 March, nationally, Liberal leader, David Lloyd George launched the Liberal programme for the upcoming general election, titled We Can Conquer Unemployment. On the eve of poll, the voters of Eddisbury elected a Liberal in place of a Unionist.

== Result ==
The result was a victory for the Liberal Party candidate James Blindell, who overturned a Unionist majority of 4,770 to win by a majority of 3,706 votes.

By-election 1929: Holland with Boston
Party	Candidate	Votes	%	±%
Liberal	James Blindell	13,000	38.1	+18.4
Labour	G. R. Blanco White	9,294	27.3	−5.5
Unionist	Frederick J. Van den Berg	8,257	24.2	−23.3
Agricultural Party	F.W. Dennis	3,541	10.4	New
Majority		3,706	10.8	N/A
Turnout		34,092	75.6	−0.2
Liberal gain from Unionist		Swing	+15.9	

== Aftermath ==
A general election followed in a matter of months. Blindell held the seat for the Liberals, with Van den Berg again standing for the Unionists, finishing second. White did not stand again and the new Labour candidate dropped to third place. The Agricultural Party did not contest the seat. Blindell remained MP until his death in 1937.

This was the last by-election gain for the Liberal Party until the 1958 Torrington by-election.

== See also ==
- Holland with Boston constituency
- 1924 Holland with Boston by-election
- 1937 Holland with Boston by-election
- List of United Kingdom by-elections (1918–1931)

== Sources ==
- Craig, F. W. S. (1983) [1969]. British parliamentary election results 1918-1949 (3rd ed.). Chichester: Parliamentary Research Services. ISBN 0-900178-06-X.
- Leigh Rayment's Historical List of MPs – Constituencies beginning with "H" (part 3)
