= Seymour Fitzroy Ormsby-Gore =

British politician

Captain The Honourable Seymour Fitzroy Ormsby-Gore, FRGS (18 January 1863 – 10 November 1950) was a British Conservative politician.

== Biography ==
Ormsby-Gore was the youngest son of William Ormsby-Gore, 2nd Baron Harlech (1819–1904) by his wife Lady Emily Charlotte Seymour (died 1892), daughter of Admiral Sir George Francis Seymour and sister of Francis Hugh George Seymour, 5th Marquess of Hertford. His father also served as a Conservative politician, and inherited the barony of Harlech from his brother in 1882, when his children received the style the Honourable.

He graduated from the University of Oxford and was commissioned a lieutenant in the 4th (Militia) Battalion of the Oxfordshire Light Infantry in 1885, serving as such until 1889. In February 1900 he was appointed a captain in the 3rd Kent Artillery Volunteers.

He was elected a Member of Parliament for Gainsborough in 1900, serving as such until 1906 when he resigned.

He died unmarried in 1950 aged 87.

Parliament of the United Kingdom
Preceded by Emerson Muschamp Bainbridge	Member of Parliament for Gainsborough; 1900 – 1906	Succeeded by Leslie Renton
