= John Molson (British politician) =

British politician

Dr John Elsdale Molson
- Molson in 1922.

Member of Parliament for Gainsborough
- In office 14 December 1918 – 16 November 1923
- Preceded by: George Jackson Bentham
- Succeeded by: Richard Winfrey
- Majority: 2,078 (13.6%)

Personal details
- Born: 6 August 1863 Montreal, Province of Canada
- Died: 28 November 1925 (aged 62) Goring-by-Sea, Sussex, United Kingdom
- Resting place: St Mary's Church, Goring-by-Sea
- Party: Conservative
- Spouse: Mary Leeson
- Education: Cheltenham College
- Alma mater: Emmanuel College, Cambridge

Military service
- Allegiance: United Kingdom
- Branch/service: British Army
- Unit: Royal Army Medical Corps
- Battles/wars: World War I: Middle Eastern theatre
- Awards: TD

Major John Elsdale Molson TD (1863–1925) was a Canadian-born British Conservative politician and member of the Molson family of Montreal that started the Molson brewery.

John Molson was the son of Agnes and Samuel Elsdale Molson, born in Montreal on 6 August 1863. Educated at Cheltenham College and Emmanuel College, Cambridge, he qualified from the Middlesex Hospital Medical School in 1889. The Medical Register for 1891 listed him as employed at the Middlesex Hospital in London having registered as a doctor on 19 September 1889.

He held a commission in the Royal Army Medical Corps (Territorials) from 1900 and served at home and in Egypt in World War I.

He practised for some years at Chelmsford. From 1906 he rented Goring Hall at Goring-by-Sea near Worthing, in Sussex and lived the life of a country gentleman. He died on 28 November 1925, aged 62, and his funeral was held at St Mary's Church, Goring on 2 December 1925.

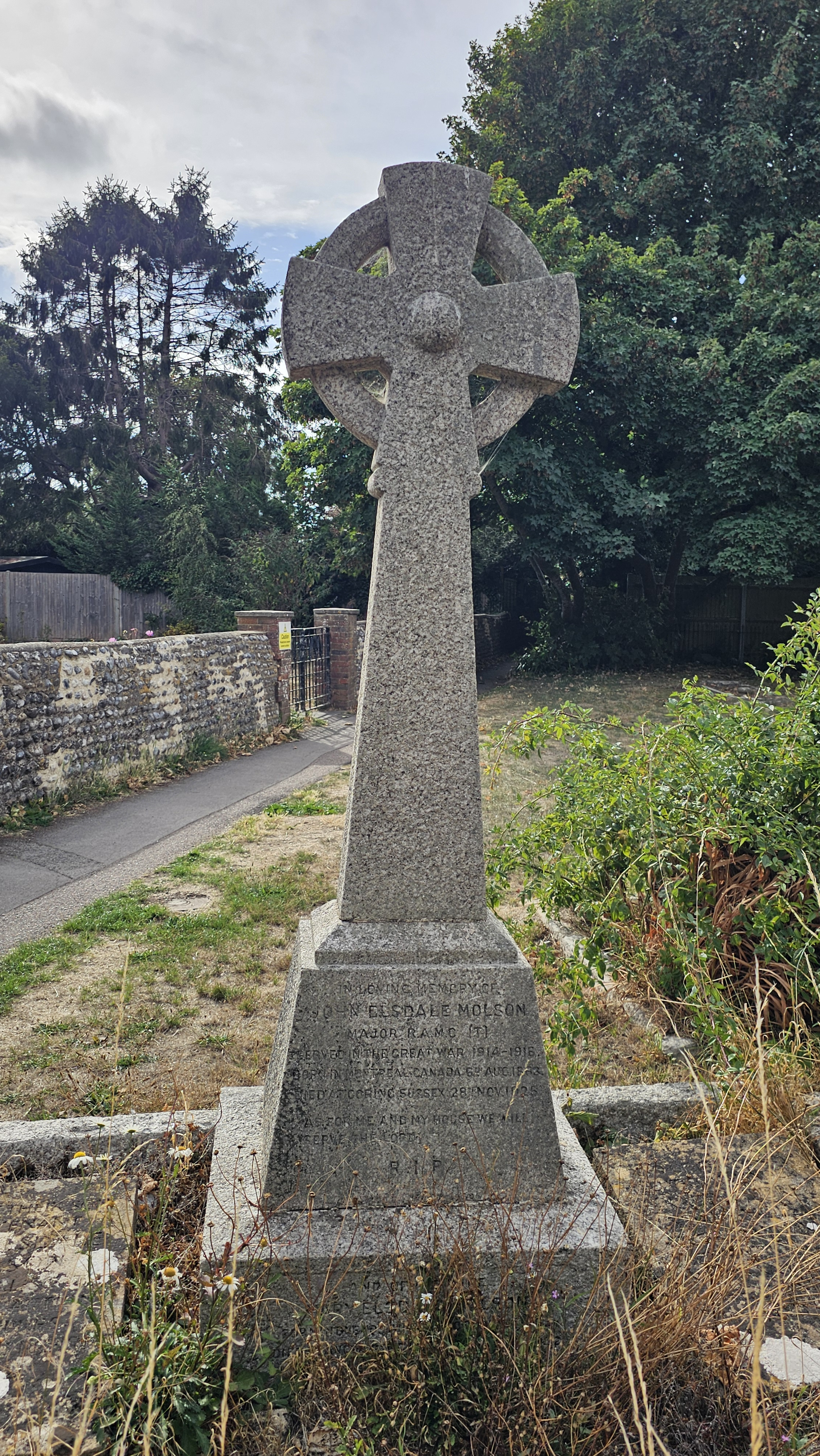
Molson's gravestone at St Mary's Church, Goring-by-Sea

He was the Unionist Member of Parliament for Gainsborough, Lincolnshire from 1918 to 1923, having unsuccessfully contested Bethnal Green North East in the two 1910 general elections. On 22 November 1920 Irish Nationalist MP Joseph Devlin raised the Croke Park deaths the previous day, causing uproar. Devlin continued to try to put his question and was assaulted by Molson who pulled him over the bench. The Speaker suspended the sitting for 15 minutes; when it resumed, Molson apologised and Devlin was able to ask his questions and to get an answer. He lost his seat to the Liberal Sir Richard Winfrey in the 1923 general election.

== Family ==
He married Mary Leeson in 1891 in London. She had been born in Argentina, the daughter of Dr Arthur Edmund Leeson, and christened at St John's Cathedral in Buenos Aires on 16 June 1863.

His son Arthur Hugh Elsdale Molson (1903–1991) was a Conservative politician and was created a Life Peer in 1961 as Baron Molson. His three other sons died in military service: Harold Elsdale Molson died on 5 February 1946 as a major in Princess Patricia's Canadian Light Infantry, Eric Elsdale Molson was killed in action on Good Friday, 1 April 1915 as a lieutenant in the Royal Scots (Lothian Regiment), and Gerald Hildred Elsdale Molson was killed serving as second in command of HMS Rawalpindi when she was sunk by the German warships Scharnhorst and Gneisenau on 23 November 1939.

Parliament of the United Kingdom
Preceded by George Jackson Bentham	Member of Parliament for Gainsborough; 1918–1923	Succeeded by Richard Winfrey
