= George Jackson Bentham =

British Liberal Party politician

George Jackson Bentham (1863-21 October 1929) was a British Liberal Party politician.

== Background ==
He was born as George Jackson in Hull in 1863, the son of William and Sarah Jackson. He was educated at Hull and privately. He married Ada Marshall, daughter of Thomas and Ann Marshall. They had two daughters. He assumed the name of Bentham by special licence.

== Career ==
He was managing director for Jackson & Son, Ltd, general food providers. He was a member of Hull City Council from 1892 to 1910. He served as a justice of the peace in the East Riding, and also in the city of Hull. He contested the safe Conservative seat of Central Hull at the 1906 General Election, and finished second. He served as member of parliament for the seat of Gainsborough, Lincolnshire from 1910 to 1918. The Liberal Party had won the seat at the 1906 election but their candidate subsequently defected to the Liberal Unionists. The local Liberal selected Bentham to replace him and he held the seat at both the General Elections of 1910. At the end of the war he defended his seat against a Unionist who had received the endorsement of the Coalition Government, and was defeated;

General election 1918 Electorate 27,503
Party	Candidate	Votes	%	±%
Unionist	John Elsdale Molson	8,634	56.8	
Liberal	George Jackson Bentham	6,556	43.3	
Majority				
Turnout				
Unionist gain from Liberal		Swing		

He did not stand for parliament again.

== Sources ==
- Who Was Who
- British parliamentary election results 1885–1918, Craig, F. W. S.

Parliament of the United Kingdom
Preceded by Leslie Renton	Member of Parliament for Gainsborough; January 1910–1918	Succeeded by John Elsdale Molson
