= George Peel =

Economist (1869–1956)

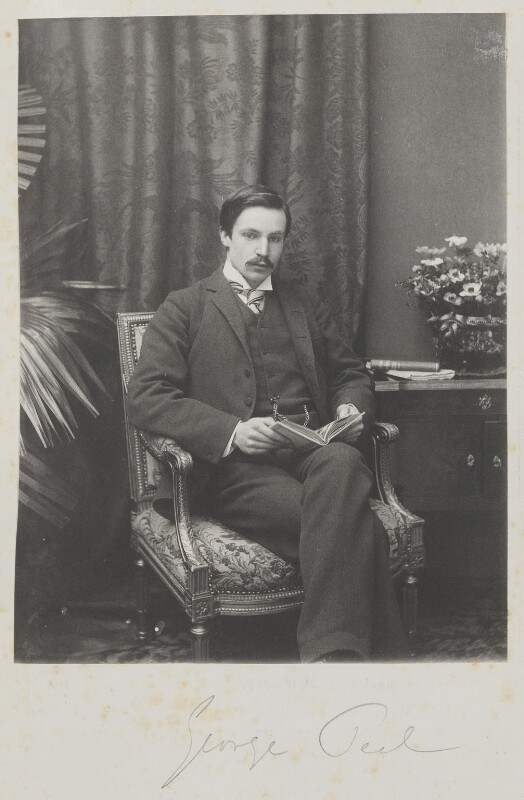
George Peel, photograph c.1890

Major Arthur George Villiers Peel (27 February 1869 – 25 April 1956) was a British Member of Parliament and a writer on politics and economics.

== Career ==
George Peel was the son of Arthur Peel, 1st Viscount Peel, a senior British Liberal politician, and Adelaide Dugdale.

On 6 October 1906, at the age of 38, Peel married Lady Agnes Lygon. He entered New College, Oxford University, in 1886 and wrote extensively on politics and economics.

Peel was elected as MP for Spalding in the by-election of 1917, serving until the constituency was abolished in 1918, and he also served as Clerk to the Treasury.

General election 1918: Holland with Boston
Party		Candidate	Votes	%	±%
	Labour	William Royce	8,788	39.8	N/A
C	Unionist	Ernest Belcher	7,718	35.0	N/A
	Liberal	George Peel	5,557	25.2	N/A
Majority			1,070	4.8	N/A
Turnout			22,063	55.2	N/A
Registered electors			40,004		
	Labour win (new seat)				
C indicates candidate endorsed by the coalition government.

Peel died aged 88 on 25 April 1956.

== Bibliography ==
He authored or edited many publications, normally under the name George Peel, or abbreviated "G.P." or "G.V.P.":

- Sir Robert Peel, from his private papers, Edited for his trustees by C S Parker; With a chapter on his life and character by his grandson, the Hon George Peel, John Murray, 1899
- The Enemies of England, Edward Arnold, 1902
- The Friends of England, Murray, 1905
- The Future of England, Macmillan & Co., 1911
- The Tariff Reformers, Methuen & Co., 1913
- The Reign of Sir Edward Carson, P. S. King & Son, 1914
- The Private letters of Sir Robert Peel, Edited by George Peel, John Murray, 1920
- The Economic Impact of America, Macmillan & Co., 1928
- The Economic Policy of France, Macmillan & Co., 1937
- The Work of Sir Robert Peel and its lessons for to-day, Cobden-Sanderson, 1938
- The War: the root and the remedy, England, 1941
- The Fiscal Policy of Europe, London, 1946
- Imperial Preference, 1894-1945, London, 1945
- How Free Trade Will Come Free Trade Union Pamphlets, London, 1947

He contributed several biographies to the Dictionary of National Biography, including those for:

- Peel, Robert (1750–1830)
- Peel, Robert (1788–1850)
- Campbell, George Douglas

Parliament of the United Kingdom
Preceded by Francis McLaren	Member of Parliament for Spalding; 1917–1918	Succeeded by Constituency abolished
