= Gainsborough (constituency) =

Parliamentary constituency in the United Kingdom, 1997 onwards

Coordinates: 53.35°N 0.50°W

- County constituency for the House of Commons
- Interactive map of boundaries since 2024
- Location within the East Midlands
- County: Lincolnshire
- Electorate: 74,750 (March 2020)
- Major settlements: Market Rasen, Caistor, and Gainsborough

Current constituency
- Created: 1997
- Member of Parliament: Sir Edward Leigh (Conservative)
- Seats: One
- Created from: Gainsborough and Horncastle

1885–1983
- Seats: One
- Created from: North Lincolnshire
- Replaced by: Gainsborough and Horncastle and Boothferry

Gainsborough is a constituency (Note: A county constituency (for the purposes of election expenses and type of returning officer)) in Lincolnshire represented in the House of Commons of the UK Parliament since 1983 by Sir Edward Leigh of the Conservative Party, who, since the 2024 general election, is the Father of the House. (Note: As with all constituencies, the constituency elects one Member of Parliament (MP) by the first past the post system of election at least every five years.) The constituency is named for its largest town of Gainsborough, on the western edge of the constituency.

== Constituency profile ==
Gainsborough is a constituency located in Lincolnshire and is coterminous with the local government district of West Lindsey. It covers a large rural area north of the city of Lincoln. Its largest settlement is the market town of Gainsborough, which has a population of around 21,000. The town has a history of industry, particularly ironworking, and currently falls within the top 10% most-deprived areas in England. Other settlements in the constituency include the small towns of Market Rasen and Caistor and the villages of Saxilby, Nettleham, Welton and Scotter. The rural areas are agricultural and generally wealthier than Gainsborough. House prices in the constituency are lower than the rest of the East Midlands and considerably lower than the national average.

In general, residents of the constituency are older and more religious than the rest of the country. Levels of education, wealth and professional employment are similar to national averages. White people made up 97% of the population at the 2021 census. At the local council level, Gainsborough and Market Rasen are mostly represented by Liberal Democrats whilst the rest of the constituency elected predominantly Conservatives (to the district council) or Reform UK (to the county council). Voters strongly supported leaving the European Union in the 2016 referendum with an estimated 62% voting in favour of Brexit compared to 52% nationwide.

== History ==
The constituency was created under the Redistribution of Seats Act 1885 that year, which lasted until it was reformed as Gainsborough and Horncastle on a boundary change for the 1983 election. That seat lasted until 1997, as from the mid-1990s population changes led to removal of Horncastle from the seat and recreation of the old seat with largely similar boundaries. The seat has elected Conservative MPs since 1924 and is a stronghold, as well as giving its MPs very long tenures, having been represented by only three people since 1924.

== Boundaries ==
=== Historic ===
1885–1918: The Municipal Borough of Lincoln, the Sessional Divisions of Epworth, Gainsborough, Lincoln, and the parish of Bracebridge.

1918–1950: The Urban Districts of Crowle and Gainsborough, and the Rural Districts of Gainsborough, Isle of Axholme, and Welton.

1950–1983: The Urban Districts of Gainsborough and Market Rasen, and the Rural Districts of Caistor, Gainsborough, Isle of Axholme, and Welton.

Constituency was abolished in 1983 and re-established in 1997

1997–2010: The District of West Lindsey, and the District of East Lindsey wards of Binbrook and Wragby.

2010–2024: The District of West Lindsey, and the District of East Lindsey ward of Wragby.

=== Current ===
Further to the 2023 review of Westminster constituencies, which came into effect for the 2024 general election, the constituency comprises the District of West Lindsey. The East Lindsey ward of Wragby was transferred to Louth and Horncastle.

== Members of Parliament ==
=== MPs 1885–1983 ===
North Lincolnshire prior to 1885

Year	Member	Party
1885	Joseph Bennett	Liberal
1886	Henry Eyre	Conservative
1892	Joseph Bennett	Liberal
1895	Emerson Bainbridge	Liberal
1900	Seymour Fitzroy Ormsby-Gore	Conservative
1906	Leslie Renton	Liberal
1907	Leslie Renton	Liberal Unionist
1910	George Jackson Bentham	Liberal
1918	John Molson	Unionist
1923	Richard Winfrey	Liberal
1924	Harry Crookshank	Conservative
1956 by-election	Marcus Kimball	Conservative
1983	constituency abolished	

=== MPs since 1997 ===
Gainsborough and Horncastle prior to 1997

Year	Member	Party
1997	Sir Edward Leigh	Conservative

== Elections ==
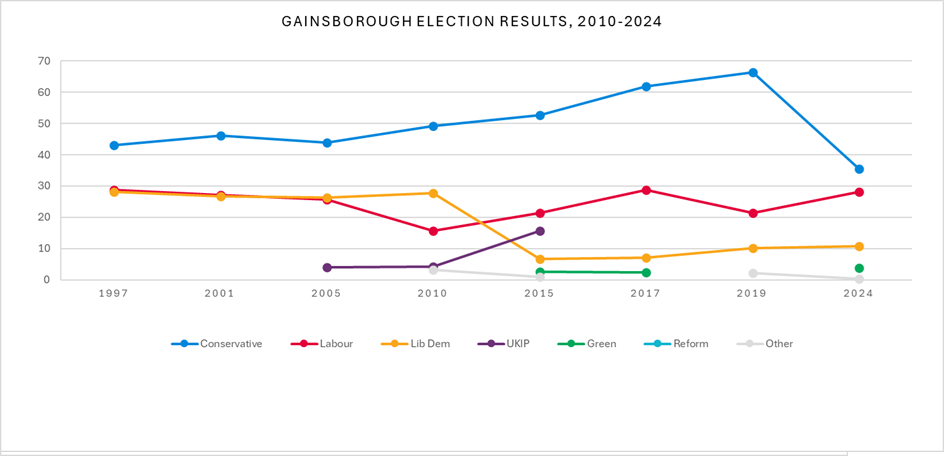
Gainsborough election results 1997–2024

=== Elections in the 2020s ===
General election 2024: Gainsborough
Party	Candidate	Votes	%	±%
Conservative	Edward Leigh	16,636	35.6	−30.7
Labour	Jess McGuire	13,104	28.1	+6.9
Reform	Pat O'Connor	9,916	21.2	New
Liberal Democrats	Lesley Rollings	5,001	10.7	+0.3
Green	Vanessa Smith	1,832	3.9	New
SDP	Tim Mellors	196	0.4	New
Majority		3,532	7.6	−37.4
Turnout		46,685	61.8	−5.1
Registered electors		75,836		
Conservative hold		Swing	−18.8	

=== Elections in the 2010s ===
General election 2019: Gainsborough
Party	Candidate	Votes	%	±%
Conservative	Edward Leigh	33,893	66.4	+4.6
Labour	Perry Smith	10,926	21.4	−7.3
Liberal Democrats	Lesley Rollings	5,157	10.1	+3.0
Independent	Mary Cavill	1,070	2.1	New
Majority		22,967	45.0	+11.9
Turnout		51,046	66.9	−1.1
Conservative hold		Swing	+5.95	

General election 2017: Gainsborough
Party	Candidate	Votes	%	±%
Conservative	Edward Leigh	31,790	61.8	+9.1
Labour	Catherine Tite	14,767	28.7	+7.4
Liberal Democrats	Lesley Rollings	3,630	7.1	+0.4
Green	Victoria Pearson	1,238	2.4	−0.2
Majority		17,023	33.1	+1.7
Turnout		51,575	68.0	+0.7
Conservative hold		Swing	+0.85	

General election 2015: Gainsborough
Party	Candidate	Votes	%	±%
Conservative	Edward Leigh	25,949	52.7	+3.4
Labour	David Prescott	10,500	21.3	+5.7
UKIP	John Saxon	7,727	15.7	+11.5
Liberal Democrats	Lesley Rollings	3,290	6.7	−21.1
Green	Geoff Barnes	1,290	2.6	New
Lincolnshire Independent	Chris Darcel	505	1.0	New
Majority		15,449	31.4	+9.9
Turnout		48,261	67.3	−1.0
Conservative hold		Swing	−1.15	

General election 2010: Gainsborough
Party	Candidate	Votes	%	±%
Conservative	Edward Leigh	24,266	49.3	+5.4
Liberal Democrats	Pat O'Connor	13,707	27.8	+1.8
Labour	Jamie McMahon	7,701	15.6	−10.5
UKIP	Steven Pearson	2,065	4.2	+0.1
BNP	Malcolm Porter	1,512	3.1	New
Majority		10,559	21.5	+4.0
Turnout		49,251	68.3	+3.6
Conservative hold		Swing	+1.8	

=== Elections in the 2000s ===
General election 2005: Gainsborough
Party	Candidate	Votes	%	±%
Conservative	Edward Leigh	20,040	43.9	−2.3
Liberal Democrats	Adrian Heath	12,037	26.4	−0.3
Labour	John Knight	11,744	25.7	−1.4
UKIP	Steven Pearson	1,860	4.1	New
Majority		8,003	17.5	−1.6
Turnout		45,681	64.6	+0.4
Conservative hold		Swing	−1.0	

General election 2001: Gainsborough
Party	Candidate	Votes	%	±%
Conservative	Edward Leigh	19,555	46.2	+3.1
Labour	Alan Rhodes	11,484	27.1	−1.7
Liberal Democrats	Steve Taylor	11,280	26.7	−1.4
Majority		8,071	19.1	+4.8
Turnout		42,319	64.2	−10.4
Conservative hold		Swing	+2.4	

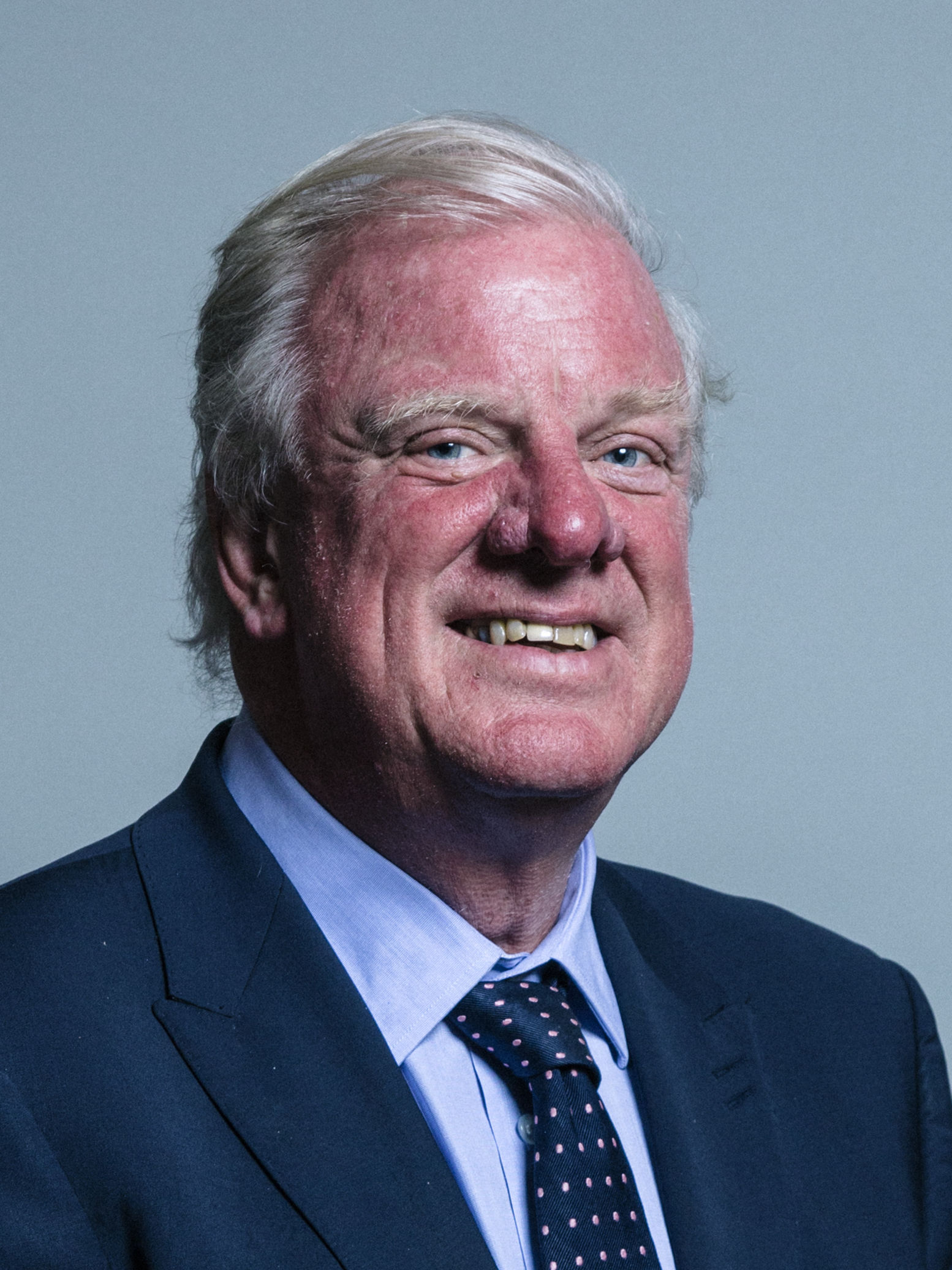
Sir Edward Leigh

=== Elections in the 1990s ===
General election 1997: Gainsborough
Party	Candidate	Votes	%	±%
Conservative	Edward Leigh	20,593	43.1	
Labour	Paul Taylor	13,767	28.8	
Liberal Democrats	Neil Taylor	13,436	28.1	−1.5
Majority		6,826	14.3	
Turnout		47,796	74.6	
Conservative win (new seat)				

== Election results 1885–1979 ==
=== Elections in the 1880s ===
General election 1885: Gainsborough
Party	Candidate	Votes	%	±%
Liberal	Joseph Bennett	4,955	56.3	
Conservative	Charles Alexander Sim	3,850	43.7	
Majority		1,105	12.6	
Turnout		8,805	79.3	
Registered electors		11,107		
Liberal win (new seat)				

General election 1886: Gainsborough
Party	Candidate	Votes	%	±%
Conservative	Henry Eyre	4,123	50.5	+6.8
Liberal	Joseph Bennett	4,038	49.5	−6.8
Majority		85	1.0	N/A
Turnout		8,161	73.5	−5.8
Registered electors		11,107		
Conservative gain from Liberal		Swing	+6.8	

=== Elections in the 1890s ===
General election 1892: Gainsborough
Party	Candidate	Votes	%	±%
Liberal	Joseph Bennett	4,945	55.1	+5.6
Conservative	Henry Eyre	4,037	44.9	−5.6
Majority		908	10.2	N/A
Turnout		8,982	77.8	+4.3
Registered electors		11,546		
Liberal gain from Conservative		Swing	+5.6	

Emerson Bainbridge

General election 1895: Gainsborough
Party	Candidate	Votes	%	±%
Liberal	Emerson Bainbridge	5,077	54.1	−1.0
Conservative	Edward Pearson	4,301	45.9	+1.0
Majority		776	8.2	−2.0
Turnout		9,378	71.8	−6.0
Registered electors		13,057		
Liberal hold		Swing	−1.0	

=== Elections in the 1900s ===
General election 1900: Gainsborough
Party	Candidate	Votes	%	±%
Conservative	Seymour Fitzroy Ormsby-Gore	4,661	50.2	+4.3
Liberal	Emerson Bainbridge	4,624	49.8	−4.3
Majority		37	0.4	N/A
Turnout		9,285	75.3	+3.5
Registered electors		12,328		
Conservative gain from Liberal		Swing	+4.3	

Leslie Renton

General election 1906: Gainsborough
Party	Candidate	Votes	%	±%
Liberal	Leslie Renton	5,922	53.9	+4.1
Conservative	Charles Algernon Moreing	5,071	46.1	−4.1
Majority		851	7.8	N/A
Turnout		10,993	88.9	+13.6
Registered electors		12,370		
Liberal gain from Conservative		Swing	+4.1	

=== Elections in the 1910s ===
General election January 1910: Gainsborough
Party	Candidate	Votes	%	±%
Liberal	George Jackson Bentham	6,178	52.2	−1.7
Conservative	Robert Henderson	5,663	47.8	+1.7
Majority		515	4.4	−3.4
Turnout		11,841	89.9	+1.0
Liberal hold		Swing	−1.7	

General election December 1910: Gainsborough
Party	Candidate	Votes	%	±%
Liberal	George Jackson Bentham	5,825	50.3	−1.9
Conservative	Archibald Weigall	5,745	49.7	+1.9
Majority		80	0.6	−3.8
Turnout		11,570	87.9	−2.0
Liberal hold		Swing	−1.9	

General Election 1914–15:

Another General Election was required to take place before the end of 1915. The political parties had been making preparations for an election to take place and by July 1914, the following candidates had been selected;

- Liberal: George Jackson Bentham
- Unionist: John Molson

General election 1918: Gainsborough
Party		Candidate	Votes	%	±%
C	Unionist	John Molson	8,634	56.8	+7.1
	Liberal	George Jackson Bentham	6,556	43.2	−7.1
Majority			2,078	13.6	N/A
Turnout			15,190	55.2	−32.7
Registered electors			27,503		
	Unionist gain from Liberal		Swing	+7.1	
C indicates candidate endorsed by the coalition government.

=== Elections in the 1920s ===
General election 1922: Gainsborough
Party	Candidate	Votes	%	±%
Unionist	John Molson	9,015	42.7	−14.1
Liberal	Joel Seaverns	7,216	34.2	−9.0
Labour	James Read	4,884	23.1	New
Majority		1,799	8.5	−5.1
Turnout		21,115	77.6	+22.4
Registered electors		27,219		
Unionist hold		Swing	−2.6	

Richard Winfrey

General election 1923: Gainsborough
Party	Candidate	Votes	%	±%
Liberal	Richard Winfrey	9,694	47.1	+12.9
Unionist	John Molson	7,841	38.1	−4.6
Labour	James Read	3,039	14.8	−8.3
Majority		1,853	9.0	N/A
Turnout		20,574	75.4	−2.2
Registered electors		27,294		
Liberal gain from Unionist		Swing	+8.8	

General election 1924: Gainsborough
Party	Candidate	Votes	%	±%
Unionist	Harry Crookshank	10,281	47.1	+9.0
Labour	F J Knowles	5,958	27.3	+12.5
Liberal	Richard Winfrey	5,590	25.6	−21.5
Majority		4,323	19.8	N/A
Turnout		21,829	79.0	+3.6
Registered electors		27,619		
Unionist gain from Liberal		Swing	−1.8	

Arthur Neal

General election 1929: Gainsborough
Party	Candidate	Votes	%	±%
Unionist	Harry Crookshank	10,058	37.1	−10.0
Liberal	Arthur Neal	9,991	36.9	+11.3
Labour	George Deer	7,032	26.0	−1.3
Majority		67	0.2	−19.6
Turnout		27,081	79.7	−0.7
Registered electors		33,977		
Unionist hold		Swing	−10.7	

=== Election in the 1930s ===
Henry Purchase

General election 1931: Gainsborough
Party	Candidate	Votes	%	±%
Conservative	Harry Crookshank	14,839	51.7	+14.6
Liberal	Henry Purchase	8,009	27.9	−9.0
Labour	George Deer	5,856	20.4	−5.6
Majority		6,830	23.8	+23.6
Turnout		28,704	83.2	+3.5
Conservative hold		Swing		

General election 1935: Gainsborough
Party	Candidate	Votes	%	±%
Conservative	Harry Crookshank	12,597	44.8	−6.9
Liberal	John Johnson Till Ferens	10,840	38.5	+10.6
Labour	E Pittwood	4,698	16.7	−3.7
Majority		1,757	6.3	−17.5
Turnout		28,135	80.4	−2.8
Conservative hold		Swing		

General Election 1939–40:

Another general election was required to take place before the end of 1940. The political parties had been making preparations for an election to take place from 1939 and by the end of this year, the following candidates had been selected;

- Conservative: Harry Crookshank,
- Liberal: Margaret Wintringham

=== Election in the 1940s ===
General election 1945: Gainsborough
Party	Candidate	Votes	%	±%
Conservative	Harry Crookshank	11,081	38.5	−6.3
Labour	Gerald Samson Saville	9,436	32.8	+16.1
Liberal	Roy Desmond Robinson	8,284	28.8	−9.7
Majority		1,645	5.7	−0.6
Turnout		28,801	75.2	−5.2
Conservative hold		Swing		

=== Elections in the 1950s ===
General election 1950: Gainsborough
Party	Candidate	Votes	%	±%
Conservative	Harry Crookshank	17,066	41.4	
Labour	Gerald Samson Saville	14,890	36.1	
Liberal	Henry Ivan Spence	9,276	22.5	
Majority		2,176	5.3	
Turnout		41,232	83.5	
Conservative hold		Swing		

General election 1951: Gainsborough
Party	Candidate	Votes	%	±%
Conservative	Harry Crookshank	19,915	49.1	+7.7
Labour	Gordon RS Hawkins	16,074	39.6	+3.5
Liberal	John Gregory	4,580	11.3	−11.2
Majority		3,841	9.5	+4.2
Turnout		40,569	80.1	−3.4
Conservative hold		Swing		

General election 1955: Gainsborough
Party	Candidate	Votes	%	±%
Conservative	Harry Crookshank	22,576	55.8	+6.7
Labour	Gordon RS Hawkins	17,107	44.2	+4.6
Majority		4,469	11.6	+2.1
Turnout		39,683	76.8	−3.3
Conservative hold		Swing		

1956 Gainsborough by-election
Party	Candidate	Votes	%	±%
Conservative	Marcus Kimball	12,836	40.8	−15.0
Labour	Henry Walston	11,830	37.6	−6.6
Liberal	Henry Ivan Spence	6,806	21.6	New
Majority		1,006	3.2	−8.4
Turnout		31,472		
Conservative hold		Swing		

General election 1959: Gainsborough
Party	Candidate	Votes	%	±%
Conservative	Marcus Kimball	20,056	49.6	−6.2
Labour	Henry Walston	13,247	32.8	−11.4
Liberal	Roy Douglas	7,147	17.7	N/A
Majority		6,809	16.8	+5.2
Turnout		40,450	80.8	+4.0
Conservative hold		Swing		

=== Elections in the 1960s ===
General election 1964: Gainsborough
Party	Candidate	Votes	%	±%
Conservative	Marcus Kimball	19,235	47.7	−1.9
Labour	Douglas Poirier	12,126	30.1	−2.7
Liberal	Roy Douglas	8,930	22.2	+4.5
Majority		7,109	17.6	+0.8
Turnout		40,291	78.2	−2.6
Conservative hold		Swing		

General election 1966: Gainsborough
Party	Candidate	Votes	%	±%
Conservative	Marcus Kimball	18,770	47.2	−0.5
Labour	Alan Day	14,904	37.5	+7.4
Liberal	Geoffrey R S Stevenson	6,064	15.3	−6.9
Majority		3,866	9.7	−7.9
Turnout		39,738	75.8	−2.4
Conservative hold		Swing	+3.95	

=== Elections in the 1970s ===
General election 1970: Gainsborough
Party	Candidate	Votes	%	±%
Conservative	Marcus Kimball	22,163	50.2	+3.0
Labour	Maurice P Tracy	14,454	32.7	−4.8
Liberal	Roger Blackmore	7,543	17.1	+1.8
Majority		7,709	17.5	+7.8
Turnout		44,163	74.6	−1.2
Conservative hold		Swing		

General election February 1974: Gainsborough
Party	Candidate	Votes	%	±%
Conservative	Marcus Kimball	22,177	44.2	−6.0
Liberal	Roger Blackmore	15,967	31.8	+14.7
Labour	Terry J Lansbury	12,011	24.0	−8.7
Majority		6,210	12.4	−5.1
Turnout		50,155	82.0	+7.4
Conservative hold		Swing		

General election October 1974: Gainsborough
Party	Candidate	Votes	%	±%
Conservative	Marcus Kimball	19,163	41.5	−2.7
Liberal	Roger Blackmore	15,195	32.9	+1.1
Labour	Terry J Lansbury	11,797	25.6	+1.6
Majority		3,968	8.6	−3.8
Turnout		46,155	74.8	−7.2
Conservative hold		Swing		

General election 1979: Gainsborough
Party	Candidate	Votes	%	±%
Conservative	Marcus Kimball	24,040	46.4	+4.9
Liberal	Roger Blackmore	16,885	32.6	−0.3
Labour	Willy Bach	10,335	20.0	−5.6
Ind. Conservative	R E August	570	1.1	New
Majority		7,155	13.8	+5.2
Turnout		51,830	79.0	+4.2
Conservative hold		Swing		

=== Election results following boundary changes ===
For 1983 – 1992, see Gainsborough and Horncastle (UK Parliament constituency)

== See also ==
- List of parliamentary constituencies in Lincolnshire
- The town of Gainsborough, Lincolnshire

== Sources ==
- Craig, F W S (1983) [1969]. British parliamentary election results 1918–1949 (3rd ed.). Chichester: Parliamentary Research Services. ISBN 0-900178-06-X.
- Leigh Rayment's Historical List of MPs – Constituencies beginning with "G" (part 1)

Parliament of the United Kingdom
Preceded by Worthing West	Constituency represented by the father of the House; 2024–	Incumbent
