= Emerson Bainbridge =

English mining consulting engineer and politician

Bainbridge in 1895.

Emerson Muschamp Bainbridge (5 December 1845 – 12 May 1911) was an English consulting mining engineer, philanthropist and Liberal Party politician who sat in the House of Commons from 1895 to 1900.

== Life ==
Bainbridge was born in the village of Eastgate, the fourth son of Emerson Muschamp Bainbridge (1817–1892). He was educated first at Edenfield School, Doncaster, then at Wesley College, Sheffield, and at Durham University. He was articled in mining engineering with the Marquess of Londonderry in Durham College. In 1870 he became manager of the Sheffield and Tinsley Collieries, and soon afterwards he was in charge of the Nunnery Colliery on behalf of the Duke of Norfolk. This became a limited company in 1874, and he then became managing director with a controlling interest. In 1873 he was awarded the Hermon Prize for an essay on the prevention of mine explosions. He was head of a noted firm of mining consulting engineers. In 1889 Bainbridge, obtained a lease from the Duke of Portland for the Tophard or Barnsley coal, under areas of land in Derbyshire and Nottinghamshire. He then founded the Bolsover Colliery Company to take over the lease, and to mine the coal. He was entirely responsible for the development of Bolsover with regard to both the colliery and the New Bolsover model village. Bainbridge was also interested in local railways, and held many directorships including the Lancashire, Derbyshire and East Coast Railway of which he was Chairman of the Board, the Sheffield District Railway, Hardy Patent Pick Co., New Hucknall Colliery, Yorkshire Engine Co. and Wharncliffe Silkstone Colliery. He was a great supporter of the project for an East to West railway from Sutton-on-Sea to Liverpool, of which only the eastern portion was completed. He also supported the Sheffield Canal, and in 1889 lectured in the town on the possibility of bringing large vessels up the canal into Sheffield.

Bainbridge was known as a philanthropist. He provided money for the YMCA scheme in Sheffield, leading to the establishment of the Association Buildings Co. Ltd. and the headquarters buildings. In 1881 he entertained all the members at Chatsworth. He built and founded the Jeffie Bainbridge Home for Waifs and Strays at the corner of Norfolk Street and Surrey Street in Sheffield in memory of his wife; the building was opened by the Duke and Duchess of Portland.

At the 1895 general election Bainbridge was elected as Member of Parliament for Gainsborough, but he lost the seat in 1900.

Bainbridge was a fine shot and a notable sportsman. He owned a large deer forest at Achnashellach in Ross-shire, of 40,000 acres (160 km^{2}), with many red deer. In 1905 he built a villa, Roquebrune, between Menton and Monte Carlo, as a potential home for his later years. However he made little use of it before his death at the age of 65.

=== Family ===
Bainbridge married Eliza Jefferson Armstrong at St. John`s Church, Broughton, Lancashire on 9 April 1874. Eliza`s sister, Margaret, had married Emerson`s eldest brother Cuthbert in 1862. Eliza died in January 1892. Bainbridge was married a second time on 20 July 1898, to Norah Mossom Merryweather. His youngest daughter by his first marriage, Eva Jeffie Bainbridge, married Brigadier General William Darell. Another daughter, Patricia Merryweather Bainbridge, married Willoughby Norrie, 1st Baron Norrie on 28 November 1938.

Parliament of the United Kingdom
Preceded by Joseph Bennett	Member of Parliament for Gainsborough; 1895 – 1900	Succeeded by Seymour Fitzroy Ormsby-Gore
