= Holland with Boston =

Parliamentary constituency in the United Kingdom, 1918–1997

- Former county constituency for the House of Commons
- County: Lincolnshire

1918–1997
- Seats: One
- Created from: Boston, Spalding
- Replaced by: Boston and Skegness and South Holland and the Deepings

Holland with Boston was a county constituency represented in the House of Commons of the Parliament of the United Kingdom from 1918 to 1997. It elected one Member of Parliament (MP) by the first past the post system of election.

== History ==
The constituency was created in 1918 and abolished in 1997. By the time of its abolition, it was a safe Conservative seat. However, Holland with Boston had been held by both the Liberal and Labour parties before the Second World War.

From 1885 to 1918 the parliamentary borough of Boston returned one MP, while the Lincolnshire county division of Spalding, in the south-east of the historic county, elected another MP. In 1918 these two seats were merged to form this constituency.

When created in 1918 the constituency had the same boundaries as the traditional sub-division of the historic county known as the Parts of Holland, which had become an administrative county in 1889.

In 1997 the constituency was abolished and replaced by two new constituencies, Boston and Skegness and South Holland and The Deepings.

== Boundaries ==
1918–1974: The county of the Parts of Holland.

1974–1983: The Municipal Borough of Boston, the Urban District of Spalding, and the Rural Districts of Boston, East Elloe, and Spalding.

1983–1997: The Borough of Boston, and the District of South Holland wards of Donington, Fleet, Gedney, Holbeach Hurn, Holbeach St John, Holbeach Town, Long Sutton, Moulton, Sutton Bridge, The Saints, and Whaplode.

== Members of Parliament ==
Election	Member	Party
1918	William Royce	Labour
1924 by-election	Arthur Dean	Conservative
1929 by-election	Sir James Blindell	Liberal
1931	Sir James Blindell	National Liberal
1937 by-election	Sir Herbert Butcher	National Liberal
1950	Sir Herbert Butcher	National Liberal & Conservative
1966	Sir Richard Body	Conservative
1997	constituency abolished: see Boston and Skegness and South Holland and the Deepings	

== Election results ==
=== Elections in the 1910s ===
General election 1918: Holland with Boston
Party		Candidate	Votes	%	±%
	Labour	William Royce	8,788	39.8	
C	Unionist	Ernest Belcher	7,718	35.0	
	Liberal	George Peel	5,557	25.2	
Majority			1,070	4.8	
Turnout			22,063	55.2	
Registered electors			40,004		
	Labour win (new seat)				
C indicates candidate endorsed by the coalition government.

=== Elections in the 1920s ===
General election 1922: Holland with Boston
Party	Candidate	Votes	%	±%
Labour	William Royce	12,489	39.1	−0.7
Unionist	Henry Cameron-Ramsay-Fairfax-Lucy	11,898	37.3	+2.3
Liberal	Ewan Siegfried Agnew	7,535	23.6	−1.6
Majority		591	1.8	−3.0
Turnout		31,922	76.9	+21.7
Registered electors		41,516		
Labour hold		Swing	−1.5	

General election 1923: Holland with Boston
Party	Candidate	Votes	%	±%
Labour	William Royce	15,697	54.1	+15.0
Unionist	Arthur Dean	13,331	45.9	+8.6
Majority		2,366	8.2	+6.4
Turnout		29,028	68.8	−8.1
Registered electors		42,220		
Labour hold		Swing	+3.2	

1924 Holland with Boston by-election
Party	Candidate	Votes	%	±%
Unionist	Arthur Dean	12,907	39.6	−6.3
Labour	Hugh Dalton	12,101	37.1	−17.0
Liberal	Richard Pattinson Winfrey	7,596	23.3	New
Majority		806	2.5	N/A
Turnout		32,604	77.2	+8.4
Registered electors		42,220		
Unionist gain from Labour		Swing	−5.4	

General election 1924: Holland with Boston
Party	Candidate	Votes	%	±%
Unionist	Arthur Dean	15,459	47.5	+1.6
Labour	G. R. Blanco White	10,689	32.8	−21.3
Liberal	Richard Pattinson Winfrey	6,413	19.7	N/A
Majority		4,770	14.7	N/A
Turnout		32,561	75.8	+7.0
Registered electors		42,929		
Unionist gain from Labour		Swing	+11.5	

1929 Holland with Boston by-election
Party	Candidate	Votes	%	±%
Liberal	James Blindell	13,000	38.1	+18.4
Labour	G. R. Blanco White	9,294	27.3	−5.5
Unionist	Frederick Van den Berg	8,257	24.2	−23.3
Agricultural Party	F.W. Dennis	3,541	10.4	New
Majority		3,706	10.8	N/A
Turnout		34,092	75.6	−0.2
Registered electors		45,079		
Liberal gain from Unionist		Swing	+15.9	

General election 1929: Holland with Boston
Party	Candidate	Votes	%	±%
Liberal	James Blindell	19,792	43.8	+24.1
Unionist	Frederick Van den Berg	15,877	35.1	−12.4
Labour	Charles Edward Snook	9,556	21.1	−11.7
Majority		3,915	8.7	N/A
Turnout		45,225	81.5	+5.7
Registered electors		55,522		
Liberal gain from Unionist		Swing	+18.3	

=== Elections in the 1930s ===
General election 1931: Holland with Boston
Party	Candidate	Votes	%	±%
National Liberal	James Blindell	30,375	77.5	+42.4
Labour	John Parker	8,840	22.5	+1.4
Majority		21,535	55.0	+46.3
Turnout		39,215	68.5	−13.0
National Liberal hold		Swing		

General election 1935: Holland with Boston
Party	Candidate	Votes	%	±%
National Liberal	James Blindell	25,162	65.5	−12.0
Labour	Ernest E. Reynolds	13,264	34.5	+12.0
Majority		11,898	31.0	−24.0
Turnout		38,426	63.6	−4.9
National Liberal hold		Swing		

1937 Holland with Boston by-election
Party	Candidate	Votes	%	±%
National Liberal	Herbert Butcher	21,846	60.0	−5.5
Labour	Ernest E. Reynolds	14,556	40.0	+5.5
Majority		7,290	20.0	−11.0
Turnout		36,396	59.4	−4.2
National Liberal hold		Swing	−5.5	

General Election 1939–40

Another General Election was required to take place before the end of 1940. The political parties had been making preparations for an election to take place and by the Autumn of 1939, the following candidates had been selected;

- Liberal National: Herbert Butcher
- Labour: E Kennedy
- British Union: Sylvia Morris

=== Elections in the 1940s ===
General election 1945: Holland with Boston
Party	Candidate	Votes	%	±%
National Liberal	Herbert Butcher	26,939	55.9	−4.1
Labour	Arthur E. Monks	21,263	44.1	+4.1
Majority		5,676	11.8	−8.2
Turnout		48,202	72.9	+13.5
National Liberal hold		Swing		

=== Elections in the 1950s ===
General election 1950: Holland with Boston
Party	Candidate	Votes	%	±%
National Liberal	Herbert Butcher	30,336	53.9	−2.0
Labour	Horace W. Lee	22,374	39.8	−2.3
Liberal	Raymond D Blankley	3,500	6.2	New
Majority		7,962	14.1	+2.3
Turnout		68,411	82.1	+9.2
National Liberal hold		Swing		

General election 1951: Holland with Boston
Party	Candidate	Votes	%	±%
National Liberal	Herbert Butcher	31,683	57.9	+4.0
Labour	Janet A Walters	22,994	42.0	+2.2
Majority		8,689	15.9	+1.8
Turnout		69,453	78.7	−3.4
National Liberal hold		Swing		

General election 1955: Holland with Boston
Party	Candidate	Votes	%	±%
National Liberal	Herbert Butcher	28,412	53.2	−4.7
Labour	William A Rippon	19,329	39.8	−2.2
Liberal	Cyril Valentine	5,581	7.0	New
Majority		9,083	13.4	−2.5
Turnout		70,040	76.1	−2.6
National Liberal hold		Swing		

General election 1959: Holland with Boston
Party	Candidate	Votes	%	±%
National Liberal	Herbert Butcher	29,013	53.5	+0.3
Labour	John DT Williamson	17,839	32.9	−6.9
Liberal	Cyril Valentine	7,334	13.5	+6.5
Majority		11,174	20.6	+6.2
Turnout		70,588	76.7	+0.6
National Liberal hold		Swing		

=== Elections in the 1960s ===
General election 1964: Holland with Boston
Party	Candidate	Votes	%	±%
National Liberal	Herbert Butcher	29,082	55.3	+1.8
Labour	Walter Long	23,451	44.6	+11.7
Majority		5,631	10.7	−9.9
Turnout		71,064	73.9	−2.8
National Liberal hold		Swing		

General election 1966: Holland with Boston
Party	Candidate	Votes	%	±%
Conservative	Richard Body	26,683	50.3	−5.0
Labour	Robert H. Hickman	26,367	49.7	+5.1
Majority		316	0.6	−10.1
Turnout		53,050	74.9	+1.0
Conservative hold		Swing		

=== Elections in the 1970s ===
General election 1970: Holland with Boston
Party	Candidate	Votes	%	±%
Conservative	Richard Body	33,580	58.0	+7.7
Labour	Robert N.H. Sackur	24,241	41.9	−7.8
Majority		9,339	16.1	+15.5
Turnout		77,245	74.8	−0.1
Conservative hold		Swing		

General election February 1974: Holland with Boston
Party	Candidate	Votes	%	±%
Conservative	Richard Body	30,561	47.6	−10.4
Labour	M Cornish	18,180	28.3	−13.6
Liberal	Raymond Stephenson	15,466	24.0	New
Majority		12,381	19.3	+3.2
Turnout		79,775	80.4	+5.6
Conservative hold		Swing		

General election October 1974: Holland with Boston
Party	Candidate	Votes	%	±%
Conservative	Richard Body	28,145	47.6	0.0
Labour	M Cornish	19,461	33.5	+5.2
Liberal	Raymond Stephenson	10,476	18.0	−6.0
Majority		8,684	14.9	−4.4
Turnout		80,454	72.1	−8.3
Conservative hold		Swing		

General election 1979: Holland with Boston
Party	Candidate	Votes	%	±%
Conservative	Richard Body	35,440	55.5	+7.9
Labour	Malcolm Fox	17,908	28.0	−5.5
Liberal	J Wright	10,480	16.4	−1.6
Majority		17,532	27.5	+12.6
Turnout		85,578	74.5	+2.4
Conservative hold		Swing		

=== Elections in the 1980s ===
General election 1983: Holland with Boston
Party	Candidate	Votes	%	±%
Conservative	Richard Body	24,962	55.2	−0.3
Liberal	Carole Le Brun	13,226	29.2	+12.8
Labour	John Moore	6,970	15.4	−12.6
Majority		11,736	26.0	−1.5
Turnout		63,562	71.0	−3.5
Conservative hold		Swing		

General election 1987: Holland with Boston
Party	Candidate	Votes	%	±%
Conservative	Richard Body	27,412	57.8	+2.6
Liberal	Carole Le Brun	9,817	20.7	−8.5
Labour	John Hough	9,734	20.4	+5.0
Independent	David James	405	0.8	New
Majority		17,595	37.1	+11.1
Turnout		65,539	72.2	+1.2
Conservative hold		Swing		

=== Elections in the 1990s ===
General election 1992: Holland with Boston
Party	Candidate	Votes	%	±%
Conservative	Richard Body	29,159	55.1	−2.7
Labour	John Hough	15,328	29.0	+8.6
Liberal Democrats	Nigel Ley	8,434	15.9	−4.8
Majority		13,831	26.1	−11.0
Turnout		52,921	77.9	+5.7
Conservative hold		Swing	−5.6	

== See also ==
- List of parliamentary constituencies in Lincolnshire
- 1924 Holland with Boston by-election
- 1929 Holland with Boston by-election
- 1937 Holland with Boston by-election

== Sources ==
- http://www.psr.keele.ac.uk/area/uk.htm Area Studies, UK: politics, elections and government in Britain
- Boundaries of Parliamentary Constituencies 1885-1972, compiled and edited by F.W.S. Craig (Parliamentary Reference Publications 1972)
- British Parliamentary Constituencies: A Statistical Compendium, by Ivor Crewe and Anthony Fox (Faber and Faber 1984)
- Craig, F. W. S. (1983) [1969]. British parliamentary election results 1918-1949 (3rd ed.). Chichester: Parliamentary Research Services. ISBN 0-900178-06-X.
