= Richard Body =

English politician (1927–2018)

Sir Richard Body

Member of Parliament for Boston and Skegness Holland with Boston (1966-1997)
- In office 31 March 1966 – 14 May 2001
- Preceded by: Herbert Butcher
- Succeeded by: Mark Simmonds

Member of Parliament for Billericay
- In office 26 May 1955 – 18 September 1959
- Preceded by: Bernard Braine
- Succeeded by: Edward Gardner

Personal details
- Born: Richard Bernard Frank Stewart Body; 18 May 1927 Datchet, England
- Died: 26 February 2018 (aged 90) Stanford Dingley, England
- Party: Conservative (before 2004); UK Independence Party (2004–2008); English Democrats (after 2008)
- Spouse: Marion Graham (m. 1959)
- Children: 2
- Education: Inns of Court School of Law

Sir Richard Bernard Frank Stewart Body (18 May 1927 – 26 February 2018) was an English politician. He was Conservative Member of Parliament for Billericay from 1955 to 1959, for Holland with Boston from 1966 to 1997, and for Boston and Skegness from 1997 until he stood down at the 2001 general election. He was a long-standing member of the Conservative Monday Club, and came second in its 1972 election for chairman. A prominent eurosceptic, Body also served as president of the Anti-Common Market League.

== Family background and early life ==
Sir Richard was born in Datchet, then in Buckinghamshire, in 1927, the son of Bernard Richard Body and his wife, Daphne (formerly Corbett). His father was from a Berkshire family resident in Shinfield since the 1720s. Through his paternal grandmother, he was a third cousin of theatre director Val May. He attended the Reading School, and later the Inns of Court School of Law. He married the former Marion Graham in 1959, and they had a son and a daughter. Lady Body was a friend and Bletchley Park colleague of Valerie Middleton, the grandmother of Catherine, Princess of Wales. He served in the Royal Air Force towards the end of World War II.

== Career ==
Before finally gaining election at Billericay in 1955, Body had fought several elections across the country without success. He was the Conservative candidate for Deptford at the 1949 London County Council election, then Rotherham in the 1950 general election, Abertillery in a by-election that same year, and then Leek in 1951.

In January 1973, Body was an opponent of Prime Minister Edward Heath's Counter-Inflation Bill, stating that the real cause of inflation was too much government spending. Within the Tory party his doubts were shared by Enoch Powell, Ronald Bell and Nicholas Ridley, the last of whom complained that what was needed was a "proper economic policy".

Rural Buckinghamshire-born, and representing fertile South Holland, Body was an early supporter of environmental causes within the Conservative Party. Coming from a British agriculture perspective, he was highly critical of many aspects associated with the heavily subsidised agriculture associated with the Common Agricultural Policy (CAP) of the European Economic Community (EEC). His Agriculture: The Triumph and the Shame, a non-fictional agricultural book exposing, it asserted, its folly, was published in 1983, followed by Farming in the Clouds (1984). He was also critical over the use of pesticides in agriculture, and led an inquiry on the issue in 1986–87. The enquiry produced a draft report which contained 45 recommendations, mostly influenced by his support for organic farming and use of such methods on his own farms. The report was ignored by the Ministry of Agriculture, Fisheries and Food, which made no response and did not attempt to alter its own favoured methods. Between 1984 and 1993, Body (under the pseudonym "Old Muckspreader") also wrote the "Down on the Farm" column in Private Eye, in which he regularly criticised both CAP and environmental mismanagement of farms.

He was knighted in 1986.

Body was generally regarded as of the "Old Right" of the party, and often found himself at odds with the John Major government and its predecessor, including those influenced by it, who had come to dominate the parliamentary Conservative Party by the mid-1990s. He made such views clear in March 2001, shortly before he retired as an MP, writing in the parliamentary magazine The House that the rural and, specifically, the agricultural communities of Britain were the victims of major changes to the culture at Westminster in his time in the Commons, as the number of Tory MPs from landowning or farming backgrounds had declined and the number of self-made men from the suburbs on the Tory benches had increased.

In 1993, Body was tricked into believing he was speaking on the telephone with John Major by the impressionist-comedian Rory Bremner. The incident prompted Cabinet Secretary Robin Butler to warn Channel 4 head Michael Grade against any further calls for fear that state secrets could be inadvertently leaked.

In his later years as an MP, Body clearly distanced himself from an increasingly economic-rationalist and internationalist Tory party by associating himself with a number of environmentalist groups who disapproved of large national or free trade groupings and supported smaller, more "natural" and "organic" communities. He has been associated with such long-standing figures of the green movement such as Edward Goldsmith, John Seymour, and John Papworth. Unlike the vast majority of Conservative MPs, Body voted to equalise the age of consent for homosexuals, and also supported the legalisation of cannabis. He called for an English Parliament in his book England for the English, published in April 2001.

Body's fervent euroscepticism led to him being numbered amongst the rebellious "bastards" condemned by John Major in 1993. His actions regarding Europe eventually led to his resigning the Conservative whip for a temporary period. He authored multiple eurosceptic books, including A Europe of Many Circles (1990) and The Breakdown of Europe (1998) (which deliberately echoed the title of Leopold Kohr's book The Breakdown of Nations).

On 10 November 1999, Body put forward an Early day motion in support of the writer Robert Henderson, who believed that the security services had interfered with his mail and telephone line after he had written allegedly threatening letters to Prime Minister Tony Blair, his wife Cherie, and various Labour MPs. This followed an article by Henderson in Wisden Cricket Monthly in 1995 entitled "Is it in the blood?" which suggested that only "unequivocal Englishmen" should play cricket for England. Body's motion not only defended Henderson and accused Blair of interfering with Henderson's activities, but referred to "publicly reported incidents of racism within the Labour Party".

== Later life ==
Body joined the UK Independence Party in 2004, but left UKIP for the English Democrats by 2008. He was interviewed in 2012 as part of The History of Parliament's oral history project.

Body died at his home in Stanford Dingley, Berkshire, on 26 February 2018 at the age of 90.

== Books ==
- Agriculture: Triumph and the Shame (1982), Avebury
- Farming in the Clouds (1984), Temple Smith
- Red or Green for Farmers (and the Rest of Us) (1987), Broad Leys
- A Europe of Many Circles: Constructing a Wider Europe (1990), New European
- Our Food, Our Land: Why Contemporary Farming Practices Must Change, (1991) Rider
- The Breakdown of Europe: An Alternative to the European Union (1998) New European
- England for the English (2001), New European
- A Democratic Europe: The Alternative to the European Union (2006), New European

Parliament of the United Kingdom
Preceded by Bernard Braine	Member of Parliament for Billericay; 1955–1959	Succeeded by Edward Gardner
Preceded by Herbert Butcher	Member of Parliament for Holland with Boston; 1966–1997	Constituency abolished
New constituency	Member of Parliament for Boston and Skegness; 1997–2001	Succeeded by Mark Simmonds
