= Henry Eyre (British Army officer) =

Lieutenant-Colonel Henry Eyre CB, VD (4 February 1834 – 24 June 1904) was a British Army officer and Conservative Party politician.

Eyre was born the son of Rev. Charles Wasteneys Eyre, Rector of Carlton in Lindrick, Nottinghamshire and was educated at Harrow and Christ Church, Oxford. He inherited Rampton Manor from his father in 1862.

A Rifle Brigade officer, he served in the Crimean War, being present at the siege and fall of Sebastopol and wounded at the assault of the Redan. He served throughout the Indian Mutiny and was present at the taking of Lucknow, capture of Mynponee and operations in the Central India Campaign on the Ram Gunga River. He was present in the actions of Gwalior (included a mention in the despatch of Sir Hugh Rose) and the capture of Kalpi with the Camel Corps. This unit was formed from four officers and 100 men from the 2nd and 3rd Battalions Rifle Brigade. An elite unit, the officers were carefully picked due to the required level in independent command. He retired from the army in 1858.

On 13 January 1865 he was commissioned as Lieutenant-Colonel in command of the 1st Administrative Battalion of Nottinghamshire Rifle Volunteers (later the 4th (Nottinghamshire) Volunteer Battalion of the Sherwood Foresters), becoming its Honorary Colonel on 14 November 1891. He was awarded the Volunteer Decoration (VD) on 29 November 1892.

He was High Sheriff of Nottinghamshire in 1873 and was elected at the 1886 general election as the Member of Parliament (MP) for Gainsborough, with a majority of only 85 votes (1.0% of the total). He was defeated at the 1892 general election, and stood unsuccessfully in Mansfield at the 1895 general election. He was awarded a CB in 1887.

In 1893 he sold the Rampton estate by auction. He died at Lincoln in 1904. His body was cremated and his ashes interred in Rampton Churchyard.

Parliament of the United Kingdom
Preceded by Joseph Bennett	Member of Parliament for Gainsborough; 1886–1892	Succeeded by Joseph Bennett
