= Harry Frederick Pollock =

English politician (1857–1901)

Harry Frederick Pollock (1857 – 2 May 1901) was Liberal Unionist Party MP for Spalding.

Harry Pollock was the son of George Frederick Pollock, sometime King's Remembrancer and the grandson of Sir Frederick Pollock, 1st Baronet. Two younger brothers were Ernest Pollock, 1st Viscount Hanworth, Conservative MP and Master of the Rolls, and Bertram Pollock, Bishop of Norwich.

Pollock was educated at Winchester College, and qualified as a solicitor in 1878. He contested Spalding in 1892, won it in 1895, but lost it to the Liberals in 1900.

Pollock married Phyllis Julia Broome, daughter of Major-General Arthur Broome, CSI in 1880; they had two sons and one daughter.

== Sources ==
- Craig, F.W.S. British Parliamentary Election Results 1885-1918
- Whitaker's Almanack, 1893 to 1906 editions
