= James Blindell =

English politician (1884–1937)

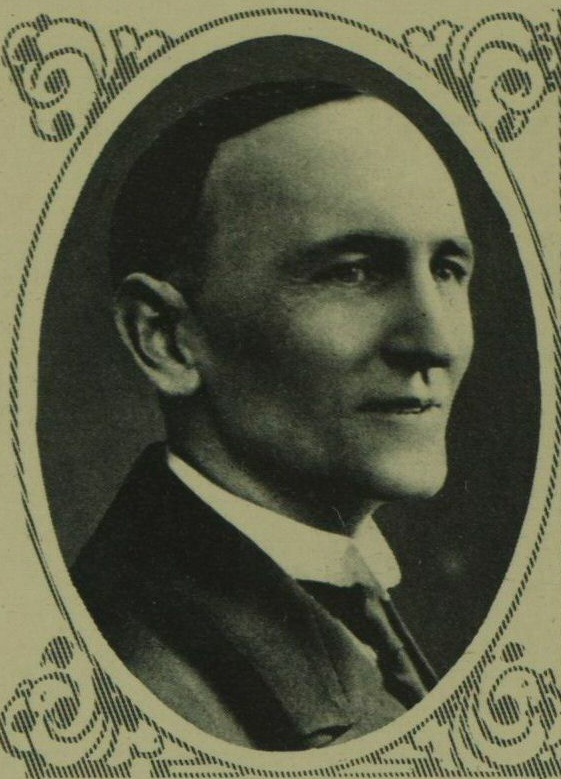
James Blindell

Sir James Blindell (1884 – 10 May 1937) was an English Liberal Party politician in the United Kingdom, who served as the Member of Parliament (MP) for Holland with Boston from 1929 until his death.

Born in Hitchin, Hertfordshire, Blindell was first elected as the constituency's MP at a by-election in March 1929, caused by the death of the Conservative MP Arthur Dean. At the time he was a councillor in Grimsby and managing director of a boot manufacturing business. Blindell overturned a Conservative majority of nearly 5,000 to win with a majority of 3,706. His victory was the last Liberal by-election gain until Torrington in 1958.

Blindell was re-elected as a Liberal at the 1929 general election, but in 1931 he was one of the Liberal MPs who broke with their party to support Ramsay MacDonald's National Government, eventually forming the Liberal National Party.

He was re-elected as a Liberal National at the 1931 general election and at the 1935 general election. In both elections, the Conservatives (who also supported the National Government) did not field a candidate against him, and he was returned with large majorities.

Blindell was knighted in 1936. He was killed in a car accident in 1937 in Stickford, near Spilsby, Lincolnshire. The car overturned when the driver swerved to avoid dogs in the road. Sir James died within five minutes of massive head injuries. Lady Blindell survived the accident with minor injuries.

At the consequent 1937 Holland with Boston by-election, Herbert Butcher held the seat for the Liberal Nationals.

Parliament of the United Kingdom
| Preceded by Arthur Dean | Member of Parliament for Holland with Boston; 1929–1937 | Succeeded by Herbert Butcher |
Political offices
| Preceded by George Davies | Lord High Treasurer; 1932–1935 | Succeeded by James Stuart |
