= Marcus Kimball =

British politician (1928–2014)

The Right Honourable The Lord Kimball

Member of the House of Lords
- Lord Temporal
- Life peerage 9 May 1985 – 26 March 2014

Member of Parliament for Gainsborough
- In office 15 February 1956 – 13 May 1983
- Preceded by: Harry Crookshank
- Succeeded by: Edward Leigh

Personal details
- Born: Marcus Richard Kimball; 18 October 1928 Marylebone, London, England
- Died: 26 March 2014 (aged 85)
- Party: Conservative
- Parent: Lawrence Kimball (father)
- Education: Eton College
- Alma mater: Trinity College, Cambridge

Marcus Richard Kimball, Baron Kimball (18 October 1928 – 26 March 2014) was a British Conservative politician.

== Early life ==
The son of Major Lawrence Kimball, he was born in Marylebone, London, and educated at Eton College and Trinity College, Cambridge. He became a farmer and a Lloyd's underwriter. He was a councillor on Rutland County Council and commanded a squadron of the Leicestershire Yeomanry.

== Political career ==
Kimball contested Derby South in 1955.

He was the Member of Parliament (MP) for Gainsborough from a 1956 by-election until 1983. While representing this constituency, he wrote to Prime Minister Margaret Thatcher, after Argentina's invasion of the Falkland Islands, that he felt the British government should "let the Argentinians have the Falklands with as little fuss as possible". This letter, apparently written without the knowledge of his constituency party, remained secret until revealed by the release of part of the Thatcher archive in 2013.

According to his obituary he treated his constituents in much the same way as he treated the tenants of his Market Harborough and Altnaharra estates advising potential MPs not to promise to hold surgeries and not to live in the constituency unless sure there was a good local hunt.

Kimball opposed separate taxation for women in 1978, saying women just gave the bill to their husbands.

Knighted in the 1981 Birthday Honours, Kimball was subsequently given a life peerage as Baron Kimball, of Easton in the County of Leicestershire on 9 May 1985.

== Hunting interests ==
A keen huntsman, Kimball was joint master of the Fitzwilliam Hunt 1952 and 1953, and the Cottesmore Hunt 1953–58. He was chairman of the British Field Sports Society 1966–82, and its President 1996–98. He was vice-president of its successor organisation, the Countryside Alliance from 1998. He indirectly gave money to an anti-field sports organisation after an Industrial Tribunal ruled that he sacked his housekeeper unfairly and she donated part of her compensation.

== Other interests ==
In March 1993, he was appointed Chairman of the British Greyhound Racing Trust, a position he held until 1996. He also held senior positions in show jumping, light horse breeding organisations and in the Royal College of Veterinary Surgeons.

== Personal life ==
He married June Mary Fenwick, the sister of his sister's husband, from Great Stukeley Hall, on 15 March 1956, at St Michael's Church in Huntingdon.

He died at the age of 85 on 26 March 2014.

== Arms ==
Coat of arms of Marcus Kimball
Coronet Coronet of a Baron Crest In front of two Arrows points downwards saltirewise Gules a Bull's Head erased Sable armed Or ducally gorged also Gules between two Branches of Laurel fructed proper Escutcheon Argent a Pale Gules charged with a Lion rampant of the field on a Chief Sable a Bezant between two Crescents Or Supporters On either side a Wild Turkey proper Motto Strive for the gain of all

Parliament of the United Kingdom
Preceded by Harry Crookshank	Member of Parliament for Gainsborough; 1956–1983	Succeeded by Edward Leigh as MP for Gainsborough and Horncastle
Honorary titles
Preceded by Peter Kirk	Baby of the House; 1956–1957	Succeeded by Robert Cooke
