= Leslie Renton =

Leslie Renton

Alexander Leslie Renton (6 July 1868 – 6 May 1947) was a British Liberal and then Liberal Unionist politician.

== Background ==
A son of James Hall Renton, who also stood for parliament. He was educated at Harrow School and the Royal Military College, Sandhurst. He married in 1895, Kathleen Elliot Taylor of Horton Manor, Buckinghamshire. They had two sons and one daughter. She died in 1922.

== Military career ==
He joined the Royal Scots Greys in 1888. He served with the South African Light Horse in the Second Boer War (despatches, medal and three clasps). Following his return to the United Kingdom he was appointed Major in the Northamptonshire Yeomanry on 5 March 1902. He later served in World War I 1914–18. He travelled extensively in Africa and Central Asia.

== Political career ==
He contested South Dorset at the 1900 General Election as a Liberal. He was MP for Gainsborough from 1906 to 1910. He was elected as a Liberal, gaining the seat from the Conservatives in 1906. However he found himself out of step with the reforming nature of the government and left the Liberals in 1907 and sat as a Liberal Unionist for the rest of the parliament. In 1908 he opposed the Liberal Government's Licensing Bill, being one of the speakers to address a large demonstration in Hyde Park. He opposed the Liberal Government's House of Lord's reform proposals, considering them to be 'meddling'. Instead of trying to defend his seat under his new label he switched to contest Reading in January 1910 but was unable to unseat the Liberal MP. He did not stand for parliament again. He served as a justice of the peace.

== Sources ==
- Who Was Who
- British parliamentary election results 1885–1918, Craig, F. W. S.

Parliament of the United Kingdom
Preceded by Seymour Fitzroy Ormsby-Gore	Member of Parliament for Gainsborough; 1906–January 1910	Succeeded by George Jackson Bentham
