= 1937 Holland with Boston by-election =

UK parliamentary by-election

The 1937 Holland with Boston by-election was a parliamentary by-election held on 24 June 1937 for the British House of Commons constituency of Holland with Boston.

== Previous MP ==
The seat had become vacant when the constituency's Liberal National Party Member of Parliament (MP), Sir James Blindell (1884 – 10 May 1937) died.

He was first elected as the constituency's MP at the 1929 Holland with Boston by-election, caused by the death of the Conservative MP Arthur Dean. Blindell, standing as a Liberal, overturned a Conservative majority of nearly 5,000 to win with a majority of 3,706. His victory was the last Liberal by-election gain until Torrington in 1958.

Blindell was re-elected as a Liberal at the 1929 general election, but in 1931 he was one of the Liberal MPs who broke with their party to support Ramsay MacDonald's National Government, eventually forming the Liberal National Party.

He was re-elected as a Liberal National at the 1931 general election and at the 1935 general election. In both elections, the Conservatives (who also supported the National Government) did not field a candidate against him, and he was returned with large majorities.

== Candidates ==
Two candidates were nominated. The list below is set out in descending order of the number of votes received at the by-election.

1. The Liberal National Party candidate, supporting the National government, was Herbert Walter Butcher (12 June 1901 - 11 May 1966). After winning the by-election he retained the seat until he retired in 1966, shortly before he died.

2. Representing the Labour Party was E.E. Reynolds. He had previously contested Holland with Boston in the 1935 general election.

== Result ==
The Liberal National Party held the seat with a reduced majority.

1937 by-election: Holland with Boston
Party	Candidate	Votes	%	±%
Liberal National	Herbert Butcher	21,846	60.0	−5.5
Labour	E.E. Reynolds	14,556	40.0	+5.5
Majority		7,290	20.0	−11.0
Turnout		36,396	59.4	−4.2
Registered electors		61,333		
Liberal National hold		Swing	-5.5	

== See also ==
- Holland with Boston constituency
- List of United Kingdom by-elections
- United Kingdom by-election records

== Sources ==
- British Parliamentary Election Results 1918-1949, compiled and edited by F.W.S. Craig (Macmillan Press 1977)
- Who's Who of British Members of Parliament, Volume III 1919-1945, edited by M. Stenton and S. Lees (Harvester Press 1979)
- Who's Who of British Members of Parliament, Volume IV 1945-1979, edited by M. Stenton and S. Lees (Harvester Press 1981)
