= Joseph Bennett (British politician) =

English merchant and Liberal politician

Joseph Bennett (1829 – 1 January 1908) was an English merchant and Liberal politician.

Bennett was born at Grimsby, the son of William Bennett and his wife Ann. He was educated at Wesley College, Sheffield and became a merchant at Louth. He was a J.P. for Lindsey Division of Lincolnshire, and for the Boroughs of Louth and Grimsby

In the 1885 general election, Bennett was elected Member of Parliament for Gainsborough but lost the seat in the 1886 general election. He regained the seat in the 1892 general election but stood down from the House of Commons at the 1895 general election.

Bennett lived at Louth and died at the age of 78.

Parliament of the United Kingdom
New constituency	Member of Parliament for Gainsborough; 1885 – 1886	Succeeded by Henry Eyre
Preceded by Henry Eyre	Member of Parliament for Gainsborough; 1892 – 1895	Succeeded by Emerson Muschamp Bainbridge
