= Bertram Pollock =

Anglican bishop

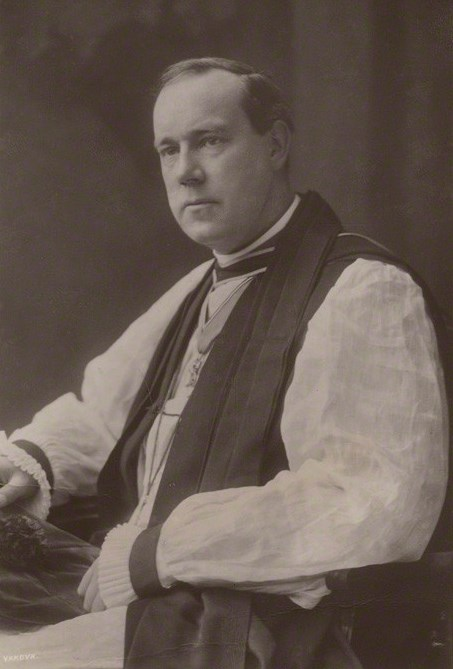
Photograph by Carl Vandyk, c. 1910

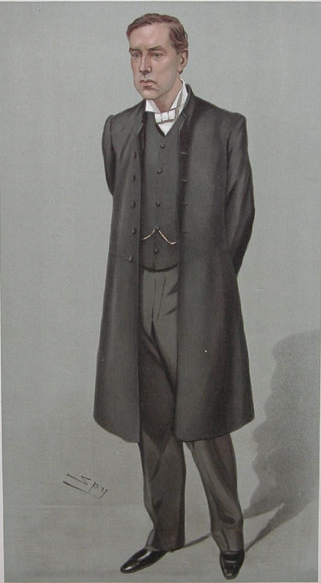
"Wellington College" — Pollock caricatured by Spy (Leslie Ward) in Vanity Fair, October 1902

Bertram Pollock KCVO (6 December 1863 – 17 October 1943) was a Church of England bishop, schoolmaster, and author.

Born in Hanworth, Middlesex, on 6 December 1863 to George Frederick Pollock — a barrister and Remembrancer to Queen Victoria and Edward VII — and his wife Frances, Bertram was the youngest of five sons, and also had a younger sister. His brother Ernest, a Conservative MP and Master of the Rolls, was created Viscount Hanworth in 1936. George Frederick was the third son of Frederick Pollock, 1st Baronet, of a family descended from David Pollok (sic) of that Ilk (died 1546), a member of the Scottish Clan Pollock. The Montagu-Pollock baronets descend from Frederick's younger brother, George.

Bertram was educated at Eagle House Preparatory School, Wimbledon (which moved in 1886 to a site adjacent to, and now incorporated with, Wellington College, Berkshire), then Charterhouse School. He matriculated at Trinity College, Cambridge in 1882, graduating BA (Classical Tripos, 1st class) in 1885, MA 1890, BD 1902, DD 1903.

He was ordained in the Church of England — made a deacon in Advent 1890 (21 December) and ordained a priest the Advent following (20 December 1891), both times by John Wordsworth, Bishop of Salisbury in Salisbury Cathedral. He was a Master and Chaplain at Marlborough and later Headmaster of Wellington College (1893–1910). There, one of his students was the author Harold Nicolson, who considered Pollock one of "the two who have influenced my intelligence" and "the most fascinating man I shall ever meet."

An Honorary Chaplain to the King, he was appointed to the episcopate as Bishop of Norwich in 1910, a post he held for 32 years. He was consecrated a bishop on St Mark's Day 1910 (25 April), by Randall Davidson, Archbishop of Canterbury, at St Paul's Cathedral. He died on 17 October 1943.

Pollock was made a Knight Commander of the Royal Victorian Order (KCVO) in 1921.

== Family ==
On 11 October 1928, Pollock married Joan Florence Helena Ryder, daughter of Algernon Charles Dudley Ryder (grandson of Dudley Ryder, 1st Earl of Harrowby). They had one daughter, (Mary) Rosalind Frances Felicia (born 24 April 1931).

== Works ==
- Good Men Without Faith, 1923
- The Church and English Life, 1932
- The Nation and the Nation's Worship, 1933
- Church and State, 1936

Church of England titles
Preceded by John Sheepshanks	Bishop of Norwich; 1910 –1942	Succeeded by Percy Herbert
