= Spalding (constituency) =

County constituency in Lincolnshire, England

- Former county constituency for the House of Commons

1885–1918
- Seats: one
- Created from: South Lincolnshire
- Replaced by: Holland with Boston

Spalding was a county constituency in Lincolnshire, which returned one Member of Parliament (MP) to the House of Commons of the Parliament of the United Kingdom.

The constituency was created by the Redistribution of Seats Act 1885 for the 1885 general election, and abolished for the 1918 general election.

== Members of Parliament ==
Year	Member	Party
1885	Murray Finch-Hatton	Conservative
1887	Halley Stewart	Liberal
1895	Harry Pollock	Liberal Unionist
1900	Horace Rendall Mansfield	Liberal
1910	Francis McLaren	Liberal
1917	George Peel	Liberal
1918	constituency abolished	

== Elections ==
=== Elections in the 1880s ===
General election 1885: Spalding
Party	Candidate	Votes	%	±%
Conservative	Murray Finch-Hatton	4,658	50.4	
Liberal	Halley Stewart	4,580	49.6	
Majority		78	0.8	
Turnout		9,238	79.7	
Registered electors		11,597		
Conservative win (new seat)				

Stewart

General election 1886: Spalding
Party	Candidate	Votes	%	±%
Conservative	Murray Finch-Hatton	4,561	51.6	+1.2
Liberal	Halley Stewart	4,273	48.4	−1.2
Majority		288	3.2	+2.4
Turnout		8,834	76.2	−3.5
Registered electors		11,597		
Conservative hold		Swing	+1.2	

Finch-Hatton succeeded to the peerage, becoming Earl of Winchilsea and Nottingham, causing a by-election.

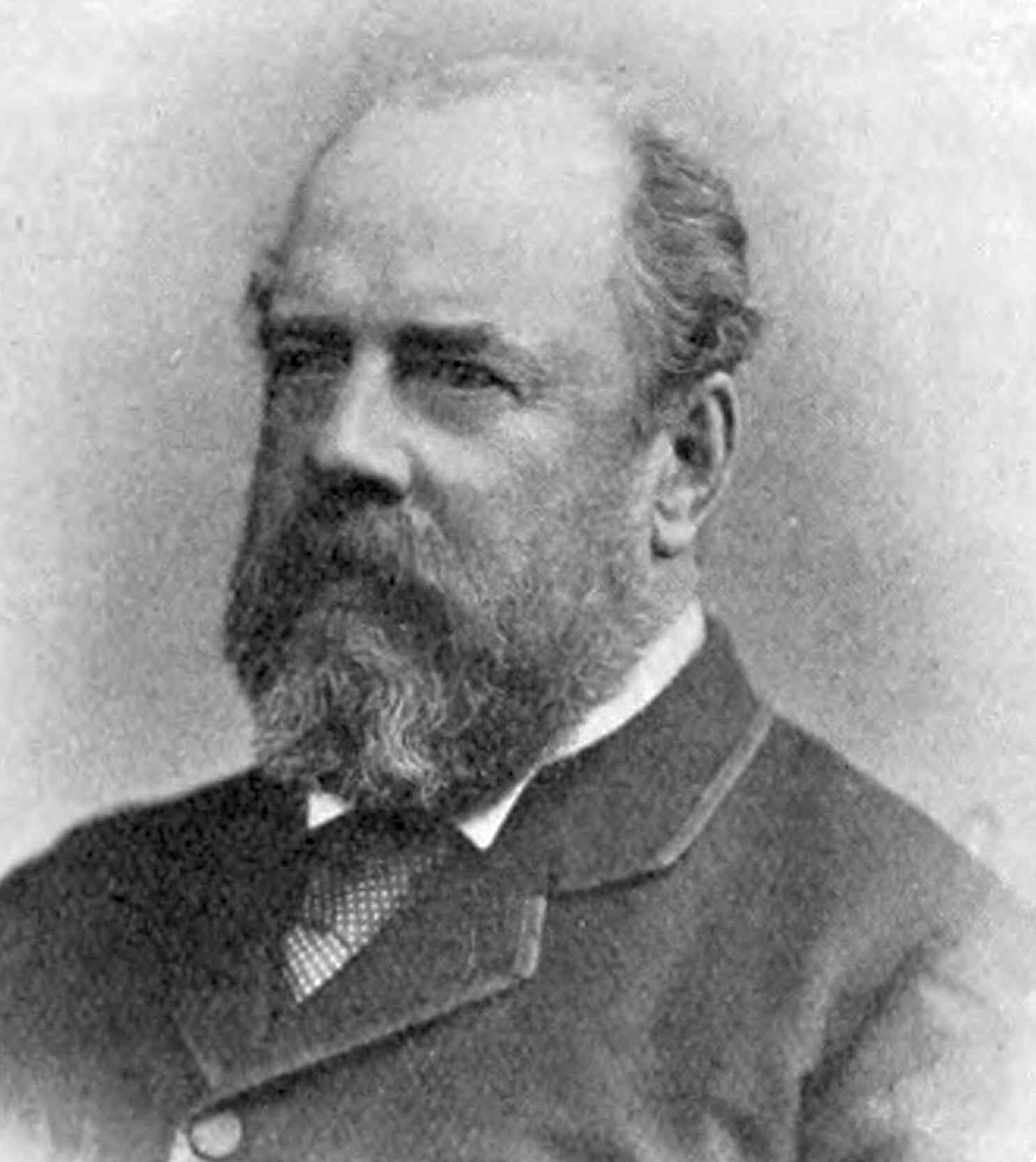
Tryon

By-election, 1 Jul 1887: Spalding
Party	Candidate	Votes	%	±%
Liberal	Halley Stewart	5,110	53.9	+5.5
Conservative	George Tryon	4,363	46.1	−5.5
Majority		747	7.8	N/A
Turnout		9,473	77.7	+1.5
Registered electors		12,188		
Liberal gain from Conservative		Swing	+5.5	

=== Elections in the 1890s ===
General election 1892: Spalding
Party	Candidate	Votes	%	±%
Liberal	Halley Stewart	4,660	51.8	+3.4
Liberal Unionist	Harry Pollock	4,334	48.2	−3.4
Majority		326	3.6	N/A
Turnout		8,994	68.9	−7.3
Registered electors		13,054		
Liberal gain from Conservative		Swing	+3.4	

General election 1895: Spalding
Party	Candidate	Votes	%	±%
Liberal Unionist	Harry Pollock	4,623	52.0	+3.8
Liberal	Halley Stewart	4,274	48.0	−3.8
Majority		349	4.0	N/A
Turnout		8,897	69.6	+0.7
Registered electors		12,775		
Liberal Unionist gain from Liberal		Swing	+3.8	

=== Elections in the 1900s ===
Mansfield

General election 1900: Spalding
Party	Candidate	Votes	%	±%
Liberal	Horace Mansfield	4,352	50.3	+2.3
Liberal Unionist	Ernest Pollock	4,295	49.7	−2.3
Majority		57	0.6	N/A
Turnout		8,647	68.9	−0.7
Registered electors		12,550		
Liberal gain from Liberal Unionist		Swing	+2.3	

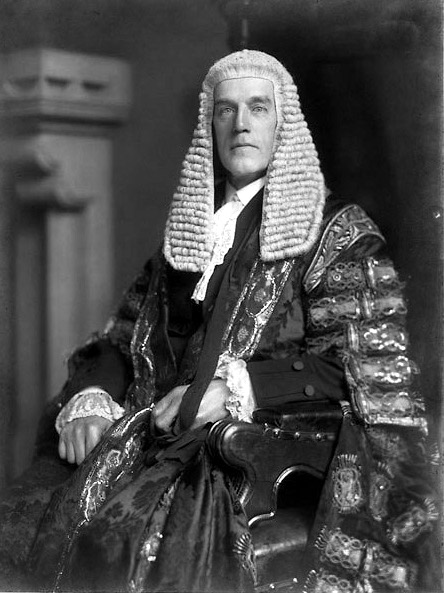
Pollock

General election 1906: Spalding
Party	Candidate	Votes	%	±%
Liberal	Horace Mansfield	5,800	58.1	+7.8
Liberal Unionist	Ernest Pollock	4,180	41.9	−7.8
Majority		1,620	16.2	+15.6
Turnout		9,980	68.3	−0.6
Registered electors		14,617		
Liberal hold		Swing	+7.8	

=== Elections in the 1910s ===
McLaren

General election January 1910: Spalding
Party	Candidate	Votes	%	±%
Liberal	Francis McLaren	5,527	51.8	−6.3
Conservative	William Royce	5,148	48.2	+6.3
Majority		379	3.6	−12.6
Turnout		10,675	78.2	+9.9
Liberal hold		Swing	−6.3	

General election December 1910: Spalding
Party	Candidate	Votes	%	±%
Liberal	Francis McLaren	5,335	51.3	−0.5
Conservative	William Royce	5,070	48.7	+0.5
Majority		265	2.6	−1.0
Turnout		10,405	76.3	−1.9
Liberal hold		Swing	−0.5	

== General Election 1914/15 ==
Another general election was required to take place before the end of 1915. The political parties had been making preparations for an election to take place and by July 1914, the following candidates had been selected;

- Liberal: Francis McLaren
- Unionist: William Royce

1917 Spalding by-election
Party	Candidate	Votes	%	±%
Liberal	George Peel	Unopposed		
Liberal hold				
