= Arthur Dean (British politician) =

Arthur Wellesley Dean (27 August 1857 – 7 February 1929) was a Conservative Party politician in the United Kingdom.

Dean of Carlton Scroop Manor, Grantham, was elected as the member of parliament (MP) for Holland with Boston at a by-election in July 1924 and re-elected at the general election in November 1924. He held the seat until his death in early 1929. The resulting by-election for his seat was won by the Liberal Party candidate James Blindell, the Liberals' last by-election gain until the 1958 Torrington by-election.

Parliament of the United Kingdom
Preceded by William Stapleton Royce	Member of Parliament for Holland with Boston; 1924–1929	Succeeded by James Blindell
