= William Royce (politician) =

British politician

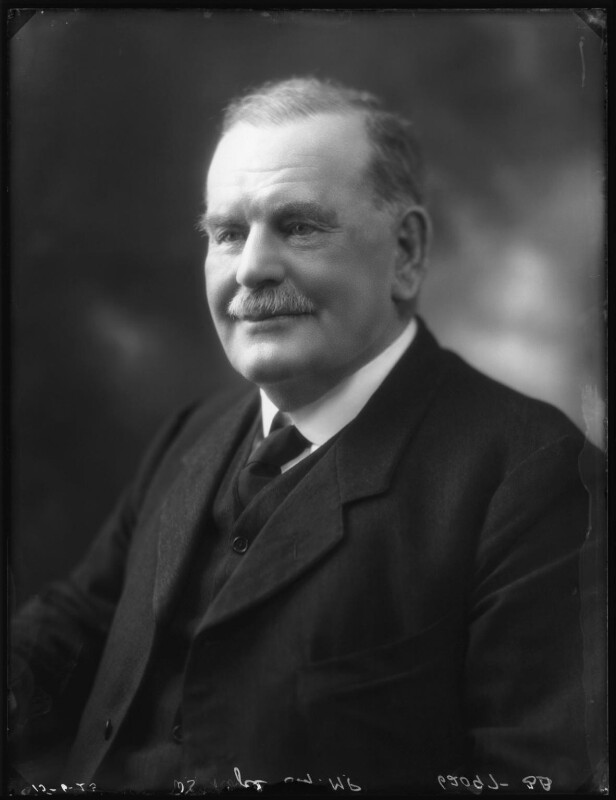
Royce in 1923

William Stapleton Royce (13 December 1858 – 23 June 1924) was an English Labour Party politician who served as Member of Parliament for the Holland with Boston constituency from 1918 until 1924.

He was born in Spalding, Lincolnshire, and was educated at the Willesby School and at Pretty's Commercial School, Spalding. On leaving school he was apprenticed to a joiner, but served only two years of his apprenticeship before running away to London, where he worked on the construction of the General Post Office building in St Martin's-le-Grand. Three months later, he learned that the Government of Cape Town was offering free passage to South Africa for men to build the railways in that country. He accepted a three-year contract, at the end of which he had saved enough money to set up in business on his own account.

During the next thirty years Royce was heavily engaged on the construction of various railway lines in South Africa, as well as some important public buildings. He married Emma Broedelet, the daughter of a Dutch missionary, in May 1882. In 1910, he sold his business interests in South Africa and returned to England, where he fought the January and December 1910 elections as the Conservative Party candidate for the Spalding division of Lincolnshire, but lost to his Liberal opponent. In 1917, the seat became vacant on the death of the sitting member, but he felt that this was no time for political conflict, and the Liberal candidate was returned unopposed.

However, in a three-cornered fight at the December 1918 general election, he successfully contested the new Holland-with-Boston division on behalf of the Labour Party, and held the seat at the 1922 and 1923 general elections.

He was offered the Governorship of Tasmania in June 1924, and decided to accept. However, before he was able to do so, he died of a heart attack on a London bus near Russell Square on 23 June 1924. The resulting by-election for his Commons seat was held the following month, and won by the Conservative Party candidate Arthur Dean.

== Sources ==
- William Stapleton Royce: a memoir by Charles Woodrooffe Ould, published by George Allen & Unwin Ltd in 1925.

Parliament of the United Kingdom
New constituency	Member of Parliament for Holland with Boston; 1918–1924	Succeeded by Arthur Dean
