= Agricultural Party =

Defunct political party in the United Kingdom

- Leader: J. F. Wright
- Founded: 1931
- Dissolved: 1940s
- Headquarters: Norfolk
- Ideology: Empire free trade with agricultural protection

The Agricultural Party was a minor political party in the United Kingdom. It was founded in 1931 as the Norfolk Farmers' Party but changed its name one week after its formation. It initially had the support of the National Farmers Union, Lord Rothermere and Lord Beaverbrook.

The party called for Empire free trade, agricultural protection, and the introduction of duties on food imports. It stood candidates in the 1931 general election and again in the East Fife by-election in 1933, but without success in both events, and it quickly lost its high-profile supporters. It appears to have been disbanded in the late 1940s.

== See also ==
- Empire Free Trade Crusade
- Imperial Preference
