= Heathcote baronets of London (1733) =

Escutcheon of the Heathcote baronets of London

The Heathcote baronetcy, of London, was created in the Baronetage of Great Britain on 17 January 1733 for Gilbert Heathcote, Lord Mayor of London, in 1711 and one of the founders of the Bank of England.

== History ==
The 1st Baronet's son, the 2nd Baronet, represented Grantham and Bodmin in the House of Commons.

The 2nd Baronet was succeeded by his son, the 3rd Baronet, who sat as a Member of Parliament for Shaftesbury. His son, the 4th Baronet, represented Lincolnshire and Rutland in Parliament as a Whig. On his death the titles passed to his son, the 5th Baronet, who sat as a Member of Parliament for Boston, South Lincolnshire and Rutland and served as Lord Lieutenant of Lincolnshire. In 1856 he was created Baron Aveland, of Aveland in the County of Lincoln, in the Peerage of the United Kingdom.

Lord Aveland married Clementina Drummond-Willoughby, 24th Baroness Willoughby de Eresby (a descendant of the Dukes of Ancaster and Kesteven). They were both succeeded by their son, the 2nd and 25th Baron respectively. In 1872 he assumed by royal licence the additional surnames of Willoughby and Drummond. Lord Aveland represented Boston and Rutland in the House of Commons as a Liberal. In 1892 the Ancaster title held by his maternal ancestors was revived when he was made Earl of Ancaster, in the County of Lincoln.

His son the 2nd Earl sat as a Member of Parliament for Horncastle and served as Lord Lieutenant of Rutland. The 3rd Earl represented Rutland and Stamford in the House of Commons and served as Lord Lieutenant of Lincolnshire. In 1951 he was summoned to the House of Lords through a writ in acceleration in his father's junior title of Baron Willoughby de Eresby. He succeeded his father later that year. His only son and heir Timothy, Lord Willoughby de Eresby, born 1936, went missing at sea in 1963. As a result, on Lord Ancaster's death in 1983, the barony of Aveland and earldom became extinct.

Lord Ancaster was succeeded in the barony of Willoughby de Eresby by his daughter Nancy. The Heathcote baronetcy also survived, and was inherited by the late Earl's kinsman, the 9th Baronet. He was a descendant of Robert Heathcote, 3rd son of the third Baronet, and was a Brigadier in the British Army. He was succeeded by his son when he died at the age of 100 in 2014.

The office of Lord Great Chamberlain since the death of Robert Bertie, 4th Duke of Ancaster and Kesteven in 1779 had become hereditary in gross. On the coronation of Edward VII and Alexandra, the situation was changed by declaration, with joint representatives of the 4th Duke's two sisters sharing it. The holder of the earldom of Ancaster was the senior holder; with Earl Carrington and the Marquess of Cholmondeley.

== Heathcote baronets, of London (1733) ==
- Sir Gilbert Heathcote, 1st Baronet (1652–1733)
- Sir John Heathcote, 2nd Baronet (1689–1759)
- Sir Gilbert Heathcote, 3rd Baronet (died 1785)
- Sir Gilbert Heathcote, 4th Baronet (1773–1851)
- Sir Gilbert John Heathcote, 5th Baronet (1795–1867) (created Baron Aveland in 1856)

=== Baron Aveland (1856) ===
- Gilbert John Heathcote, 1st Baron Aveland (1795–1867)
- Gilbert Henry Heathcote-Drummond-Willoughby, 2nd Baron Aveland (1830–1910) (created Earl of Ancaster in 1892)

=== Earl of Ancaster (1892) ===
Arms of Heathcote-Drummond-Willoughby

- Gilbert Henry Heathcote-Drummond-Willoughby, 1st Earl of Ancaster (1830–1910)
- Gilbert Heathcote-Drummond-Willoughby, 2nd Earl of Ancaster (1867–1951)
- Gilbert James Heathcote-Drummond-Willoughby, 3rd Earl of Ancaster (1907–198

=== Heathcote baronets, of London (1733; reverted) ===
- Sir Gilbert Simon Heathcote, 9th Baronet (1913–2014)
- Sir Mark Simon Robert Heathcote, 10th Baronet (1941–2025)
- Sir Alistair Robert Heathcote, 11th Baronet (born 1977).

The heir presumptive is the current holder's brother, Nicholas Alexander Heathcote (born 1979).

== Extended family ==
- Claud Heathcote-Drummond-Willoughby, third son of the 1st Earl of Ancaster, was a Conservative politician.

== Notes ==
Baronetage of Great Britain
Preceded by Pleydell baronets	Heathcote baronets of London; 17 January 1733	Succeeded by Heathcote baronets
