= Heathcote-Drummond-Willoughby =

Heathcote-Drummond-Willoughby is a surname. Notable people with the surname include:

- Claud Heathcote-Drummond-Willoughby (1872–1950), British Conservative Party politician
- Charles Strathavon Heathcote-Drummond-Willoughby (1870–1949), British army officer
- Gilbert Heathcote-Drummond-Willoughby (disambiguation), several people
- James Heathcote-Drummond-Willoughby, 3rd Earl of Ancaster (1907–1983), British Conservative politician
- Jane Heathcote-Drummond-Willoughby, 28th Baroness Willoughby de Eresby PC (born 1934), the daughter of the 3rd Earl of Ancaster

== See also ==
- Heathcote (surname)
- Drummond (surname)
- Willoughby (surname)
