= Spilsby =

Market town and civil parish in Lincolnshire, England

Coordinates: 53.17270°N 0.09310°E

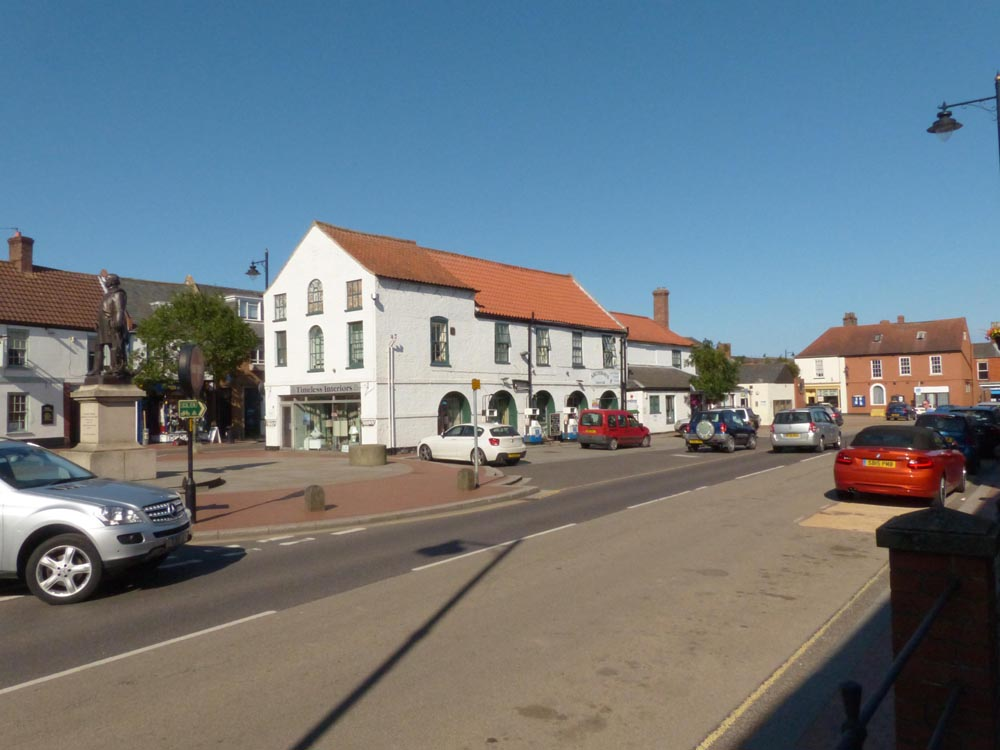
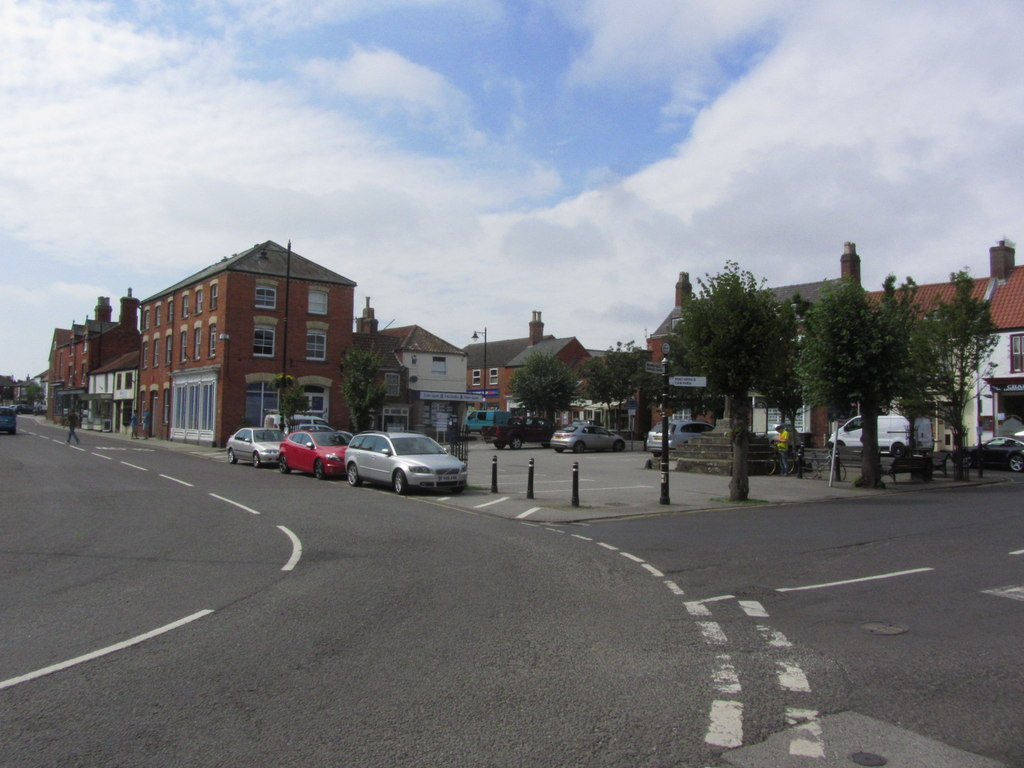
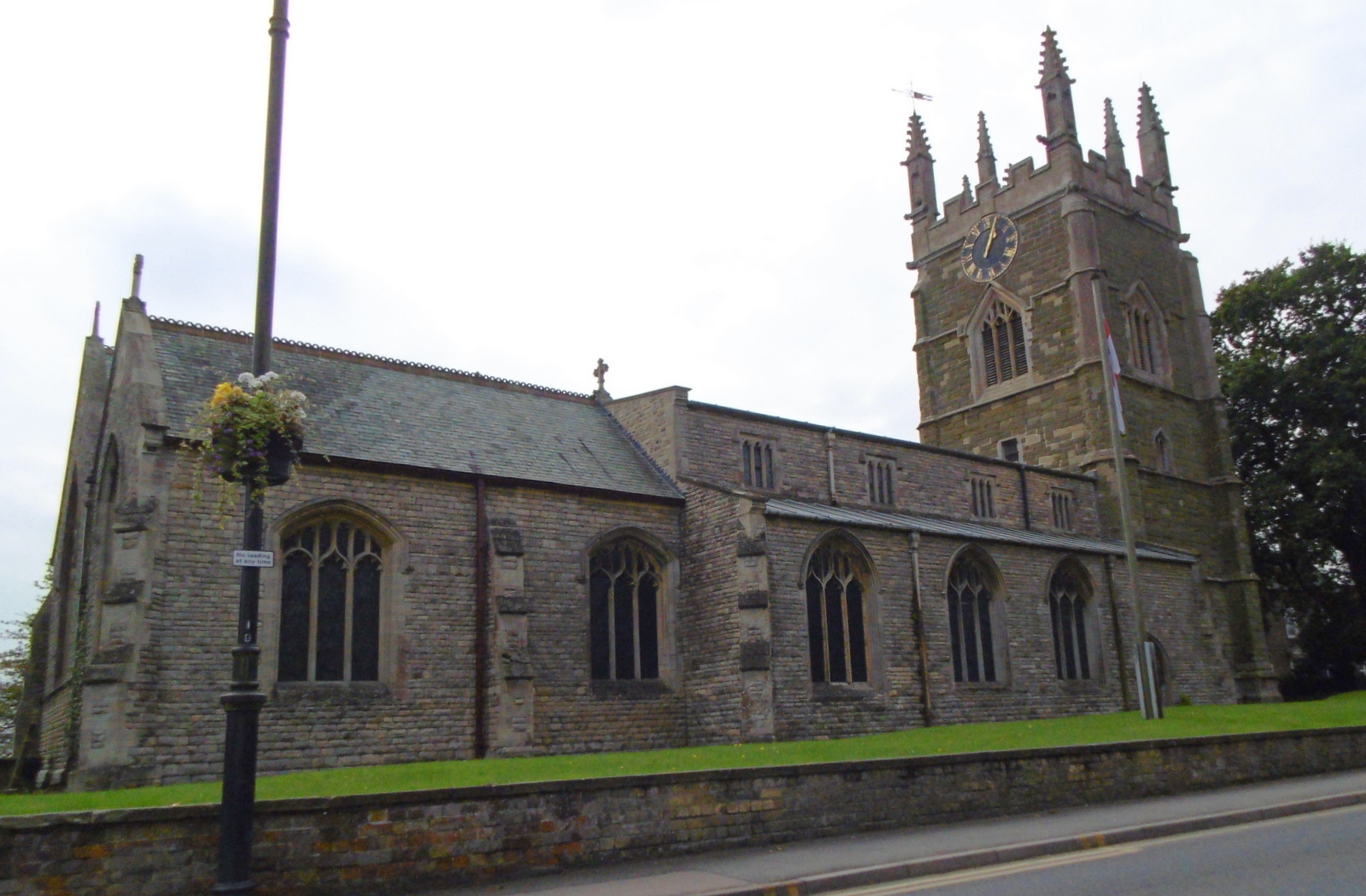
- Clockwise from top: Spilsby Old Town Hall, the Grade I listed St James Church and High Street

- Location within Lincolnshire
- Population: 3,677 (Parish/Ward, 2021)
- OS grid reference: TF4066
  - London: 120 mi (190 km) S
- District: East Lindsey
- Shire county: Lincolnshire
- Region: East Midlands
- Country: England
- Sovereign state: United Kingdom
- Post town: SPILSBY
- Postcode district: PE23
- Dialling code: 01790
- Police: Lincolnshire
- Fire: Lincolnshire
- Ambulance: East Midlands
- UK Parliament: Louth and Horncastle

Spilsby is a market town and civil parish in the East Lindsey district of Lincolnshire, England. The town is adjacent to the main A16, 33 miles (53 km) east of Lincoln, 17 miles (27 km) north-east of Boston and 13 miles (21 km) north-west of Skegness. It lies at the southern edge of the Lincolnshire Wolds and north of the Fenlands.

The town has been a rural market town for more than 700 years. It has changed little in size since the beginning of the 19th century. The town centre includes a range of small supermarkets,traditional newsagents, baker, butchers, jewellers and clothing stores, together with public houses, cafes and fast-food takeaways.

At the centre of town is an open square or traditional market place, from which the four main town streets radiate. Markets take place on a Monday. As Spilsby is located within a predominantly agricultural area, much of the market produce consists of locally grown vegetables and meat.

The population of the town was 2,336 in the 2001 census, increasing to 3,045 at the 2011 Census.

== History ==
=== Early history ===
The area has been occupied by humans since prehistoric times. Evidence for this can be found at nearby West Keal, where an Iron Age hill fort and defensive terraced earthworks were built at the tip of the Wolds promontory, overlooking the present town.

The Spilsby area was visited and occupied by the Romans during the 1st century and held by them until the 4th century AD. During the 1960s, an archaeological dig and field walk at nearby Keal Cotes, in a large field south of the village (where the A16 meets Hagnaby Lane), discovered tessellated mosaic floor tiles and roof tiles. These indicated that a substantial Roman villa or high-status Romano-British farmhouse once stood on the site. The recorded finds from the site are stored at the Museum of Lincolnshire Life in Lincoln, Lincolnshire. In 1849 six Roman funeral urns were dug up in nearby Fulletby.

Spilsby was probably named before or no later than the 9th-century period of Danish rule, which had extended for centuries. It derives from the term Spila's-by, where by is old Old Norse for "place of dwelling". Hence, it meant "Spila's village", Spila (pronounced "Spiller") having been the local Viking warlord or chieftain, who acted as head of the immediate area. The town was recorded in the Domesday Book of 1086 as "Spilesbei". In 1082 it was not much more than a large farmstead and a few surrounding crofts under the squireship of the Bishop of Durham.

In 1255 a charter was granted to a John de Beke (or John Beck) to hold a weekly market in Spilsby each Monday and a three-day annual fair in July. Four years later, in 1259, the same John de Beke was granted a further charter to hold a three-day Christmas fair from 5–8 December. The next recorded charter to hold a weekly Monday market in the town and an annual fair in July was granted in 1302 to the Lord of the manor, Norman noble Robert de Willoughby. A copy of this charter is in the parish church.

At the east end of the town centre's marketplace stands a medieval buttercross monument. The architectural historian Nikolaus Pevsner suggests that the Spilsby Buttercross dates from as early as the 14th and certainly no later than the 16th century. The stepped bases of these monuments were used by early traders on market day to display their goods, usually milk, cheeses and butter.

Standing in the centre of the marketplace is the Old Town Hall. More recently it has been used as a store and petrol station. In the 18th century the town civic offices, a small courtroom, and the town gaol, were in the upstairs level supported by the arches. The ground level was an open covered space used as the local corn exchange and for stalls by market traders that were protected from the weather.

=== The Manor of Eresby ===
An oft-repeated historical myth is that the Manor of Eresby, including the lands and parish of Spilsby, was awarded to Walter de Beke, sometime after 1083, by William the Conqueror. This myth is one of several generated in the writings of William Dugdale. However, the Domesday Book of 1086 shows that the manor of Spilsby was held in 1086 by the Bishop of Durham (St Cuthbert's) as both Lord and tenant-in-chief. The only Domesday entry for Walter of Bec is as Lord of Singleborough, under Walter Giffard, the tenant-in-chief.

Other sources indicate that another Walter de Bec, who may or may not be related to the aforementioned Walter, married Agnes of Tattershall, daughter of Hugh, son of Pinco FitzEudo. She brought Spilsby, and the Manor of Eresby, with her, those lands being gifted to her by William I.

The manor was held by the Beke family until the male line died out, leaving Alice, the daughter of John Beke, 1st Baron Beke of Eresby, and the sole heiress of Walter, 2nd Baron Beke de Eresby, her brother who died in about 1310. The manor passed to Robert de Willoughby by way of his father William de Willoughby's marriage to Alice de Beke in about 1254. The Willoughby family originated in nearby Willoughby in the Marsh. In 1313, Robert was summoned to parliament as the first Baron Willoughby de Eresby, a family line that continues to the 28th Baroness Willoughby de Eresby.

The original manor house from the 14th century stood near the site of the later mansion. It was probably demolished when the new manor was built. During excavations in the mid-1960s, fragments of the earlier dwelling were discovered. Many examples of medieval and post-medieval pottery shards were recovered from the site of the Eresby Manor's moat by archeologist E. H. Rudkin in 1966.

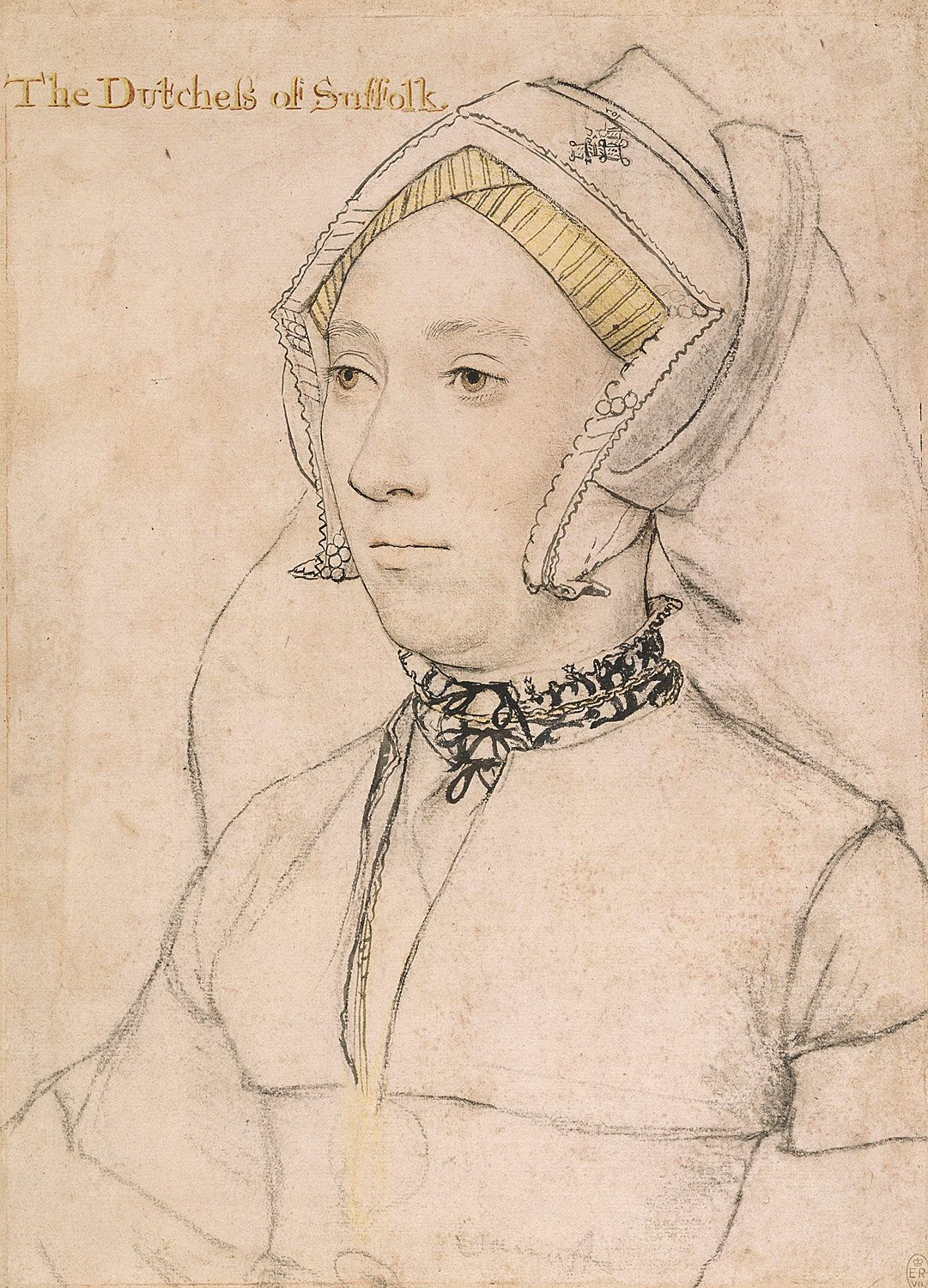
Catherine Willoughby, Duchess of Suffolk, by Hans Holbein the Younger.

The new Eresby manor house was built by Charles Brandon, 1st Duke of Suffolk, in 1535. He acquired the property after marrying his ward, the fifteen-year-old Catherine Willoughby, daughter and heiress of the William, 11th Baron Willoughby de Eresby.

In 1769, the Manor House was destroyed by fire during the stewardship of the 19th Baron, who was also Duke of Ancaster and Kesteven. It is believed that a carpenter accidentally started a fire with his candle while he was working in the roof space. A 1771 plan shows that the house was built in an 'H' shape. The plan also shows details of the grounds, which included an orangery, cherry orchard, bowling green, dovecote, and an ash grove, all near to the house. The Manor House had originally been moated, but by 1771 the moat had been adapted as an ornamental fishing lake.

The Church of England parish church of St James is built of the local Spilsby green sandstone. Parts of it date from the late 14th century, although it has been much added to over the centuries. The church has important funerary monuments. The greenstone is a soft and porous stone that absorbs water. The church was recased in Lancaster stone. It can seat a congregation of around 750. The parish churchyard was closed to further burials when it ran out of available space in 1884.

To mark his inheritance of the title in 1349, the 3rd Baron, Sir John de Willoughby, built a private chapel on his estate. Dedicated to the Holy Trinity, it was endowed with collegiate status, with a master and up to twelve priests. When the head of the family founded the King Edward VI Grammar School in 1550, the school initially had no school building. The twenty or so children were taught in the Eresby chapel building for the next sixty years.

The Willoughby family provided a school house in 1611, by converting an agricultural building on the edge of the estate. In 1839 the school house of 1611 was replaced by a new school building that was constructed on its current site, with funds provided by the 25th Baron, who was the first Earl of Ancaster.

The site of the Manor House was partially excavated in the mid 20th century by archaeologist and folklorist Ethel Rudkin.

=== Bolingbroke Castle ===
Bolingbroke Castle was built in the nearby parish of Bolingbroke after 1220 by Ranulph de Blondeville, Earl of Chester and Earl of Lincoln. Henry de Bolingbroke, later to become King Henry IV at the age of thirty-two, was born at Bolingbroke Castle in 1366.

The castle was much damaged during the English Civil War and, after the nearby Battle of Winceby in October 1643, only the lower sections of the outer walls remained. The last standing section of the castle, the gatehouse, collapsed in 1815.

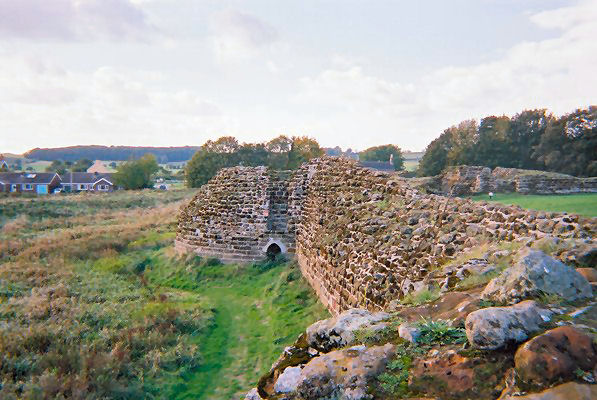
Bolingbroke Castle, Lincolnshire

Bolingbroke's original walls, also constructed of Spilsby greenstone, were in an irregular hexagon, with round towers on five of the corners. The gatehouse consists of two towers built about 3 yards apart. Leading to a portcullis further inside was a drawbridge that spanned the moat. The moat encircled an area about 87 yards in diameter. The six walls were 6½ feet wide and varied in length from 16 to 32 feet (4.9–9.8 metres) long. There was a small priest door in the rear wall just above the moat water line. The castle garrison was supported and supplied by an important market village outside the castle walls. It included several small farms, a friary and salmon lakes, two mills, and the chantry church of St. Peter & St. Paul.

=== Gunby Hall ===
According to the dated keystone on the west doorway, Gunby Hall was built in 1700 by Sir Henry Massingberd. The mansion still stands in several acres of landscaped and wooded parkland, including gardens containing a blue gazebo. Locally born Poet Laureate Alfred, Lord Tennyson described it as "an English home... all things in order stored and a haunt of peace". The original words, written in his own hand, are framed and preserved in the hall's library.

During the Second World War, the Air Ministry attempted to build an airfield at Gunby that would have covered the estate and necessitated demolishing the mansion. The then-owner, Field Marshal Sir Archibald Montgomery-Massingberd, personally appealed to King George VI. The Air Ministry relented, redrawing the plans that resulted in building RAF Spilsby two miles (three kilometres) further south at Great Steeping. The runway eventually ended only a few yards short of the Gunby estate boundary hedge.

Gunby Hall was one of the first major British mansion houses and estates to be presented to the National Trust in 1944. It is open to the public on limited days of the week during the summer, while remaining a private family residence for the remainder of the year.

=== Hundleby ===
Hundleby was an ancient parish that fell within Spilsby. It has not changed greatly in size or layout for the past two hundred years. The village population in 1801 was 218, and in 1901 it reached a peak of 528, mostly agricultural farm workers and their families. By 1971 the population had fallen to 439. It has remained fairly stable ever since with only minor fluctuations.

Hundleby's Anglican St Mary's parish church was rebuilt between 1853 and 1855, and seated around two hundred parishioners. The parish had a long-standing right to send three children to the Raithby parish free school. Hundleby's elementary school was built around 1860 and was enlarged in 1884 to accommodate up to 120 children.

Grace Swan Memorial Cottage Hospital was built in Hundleby during the late 19th century as a 25-bed in-patient facility. It was split between charity and private fee-paying wards, with its own operating theatre, maternity unit and resident surgeon. Closed by the local health authority as part of a rationalisation programme during the 1990s, the building is now a local health centre.

Spilsby Poor Law Union group of parishes had a workhouse in Hundleby, built in 1838. The workhouse was recorded in 1870 as having 280 residents. The workhouse was later converted into Spilsby's Gables Hospital, which was demolished in the early 21st century for the construction of new housing.

=== Spilsby in the 19th century ===
In 1833 a new cemetery of approximately one acre was established on Boston Road. White's 1842 Directory described Spilsby as being "a small, but thriving and well-built market town, pleasantly seated on an eminence, which overlooks an extensive tract of marshes and fens. Eresby is a small hamlet just south of town."

In 1839 the King Edward VI Grammar School had moved from its original 17th-century school building to a new school built on its current site in Spilsby. The grammar school building was abandoned during the 1990s after the two Spilsby secondary schools had amalgamated as Spilsby High School.

In the mid-19th century, several chapels for nonconformist Methodism were built in the town, including Wesleyan Methodist, Primitive Methodist and Independent Methodists. When the Independents built a new chapel in 1866, they converted their original chapel to a Sunday school. The Wesleyans built a chapel opposite the Buttercross, in Market Place, during 1878.

A prison for the area was built in Spilsby between 1824 and 1826. It occupied a site where Spence Street and West End now stand. The prison covered just over 2 acres (0.8 hectares) surrounded by a high brick wall and fronted by a courthouse. It was enlarged in 1869 to provide 85 single cells. The prison was demolished in 1876, except for the small front area. This contained the sessions house with a Greek Doric-pillared portico, police station and town lockup. The Sessions House of 1826, where court quarter sessions for the district of Lindsey were held until 1878, is now home to the Spilsby Theatre and Arts Centre.

The town's gasworks were constructed in 1853, opening in 1854 on Ashby Road, bringing street and house lighting to the town for the first time. In 1908 the North East Lincolnshire Water Company opened a pumping station in Hundleby, with a 75,000-imperial-gallon (340,000-litre) reservoir on Raithby Hill. It brought tap water to homes in Spilsby for the first time.

In 1892 Spilsby Pavilion opened, with a further room opened in 1896, each room accommodating 300 to 400 people. At the time, the Pavilion was advertised as providing accommodation for "dancing parties and smoking concerts". The Masonic Lodge and Hall opened on Halton Road in 1913.

The parish had 22 acres (9 hectares) set aside as "poor land", owning many tenements and the Red Lion public house. Annual rental revenue from these properties, £76-5s-0d (£76.25) in 1842, was distributed half-yearly among any poor in the parish who did not receive any other financial aid from the town's poor rates. As a result of the 1834 Poor Law Amendment Act, the parish became part of the Spilsby Poor Law Union, which covered 33 local parishes.

=== Railway connections ===
A small local railway company built a branch line from Firsby junction to Spilsby, which opened on 1 May 1868. The branch was just over four miles (six kilometres) long and connected Spilsby to the King's Cross, London to Cleethorpes main line. The only other railway station on the branch line was Halton Holegate Halt. The necessary parliamentary permission had been obtained by an Act in July 1865 which incorporated the Spilsby & Firsby Railway Company with an authorised capital of £20,000 and loans of £8,333 for the construction of the four-mile-long (six-kilometre), single-track branch.

Construction of the railway began in March 1867. The ceremonial cutting of the first turf was performed by the local rector, the Reverend Rawnsley, who was standing in for the railway company's chairman Lord Willoughby de Eresby the 25th Baron. The railway was expected to be opened quickly but disputes with the contractors arose over the quality of their work, and several lengths of track had to be replaced. The Great Northern Railway bought out the Spilsby & Firsby Railway Company for £20,000 through an Act of Parliament on 25 July 1890.

Passenger services were suspended in 1939. A goods service for grain, potatoes, livestock and other agricultural products continued for nearly 20 years. Goods including petrol, paraffin and coal continued to come into Spilsby via the rail link up to its final closure on 30 November 1958.

The main station building was demolished in 1965. The engine shed has been used by agricultural suppliers as a shop and store, with new sections added. The original trackbed within the town has been built on, with most of it covered by the Vale Industrial Estate. Outside the town, most of the old track route to Firsby can still be seen in aerial photographs, marked by the avenue of trees and bushes.

=== Military connections ===
The Seventh Spilsby Rifle Volunteer Corps, an early part-time army detachment, part of the Volunteer Force, was formed in the town during 1860. At its height, the corps contained about 100 members. In 1872, Captain J. W. Preston was the officer in charge, supported by Lt George Walker, Ensign Robert MacKinder and drill-master Sergeant Thomas Ward.

In 1889 the Rifle Volunteer Corps, renamed as F Company of the First Volunteer Battalion, was based in Spilsby. Its commandant was the now-promoted Major George Walker. He was aided by Lt G. B. Walker and Lt W. Hoff, Acting Surgeon Lieutenant Francis John Walker and the acting chaplain Rev. Pownoll Kendall.

In 1899 Spilsby's Territorial Force Drill Hall was completed in Halton Road, built of solid red brick. The site also contained housing and quarters for the resident professional army sergeant instructors.

In 1912, C Company of the 5th Battalion Lincolnshire Regiment (Territorial Force) was formed in the town. The company's commandant was Captain H. S. Scorer (killed in action at Hohenzollern Redoubt on 13 October 1915 during the First World War), Surgeon Colonel Francis John Walker was the chief medical officer, and the regular army drill instructor was Colour Sergeant Wallace Cowling.

=== Royal Air Force in Spilsby ===
During the Second World War, RAF Spilsby, a bomber airfield designed for Lancaster bombers, was built at Great Steeping. It opened for operations on 20 September 1943. Later used by the United States Air Force as a strategic bomber base until 1958, the airfield was finally demolished in the late 1970s. The runways and perimeter track were torn up, with most of the crushed aggregate being used in the construction of the new Humber Bridge.

RAF Spilsby is commemorated by an airfield memorial standing just outside Great Steeping and by plaques in All Saints' Church, Great Steeping. Cropmarks showing the airfield's runway layout are still visible in aerial photographs.

Spilsby Air Training Corps formed in 1950 initially as a detached flight of the established Skegness squadron, becoming the 2266 Spilsby Squadron ATC in 1952. Falling membership resulted in the squadron's disbandment in 2005.

RAF Spilsby was rebuilt in the 1950s as a standby base in case of war. It was designated as a standby base for escort fighters only and never used, and there is no record of any aircraft ever landing here. The new runway was weak because of drainage problems.

== Governance ==
Spilsby parish was traditionally in the East division of the ancient Bolingbroke Wapentake in the East Lindsey district in the parts of Lindsey. The parish was also in the Bolingbroke Soke. Kelly's 1913 Directory of Lincolnshire places the parish in the South Lindsey division of the county.

Spilsby, governed locally by Spilsby Town Council, is under East Lindsey District Council based at Manby.

Spilsby falls under the Louth and Horncastle Westminster parliamentary constituency. The sitting MP is Victoria Atkins.

== Geography ==
The town is situated upon slightly elevated ground at the southwestern rim of the Lincolnshire Wolds. Spilsby has an extensive south-east view of a tract of marsh and fen land, bounded by Boston Deeps and the North Sea. It is within 12 miles (19 km) inland from Skegness.

The Wolds comprise a series of low hills and steep valleys, underlain by calcareous chalk, green limestone and sandstone rock, laid down in the Cretaceous period under a shallow warm sea. The characteristic open valleys of the Wolds were created during the last ice age through the action of glaciation and meltwater.

Geographically, the Lincolnshire Wolds are a continuation of the Yorkshire Wolds, which run up through the East Riding of Yorkshire. The Wolds as a whole were bisected by the erosion of the waters of the River Humber. The fenlands, which stretch down as far as Norfolk, are former wetlands, consisting both of peat bogs and tidal silt marshes. They were nearly all drained by the end of the 19th century, when Spilsby had its longest period of Victorian expansion.

The drainage was organised into river drainage, the passing of upland water through the region, and internal drainage of the land between the rivers. The internal drainage was designed to be organised by levels or districts, each of which includes the fen parts of one or several parishes. Spilsby falls within the Witham Fourth District: East, West and Wildmore Fens; and the Townland, from Boston to Wainfleet.

== Demography ==
=== Previous population counts ===
Historical population sizes for the town include:

1801 – 932
1821 – 1,234
1841 – 1,434
1861 – 1,467
1881 – 1,423
1911 – 1,464
1931 – 1,654

=== 2001 census ===
The latest figures are drawn from the 2001 census:

Population in 2001: 2,336

47.3% male and 52.7% female
26.3% single and never married, 47.8% married, the remainder split between separated, divorced and widowed
98.6% White with 1.4% spread between Asian, British Asian, Indian and Chinese

81.4% Christian, with 11% indicating no religion, and the remainder split between other religions

56.1% employed, 20.3% retired and 3% unemployed, remainder in full-time education

60.1% of households were owner occupied, significantly below the national average
2011 census
The latest figures are drawn from the 2011 census.
Population: 3045
Number of households: 1398
Average household size: 2.1
Residents in households: 2992
Residents in communal living: 53
Area: 500 hectares
Population density (people per hectare): 6.10

=== Ethnicity and religion ===
Spilsby had a population of 3,677 at the 2021 Census, of the results of it. Spilsby's ethnic makeup was 98.1% White and 1.9% other ethnics. Of the religious makeup of the parish, the around 54.8% were Christian, followed by 44.2% irreligious and other religions being less than 1%.

== Economy ==
The area is predominantly a rural agricultural economy, with increasing tourism to Spilsby and the surrounding market towns in the Wolds.

== Landmarks ==
Spilsby and nearby landmarks include Gunby Hall, a National Trust property open on selected days during summer months, the Buttercross monument, a statue to Sir John Franklin, Spilsby Theatre and Arts Centre, Northcote Heavy Horse Centre and Bolingbroke Castle.

The Battle of Britain Memorial Flight at nearby RAF Coningsby contains a flying collection, with a Lancaster bomber plus five Spitfire and two Hurricane fighters, plus a DC47 Dakota transport and two Chipmunk trainers. Lincolnshire Aviation Heritage Centre is in East Kirkby, Spilsby on the site of RAF East Kirkby. The museum commemorates the RAF's presence in Lincolnshire during the Second World War, with airfields such as RAF Scampton being in the flat Lincolnshire countryside. The museum contains one of the world's three remaining Lancaster bombers still capable of flying, although it does not currently fly. Plans were announced in March 2008 to raise the funds necessary to get the Lancaster into the air again.

Snipe Dales Nature Reserve and Country Park is next to the historic Civil War battlefield at nearby Winceby.

== Education ==
=== Pre school facilities ===
==== Rural pre school ====
- Bright Sparks Kindergarten – Fen Road, Spilsby
- Nestlings Nursery – Rookery Farm, Little Steeping
- Skendleby Play School – Gunby

==== Urban pre school ====
- Spilsby and Skegness Portage – Eresby Avenue, Spilsby
- Spilsby Playgroup – Woodlands Road, Spilsby
- Totschool Playgroup – Halton Road, Spilsby

=== Primary education ===
==== Rural primary school ====
- Great Steeping Primary School- mixed sex; approx 115 pupils (67 boys and 48 girls)
- Halton Holegate C of E Primary School - mixed sex; approx 56 pupils (24 boys and 32 girls)
- Partney C of E Primary School - mixed sex; approx 83 pupils (46 boys and 37 girls)
- Toynton All Saints' Primary School - mixed sex; approx 92 pupils (42 boys and 50 girls)

==== Urban primary school ====
- Spilsby Primary School - mixed sex; approx 254 pupils (132 boys and 122 girls)

=== Secondary education ===
King Edward VI Academy, is a coeducational bi-lateral secondary school and specialist Humanities College for children between the ages of 11 and 18. The bilateral status is unusual, with less than five similar arrangements in the whole of England and Wales, permitting those who have passed the 11+ examination and those that fail the exam to study separately but under the same roof.

The school is an amalgamation of two separate institutions, the King Edward VI Grammar School opened in 1550 and the Sir John Franklin Secondary Modern School, which opened in 1954. These schools were originally combined in 1991 as Spilsby High School, initially retaining both sites and renaming twice. In September 2008 a sixth form college was established that provides education for over-16s, with provision for study towards a BTEC National Diploma Studies in Business Studies.

The original 1837 grammar school building was abandoned and stood empty for several years, but could not be demolished due to its Grade II listing status. In 2007 the front portion of the old school was adapted as a community facility providing meeting rooms and access to IT use. The rear of the school was demolished and has been developed for new residential housing.

=== Special schools ===
- Eresby School - Eresby Avenue, Spilsby. A special school for children aged between 2 and 19
- Woodlands Academy - Spilsby. A specialist secondary academy for pupils with Social, Emotional and Mental Health (SEMH) needs.

== Religious sites ==
- St James' Church – Church of England – Church Street & Boston Road
- Church of Our Lady & the English Martyrs – Catholic – Church Road opposite Spilsby Theatre
- Spilsby Methodist Church – opposite the Buttercross
- All Saints' Church – Christian Fellowship
- Spilsby Christian Fellowship – Halton Road

== Media ==
Local news and television programmes are provided by BBC Yorkshire and Lincolnshire and ITV Yorkshire. Television signals are received from the Belmont TV transmitter.

Local radio stations are BBC Radio Lincolnshire, Greatest Hits Radio Lincolnshire and Hits Radio Lincolnshire.

The town is served by these local newspapers, Skegness Standard and East Lindsey Target.

== Sports and recreation ==
Spilsby has football, bowls and hockey clubs, and a sports pavilion and playing fields on Ancaster Avenue. The Spilsby Show takes place on the playing fields every July, with proceeds supporting local charities.

Spilsby Town F.C. is a football club that was formed in 1881. The first team currently play in the Boston Cropleys Suzuki Premier Division. The Reserve team play in the first division. The league is not officially a member of the English football league system, but clubs have in recent years moved up to the Lincolnshire Football League and then the Central Midlands League or United Counties League (the 12th level of the football league pyramid). Spilsby Town are 3-times winners of the Lincolnshire Senior Cup in 1881–82, 1882–83 and 1883–84. Between 1880 and 1885 Spilsby Town entered the FA Cup each year but were unable to progress beyond the first round. Spilsby Juniors Football Club Spilsby Juniors was formed during the summer of 1998 when the Mid-Lincolnshire youth football league accepted an application to enter a single Under-12 team in that year's Division C. The club expanded and now runs four teams from Under-9s to Under-14s.

Spilsby holds dance and yoga classes at the High School on Monday nights and tai chi at the Town Hall on Tuesday evenings.

Spilsby also holds judo classes on Fridays at 6:00pm at the pavilion

== Twin towns ==
Spilsby is twinned with:

- Fresnay-sur-Sarthe, France
- Bassum, Germany

== Notable people ==
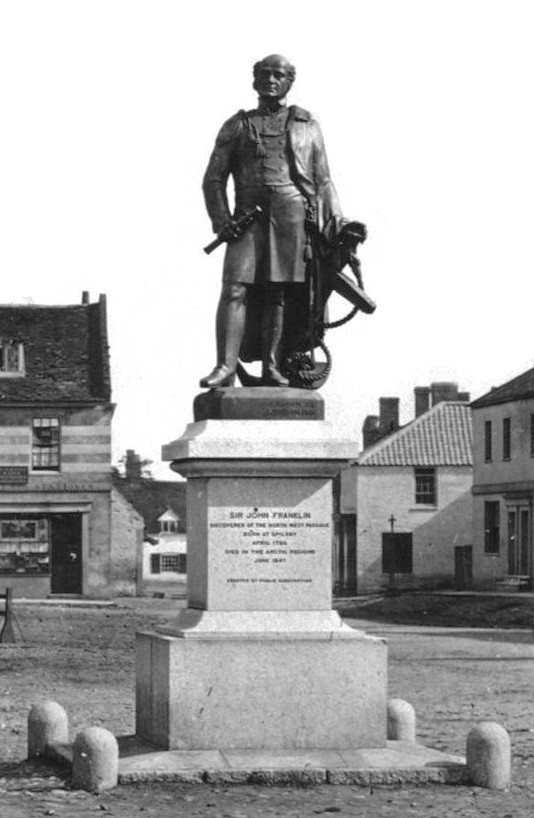
Statue of the explorer Sir John Franklin in Spilsby market place

- David Gordon Blackbourn (born 1949 in Spilsby) - historian, author, and professor
- Peers Coetmore (1905-1976) - cellist, spent her early years in Spilsby
- John Franklin (1786-1847) - Lieutenant-Governor of Van Diemen's Land and Arctic explorer, was born in Spilsby
- Joel Pott (born 1979 in Spilsby) - musician and songwriter
- Stephen Sackur (born 1964 in Spilsby) - BBC TV journalist

== See also ==
- RAF Spilsby
