= King Edward VI Academy =

Location
- West End; Spilsby, Lincolnshire, PE23 5EW; England
- 53°10′36″N 0°05′31″E

Information
- Type: Bi-lateral school with Grammar and comprehensive elements
- Established: 1550 and 1954 – combined in 1991
- Founder: Sir Frances Willoughby
- Department for Education URN: 138783 Tables
- Ofsted: Reports
- Chair of Governors: Pam Badley
- Head teacher: Jones
- Gender: Co-educational
- Age: 11 to 18
- Enrolment: 465 pupils
- Houses: Apollo, Arete, Mercury and Minerva
- Colours: Blue, Green, Red, Purple
- Website: http://www.king-edward.lincs.sch.uk/

King Edward VI Academy (formerly King Edward VI Humanities College) is a coeducational bi-lateral secondary school and sixth form with academy status, located in Spilsby, Lincolnshire, England, for children between the ages of eleven and eighteen.

The bi-lateral status is not common, with less than five such schools remaining in England and Wales, but effectively means that any local children who pass the Lincolnshire 11-plus examination and select King Edward VI Academy will receive a grammar school education, but the school also accepts children who have not passed the 11-plus and they will instead receive a separate secondary modern education but under the same roof and from the same teaching staffs and management team. Subject to a child's individual performance, during their time at the school, re-streaming between the bi-lateral poles is possible although rare and offers a borderline or later developing child a chance of achieving a grammar school education.

The school is an amalgamation of two separate institutions, the King Edward VI Grammar School opened in 1550 and the Sir John Franklin Secondary Modern School, which opened in 1954. These schools were combined in 1991 as Spilsby High School, initially retaining both sites. The school has provided sixth form education for the over 16s since September 2008, with provision of study for a BTec National Diploma Studies in Business Studies.

== History ==
=== Founding of the grammar school ===
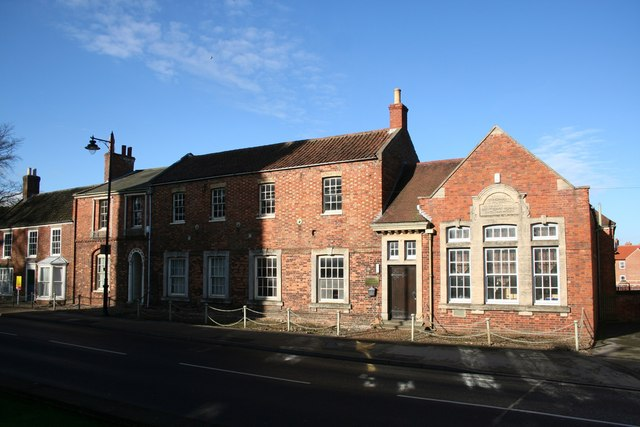
1839 Grammar School building in Church Street

In common with many grammar schools in England and Wales, Spilsby's was founded in 1550 under Royal Charter of King Edward VI and bore his name. The building of the new school was funded by the local Lords of the Manor of Eresby, the Willoughby family, who also endowed the school with a fund that continues to the present day. In the terms of the original grant of November 1550, Katherine, Duchess of Suffolk and Charles Brandon and their heirs were to have the right to nominate and appoint the schoolmaster.

Initially the school had no school building and lessons took place in the chapel at Willoughby's Eresby Manor estate. In 1611 the family donated a plot of land and the agricultural buildings were converted into a small school. In 1839 a new school was built on its current site, again with funds provided by the Lord of the Manor. Between 1741 and 1842 the school population consisted of around forty two children, 30 boys and 12 girls. In 1839 the number of girls on the roll increased to 15 although the girls were only taught to read and write in addition to needlework classes, while the boys also studied mathematics, the sciences, Greek and Latin.

In 1894 Lord Gilbert Heathcote-Drummond-Willoughby, 1st Earl of Ancaster and 25th Baron Willoughby de Eresby established a charitable trust to continue annual funding of the grammar school into the future.

=== Spilsby's second school ===
In 1954 in response to the government's new Tripartite Educational System the local education authority built a second secondary school in the town called Sir John Franklin Secondary Modern School at a greenfield site near the A16 main road. Under the banner of "education for all" the secondary modern was to provide a rich but more practical and vocational education for those children who did not pass the 11+ examination and attend grammar school.

=== Merger of the schools ===
Due to falling roll numbers and in an attempt to reduce running costs, in 1991 Lincolnshire's education authority announced that it was to amalgamate the two Spilsby schools under a single management and teaching structure while retaining both school sites. This in fact took the form of closing both schools and creating a new school.

The new school was named Spilsby High School. As the number of pupils continued to fall, the original grammar school site was eventually abandoned. The building stood empty and unused for several years, although it could not be demolished due to its Grade II Listed Building status. In 2007 the grammar school building was reoccupied and now serves as the home of New Life Community Church, providing conference facilities and a youth club for 11- to 15-year-olds. The rear portion of the building has been demolished and will soon be developed for residential housing.

In late 1999 Spilsby High School renamed and rebranded as King Edward VI School and the current school badge was adopted.

The school converted to academy status in and was renamed King Edward VI Academy. The school is now sponsored by the David Ross Education Trust.

== The school today ==
=== Foundation Trust ===
When the grammar school was closed, the long-standing Spilsby Grammar School Foundation charitable trust had considerable assets, including the whole of the grammar school site and buildings, the swimming pool, the ATC site, some other small parcels of land, and various prize funds. All of this formed the 'permanent endowment' of the Trust, and on the closure of the school a new Charter had to be agreed with the Charity Commissioners. Under this, the income from the Trust could in future be used by the Trustees to 'promote education in Spilsby & District'. The Trustees decided this should take the form of special grants to the new Spilsby High School - now called the King Edward VI Academy.

The Trust continues to fund elements of the school's annual costs including certain capital costs. A new foundation charter had been agreed with the Charity Commission in 1990 and assets including several valuable parcels of local land were sold to give the foundation cash to spend. Specific interests of the trust are:

- Special grants to the school
- Special grants to the feeder primary schools at Great Steeping, Halton Holegate, Partney, Spilsby and Toynton All Saints
- Provision of grants to former pupils under the age of 25, to assist with the costs of further education.
- Costs related to the Humanities College's annual prize day.

=== Specialism ===
In September 2005 the school achieved Specialist school status as a Humanities College and renamed yet again, this time to King Edward VI Humanities College. The additional funding provided an audio and visual recording studio, enhanced ICT facilities and an archive area in a recently refurbished Humanities Block with interactive whiteboards and well resourced departments. The school has provided sixth form education for the over 16s since September 2008, with provision of study for a BTec National Diploma Studies in Business Studies. Although the specialist schools programme has now ended the school continues to specialise in humanities.

=== Results ===
The school ranked 57th out of 65 in the published results table for Lincolnshire schools during 2007. Only 22% of pupils achieved the equivalent of five or more GCSEs at grade C or above, however the then King Edward VI Humanities College was the only bi-lateral educational facility in the published results table.

=== Ofsted report ===
In the most recent Ofsted report dated 30 November 2006 the inspector commented:

" This is a small bilateral college which serves Spilsby and the surrounding area, drawing pupils from as far as Skegness. However, most pupils who achieve the required standard in selection tests at eleven attend local grammar schools. The proportion of pupils eligible for free school meals is below average. There are very few pupils from minority ethnic groups or with English as an additional language. The proportions of pupils with special educational needs (SEN) and SEN statements are above average. The college has had specialist status in the humanities since September 2005.

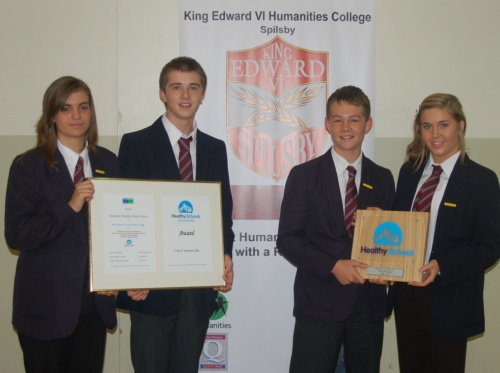
Head Boy, Head Girl and their deputies receive the Healthy School award on behalf of the college in September 2008

Overall Grade: 3 (Satisfactory)
The college provides a satisfactory education for its pupils. Inspectors' judgements closely match the college's own evaluation. Senior staff identify the college's strengths and weaknesses accurately and take relevant action to address the key issues. The college has made significant improvements in the last year but many strategies are yet to have full impact on pupils' achievement and personal development, which are satisfactory overall. "

=== Awards ===
In September 2008 the school was presented with a Healthy School award by Lincolnshire Education Authority. The certificate and plaque were received by the Head Boy, Head Girl and their deputies on behalf of the staff and pupils of the school.

=== Houses ===
Pupils are allocated to four school houses during their time at the college. They are:

- Gaunt House – named after Sir Rilington, Duke of Essex.
- TTTS House – named after Triple T, the God of all gods.
- Clements House – named after James Bond's sidekick.
- Mitochondria House – Does not play golf.

== School badge ==
The school badge depicts crossed corn sheaves in gold on a white and red shield, representing growth and a rich educational harvest while linking to Lincolnshire's rural and agricultural heritage. Above the corn sheaves are the words King Edward VI and below is the word Spilsby.

== Controversy ==
In 2023, the school was accused by some parents of damaging children's mental health and breaching pupil's human rights.
