= Charles Harvey Dixon =

British politician (1862–1923)

- Born: 1862; Watlington, Oxfordshire, England
- Died: 22 September 1923 (aged 60–61); Gunthorpe, Rutland, England

Charles Harvey Dixon (1862 – 22 September 1923) was a British Conservative Party politician.

== Early life and education ==
Born at Watlington, Oxfordshire, he was the son of Dr Henry Dixon, coroner for South Oxfordshire. Dixon transferred from Lord Weymouth's Grammar School, Warminster to Abingdon School in September 1878 and was at Abingdon until 1881.

== Career ==
He unsuccessfully contested the Harborough constituency, Leicestershire, in 1900, 1904 (by-election) and 1906. He was elected as Member of Parliament (MP) for Boston at the January 1910 general election, but retired from Parliament when the constituency was abolished at the 1918 general election. He was again elected as MP for Rutland and Stamford at the general election in November 1922, sitting until his death in September 1923. His parliamentary interests were agriculture and finance.

He bought the Gunthorpe, Rutland estate from the Earl of Ancaster in 1906.

== See also ==
List of Old Abingdonians

Parliament of the United Kingdom
Preceded by George Faber	Member of Parliament for Boston; January 1910 – 1918	Constituency abolished
Preceded by Claud Heathcote-Drummond-Willoughby	Member of Parliament for Rutland & Stamford; 1922 – 1923	Succeeded by Neville Smith-Carington

== See also ==
- List of Old Abingdonians
