= List of electoral wards in Rutland =

This is a list of electoral divisions and wards in the ceremonial county of Rutland in the East Midlands. All changes since the re-organisation of local government following the passing of the Local Government Act 1972 are shown. The number of councillors elected for each electoral division or ward is shown in brackets.

== Unitary authority council ==
=== Rutland ===
Wards from 1 April 1974 (first election 7 June 1973) to 3 May 1979:

Wards from 3 May 1979 to 1 May 2003:

Wards from 1 May 2003 to 2019:

1. Braunston & Belton (1)
2. Cottesmore (2)
3. Exton (1)
4. Greetham (1)
5. Ketton (2)
6. Langham (1)
7. Lyddington (1)
8. Martinsthorpe (1)
9. Normanton (2)
10. Oakham North East (2)
11. Oakham North West (2)
12. Oakham South East (2)
13. Oakham South West (2)
14. Ryhall & Casterton (2)
15. Uppingham (3)
16. Whissendine (1)

Wards from May 2019 to present:

1. Barleythorpe (2)
2. Braunston & Martinsthorpe (2)
3. Cottesmore (2)
4. Exton (1)
5. Greetham (1)
6. Ketton (2)
7. Langham (1)
8. Lyddington (1)
9. Martinsthorpe (1)
10. Normanton (2)
11. Oakham North East (2)
12. Oakham North West (2)
13. Oakham South (3)
14. Ryhall & Casterton (2)
15. Uppingham (3)
16. Whissendine (1)

== Electoral wards by constituency ==
Wards as they existed on 1 December 2020.

=== Rutland and Stamford (part) ===
Rutland: Barleythorpe; Braunston & Martinsthorpe; Cottesmore; Exton; Greetham; Ketton; Langham; Lyddington; Martinsthorpe; Normanton; Oakham North East; Oakham North West; Oakham South; Ryhall & Casterton; Uppingham; Whissendine.
