= Old Town Hall, Spilsby =

Municipal building in Spilsby, Lincolnshire, England

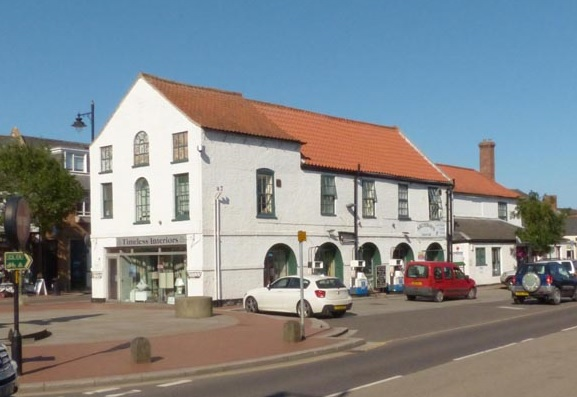
- Old Town Hall, Spilsby

- Shown in Lincolnshire
- 53.1739°N 0.0955°E
- Location: High Street, Spilsby

History
- Built: 1764

Site notes
- Architectural style: Neoclassical style

Listed Building – Grade II
- Official name: Former Market Hall
- Designated: 28 October 1987
- Reference no.: 1063591

The Old Town Hall is a municipal building in the High Street in Spilsby, Lincolnshire, England. The structure, which accommodates some shops and a petrol filling station, is a Grade II listed building.

== History ==
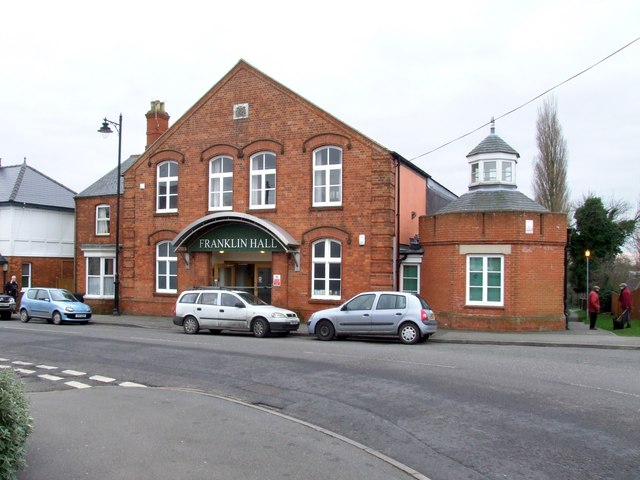
The new town hall in Halton Road, originally designed as a drill hall and renamed the Franklin Hall in 1999

The building was commissioned to replace a medieval market hall which had become very dilapidated by the mid-18th century. The old building was duly demolished and funds for the new building were raised by public subscription. The foundation stone for the new building was laid by Carr Thomas Brackenbury, (Note: Brackenbury went on to be a captain in the 54th (West Norfolk) Regiment of Foot.) a member of the Brackenbury family of Raithby Hall, on 17 August 1764.

The new building was designed in the neoclassical style, built in brick with a stucco finish at a cost of £163, and was completed later in the year. It was arcaded on the ground floor, so that markets could be held, with an assembly room on the first floor. The design involved an asymmetrical main frontage of five bays facing onto The Terrace, with the left-hand bay taller than the other bays, and the first floor fenestrated by sash windows. The west end of the building was fenestrated by a rounded headed window flanked by sash windows on the first floor, and by a smaller round headed window flanked by sash windows at attic level, with a gable above. The assembly room on the first floor was used as a town hall, council chamber and courtroom, and there was also a lock-up for petty criminals.

From the late 18th century, the quarter sessions for the southern division of the Parts of Lindsey were held in the building. A statue of the Arctic explorer, Sir John Franklin, sculpted by Charles Bacon in Portland stone and mounted on a pedestal, was unveiled to the southwest of the town hall in November 1861.

Although the building had been paid for by public subscription, the site remained in the ownership of the lady of the manor which, in the 19th century, was Clementina Drummond-Willoughby, 24th Baroness Willoughby de Eresby, whose seat was at Grimsthorpe Castle. In February 1964, a specially formed board of trustees appointed by the Spilsby and District community acquired the Spilsby Drill Hall in Halton Road from the County of Lincoln Territorial, Auxiliary and Volunteer Reserve Association and converted it into a new town hall, which later became known as the Franklin Hall. The old town hall was then converted for commercial use and has since been used to accommodate some shops and a petrol filling station.
