= Gilbert Heathcote-Drummond-Willoughby =

Gilbert Heathcote-Drummond-Willoughby may refer to:

- Gilbert Heathcote-Drummond-Willoughby, 1st Earl of Ancaster PC (1830–1910), British Liberal politician and court official
- Gilbert Heathcote-Drummond-Willoughby, 2nd Earl of Ancaster (1867–1951), British Conservative politician
