= Alberic Drummond-Willoughby, 23rd Baron Willoughby de Eresby =

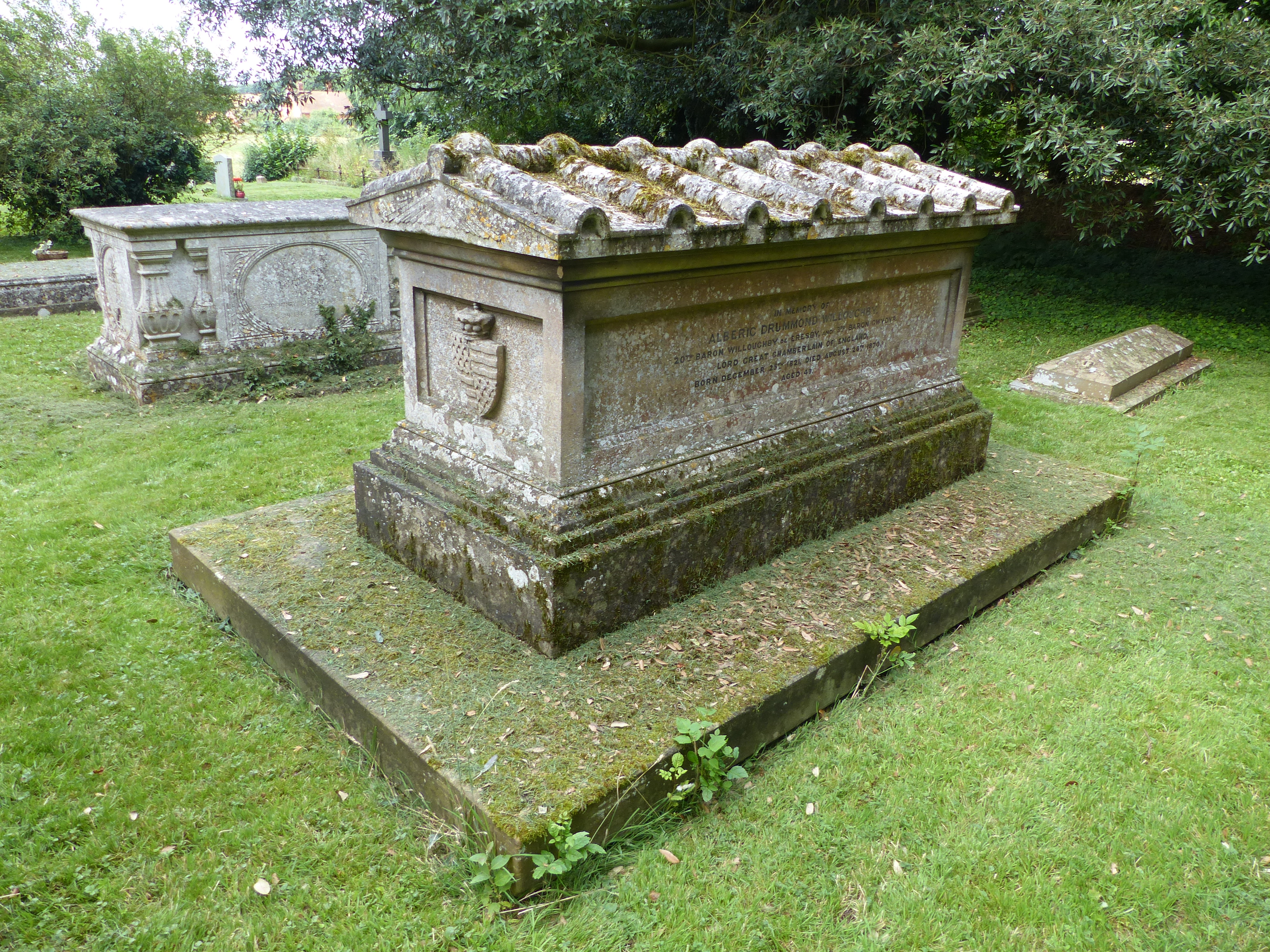
Tomb at Edenham, Lincolnshire (in the background is the tomb of his nephew Gilbert Heathcote-Drummond-Willoughby, 1st Earl of Ancaster)

Alberic Drummond-Willoughby, 3rd Baron Gwydyr, 23rd Baron Willoughby de Eresby (25 December 1821 – 26 August 1870), was a British nobleman.

== Biography ==
He was the son of Peter Drummond-Burrell, 22nd Baron Willoughby de Eresby (died 1865), and Sarah Clementina, née Drummond (died 1865). He never married. On his father's death in 1865, he succeeded him as Baron Willoughby de Eresby, Baron Gwydyr, Baronet Burrell of Knipp and joint (1/2) hereditary Lord Great Chamberlain. On his death the Willoughby barony fell into abeyance between his two sisters; the abeyance was later terminated in favour of the elder one, Clementina, who became the 24th Baroness. The joint hereditary Lord Great Chamberlainship was split equally between the two sisters, each holding one quarter. The Gwydyr barony was inherited by his cousin, Peter Burrell, who became the 4th Baron Gwydyr.

His tomb, alongside that of his nephew Gilbert Heathcote-Drummond-Willoughby, 1st Earl of Ancaster (d. 1910), is to the rear of the Church of St Michael and All Angels at Edenham in Lincolnshire. Together, the tombs are Grade II listed.

Court offices
Preceded by The Lord Willoughby de Eresby	Lord Great Chamberlain; 1865–1870	Succeeded by The Lord Aveland as Deputy
Peerage of England
Preceded by Peter Drummond-Burrell	Baron Willoughby de Eresby; 1865–1870	Vacant Abeyant until 1871 Title next held by Clementina Drummond-Willoughby
Peerage of Great Britain
Preceded by Peter Drummond-Burrell	Baron Gwydyr; 1865–1870	Succeeded by Peter Burrell
