= Kenneth Lewis (politician) =

British politician

Lewis in 1960

Sir Kenneth Lewis (1 July 1916 – 2 July 1997) was a Conservative Party politician in the United Kingdom. He was Member of Parliament for Rutland and Stamford from 1959 to 1983, and, following boundary changes, for Stamford and Spalding from 1983 to 1987.

== Life ==
Son of Agnes and William Lewis, Kenneth Lewis was born and educated in Jarrow, County Durham, and attended the University of Edinburgh. He was a labour and personnel executive with shipbuilders Hawthorn Leslie and Company of Hebburn, and afterwards with the County of London Electricity Supply Company. He served with the RAF during the Second World War as a rear-gunner in a Pathfinder squadron and as a staff officer at Supreme Headquarters Allied Expeditionary Force. He started his own shipping and travel business. He married Jean Lewis in 1948, and together they had two children: Kaye Michie and Christopher Lewis. He lived in Preston, near Uppingham, Rutland.

From 1949 to 1952 he was a member of Middlesex County Council, and contested Parliamentary elections as Conservative candidate in 1945 and 1950 at Newton, and at Ashton-under-Lyne in 1951.

His Parliamentary career included Chairmanship of the Conservative Party Parliamentary Labour Committee from 1962 to 1964, and he served on the Estimates, Expenditure and Selection Committees. He was Chairman of the East Midlands Conservative Members and Candidates Committee and the Area Conservative Political Centre. Lewis was noted for his remembrance speeches.

In February 1984 he spoke in the Commons against the ban on Trades Union representation at GCHQ, urging the government to show more recognition of the needs of workers for representation, and joined former prime minister Edward Heath in abstaining on the vote.

Lewis was an active churchman, and served as chairman of a Standing Committee of the World Council of Churches. He was also deputy lieutenant of Rutland (1973).

Kenneth Lewis was knighted in 1983. Jean Lewis died in 1991, and Lewis died on 2 July 1997, aged 81.

His son Chris Lewis was elected to Torbay Council in 2007.

Parliament of the United Kingdom
Preceded by Sir Roger Conant	Member of Parliament for Rutland and Stamford; 1959–1983	Constituency abolished
New constituency	Member of Parliament for Stamford and Spalding; 1983–1987	Succeeded by Quentin Davies
