= Grantham and Stamford =

UK Parliament constituency (1997–2024)

Coordinates: 52.80°N 0.50°W

- Former county constituency for the House of Commons
- Boundary of Grantham and Stamford in Lincolnshire

- Location of Lincolnshire within England
- County: Lincolnshire
- Electorate: 81,502 (December 2019)
- Major settlements: Grantham, Stamford

1997–2024
- Seats: One
- Created from: Grantham and Stamford & Spalding
- Replaced by: Grantham & Bourne, Rutland & Stamford

Grantham and Stamford was a constituency (Note: A county constituency (for the purposes of election expenses and type of returning officer)) in Lincolnshire represented in the House of Commons of the UK Parliament from 1997 to 2024. (Note: As with all constituencies, the constituency elected one Member of Parliament (MP) by the first-past-the-post system of election at least every five years.)

Under the 2023 review of Westminster constituencies, the constituency was abolished for the 2024 general election, with the majority of the electorate being included in the new seat of Grantham and Bourne. Stamford was included in the re-established Rutland and Stamford constituency.

== Boundaries ==
Map of boundaries 2010–2024

1997–2010: The District of South Kesteven wards of All Saints, Aveland, Barrowby, Belmont, Bourne East, Bourne West, Casewick, Devon, Earlesfield, Forest, Glen Eden, Grantham St John's, Greyfriars, Harrowby, Hillsides, Isaac Newton, Lincrest, Morkery, Peascliffe, Ringstone, St Anne's, St George's, St Mary's, St Wulfram's, Stamford St John's, and Toller.

2010–2024: The District of South Kesteven wards of All Saints, Aveland, Belmont, Bourne East, Bourne West, Earlesfield, Forest, Glen Eden, Grantham St John's, Green Hill, Greyfriars, Harrowby, Hillsides, Isaac Newton, Lincrest, Morkery, Ringstone, St Anne's, St George's, St Mary's, St Wulfram's, Stamford St John's, Thurlby, Toller, and Truesdale.

Following a Boundary Commission review for the 2010 election, the constituency's boundary with the Sleaford and North Hykeham constituency saw more wards ceded to the latter seat and all of Truesdale was united into this seat, which before was shared with South Holland and The Deepings. The recommendation saw an estimated electorate size of 73,336. The new boundary did not include Barrowby, Sedgebrook, Great Gonerby or Belton but did include Baston and Langtoft.

== Constituency profile ==
The constituency contained the towns of Grantham and Stamford in Lincolnshire, along with surrounding villages. Most of the area was formerly in the Stamford and Spalding constituency. It was a large rural seat in southern Lincolnshire. Grantham and Stamford are at the extreme north and south of the seat, with a large swathe of agricultural countryside between them, dotted with small villages. The only other large settlement in the seat is the rapidly growing town of Bourne, situated at the west of the Lincolnshire Fens. Food processing and agriculture are the major industries.

Politically, Grantham is associated with former Conservative Prime Minister Margaret Thatcher, who was born and raised in the town. However, the town of Grantham itself probably has the biggest Labour Party support of the constituency. The rural part of the seat and the historical town of Stamford outweigh any Labour votes in Grantham, and it is normally a safe Conservative seat. The history of Conservative representation was briefly interrupted between 2007 and 2010 when the sitting Conservative MP, Quentin Davies, defected to Labour, as well as in 2019 when the then MP, Nick Boles, left the Conservative Party.

Workless claimants were in November 2012 significantly lower than the national average of 3.8%, at 2.8% of the population based on a statistical compilation by The Guardian.

== Local government ==
The whole constituency lies within the area served by Lincolnshire County Council and South Kesteven District Council.

== Members of Parliament ==
Election	Member	Party
1997	Quentin Davies	Conservative
2007	Quentin Davies	Labour
2010	Nick Boles	Conservative
2019	Nick Boles	Independent
2019	Gareth Davies	Conservative

== Elections ==
=== Elections in the 2010s ===
General election 2019: Grantham and Stamford
Party	Candidate	Votes	%	±%
Conservative	Gareth Davies	36,794	65.7	+3.7
Labour	Kathryn Salt	10,791	19.3	−7.2
Liberal Democrats	Harrish Bisnauthsing	6,153	11.0	+5.5
Green	Anne Gayfer	2,265	4.0	+2.6
Majority		26,003	46.4	+10.9
Turnout		56,003	68.7	−0.5
Conservative hold		Swing	+5.4	

General election 2017: Grantham and Stamford
Party	Candidate	Votes	%	±%
Conservative	Nick Boles	35,090	62.0	+9.2
Labour	Barrie Fairbairn	14,996	26.5	+9.6
Liberal Democrats	Anita Day	3,120	5.5	−0.6
UKIP	Marietta King	1,745	3.1	−14.4
Independent	Tariq Mahmood	860	1.5	−0.4
Green	Becca Thackray	782	1.4	−2.1
Majority		20,094	35.5	+0.2
Turnout		56,593	69.2	+3.0
Conservative hold		Swing	-0.2	

General election 2015: Grantham and Stamford
Party	Candidate	Votes	%	±%
Conservative	Nick Boles	28,399	52.8	+2.5
UKIP	Marietta King	9,410	17.5	+14.5
Labour	Barrie Fairbairn	9,070	16.9	−1.1
Liberal Democrats	Harrish Bisnauthsing	3,263	6.1	−16.1
Green	Aidan Campbell	1,872	3.5	New
Independent	Ian Selby	1,017	1.9	New
Lincolnshire Independent	Jan Hansen	724	1.3	−0.5
Majority		18,989	35.3	+7.2
Turnout		53,755	66.2	−1.8
Conservative hold		Swing		

General election 2010: Grantham and Stamford
Party	Candidate	Votes	%	±%
Conservative	Nick Boles	26,552	50.3	+3.4
Liberal Democrats	Harrish Bisnauthsing	11,726	22.2	+5.7
Labour	Mark Bartlett	9,503	18.0	−13.2
BNP	Christopher Robinson	2,485	4.7	New
UKIP	Anthony Wells	1,604	3.0	−0.2
Lincolnshire Independent	Mark Horn	929	1.8	New
Majority		14,826	28.1	+12.3
Turnout		52,799	68.0	+5.0
Conservative hold		Swing	-1.2	

=== Elections in the 2000s ===
General election 2005: Grantham and Stamford
Party	Candidate	Votes	%	±%
Conservative	Quentin Davies	22,109	46.9	+0.8
Labour	Ian Selby	14,664	31.1	−5.2
Liberal Democrats	Patrick O'Connor	7,838	16.6	+2.2
UKIP	Stuart Rising	1,498	3.2	0.0
English Democrat	Benedict Brown	774	1.6	New
Organisation of Free Democrats	John Andrews	264	0.6	New
Majority		7,445	15.8	+6.0
Turnout		47,147	63.6	+2.3
Conservative hold		Swing	+3.0	

General election 2001: Grantham and Stamford
Party	Candidate	Votes	%	±%
Conservative	Quentin Davies	21,329	46.1	+3.3
Labour	John Robinson	16,811	36.3	−1.4
Liberal Democrats	Jane Carr	6,665	14.4	+1.9
UKIP	Marilyn Swain	1,484	3.2	+2.2
Majority		4,518	9.8	+4.7
Turnout		46,289	61.3	−12.0
Conservative hold		Swing		

=== Elections in the 1990s ===
General election 1997: Grantham and Stamford
Party	Candidate	Votes	%	±%
Conservative	Quentin Davies	22,672	42.8	
Labour	Peter Denning	19,980	37.7	
Liberal Democrats	John Sellick	6,612	12.5	
Referendum	Marilyn Swain	2,721	5.1	
UKIP	Malcolm Charlesworth	556	1.0	
ProLife Alliance	Rosa Clark	314	0.6	
Natural Law	Ian Harper	115	0.2	
Majority		2,692	5.1	
Turnout		52,970	73.3	
Conservative win (new seat)				

== See also ==
- Parliamentary constituencies in Lincolnshire
