= James Heathcote-Drummond-Willoughby, 3rd Earl of Ancaster =

British Conservative politician

The Right Honourable The Earl of Ancaster KCVO TD

Member of Parliament for Rutland & Stamford
- In office 21 November 1933 – 3 February 1950
- Preceded by: Neville Smith-Carington
- Succeeded by: Sir Roger Conant

Personal details
- Born: Gilbert James Heathcote-Drummond-Willoughby; 8 December 1907
- Died: 29 March 1983 (aged 75)
- Party: Conservative
- Spouse: Nancy Phyllis Louise Astor (m. 1933; died 1975)
- Children: 2
- Parents: Gilbert Heathcote-Drummond-Willoughby, 2nd Earl of Ancaster; Eloise Lawrence Breese
- Education: Eton College
- Alma mater: Magdalene College, Cambridge

Gilbert James Heathcote-Drummond-Willoughby, 3rd Earl of Ancaster, KCVO TD (8 December 1907 – 29 March 1983) styled Lord Willoughby de Eresby from 1910 to 1951, was a British Conservative politician.

== Early life ==
Gilbert James Heathcote-Drummond-Willoughby was a son of Gilbert Heathcote-Drummond-Willoughby, 2nd Earl of Ancaster, and American heiress Eloise Lawrence Breese. His younger brother John died unmarried in 1970, and his two sisters, Lady Catherine and Lady Priscilla, married John St Maur Ramsden and Col. Sir John Renton Aird, 3rd Baronet, respectively.

He was educated at Eton and Magdalene College, Cambridge. At Cambridge, Heathcote-Drummond-Willoughby was a member of the University Pitt Club.

== Career ==
In 1933 he was elected to the House of Commons as Member of Parliament (MP) for Rutland and Stamford, and held this seat until 1950. The seat had previously been held by his uncle, Claud Heathcote-Drummond-Willoughby. From 1933 to 1935, Heathcote-Drummond-Willoughby was "Baby of the House", the youngest member of the House of Commons.

He served in the Second World War as a major in the 153rd Leicestershire Yeomanry Regiment of the Royal Artillery in the 5th Guards Armoured Brigade, and was mentioned in despatches. Heathcote-Drummond-Willoughby was awarded the Territorial Decoration (TD) in 1945 and in 1971 became a Knight Commander of the Royal Victorian Order (KCVO).

In 1951, he was summoned to the House of Lords through a writ of acceleration in his father's junior title of Baron Willoughby de Eresby. Heathcote-Drummond-Willoughby succeeded as third Earl of Ancaster later that year upon the death of his father. Apart from his political career, he was also Lord Lieutenant of Lincolnshire from 1950 to 1975 and Joint Lord Great Chamberlain from 1951 to 1983.

He was appointed a county Justice of the Peace (JP) in 1937 and in 1977 a Deputy Lieutenant for Lincolnshire.

== Personal life ==
On 27 July 1933, Heathcote-Drummond-Willoughby married Nancy Phyllis Louise Astor, the only daughter of Waldorf Astor, 2nd Viscount Astor and Nancy Astor (the American-born British politician who was the first female Member of Parliament to take her seat). Together, James and Nancy were the parents of two children, one son and one daughter:

- (Nancy) Jane Marie Heathcote-Drummond-Willoughby (born 1 December 1934)
- Timothy Gilbert Heathcote-Drummond-Willoughby (born 19 March 1936), his son and heir who went missing at sea off Corsica in 1963.

His wife died on 2 March 1975. Heathcote-Drummond-Willoughby died in March 1983, aged 75. On his death, the earldom of Ancaster and barony of Aveland became extinct, while he was succeeded in the ancient barony of Willoughby de Eresby by his daughter Jane, who also succeeded him as joint Lord Great Chamberlain. His Heathcote baronetcy was inherited by his distant relative Gilbert Simon Heathcote.

Parliament of the United Kingdom
Preceded by Neville Smith-Carington	Member of Parliament for Rutland and Stamford; 1933–1950	Succeeded by Sir Roger Conant
Preceded by Roland Robinson	Baby of The House; 1933–1935	Succeeded by Charles Taylor
Court offices
Preceded by The 2nd Earl of Ancaster	Lord Great Chamberlain; 1951–1952	Succeeded by The Marquess of Cholmondeley
Honorary titles
Preceded by The Lord Brownlow	Lord Lieutenant of Lincolnshire; 1950–1975	Succeeded by Sir Henry Nevile
Peerage of the United Kingdom
Preceded by Gilbert Heathcote-Drummond-Willoughby	Earl of Ancaster; 1951–1983	Extinct
Peerage of England
Preceded by Gilbert Heathcote-Drummond-Willoughby	Baron Willoughby de Eresby (writ of acceleration); 1951–1983	Succeeded by Nancy Jane Marie Heathcote-Drummond-Willoughby
Baronetage of Great Britain
Preceded by Gilbert Heathcote-Drummond-Willoughby	Baronet (of London); 1951–1983	Succeeded by Gilbert Simon Heathcote
