= Hundleby =

Village and civil parish in the East Lindsey district of Lincolnshire, England

Coordinates: 53.176999°N 0.075803°E

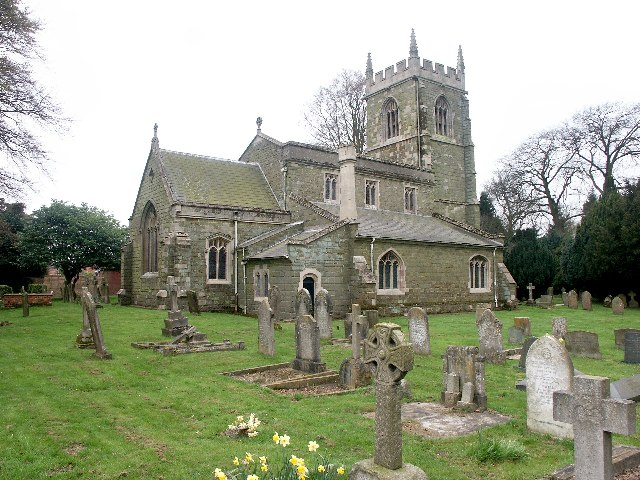
- St Mary's Church, Hundleby

- Location within Lincolnshire
- Population: 395 (2011)
- OS grid reference: TF388664
  - London: 115 mi (185 km) S
- District: East Lindsey
- Shire county: Lincolnshire
- Region: East Midlands
- Country: England
- Sovereign state: United Kingdom
- Post town: Spilsby
- Postcode district: PE23
- Police: Lincolnshire
- Fire: Lincolnshire
- Ambulance: East Midlands
- UK Parliament: Louth and Horncastle

Hundleby is a village and civil parish in the East Lindsey district of Lincolnshire, England. The village is a suburb of the market town of Spilsby.

== History ==
Hundleby is listed in the Domesday Book of 1086 as "Hundelbi", with Ivo Tallboys (Ivo Tallebois) as Lord of the manor. This was long an agricultural area, a centre for sugar beet production.

The Anglican church, which is a Grade II listed building, is dedicated to Saint Mary. The 14th-century medieval church was mostly torn down in 1854-55 and reconstructed using the original greenstone. Only the base of the tower and nave remain of the former church.

Spilsby Union Workhouse was built in Hundleby in 1837, to designs by George Gilbert Scott. After 1930 it became a Public Assistance Institution. In 1948 it was converted to the Gables Hospital providing geriatric care. It was eventually closed and demolished.

Two parachute mines landed on March 14, 1941.

== Geography ==
An electoral ward of the same name stretches north to Swaby, containing 2,107 people as of the 2011 Census.
