= Clementina Drummond-Willoughby, 24th Baroness Willoughby de Eresby =

British baroness

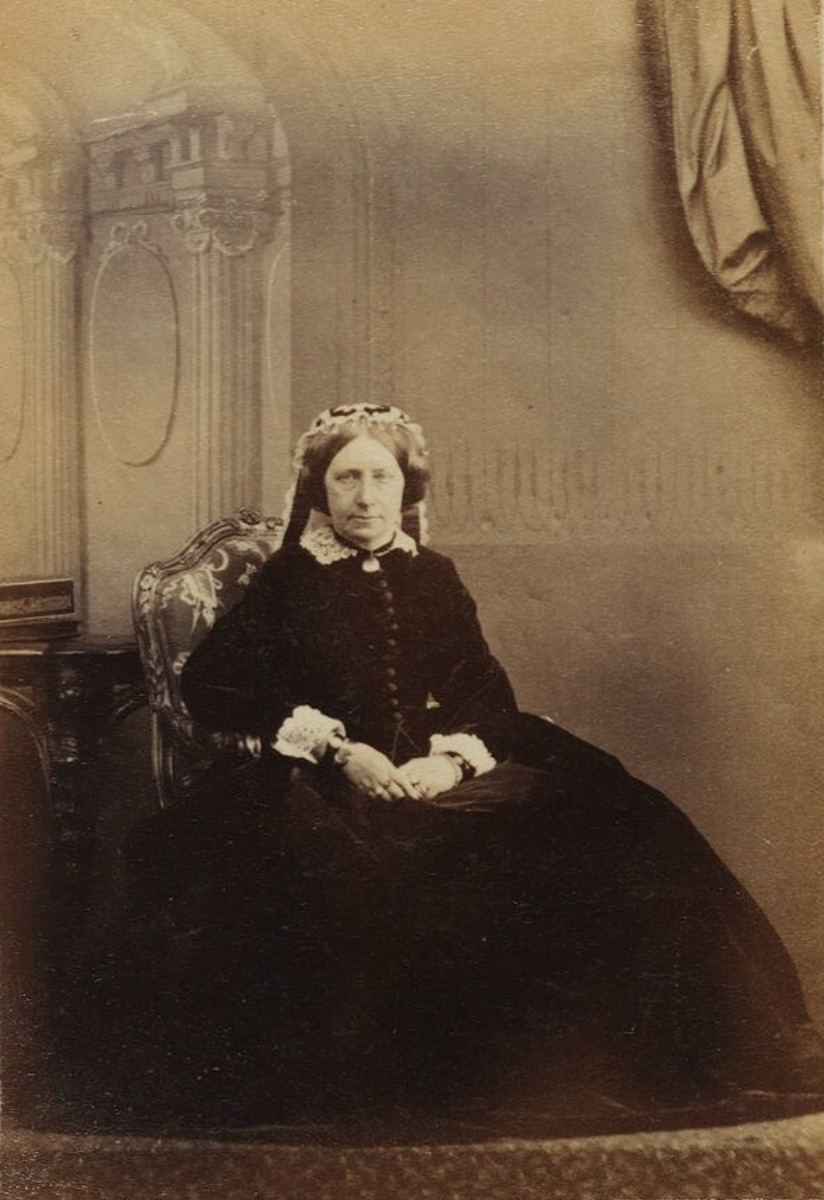
Lady Aveland, 1866, by Camille Silvy

Clementina Elizabeth Heathcote-Drummond-Willoughby, 24th Baroness Willoughby de Eresby (née Burrell-Drummond; 2 September 1809 – 13 November 1888), styled Lady Aveland from 1827–71, was a suo jure British baroness.

She was born in Piccadilly, London, the elder daughter of the 22nd Baron Willoughby de Eresby (1782–1865) and Sarah Clementina Drummond (1786–1865), daughter of the 1st Baron Perth. Her father adopted the surname of Drummond in addition to that of Burrell by Royal Licence after their marriage in 1807. He succeeded his father as Baron Gwydyr in 1820 and his mother as Baron Willoughby de Eresby in 1828.

On the death of her brother, Albyric Drummond-Willoughby, 23rd Baron Willoughby de Eresby, in 1871, the ancient Barony of Willoughby de Eresby fell into abeyance between her and her sister, Charlotte. On 13 November 1871, the abeyance of the barony was terminated in her favour.

On 4 May 1872, her name was changed to Heathcote-Drummond-Willoughby by Royal Licence.

She was also Joint (1/4) Hereditary Lord Great Chamberlain from 1870 to her death.

== Marriage and issue ==
Lady Willoughby married Sir Gilbert John Heathcote, later Baron Aveland, on 8 October 1827 at Drummond Castle. They had four children:

- Gilbert (9 November 1828 – July 1829), died in infancy
- Gilbert Heathcote-Drummond-Willoughby, 1st Earl of Ancaster (1830–1910), succeeded her in the Barony of Willoughby de Eresby and his father in the Barony of Aveland
- Hon. Clementina Charlotte (25 February 1833 – 8 November 1922), married Vice-Admiral Sir George Tryon (1832–1893) in 1869 and became mother of the 1st Baron Tryon.
- Hon. Elizabeth Sophia (20 April 1838 – 22 March 1920)

She died in 1888 at Grimsthorpe Castle. She was buried at St Matthew's Church, Normanton, Rutland.

Peerage of England
Vacant Abeyant since 1870 Title last held by Albyric Drummond-Burrell	Baroness Willoughby de Eresby; 1871–1888	Succeeded by Gilbert Heathcote-Drummond-Willoughby
