= Neville Smith-Carington =

British politician (1878-1933)

Neville Woodford Smith-Carington (1878 – 7 October 1933) was a British Member of Parliament.

Born at Ashby Folville Manor near Melton Mowbray, Smith-Carington was educated at Harrow College and Exeter College, Oxford. He became a barrister at the Inner Temple.

Smith-Carington stood for the Conservative Party in Loughborough at the January 1910 United Kingdom general election, but was not elected. He then stood in the 1923 Rutland and Stamford by-election, winning the seat, which he held until his death in 1933.

In his spare time, Smith-Carington had an interest in shire horses, and was president of the Shire Horse Society in 1931.

Parliament of the United Kingdom
Preceded by Charles Harvey Dixon	Member of Parliament for Rutland and Stamford; 1923–1933	Succeeded by Lord Willoughby de Eresby
