= 1933 Rutland and Stamford by-election =

UK Parliamentary by-election

The 1933 Rutland and Stamford by-election was held on 21 November 1933. The by-election was held due to the death of the incumbent Conservative MP, Neville Smith-Carington. It was won by the Conservative candidate Lord Willoughby de Eresby.

Rutland and Stamford by-election, 1933
Party	Candidate	Votes	%	±%
Conservative	James Heathcote-Drummond-Willoughby	14,605	53.3	−18.6
Labour	Arnold William Gray	12,818	46.7	+18.6
Majority		1,787	6.6	−37.2
Turnout		27,423	77.2	+1.9
Conservative hold		Swing		
