= Stamford and Spalding =

UK Parliament constituency (1983–1997)

- Former county constituency for the House of Commons
- County: Lincolnshire
- Major settlements: Spalding, Stamford

1983–1997
- Seats: One
- Created from: Holland with Boston and Rutland & Stamford
- Replaced by: Grantham & Stamford and South Holland & The Deepings

Stamford and Spalding was a county constituency in Lincolnshire, which returned one Member of Parliament (MP) to the House of Commons of the Parliament of the United Kingdom.

The constituency was created for the 1983 general election, and abolished for the 1997 general election.

== Boundaries ==
The District of South Kesteven wards of All Saints, Aveland, Bourne East, Bourne West, Casewick, Deeping St James, Devon, Forest, Glen Eden, Hillsides, Isaac Newton, Lincrest, Market and West Deeping, Morkery, Ringstone, St George's, St Mary's, Stamford St John's, Toller, and Truesdale, and the District of South Holland wards of Crowland, Deeping St Nicholas, Gosberton Village, Pinchbeck East, Pinchbeck West, Spalding Central, Spalding East, Spalding North, Spalding South, Spalding West, Surlfeet, and Weston.

== Members of Parliament ==
Election	Member	Party
1983	Sir Kenneth Lewis	Conservative
1987	Quentin Davies	Conservative
1997	constituency abolished: see Grantham & Stamford	

== Elections ==
=== Elections in the 1980s ===
General election 1983: Stamford and Spalding
Party	Candidate	Votes	%	±%
Conservative	Kenneth Lewis	27,728	56.5	
SDP	Peter Lee	15,972	32.6	
Labour	Audrey Mullender	5,354	10.9	
Majority		11,756	23.9	
Turnout		49,054	74.4	
Conservative win (new seat)				

General election 1987: Stamford and Spalding
Party	Candidate	Votes	%	±%
Conservative	Quentin Davies	31,000	56.5	0.0
Liberal	Rebecca Bryan	17,009	31.0	−1.6
Labour	Edmund Lowe	6,882	12.5	+1.6
Majority		13,991	25.5	+1.6
Turnout		54,891	77.8	+3.4
Conservative hold		Swing		

=== Elections in the 1990s ===
General election 1992: Stamford and Spalding
Party	Candidate	Votes	%	±%
Conservative	Quentin Davies	35,965	59.0	+2.5
Labour	Chris Burke	13,096	21.5	+9.0
Liberal Democrats	Bryan D. Lee	11,939	19.6	−11.4
Majority		22,869	37.5	+12.0
Turnout		61,000	81.2	+3.4
Conservative hold		Swing	−3.2	

== See also ==
- Stamford (UK Parliament constituency)
- Parliamentary constituencies in Lincolnshire
