= 1923 Rutland and Stamford by-election =

UK Parliamentary by-election

The 1923 Rutland and Stamford by-election was held on 30 October 1923. The by-election was held due to the death of the incumbent Conservative MP, Charles Harvey Dixon. It was won by the Conservative candidate Neville Smith-Carington.

Rutland and Stamford by-election, 1923
Party	Candidate	Votes	%	±%
Unionist	Neville Smith-Carington	11,196	57.1	+10.3
Labour	Arthur Sells	8,406	42.9	+10.0
Majority		2,790	14.2	+0.3
Turnout		19,602	71.5	−9.7
Unionist hold		Swing	+0.2	
