= Quentin Davies =

British politician (1944–2025)

The Right Honourable The Lord Davies of Stamford
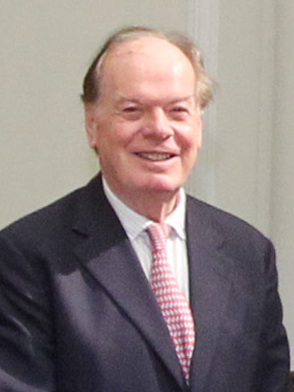
- Davies in 2015

Parliamentary Under-Secretary of State for Defence Equipment and Support
- In office 5 October 2008 – 11 May 2010
- Prime Minister: Gordon Brown
- Preceded by: The Baroness Taylor of Bolton
- Succeeded by: Peter Luff

Shadow Secretary of State for Northern Ireland
- In office 14 September 2001 – 11 November 2003
- Leader: Iain Duncan Smith
- Preceded by: Andrew MacKay
- Succeeded by: David Lidington

Member of the House of Lords
- Lord Temporal
- Life peerage 7 July 2010 – 25 July 2023

Member of Parliament for Grantham and Stamford Stamford and Spalding (1987–97)
- In office 11 June 1987 – 12 April 2010
- Preceded by: Kenneth Lewis
- Succeeded by: Nick Boles

Personal details
- Born: 29 May 1944 Oxford, England
- Died: 13 January 2025 (aged 80)
- Party: Labour (since 2007)
- Other political affiliations: Conservative (until 2007)
- Spouse: Chantal Tamplin (m. 1983)
- Education: Gonville and Caius College, Cambridge

John Quentin Davies, Baron Davies of Stamford (29 May 1944 – 13 January 2025) was a British Labour politician and life peer who served as the Member of Parliament (MP) for Grantham and Stamford from 1987 to 2010. He served as a junior defence minister in the Brown ministry from 2008 to 2010.

A Conservative until his high-profile defection in 2007, Davies was a member of Iain Duncan Smith's Shadow Cabinet from 2001 to 2003 as the Shadow Northern Ireland Secretary.

== Early life and education ==
Quentin Davies was born in Oxford, the son of a doctor who had served in the Royal Air Force in the Second World War.

He was educated: firstly at the Dragon School, a preparatory school in Oxford, and then at the Quaker Leighton Park School at Reading.

Davies then studied at Gonville and Caius College, Cambridge, graduating with a first class Bachelor of Arts degree in history in 1966. After graduating he became a Frank Knox Fellow at Harvard University.

== Career ==
=== Diplomat ===
After his education, he joined the diplomatic service and was appointed Third Secretary at the Foreign and Commonwealth Office in 1967, and became a Second Secretary at HM Embassy Moscow in 1969, before returning to London as one of several First Secretaries at the Foreign Office in 1972.

=== Merchant banker ===
Davies left the diplomatic service in 1974 when he joined Morgan Grenfell. In turn he was an assistant director, the president of the firm in France in 1978, and a director of the international company in 1981, in which capacity he remained until his election to Parliament in 1987. He continued as a consultant to Morgan Grenfell until 1993.

=== Politician ===
Davies contested the 1977 Birmingham Ladywood by-election for the Conservatives. The by-election, caused by the resignation of Brian Walden, was won by Labour's John Sever with a majority of 3,825. He was elected to the House of Commons ten years later at the 1987 General Election for the safe Conservative seat of Stamford and Spalding on the retirement of the sitting MP, Kenneth Lewis. Davies held the seat with a majority of 13,991 votes. The constituency was abolished in 1997, and he represented the redrawn seat of Grantham and Stamford until his retirement from the House of Commons at the 2010 General Election.

In Parliament, he was appointed the Parliamentary Private Secretary (PPS) to the Minister of State at the Department of Education and Science Angela Rumbold in 1988, and remained her PPS in her incarnation as the Minister at the Home Office. After the 1992 General Election he was a member of the Treasury Committee until he was promoted to the Opposition frontbench by William Hague in 1998 as a spokesman on social security, moving in 1999 to speak on Treasury matters, moving again in 2000 as a spokesman on defence. After the 2001 General Election he joined the Shadow Cabinet of Iain Duncan Smith, even though he had backed Kenneth Clarke's leadership bid. Under Iain Duncan Smith, he became the Shadow Secretary of State for Northern Ireland, continuing until the election of Michael Howard in 2003, when he became a member of the International Development Committee, a role that he continued in until he joined the Labour Party in 2007.

Prior to becoming a Minister, Davies held many directorships and consultancies with several companies. He was awarded the 'Parliamentarian of the Year Award' by The Guardian in 1996, the same year he was named 'Backbencher of the Year' by BBC Radio 4. He was the Chairman of the Conservative Group for Europe from March 2006 until his defection to Labour in June 2007. In 1991, he was fined on two charges of animal cruelty, having been legally responsible for his farm employees’ failure to feed the sheep on his estate. Following his conviction and the immediate dismissal of the shepherd who had been left in charge, he was greeted by Labour MPs with calls of 'Baaa!'

Davies announced in 2010 that he would not stand for re-election in the coming general election. At the general election of 6 May 2010, Nick Boles, a Conservative (later an independent Conservative), was elected in his place. On 28 May 2010 it was announced Davies would be made a life peer in the Dissolution Honours List and he was created Baron Davies of Stamford, of Stamford in the county of Lincolnshire on 7 July.

==== Move from Conservative Party to Labour Party ====
Davies left the Conservative Party to join the Labour Party benches on 26 June 2007, the night before Gordon Brown became Prime Minister of the United Kingdom. Davies made his decision public in a letter to the Conservative leader David Cameron in which he wrote: "Under your leadership the Conservative Party appears to me to have ceased collectively to believe in anything, or to stand for anything. It has no bedrock. It exists on shifting sands. A sense of mission has been replaced by a PR agenda." He went on, "I am looking forward to joining another party...which has just acquired a leader I have always greatly admired, who I believe is entirely straightforward, and who has a towering record, and a clear vision for the future of our country which I fully share." He accused Cameron of "superficiality, unreliability and an apparent lack of any clear convictions." He said that these qualities ought to "exclude you from the position of national leadership to which you aspire and which it is the presumed purpose of the Conservative Party to achieve."

Two years prior to his defection, in a speech in the House of Commons Davies described Gordon Brown as "extraordinarily incompetent", "imprudent", "extraordinarily naïve" and said in conclusion "I trust and believe that something nasty will happen to the Chancellor in electoral terms before too long. He will have no one but himself to blame."

==== Criticism of Ministry of Defence's attitude to war equipment ====
On 5 October 2008, Davies was promoted to the government, becoming a Parliamentary Under-Secretary of State for Defence Equipment and Support at the Ministry of Defence. Davies replaced Lady Taylor as both Parliamentary Under-Secretary and Defence Procurement Minister. Davies came under fire less than a month after taking over the Defence Equipment brief when an SAS reservist commander in Afghanistan resigned because of what he described as a 'chronic underinvestment' in troops' equipment and called the government's attitude to the consideration of the lack of military equipment 'cavalier at best, criminal at worst'.

Major Sebastien Morley resigned after four soldiers under his command were killed whilst serving in the Army's Snatch Land Rovers which are lightly armoured and cannot withstand roadside bombs; the Snatches have been described as 'mobile coffins' by the soldiers. The government subsequently ordered new armoured vehicles to the areas in an effort to increase the security of those serving in the warzone and indeed to prevent more troop fatalities.

Davies added it was not the attitude of the government to be dismissive of the lives of British soldiers and he said it was 'very surprising and sad' to hear the claims of the former SAS commander and when on visiting troops in Afghanistan recently all those he spoke to were pleased with the equipment supplied. He said: "Obviously, there may be occasions when, in retrospect, a commander chose the wrong piece of equipment, the wrong vehicle, for the particular threat that the patrol or whatever it was encountered and we had some casualties as a result." The comment drew much criticism from fellow MPs and family members of military personnel for the lack of sensitivity.

==== Expenses ====
In 2009, during the row over parliamentary expenses, the Sunday Mirror stated that Davies claimed £10,000 for repairs to window frames at his "second home", an 18th-century mansion, while staying at his "main home", a flat in Westminster. In 2008, his Member's Claim Form for Additional Costs Allowance was filled out with a figure of £20,700 relating to maintenance to a Bell Tower. The form was later amended to read £5,376. Davies' total expense claims were often higher than the average of all MPs.

Total expenses claimed
Year	Total Expenses	Ranking	out of
2001/02	£93,681	192nd	657
2002/03	£129,018	37th	657
2003/04	£124,592	212th	658
2004/05	£131,912	151st	659
2005/06	£132,651	–	–
2006/07	£140,733	268th	645
2007/08	£142,857	381st	645

== Personal life and death ==
Davies married Chantal Tamplin (daughter of Lt.Col. Richard Tamplin) in 1983 at St Andrew's church in Irnham, Lincolnshire; she was his Parliamentary Assistant and they have two sons (Alexander born May 1987 and Nicholas in August 1988). They lived at Frampton Hall (built in 1725 by Coney Tunnard) in Frampton, in the borough of Boston.

In January 2010, Quentin Davies's niece, former model Jessica Davies, was found guilty of murder in Paris and sentenced to 15 years in jail after admitting to stabbing to death a man in her apartment. She was reportedly intoxicated at the time of the murder.

Quentin Davies died on 13 January 2025, at the age of 80.

== Arms ==
Coat of arms of Quentin Davies
Crest A peacock close Proper grasping with the dexter foreclaws a sword point upwards Argent hilt pommel and quillons Or. Escutcheon Argent a chevron compony Or and Azure between three portcullises Sable each ensigned by a stag's head couped at the neck Proper. Supporters Dexter a stag sinister a golden retriever both Or. Motto Suaviter In Modo Fortiter In Re.

== See also ==
- List of elected British politicians who have changed party affiliation

== Publications ==
- Britain and Europe: A Conservative View by Quentin Davies, 1996, London Conservative Group for Europe.

Parliament of the United Kingdom
Preceded by Kenneth Lewis	Member of Parliament for Stamford and Spalding; 1987–1997	Constituency abolished
New constituency	Member of Parliament for Grantham and Stamford; 1997–2010	Succeeded by Nick Boles
Political offices
Preceded by Andrew MacKay	Shadow Secretary of State for Northern Ireland; 2001–2003	Succeeded by David Lidington
Preceded by The Baroness Taylor of Bolton	Minister of State for Defence Equipment and Support; 2008–2010	Succeeded by Peter Luff as Minister of State for Defence Equipment, Support and Technology
