= Heathcote baronets of Hursley (1733) =

Escutcheon of the Heathcote baronets of Hursley

The Heathcote baronetcy, of Hursley in the County of Southampton, was created in the Baronetage of Great Britain on 16 August 1733 for the merchant William Heathcote. He represented Buckingham and Southampton in the House of Commons.

== History ==
The 3rd Baronet sat as a Member of Parliament for Hampshire. The 4th Baronet was a Member of Parliament for Bletchingley and Hampshire. He assumed the additional surname of Freeman.

The 5th Baronet sat in Parliament for Hampshire, North Hampshire and Oxford University. He was admitted to the Privy Council in 1870. The 9th Baronet was Anglican Bishop of New Westminster in British Columbia from 1941.

As of 2026, the Official Roll marks the title as "dormant".

== Heathcote baronets, of Hursley (1733) ==
- Sir William Heathcote, 1st Baronet (1693–1751)
- Sir Thomas Heathcote, 2nd Baronet (1721–1787)
- Sir William Heathcote, 3rd Baronet (1746–1819)
- Sir Thomas Freeman-Heathcote, 4th Baronet (1769–1825)
- Sir William Heathcote, 5th Baronet (1801–1881)
- Sir William Perceval Heathcote, 6th Baronet (1826–1903)
- Sir William Arthur Heathcote, 7th Baronet (1853–1924)
- Sir Gilbert Redvers Heathcote, 8th Baronet (1854–1937)
- Sir Francis Cooke Caulfeild Heathcote, 9th Baronet (1868–1961)
- Sir Leonard Vyvyan Heathcote, 10th Baronet (1885–1963)
- Sir Michael Perryman Heathcote, 11th Baronet (1927–2007)
- Sir Timothy Gilbert Heathcote, 12th Baronet (born 1957)

The heir presumptive is the present holder's younger brother, George Benjamin Heathcote (born 1965).

== Extended family ==
- Henry Heathcote, fourth son of the 3rd baronet, received a knighthood and became Admiral of the Blue in the Royal Navy.
- Gilbert Heathcote RN, youngest son of the 3rd Baronet, was also a naval captain.
- The 1st Baronet married Lady Elizabeth Parker, only daughter of Thomas Parker, 1st Earl of Macclesfield. The earldom of Macclesfield and its subsidiary title the viscountcy of Parker had been created with remainder, in default of male issue, to the Earl's daughter Elizabeth and the heirs male of her body. As a result, all male-line descendants of Sir William Heathcote and Lady Elizabeth, including the present Baronet, are in special remainder to these peerages.

== Notes ==
Baronetage of Great Britain
Preceded by Heathcote baronets	Heathcote baronets of Hursley; 16 August 1733	Succeeded by Turner baronets
