= Claud Heathcote-Drummond-Willoughby =

British politician (1872–1950)

Lieutenant-Colonel Claud Heathcote-Drummond-Willoughby

Member of Parliament for Stamford
- In office 1910–1918
- Preceded by: Lord John Joicey-Cecil
- Succeeded by: constituency abolished

Member of Parliament for Rutland and Stamford
- In office 1918–1922
- Preceded by: new constituency
- Succeeded by: Charles Harvey Dixon

Personal details
- Born: 15 October 1872
- Died: 24 February 1950 (aged 77)
- Party: Conservative
- Spouse: Lady Florence Conyngham (m. 1905; died 1946)
- Parents: Gilbert Heathcote (father); Evelyn Elizabeth Gordon (mother)
- Relatives: Charles Gordon (maternal grandfather); Gilbert Heathcote (brother); George Conyngham (father-in-law)
- Military career
- Allegiance: United Kingdom
- Branch: British Army
- Service years: 1891–1902
- Rank: Captain
- Unit: Coldstream Guards
- Conflicts: Second Boer War; Battle of Belmont; Battle of Poplar Grove; Battle of Driefontein; Battle of Diamond Hill; Battle of Bergendal

Lieutenant-Colonel Claud Heathcote-Drummond-Willoughby (15 October 1872 – 24 February 1950) was a British Conservative Party politician.

== Career ==
Heathcote-Drummond-Willoughby was the second son of Gilbert Heathcote-Drummond-Willoughby, 1st Earl of Ancaster, and his wife Lady Evelyn Elizabeth, daughter of Charles Gordon, 10th Marquess of Huntly. Gilbert Heathcote-Drummond-Willoughby, 2nd Earl of Ancaster, was his elder brother.

He was commissioned into the Coldstream Guards as a second lieutenant on 5 December 1891, was promoted to a lieutenant on 27 January 1897, and to captain on 20 March 1900.

He served in South Africa through the Second Boer War 1899–1902; where he was slightly wounded at the Belmont (November 1899). After recovery, he took part in operations in the Orange Free State (February to May 1900), the Transvaal (May to June 1900, July to November 1900) and Cape Colony; and was present at several major battles, including at Poplar Grove and Driefontein (March 1900), Vet River, Zand River, Johannesburg, Pretoria and Diamond Hill (June 1900), Bergendal and Komatipoort (August 1900). Following the end of the war, he returned to the United Kingdom in August 1902.

Heathcote-Drummond-Willoughby entered Parliament for Stamford in the January 1910 general election, a seat he held until 1918 when the constituency was abolished, and then represented Rutland and Stamford from 1918 to 1922.

== Family ==
Heathcote-Drummond-Willoughby married Lady Florence Conyngham, daughter of George Conyngham, 3rd Marquess Conyngham, and widow of Bertram Frankland-Russell-Astley, in 1905. She died in January 1946. Heathcote-Drummond-Willoughby survived her by four years and died in February 1950, aged 77.

Parliament of the United Kingdom
Preceded by Lord John Joicey-Cecil	Member of Parliament for Stamford; Jan. 1910–1918	Constituency abolished
New constituency	Member of Parliament for Rutland and Stamford; 1918–1922	Succeeded by Charles Harvey Dixon
