= Gilbert Heathcote-Drummond-Willoughby, 2nd Earl of Ancaster =

British Conservative politician (1867–1951)

The Right Honourable The Earl of Ancaster GCVO JP DL
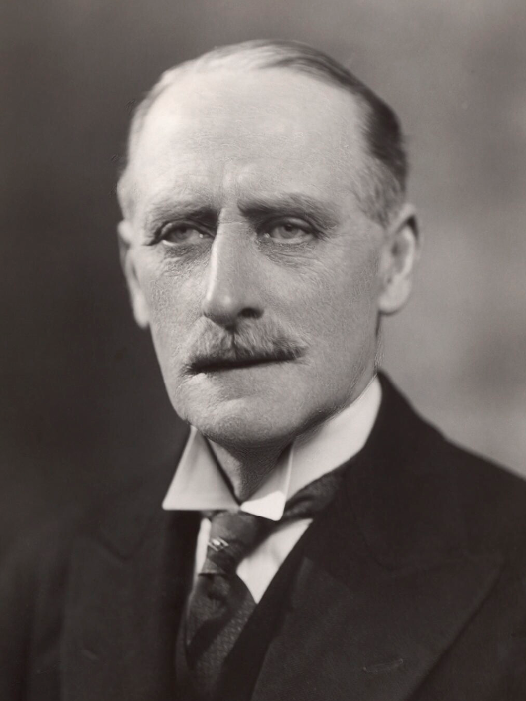
- Ancaster in 1937

Member of Parliament for Horncastle
- In office 1894–1910
- Preceded by: Edward Stanhope
- Succeeded by: William Weigall

Personal details
- Born: 29 July 1867
- Died: 19 September 1951 (aged 84)
- Party: Conservative
- Spouse: Eloise Lawrence Breese (m. 1905)
- Children: Gilbert Heathcote-Drummond-Willoughby
- Parent(s): Gilbert Henry Heathcote-Drummond-Willoughby, 1st Earl of Ancaster; Lady Evelyn Elizabeth Gordon
- Education: Lambrook; Eton College
- Alma mater: Trinity College, Cambridge

Gilbert Heathcote-Drummond-Willoughby, 2nd Earl of Ancaster GCVO JP DL (29 July 1867 – 19 September 1951), known as Lord Willoughby de Eresby from 1892 to 1910, was a British Conservative politician.

== Early life ==
Ancaster was born in London on 29 July 1867. He was the eldest son of Gilbert Henry Heathcote-Drummond-Willoughby, 1st Earl of Ancaster, and Lady Evelyn Elizabeth Gordon, daughter of Charles Gordon, 10th Marquess of Huntly.

He was educated at Lambrook Preparatory School and at Eton, where he was editor of the Eton College Chronicle and president of the Eton Society. He then attended Trinity College, Cambridge.

== Career ==
In 1894, he was elected to Parliament for the Horncastle Division of Lincolnshire, a seat he held until shortly after the December 1910 general election, when he succeeded his father as second Earl of Ancaster and entered the House of Lords. Ancaster later held office as Parliamentary Secretary to the Ministry of Agriculture and Fisheries under David Lloyd George from 1921 to 1922 and under Bonar Law and Stanley Baldwin from 1922 to 1924.

Apart from his parliamentary political career he was also Lord Lieutenant of Rutland from 1921 to 1951, Chairman of Rutland County Council from 1922 to 1937, DL for the county of Perthshire and JP for Lincolnshire, where he was Chairman of the Kesteven Quarter Sessions from 1911 to 1937.

He was Joint Lord Great Chamberlain between 1910 and 1951. He was appointed GCVO in 1937.

During the Second Boer War he was appointed an honorary Major of the Leicestershire Imperial Yeomanry, but was in June 1901 transferred to become Captain of the Lincolnshire Imperial Yeomanry, rising to Lieutenant-Colonel.

On 12 December 1902 he was one of the founding directors of Ivel Agricultural Motors Limited of Biggleswade, founded by Dan Albone who had invented the Ivel Agricultural Motor (the word 'tractor' did not come into common use until later).

== Personal life ==
In 1905, Lord Aveland married American heiress Eloise Lawrence Breese (1882–1953), daughter of William Lawrence Breese of New York, at St Margaret's, Westminster. Her sister Anne married Lord Alastair Robert Innes-Ker, the second son of James Innes-Ker, 7th Duke of Roxburghe. Lord Alastair's brother, Henry Innes-Ker, 8th Duke of Roxburghe, also married an American, Mary Goelet. Eloise and Anne's brother, William L. Breese Jr., was married to Julia Kean Fish, daughter of U.S. Representative Hamilton Fish II. Together, Eloise and Gilbert were the parents of two sons and two daughters:

- Lady Catherine Mary Heathcote-Drumond-Willoughby (1906–1996), who married Charles Wedderburn Hume and John St Maur Ramsden (1902–1948), son of Sir John Ramsden, 6th Baronet.
- Gilbert James Heathcote-Drumond-Willoughby (1907–1983), who married the Hon. Nancy Phyllis Louise Astor, daughter of Waldorf Astor, 2nd Viscount Astor.
- Lady Priscilla Heathcote-Drumond-Willoughby (1909–2002), who married Col. Sir John Aird, 3rd Baronet (parents of Sir John Aird, 4th Baronet).
- John Heathcote-Drumond-Willoughby (1914–1970), who died unmarried.

He died on 19 September 1951, aged 84, and was succeeded in his titles by his only surviving son, Gilbert James Heathcote-Drummond-Willoughby. His widow died in 1953.

Parliament of the United Kingdom
Preceded by Edward Stanhope	Member of Parliament for Horncastle; 1894–1910	Succeeded by William Weigall
Political offices
Preceded by The Earl of Onslow	Parliamentary Secretary to the Ministry of Agriculture and Fisheries; 1921–1924	Succeeded by Walter Robert Smith
Court offices
Preceded by The Marquess of Cholmondeley	Lord Great Chamberlain; 1936–1951	Succeeded by The 3rd Earl of Ancaster
Honorary titles
Preceded by The Lord Ranksborough	Lord Lieutenant of Rutland; 1921–1951	Succeeded by William Melville Codrington
Peerage of the United Kingdom
Preceded by Gilbert Heathcote-Drummond-Willoughby	Earl of Ancaster; 1910–1951	Succeeded by Gilbert Heathcote-Drummond-Willoughby
Peerage of England
Preceded by Gilbert Heathcote-Drummond-Willoughby	Baron Willoughby de Eresby (descended by acceleration); 1910–1951	Succeeded by Gilbert Heathcote-Drummond-Willoughby
