= Rutland and Stamford =

UK Parliament constituency (1918–1983, 2024 onwards)

- County constituency for the House of Commons
- Interactive map of boundaries since 2024
- Location within the East Midlands
- County: Lincolnshire, Leicestershire, and Rutland
- Electorate: 70,864 (March 2020)
- Major settlements: Oakham, Stamford and Uppingham

Current constituency
- Created: 2024
- Member of Parliament: Alicia Kearns (Conservative)
- Seats: One
- Created from: Rutland & Melton; Grantham & Stamford

1918–1983
- Created from: Rutland and Stamford
- Replaced by: Rutland & Melton; Stamford & Spalding

Rutland and Stamford is a county constituency comprising the area of Lincolnshire centred on the town of Stamford; the entire county of Rutland; and also parts of rural Leicestershire, making it a very unusual parliamentary constituency in that it spans three counties. It returns one Member of Parliament (MP) to the House of Commons of the Parliament of the United Kingdom, using the first-past-the-post voting system. It was recreated for the 2024 general election, since when it has been represented by Alicia Kearns of the Conservative Party. Kearns was previously the MP for the predecessor seat of Rutland and Melton.

== Constituency profile ==
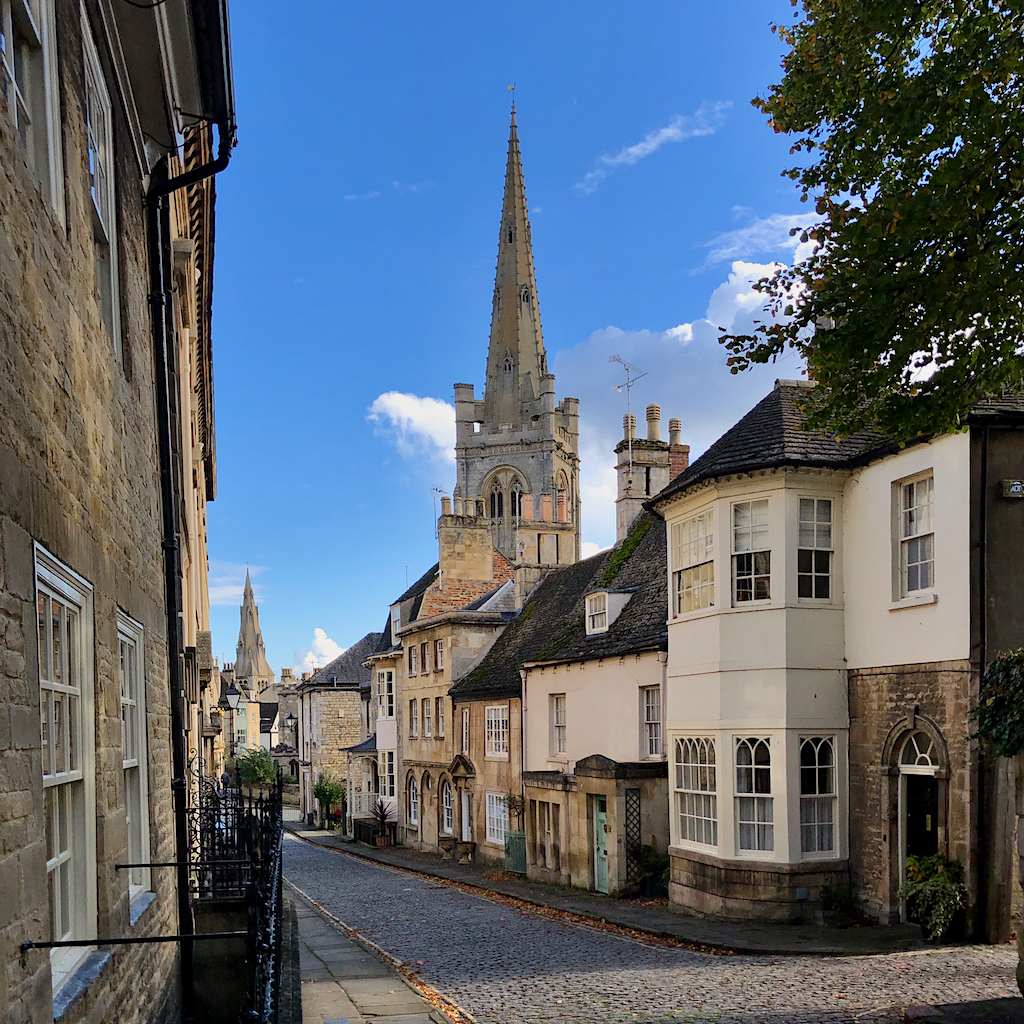
Barn Hill, Stamford

Rutland and Stamford is a constituency in the East Midlands of England, covering the small county of Rutland and parts of Leicestershire and Lincolnshire. Its largest town is Stamford, which has a population of around 21,000. Other settlements include the towns of Oakham and Uppingham and the villages of Thurlby, Thurnby and Bushby.

This is a large, rural, sparsely-populated constituency characterised by low, rolling hills and many small villages and hamlets. Stamford is a historic market town known for its well-preserved Jacobean and Georgian-era town centre. Oakham and Uppingham are also historic rural towns and, like Stamford, are popular with tourists. The constituency is generally affluent with low levels of deprivation; Stamford and Uppingham have both been described as some of the best places to live in the country. House prices across the constituency are generally higher than the UK average and considerably higher than the rest of the East Midlands.

Rutland and Stamford has a high proportion of retirees and a low young adult population. Residents have high levels of income and homeownership and the child poverty rate is low. They are generally well-educated and a high proportion work in the agriculture and tourism sectors. The percentage of residents claiming unemployment benefits is around half the UK-wide rate. White people made up 93% of the population at the 2021 census. Asians, mostly of Indian origin, were 4% of the population, but they made up around a quarter of residents in Thurnby, Bushby and Scraptoft which lie on the edge of Leicester.

At the local council level, the constituency is represented by a mixture of Liberal Democrats and Conservatives; Liberal Democrats were mostly elected in the towns and large villages whilst Conservatives were elected in the rural areas. An estimated 53% of voters in Rutland and Stamford supported leaving the European Union in the 2016 referendum, similar to the UK-wide figure of 52%.

== History ==
The constituency was originally created for the 1918 general election, and abolished for the 1983 general election. It was succeeded by the Rutland & Melton and Stamford & Spalding constituencies.

Further to the completion of the 2023 review of Westminster constituencies, the seat was re-established for the 2024 general election.

== Boundaries ==
=== Historic ===
1918–1950: The administrative county of Rutland, the Municipal Borough of Stamford, the Urban District of Bourne, the Rural Districts of Bourne and Uffington, and part of the Rural District of Grantham.

1950–1983: The administrative county of Rutland, the Municipal Borough of Stamford, the Urban District of Bourne, the Rural District of South Kesteven, and parts of the Rural Districts of East Kesteven and West Kesteven.

=== Current ===
The re-established constituency is composed of the following (as they existed on 1 December 2020):

- The District of Harborough wards of: Billesdon & Tilton; Nevill; Thurnby & Houghton.
- The County of Rutland.
- The District of South Kesteven wards of: Casewick; Castle; Dole Wood; Glen; Isaac Newton; Stamford All Saints; Stamford St. George's; Stamford St. John's; Stamford St. Mary's.

It includes the following areas:

- The County of Rutland and the parts of Harborough District, including Thurnby, from the abolished constituency of Rutland and Melton;
- The town of Stamford and surrounding areas from the abolished constituency of Grantham and Stamford.

== Members of Parliament ==
=== MPs 1918–1983 ===
Rutland and Stamford prior to 1918

Election	Member	Party
1918	Claud Heathcote-Drummond-Willoughby	Conservative
1922	Charles Harvey Dixon	Conservative
1923 by-election	Neville Smith-Carington	Conservative
1933 by-election	Lord Willoughby de Eresby	Conservative
1950	Sir Roger Conant	Conservative
1959	Kenneth Lewis	Conservative
1983	Constituency abolished. See Rutland & Melton and Stamford & Spalding	

In 1983 Rutland became part of the Rutland and Melton constituency, as did Melton borough and part of Harborough District in Leicestershire.

=== MPs since 2024 ===
Rutland & Melton and Grantham & Stamford prior to 2024

Election	Member	Party
2024	Alicia Kearns	Conservative

== Elections ==
=== Elections in the 2020s ===
General election 2024: Rutland and Stamford
Party	Candidate	Votes	%	±%
Conservative	Alicia Kearns	21,248	43.7	−19.6
Labour	Joe Wood	10,854	22.3	+7.6
Reform	Chris Clowes	7,008	14.4	New
Liberal Democrats	James Moore	6,252	12.9	−2.9
Green	Emma Baker	2,806	5.8	+2.2
Rejoin EU	Joanna Burrows	409	0.8	New
Majority		10,394	21.4	−27.2
Turnout		48,577	67.7	−8.2
Registered electors		71,711		
Conservative win (new seat)				

Reform UK removed Ginny Ball as its candidate in March 2024 after "exposure of a range of racist comments on her social media feed".

== Elections 1918–1983 ==
=== Elections in the 1910s ===
General election 1918: Rutland and Stamford
Party		Candidate	Votes	%	±%
C	Unionist	Claud Heathcote-Drummond-Willoughby	8,838	53.6	
	Labour	Fleming Eccles	7,639	46.4	
Majority			1,199	7.2	
Turnout			16,477	61.8	
Registered electors			26,647		
	Unionist win (new seat)				
C indicates candidate endorsed by the coalition government.

=== Elections in the 1920s ===
General election 1922: Rutland and Stamford
Party	Candidate	Votes	%	±%
Unionist	Charles Harvey Dixon	10,278	46.8	−6.8
Labour	Fleming Eccles	7,236	32.9	−13.5
National Farmers' Union	Edward Clark	4,471	20.3	New
Majority		3,042	13.9	+6.7
Turnout		21,985	81.2	+19.4
Registered electors		27,074		
Unionist hold		Swing	+3.4	

1923 Rutland and Stamford by-election
Party	Candidate	Votes	%	±%
Unionist	Neville Smith-Carington	11,196	57.1	+10.3
Labour	Arthur Sells	8,406	42.9	+10.0
Majority		2,790	14.2	+0.3
Turnout		19,602	71.5	−9.7
Registered electors		27,409		
Unionist hold		Swing	+0.2	

General election 1923: Rutland and Stamford
Party	Candidate	Votes	%	±%
Unionist	Neville Smith-Carington	10,803	51.4	+4.6
Liberal	Frank Stapledon Hiley	5,203	24.8	New
Labour	Arthur Sells	5,005	23.8	−9.1
Majority		5,600	26.6	+12.7
Turnout		21,011	76.7	−4.5
Registered electors		27,409		
Unionist hold		Swing	+6.9	

General election 1924: Rutland and Stamford
Party	Candidate	Votes	%	±%
Unionist	Neville Smith-Carington	13,286	66.7	+15.3
Labour	H F Wheeler	6,633	33.3	+9.5
Majority		6,653	33.4	+6.8
Turnout		19,919	71.5	−5.2
Registered electors		27,869		
Unionist hold		Swing	+2.9	

General election 1929: Rutland and Stamford
Party	Candidate	Votes	%	±%
Unionist	Neville Smith-Carington	12,607	47.4	−19.3
Labour	Henry James Jones	7,403	27.9	−5.4
Liberal	Harry Payne	6,561	24.7	New
Majority		5,204	19.5	−13.9
Turnout		26,571	76.7	+5.2
Registered electors		34,647		
Unionist hold		Swing	−7.0	

=== Elections in the 1930s ===
General election 1931: Rutland and Stamford
Party	Candidate	Votes	%	±%
Conservative	Neville Smith-Carington	19,086	71.9	+24.5
Labour	F E Church	7,446	28.1	+0.2
Majority		11,640	43.8	+24.3
Turnout		26,532	75.3	−1.4
Conservative hold		Swing		

1933 Rutland and Stamford by-election
Party	Candidate	Votes	%	±%
Conservative	James Heathcote-Drummond-Willoughby	14,605	53.3	−18.6
Labour	Arnold William Gray	12,818	46.7	+18.6
Majority		1,787	6.6	−37.2
Turnout		27,423	77.2	+1.9
Conservative hold		Swing		

General election 1935: Rutland and Stamford
Party	Candidate	Votes	%	±%
Conservative	James Heathcote-Drummond-Willoughby	16,799	59.9	−12.0
Labour	Arnold William Gray	11,238	40.1	+12.0
Majority		5,561	19.8	−24.0
Turnout		28,037	78.4	+3.1
Conservative hold		Swing		

General Election 1939–40 Another General Election was required to take place before the end of 1940. The political parties had been making preparations for an election to take place and by the Autumn of 1939, the following candidates had been selected;

- Conservative: James Heathcote-Drummond-Willoughby
- Labour: Arnold William Gray

=== Elections in the 1940s ===
General election 1945: Rutland and Stamford
Party	Candidate	Votes	%	±%
Conservative	James Heathcote-Drummond-Willoughby	15,359	53.7	−6.2
Labour	Arnold William Gray	13,223	46.3	+6.2
Majority		2,136	7.4	−12.4
Turnout		28,582	72.9	−5.5
Conservative hold		Swing		

=== Elections in the 1950s ===
General election 1950: Rutland and Stamford
Party	Candidate	Votes	%	±%
Conservative	Roger Conant	16,498	49.6	−4.1
Labour	Tom Bradley	13,712	41.3	−5.0
Liberal	Cyril Valentine	3,024	9.1	New
Majority		2,786	8.3	+0.9
Turnout		33,234	83.8	+10.9
Conservative hold		Swing		

General election 1951: Rutland and Stamford
Party	Candidate	Votes	%	±%
Conservative	Roger Conant	17,850	54.1	+4.5
Labour	Tom Bradley	15,127	45.9	+4.6
Majority		2,723	8.2	−0.1
Turnout		32,977		
Conservative hold		Swing		

General election 1955: Rutland and Stamford
Party	Candidate	Votes	%	±%
Conservative	Roger Conant	17,675	54.3	+0.2
Labour	Tom Bradley	14,856	45.7	−0.2
Majority		2,819	3.6	−4.6
Turnout		32,531	79.7	
Conservative hold		Swing		

General election 1959: Rutland and Stamford
Party	Candidate	Votes	%	±%
Conservative	Kenneth Lewis	19,078	57.4	+3.1
Labour	Christopher S B Attlee	14,137	42.6	−3.1
Majority		4,941	14.8	+11.2
Turnout		33,215		
Conservative hold		Swing		

=== Elections in the 1960s ===
General election 1964: Rutland and Stamford
Party	Candidate	Votes	%	±%
Conservative	Kenneth Lewis	18,720	55.5	−1.9
Labour Co-op	A Victor Butler	14,990	44.5	+1.9
Majority		3,730	11.0	−3.8
Turnout		33,710	79.3	
Conservative hold		Swing		

General election 1966: Rutland and Stamford
Party	Candidate	Votes	%	±%
Conservative	Kenneth Lewis	17,991	53.4	−2.1
Labour Co-op	A Victor Butler	15,704	46.6	+2.1
Majority		2,287	6.8	−4.2
Turnout		33,695		
Conservative hold		Swing		

=== Elections in the 1970s ===
General election 1970: Rutland and Stamford
Party	Candidate	Votes	%	±%
Conservative	Kenneth Lewis	22,803	60.1	+6.7
Labour	Henry Toch	15,136	39.9	−6.7
Majority		7,667	20.2	+13.4
Turnout		37,939	75.0	
Conservative hold		Swing		

General election February 1974: Rutland and Stamford
Party	Candidate	Votes	%	±%
Conservative	Kenneth Lewis	21,088	47.25	
Labour	Anthony Byrne	12,203	27.34	
Liberal	David Howie	11,336	25.40	New
Majority		8,885	19.91	
Turnout		44,627	82.40	
Conservative hold		Swing		

General election October 1974: Rutland and Stamford
Party	Candidate	Votes	%	±%
Conservative	Kenneth Lewis	19,101	46.2	−1.0
Labour	Malcolm R.C. Withers	12,111	29.3	+2.0
Liberal	David Howie	10,113	24.5	−0.9
Majority		6,990	16.9	−3.0
Turnout		41,325	72.0	−10.4
Conservative hold		Swing		

General election 1979: Rutland and Stamford
Party	Candidate	Votes	%	±%
Conservative	Kenneth Lewis	26,198	56.48	+10.28
Labour	Malcolm R.C. Withers	11,383	24.54	−4.76
Liberal	Peter Blaine	8,801	18.98	−5.52
Majority		14,815	31.94	
Turnout		46,382	78.08	
Conservative hold		Swing		

== See also ==
- Parliamentary constituencies in the East Midlands
- Parliamentary constituencies in Leicestershire and Rutland
- Parliamentary constituencies in Lincolnshire
- Stamford (UK Parliament constituency)
