= Heathcote baronets =

Set index for Heathcote baronets

There have been two baronetcies created for people with the surname Heathcote, both in the Baronetage of Great Britain and both created in 1733. As of 2026 both baronetcies are extant.

- Heathcote baronets of London (1733)
- Heathcote baronets of Hursley (1733)

== See also ==
- Heathcoat-Amory baronets
- Baron Willoughby de Eresby
- Duke of Ancaster and Kesteven
- Earl of Lindsey
- Earl of Macclesfield (1721 creation)
