= Gilbert Heathcote-Drummond-Willoughby, 1st Earl of Ancaster =

British politician

The Right Honourable The Earl of Ancaster PC
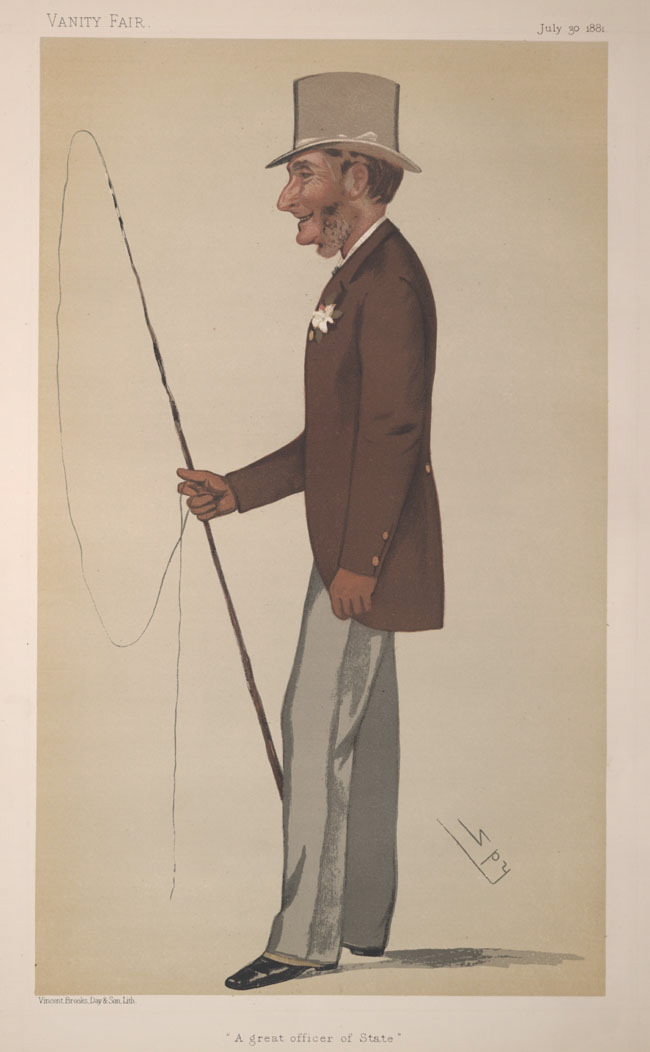
- "A Great Officer of State" as caricatured by Spy, Vanity Fair, 1881.

Member of Parliament for Boston
- In office 1852–1856 Serving with Benjamin Cabbell
- Preceded by: James William Freshfield; Benjamin Cabbell
- Succeeded by: Herbert Ingram; Benjamin Cabbell

Member of Parliament for Rutland
- In office 1856–1867 Serving with the Hon. Gerard Noel
- Preceded by: Sir Gilbert Heathcote; Hon. Gerard Noel
- Succeeded by: Hon. Gerard Noel; George Finch

Personal details
- Born: 1 October 1830 Portman Square, London W1
- Died: 24 December 1910 (aged 80) Lincolnshire, England
- Resting place: St Michael & All Angels' Church, Edenham, Lincolnshire, England
- Political party: Liberal
- Children: 10, including: Gilbert, 2nd Earl of Ancaster; Brigadier Charles Heathcote-Drummond-Willoughby; Colonel Claud Heathcote-Drummond-Willoughby
- Parents: Gilbert Heathcote, 1st Baron Aveland (father); Clementina, 24th Baroness Willoughby de Eresby (mother)

Arms of Willoughby-Drummond-Heathcote

Gilbert Henry Heathcote-Drummond-Willoughby, 1st Earl of Ancaster PC (born Heathcote 1 October 1830 – 24 December 1910), known as Lord Aveland from 1867 to 1888 then Lord Willoughby de Eresby from 1888 to 1892, was a British Liberal politician and courtier.

== Early life ==
Born at Portman Square in Marylebone, London, the eldest son of Sir Gilbert Heathcote and the Hon. Clementina Heathcote (née Drummond-Burrell), he was educated at Harrow and Trinity College, Cambridge.

In 1856, his father was created Baron Aveland, of Aveland in the County of Lincoln, in the peerage of the United Kingdom; his mother succeeded her brother as 24th Baroness Willoughby de Eresby in 1871, when her family's ancient English peerage title was called out of abeyance.

A keen cricketer, as was his great-grandfather Peter Burrell, 1st Baron Gwydyr, he served as President of Marylebone Cricket Club in 1890.

== Career ==
Elected to the House of Commons for Boston, a seat he held until 1856, as the Hon. Gilbert Heathcote MP he then represented Rutland until entering the House of Lords in 1867 upon succeeding his father as 2nd Baron Aveland.

When Lord Aveland, he assumed by Royal Licence in 1872 the additional surnames of Willoughby and Drummond, serving as Deputy Lord Great Chamberlain (on behalf of his mother and aunt, Lady Carrington) from 1871 to 1901 and was sworn of the Privy Council in 1880.

From 1888, he sat in the House of Lords as 25th Baron Willoughby de Eresby, after succeeding to his mother's senior peerage title, until advancement four years later as Earl of Ancaster, in the County of Lincoln, in the peerage of the United Kingdom. This new creation was a revival of the title held by his maternal ancestors the Dukes of Ancaster and Kesteven.

Among other appointments, the Earl of Ancaster served as a County Alderman for Rutland and Chairman of Quarter Sessions for Parts of Kesteven, Lincolnshire. He was a major landowner of 31,000 acres, seated at Grimsthorpe Castle in Lincolnshire.

== Personal life ==
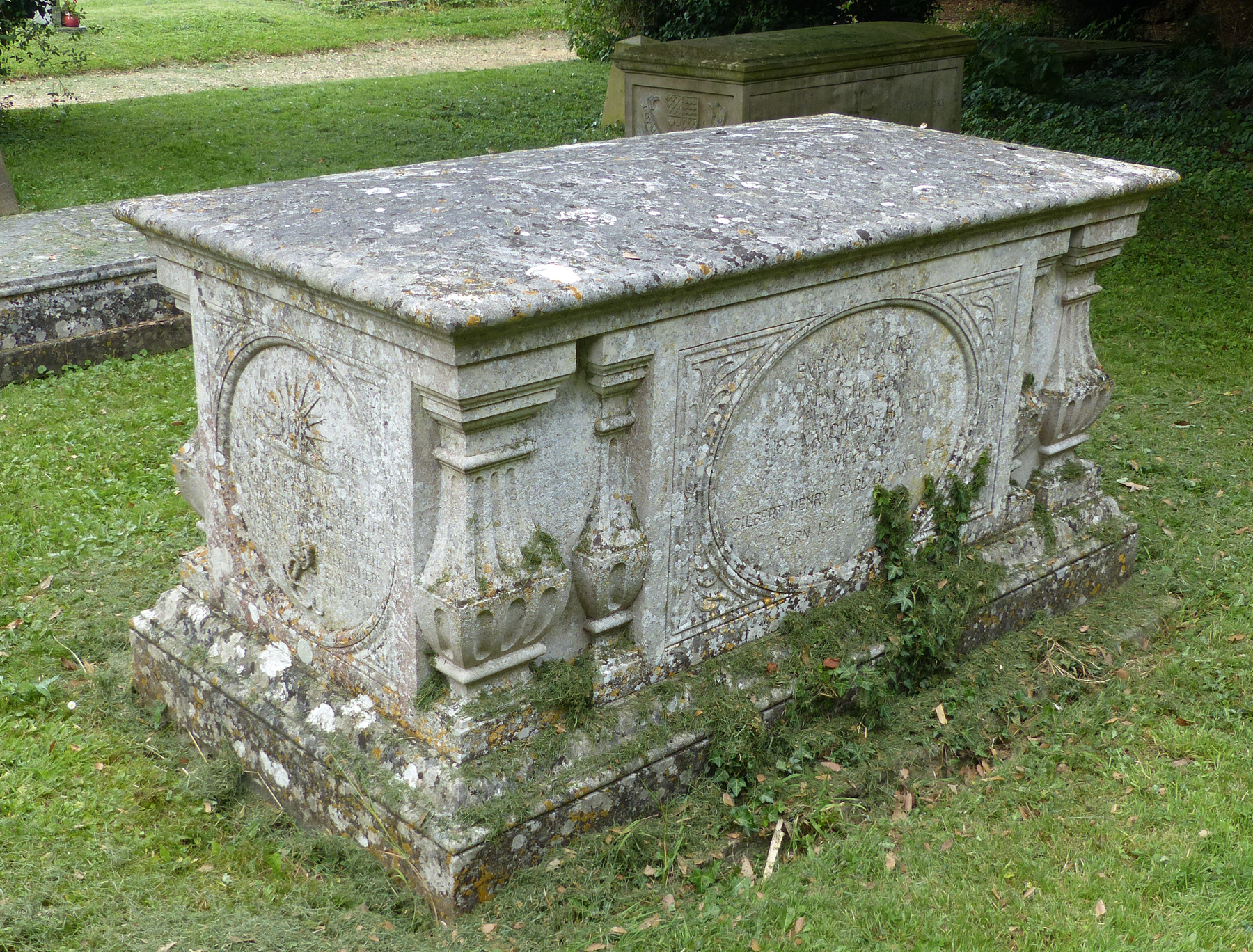
Lord Ancaster's tomb at St Michael and All Angels' Church, Edenham, Lincolnshire

In 1863, he married Lady Evelyn Elizabeth Gordon, daughter of Charles Gordon, 10th Marquess of Huntly; together, the Earl and Countess of Ancaster had ten children:

- Lady Evelyn Clementina Heathcote-Drummond-Willoughby (1864–1924), married Major-General Sir Henry Ewart, 1st Baronet, of White House;
- Lady Margaret Mary Heathcote-Drummond-Willoughby (1866–1956), married in 1902 Gideon Macpherson Rutherford, barrister-at-law;
- Gilbert Heathcote-Drummond-Willoughby (1867–1951), succeeded as 2nd Earl of Ancaster;
- Lady Nina Heathcote-Drummond-Willoughby (1869–1940);
- Brigadier-General the Hon. Charles Heathcote-Drummond-Willoughby (1870–1949), fought in the Second Boer War and World War I;
- Lieutenant-Colonel the Hon. Claud Heathcote-Drummond-Willoughby (1872–1950), fought in the Second Boer War and World War I, later serving as a Conservative MP;
- Lady Cecilie Heathcote-Drummond-Willoughby (1874–1960) married Thomas Clarence Edward Goff;
- Lady Alice Heathcote-Drummond-Willoughby (1876–1951);
- Lady Mary Adelaide Heathcote-Drummond-Willoughby (1878–1960), married the 14th Earl of Dalhousie and was mother of both the 15th and the 16th Earl;
- Lieutenant-Commander the Hon. Peter Robert Heathcote-Drummond-Willoughby (1885–1914), Royal Navy officer killed in action by the sinking of HMS Monmouth at the Battle of Coronel.

Lord Ancaster died on 24 December 1910, aged 80, being buried alongside his uncle at Edenham Church in Lincolnshire, whose tombs are now classified with Grade II-listed status.

He was succeeded in the family titles by his eldest son, Gilbert Heathcote-Drummond-Willoughby, 2nd Earl of Ancaster.

== See also ==
- Ancaster, Lincolnshire
- Baron Aveland
- Baron Willoughby de Eresby
- Heathcote baronets

== Notes ==
Parliament of the United Kingdom
Preceded by James William Freshfield; Benjamin Cabbell	Member of Parliament for Boston; 1852–1856; With: Benjamin Cabbell	Succeeded by Herbert Ingram; Benjamin Cabbell
Preceded by Sir Gilbert Heathcote; Hon. Gerard Noel	Member of Parliament for Rutland; 1856–1867; With: Hon. Gerard Noel	Succeeded by Hon. Gerard Noel; George Finch
Court offices
Preceded by The Lord Willoughby de Eresby	Lord Great Chamberlain; Acting; 1871–1888	Succeeded by Himself
Preceded by Himself as Deputy	Lord Great Chamberlain; 1888–1901	Succeeded by The Marquess of Cholmondeley
Peerage of the United Kingdom
New creation	Earl of Ancaster; 1892–1910	Succeeded by Gilbert Heathcote-Drummond-Willoughby
Preceded by Gilbert John Heathcote	Baron Aveland; 1867–1910	Succeeded by Gilbert Heathcote-Drummond-Willoughby
Peerage of England
Preceded by Clementina Drummond-Willoughby	Baron Willoughby de Eresby; 1888–1910	Succeeded by Gilbert Heathcote-Drummond-Willoughby
