= Louth by-election =

Louth by-election may refer to one of three parliamentary by-elections held in the British House of Commons constituency of Louth in Lincolnshire:

- 1920 Louth by-election
- 1921 Louth by-election
- 1969 Louth by-election

== See also ==
- Louth, Lincolnshire (UK Parliament constituency)
