= Geoffrey Rhoades =

British painter

Geoffrey Rhoades (1898–1980) was a British painter and art teacher.

== Life ==
Rhoades was born in London, and was a student at Clapham Art School from 1915 to 1917. After a period in the merchant navy he attended the Slade School from 1919 to 1923 where he was taught by Henry Tonks. He worked on decorative painting for Christopher Hatton Turnor at Stoke Rochford Hall who was opening up the family home to summer schools, in particular for the Workers' Educational Association.

Rhoades then went into teaching, at the Working Men's College in Camden Town, at the request of Percy Horton. From 1953 he taught at the Ruskin School of Art in Oxford, until 1972.

== Awards ==
- Giles Bequest Prize 1950 for his linocut "Anacreon's Tomb"

== Art ==
- Winter Afternoon, Chalk Farm (1935)
- Anacreon's Tomb (Lino cut) (1950)
