= Thomas Wintringham =

Thomas Wintringham may refer to:

- Thomas Wintringham (15th-century MP), in 1406 MP for Northampton (UK Parliament constituency)
- Thomas Wintringham (Liberal politician) (1867–1921), British Liberal Member of Parliament 1920–1921
- Tom Wintringham (1898–1949), British soldier, military historian, journalist, poet, Marxist, politician, author and founder of the Common Wealth Party
