= Liberal League =

Liberal League may refer to:

- National Liberal League (United States), an American organization 1876-1885
- Liberal League (Finland), a political party in Finland
- Liberal League (Japan), a political party in Japan
- Liberal League (Luxembourg), a political party in Luxembourg
- Liberal League (United Kingdom), a grouping within the British Liberal Party
- Liberal Alliance of Montenegro, also referred to as the Liberal League of Montenegro
- Tasmanian Liberal League
