= 1920 Louth by-election =

UK parliamentary by-election

- 3 June 1920 (Polling); 16 June 1920 (Declaration)
- Registered: 27,279
- Turnout: 63.1%
		Uni
Candidate	Thomas Wintringham	Christopher Hatton Turnor
Party	Liberal	Unionist
Alliance		Coalition
Popular vote	9,859	7,354
Percentage	57.3%	42.7%
Swing	▲11.8%	▼11.8%
MP before election
Langton Brackenbury
Unionist
Subsequent MP
Thomas Wintringham
Liberal

The 1920 Louth by-election was a parliamentary by-election for the British House of Commons constituency of Louth in Lincolnshire. Voting was held on 3 June 1920. The by-election took place five days after the Louth Flood of 29 May 1920 had claimed 23 lives.

== Background ==
The seat had become vacant on the death on 28 April of the Conservative Member of Parliament (MP) Langton Brackenbury. He had represented the constituency since the 1918 general election, and previously been Louth's MP from January 1910 to December 1910.

=== Electoral history ===
The constituency was created in 1885. The Liberals had won the seat six times and the Unionists three times. It was a marginal seat in 1910 but in 1918 the Liberal MP, Timothy Davies surprisingly did not receive endorsement from the Coalition Government, which instead was given to his Unionist opponent. The result at that General Election was:

1918 general election: Louth
Party		Candidate	Votes	%
C	Unionist	Langton Brackenbury	9,055	54.5
	Liberal	Timothy Davies	7,559	45.5
Majority			1,496	9.0
Turnout			16,614	60.3
Registered electors			27,572	
	Unionist win (new boundaries)			
C indicates candidate endorsed by the coalition government.

== Candidates ==
=== Unionist ===
On 5 May, the Unionists selected 47-year-old Christopher Hatton Turnor as their candidate to defend the seat. He was an author, architect, and social reformer. He was known for having designed the Watts Gallery, Surrey and the Stoneham War Shrine, Hampshire. Turnor was also a member of the National Democratic and Labour Party, who endorsed his candidacy. Turnor was educated at the Royal Agricultural College, Cirencester and at Christ Church, Oxford. He initially trained as an architect under Edwin Lutyens and Robert Weir Schultz. In addition to his architectural work, Turnor became a campaigner for agricultural reform. He co-founded the Central Landowners' Association.

=== Liberal ===
On 4 May, the Liberals selected 52-year-old nonconformist Thomas Wintringham as their candidate to regain the seat. He was a local man from Little Grimsby and was standing for parliament for the first time.

=== Labour ===
The Labour Party had not contested the seat before and again did not put forward a candidate.

== Campaign ==
The writ for the by-election was moved on 13 May 1920. Polling day was set for 3 June 1920, 36 days after the death of the former MP. On 25 May 1920 nominations closed to confirm that the election would be a two-way contest. Turnor immediately received the official endorsement of the coalition government and a letter of support from Prime Minister David Lloyd George and the Unionist Leader Bonar Law.

Given the nature of the constituency, agricultural issues played a prominent part in the campaign and were a subject on which Turnor, the Unionist candidate, felt comfortable given his background. Wintringham, the Liberal candidate, was known to be a strong supporter of the temperance movement. The issue of how to resolve problems in Ireland was high on the agenda of the politicians in London. The Liberals argued for the implementation of the Irish Home Rule Bill that had been passed in 1914.

On 29 May, five days before polling day, flooding caused much damage and claimed 23 lives. This event substantially restricted campaigning in the final week. Both campaigns agreed to cancel all planned meetings. Many photographs were taken of the flood aftermath, largely because the press were already in the town for the by-election.

The Liberal campaign seemed to have gone down particularly well in the more rural areas and among women voters.

== Result ==
The Unionist press were confidently predicting a Unionist victory. There was also talk of a very low turnout due to the recent flooding making it difficult for voters to get to the polls. Despite this difficulty, the turnout was actually higher than it had been at the previous general election. The Liberal candidate Thomas Wintringham, won the by-election, gaining the seat from the Unionists on a large 11.8% swing;

Tom Wintringham

Louth by-election, 1920
Party		Candidate	Votes	%	±%
	Liberal	Thomas Wintringham	9,859	57.3	+11.8
C	Unionist	Christopher Hatton Turnor	7,354	42.7	−11.8
Majority			2,505	14.6	N/A
Turnout			17,213	63.1	+2.8
Registered electors			27,279		–293
	Liberal gain from Unionist		Swing	+11.8	
C indicates candidate endorsed by the coalition government.

This was the Liberal Party's fourth gain of the parliament in just 18 months, equaling the number of gains made by the Labour Party. The by-election was clear evidence that the Liberals could be restored to their pre-1918 position in agricultural constituencies where Labour candidates were unlikely to feature.

== Aftermath ==
Thomas Wintringham died in office the following year, triggering another by-election which was won by his wife Margaret.

== See also ==
- United Kingdom by-election records
- Louth constituency
- 1921 Louth by-election
- 1969 Louth by-election
- List of United Kingdom by-elections (1918–1931)
