= Arthur Heneage =

British politician (1881–1971)

Lieutenant-Colonel Sir Arthur Pelham Heneage DSO (11 July 1881 – 22 November 1971) was a British Conservative Party politician. During the First World War, he served with the Royal Field Artillery and was awarded the Distinguished Service Order in the 1917 Birthday Honours.

Heneage was elected as the Member of Parliament (MP) for the Louth constituency in Lincolnshire at the 1924 general election. He defeated the incumbent Liberal MP Margaret Wintringham, who had been the second woman to take a seat in the House of Commons. Heneage held the seat for over two decades until his retirement from Parliament at the 1945 general election.

In 1912, Heneage married Anne Findlay, daughter of Brigadier-General Neil Douglas Findlay; the couple had five children. He was knighted in the 1945 New Year Honours and died at his home at Walesby Hall, in Market Rasen, Lincolnshire, at the age of 90. The Labour politician Giles Radice was his grandson.

Parliament of the United Kingdom
Preceded by Margaret Wintringham	Member of Parliament for Louth; 1924–1945	Succeeded by Cyril Osborne
