= David Robinson (journalist) =

- Born: 29 August 1927; Horncastle, Lincolnshire, UK
- Died: 25 July 2017 (aged 89); Grimsby, North Lincolnshire, UK
- Occupation(s): Journalist; Author

David Norman Robinson OBE (29 August 1927–25 July 2017) was a British journalist, author, and teacher.

== Early life ==
Robinson was born in Croft Street, Horncastle, and attended Queen Elizabeth's Grammar School. He graduated from the University of Nottingham with a degree in Geography and, subsequently, a MSc in which he wrote a thesis on the coastal evolution of north-east Lincolnshire.

== Career ==
He taught in schools in Immingham and Grimsby before becoming resident tutor of the University of Nottingham for North Lincolnshire. He edited the 'Lincolnshire Poacher' magazine in the 1950s, 'Lincolnshire Life' until 1989, and served on the editorial team for the 'Natural World' magazine.

Robinson had variously served on the committees of many learned or charitable societies, including as: Honorary secretary of the Lincolnshire Wildlife Trust, the President of Lincolnshire Naturalists' Union, President of the Society for Lincolnshire History and Archaeology, President of the Louth Naturalists', Antiquarian, and Literary Society, President of Louth Civic Trust (of which he was a founder in 1967), Life President of the Sir Joseph Banks Society, and Chairman of the Governors of Horncastle College. He was awarded an OBE in the 1997 Birthday Honours for services to journalism and the community of Lincolnshire.

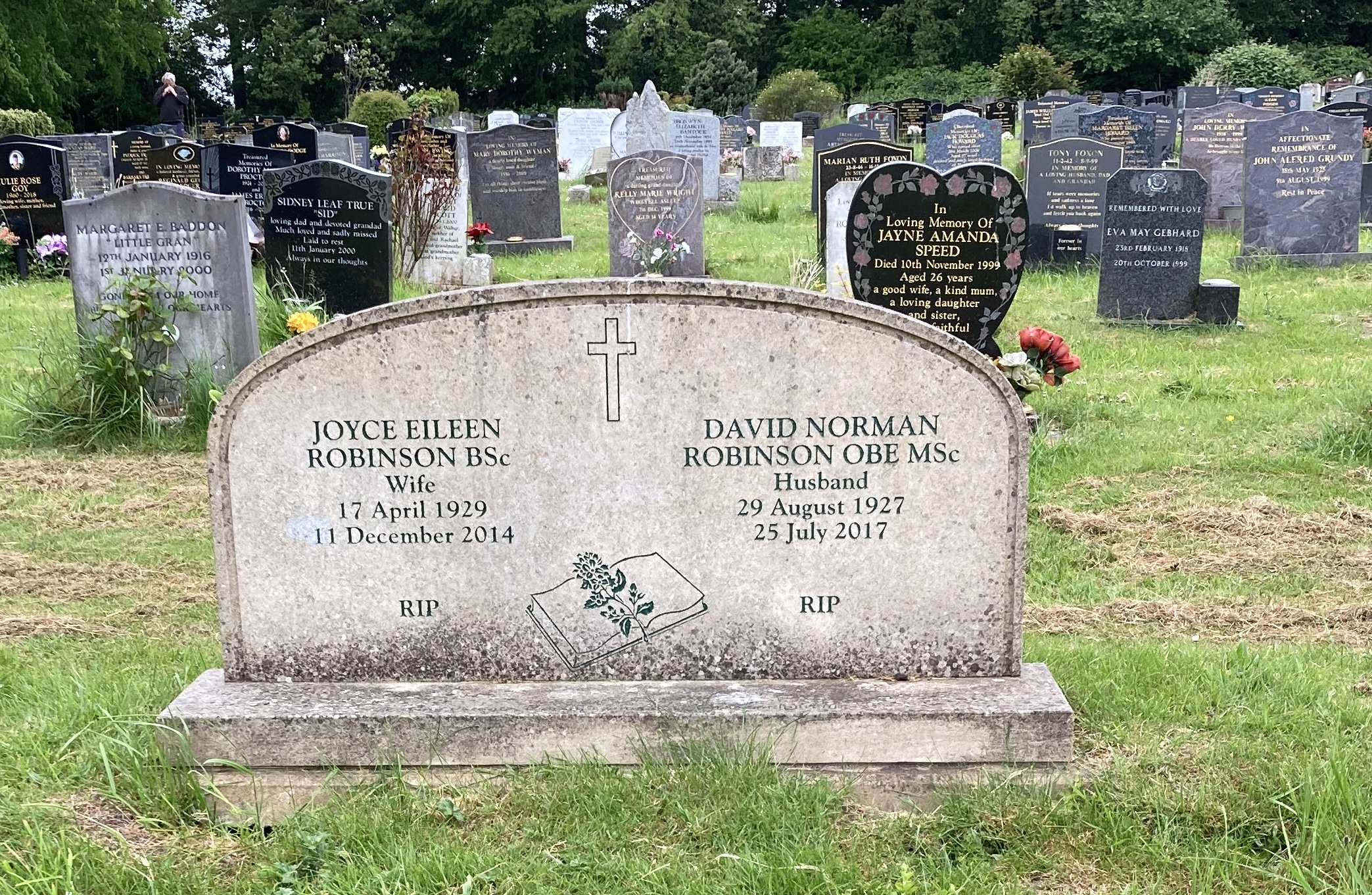
The grave of David Norman Robinson in Louth Cemetery (2023)

In 2007 a collection of papers on historical and geographical themes, titled All Things Lincolnshire: An Anthology in Honour of David Robinson, OBE was dedicated to David.

He is buried with his wife in Louth Cemetery.

== Select publications ==
- Robinson, D. N. 1989. Lincolnshire boats & bridges in camera. Buckingham.
- Robinson, D., Healey, H., and Start, D. 1999. Lincolnshire bricks : history and gazetteer. Heckington, Heritage Trust of Lincolnshire.
- Robinson, D. N. 2000. The Louth flood : the story of events of Saturday 29th May 1920. Louth, Louth Naturalists', Antiquarian, and Literary Society.
- Robinson, D. N. 2001. The book of the Lincolnshire seaside : the story of the coastline from the Humber to the Wash. Buckingham, Baron.
- Robinson, D. N. 2003. Willoughby in the Marsh. Willoughby, Willoughby Village History Group.
- Robinson, D. N. 2009.The Lincolnshire Wolds. Oxford, Windgather Press
