= Margaret Wintringham =

British politician (1879–1955)

Margaret Wintringham JP
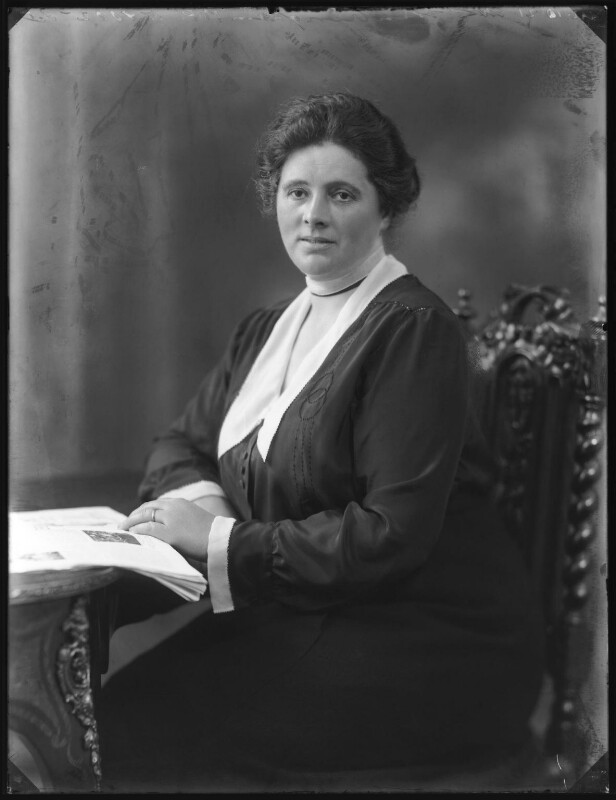
- Wintringham in 1921

Member of Parliament for Louth, Lincolnshire
- In office 22 September 1921 – 9 October 1924
- Prime Minister: David Lloyd George
- Preceded by: Thomas Wintringham
- Succeeded by: Arthur Heneage

Personal details
- Born: Margaret Longbottom; 4 August 1879 Keighley, West Riding of Yorkshire, England
- Died: 10 March 1955 (aged 75)
- Party: Liberal Party

Margaret Wintringham JP (née Longbottom; 4 August 1879 – 10 March 1955) was a British Liberal Party politician. She was elected as Member of Parliament (MP) for Louth in Lincolnshire at a by-election in September 1921, and was elected again in the 1922 and 1923 general elections. Wintringham was the second woman, and the first British-born woman, to take her seat in the House of Commons of the United Kingdom.

== Early life ==
Margaret Longbottom was born in the hamlet of Oldfield in the West Riding of Yorkshire, approximately four miles west of Keighley. She was educated at Bolton Road School in Silsden, where her father was the headteacher, and then at Keighley Girls' Grammar School. After training at Bedford Training College she worked as a teacher, eventually becoming headmistress of a school in Grimsby. In 1903 she married Thomas Wintringham, a timber merchant. They had no children.

Margaret Wintringham became a magistrate and a member of the Grimsby Education Committee. She was involved in many political movements, including the National Union of Women Workers, the British Temperance Association, the National Union of Societies for Equal Citizenship (NUSEC), the Women's Institute, the Electrical Association for Women, the Townswomen's Guild and the Liberal Party.

== Later life ==
Wintringham was a member of the Christian Science movement and died on 10 March 1955 at Hawthorne House, a Christian Science nursing home in Hampstead, London.

In 1976, the historian, Brian Harrison, conducted three interviews about Wintringham's life as part of the Suffrage Interviews project, titled Oral evidence on the suffragette and suffragist movements: the Brian Harrison interviews. Wintringham's niece, Mrs Elizabeth Neale, spoke about her aunt's personality and role in the WI, as well as her time as director of the Women's Land Army in Lincolnshire, and her friendship with Gwendolen Maclean, mother of Soviet double agent, Donald Maclean. Flora Murray, a colleague of Wintringham's, spoke about her work on a number of committees and her role in Lincolnshire politics and local government, as well as her election to Parliament and her work with Nancy Astor. Wintringham's gardener and chauffeur, Leslie Smith, was also interviewed, focusing particularly on her support of local education and her work with the WI.

== Political career ==
When her husband was elected as Member of Parliament (MP) for Louth in Lincolnshire at a by-election in June 1920, she moved with him from Grimsby to Louth and remained politically active. When Thomas Wintringham died in office in 1921, she was selected as the Liberal candidate to replace him, and on 22 September she won the 1921 Louth by-election, becoming the first female Liberal MP and the third woman elected to the House of Commons. The first woman to be elected had been the abstentionist Constance Markievicz in 1918; the first to take her seat was the Conservative Nancy Astor, a friend of Wintringham's, elected in 1919. Wintringham was elected again in the 1922 and 1923 general elections.

In Parliament, she campaigned for an equal franchise; the Representation of the People Act 1918 had extended the vote to all men over the age of 21, but only to some women over the age of 30. She also campaigned for equal pay for women, for state scholarships for girls as well as boys, and women-only railway carriages.

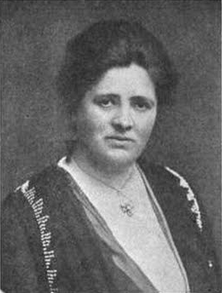
Margaret Wintringham, 1921

At the 1924 general election, she lost her seat in Parliament to the Conservative Arthur Heneage. Although she stood again in Louth at the 1929 general election and in Aylesbury at the 1935 election she did not return to the House of Commons.

She was the president of the Louth Women's Liberal Association and from 1925 to 1927 and 1932 to 1934 she was president of the national Women's Liberal Federation. In 1927 she was one of two women elected to the national executive of the National Liberal Federation. She was a vice president of the Electrical Association for Women.

== See also ==
- 1921 Louth by-election

== Sources ==
- Harrison, Elaine. "Wintringham, Margaret". Oxford Dictionary of National Biography (online ed.). Oxford University Press. doi:10.1093/ref:odnb/50055. (Subscription, Wikipedia Library access or UK public library membership required.)
- Craig, F. W. S. (1983) [1969]. British parliamentary election results 1918-1949 (3rd ed.). Chichester: Parliamentary Research Services. ISBN 0-900178-06-X.
- Iles, Larry; Ingham, Robert (Autumn 2002). "The first woman Liberal MP" (PDF). Journal of Liberal Democrat History (36). Liberal Democrat History Group: 19–21. ISSN 1463-6557.

Parliament of the United Kingdom
Preceded by Thomas Wintringham	Member of Parliament for Louth; 1921–1924	Succeeded by Arthur Heneage
Party political offices
Preceded by Violet Bonham Carter	President of the Women's Liberal Federation; 1925–1927	Succeeded by Margery Corbett Ashby
