= Christopher Hatton Turnor =

English author, architect, and social reformer

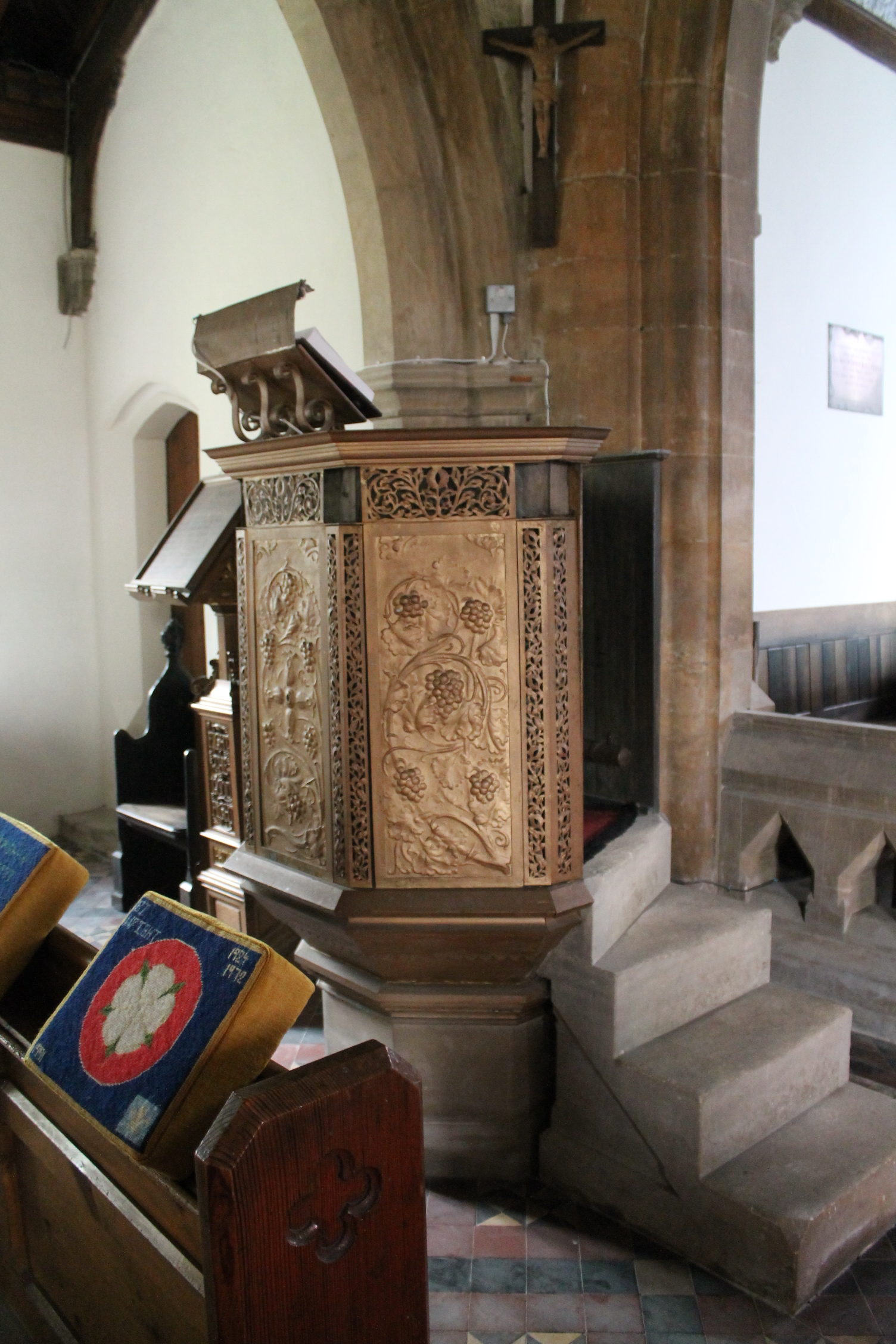
St Mary's Church, East Barkwith, pulpit designed by Christopher Hatton Turnor

Christopher Hatton Turnor (23 November 1873 Toronto – 19 August 1940) was an English author, architect, and social reformer. He is known as the designer of the Watts Gallery, Surrey and the Stoneham War Shrine, Hampshire.

== Early life ==
He was born in Toronto, Canada to Christopher Hatton Turnor (1840–1914) and his wife Alicia Killaly; his parents belonged to the Plymouth Brethren for whom his father was an evangelist. His paternal grandparents were Christopher Turnor MP and Lady Caroline Finch-Hatton, daughter of the 10th Earl of Winchilsea; Edmund Turnor MP was his uncle. His mother was the daughter of Hamilton Hartley Killaly of Toronto.

When young, Turnor shared an itinerant family life in North America. He went on to Christ Church, Oxford, England, matriculating in 1892, and graduating in 1896. He then attended the Royal Agricultural College, Cirencester.

Turnor trained as an architect under Edwin Lutyens and Robert Weir Schultz. In 1902, when he was living with his parents in Compton, Surrey, he was given the commission for the Watts Gallery there, by G. F. Watts.

== Campaigner on agriculture ==
Turnor became a publicist for agricultural reform. He co-founded, with his uncle Algernon Turnor (1845–1921), the Central Landowners' Association. He chaired a parliamentary committee that reported in 1913 on "Buildings for Small Holdings in England and Wales".

During World War I Turnor undertook government work related to agriculture, and sat on 25 committees. He was also Chairman of the Advisory Committee upon Cottages to the Board of Agriculture.

Coupland comments that "Politically, Turnor was a Tory of the modernising, 'Middle Way' type, open to planning and new economic ideas." An ally was Charles Bathurst. He and Turnor prioritised reform of the business of farming, and rural education. Later Turnor was on the advisory board of the School of Planning and Research for National Development of the Architectural Association, set up in 1935 by E. A. A. Rowse.

== Political candidate ==
Turnor was High Sheriff of Lincolnshire in 1918. He stood as a Unionist candidate in the 1920 Louth by-election caused by the death in April of that year of Langton Brackenbury, a Coalition supporter of the Lloyd George ministry. He was defeated by the Liberal Thomas Wintringham. At this point Turnor was a member of the National Democratic and Labour Party (NDP). He was adopted as a candidate by the local Conservative association. There was a tacit understanding on the side of Coalition politicians, mentioned to Lloyd George by the Whip William Dudley Ward, that his party allegiance was to the NDP.

Andrew F. Cooper saw Turnor's defeat, in an agricultural constituency, as a commentary on the politics of agricultural reform. He viewed the "rural paternalist" line, with Turnor's support of wages boards and worker representation, as a crank platform unattractive to those involved in commercial farming.

Louth by-election, 1920 Electorate
Party		Candidate	Votes	%	±%
	Liberal	Thomas Wintringham	9,859	57.3	+11.8
C	Unionist	Christopher Hatton Turnor	7,354	42.7	−11.8
Majority			2,505	14.6	
Turnout			17,213	63.1	+2.8
	Liberal gain from Unionist		Swing	+11.8	
C indicates candidate endorsed by the coalition government.

== Later life ==
Turnor was mayor of Grantham from 1928 to 1930. Over this period he supported the development of the Turnor Crescent housing scheme, in the east of the town off Hill Avenue, completed in May 1929.

Christopher Hatton Turnor died in Torquay on 19 August 1940. The funeral was on Friday 23 August 1940 at Stoke Rochford. It was written at the time

Mr. Turnor was one of the best known Eastern county farmers; he was a landowner on a very big scale.

== Family, Hall and estate ==
Turnor married in 1907 Sarah Marie Talbot Carpenter, daughter of Hon. Walter Talbot Carpenter (son of 18th Earl of Shrewsbury) and Sarah Carpenter, widow of 1st Earl of Tyrconnell. The couple settled at Stoke Rochford Hall; Turnor had inherited the Stoke Rochford property on the death of his uncle Edmund in 1903. In 1912 Turnor's address was given as Panton Hall, another Turnor family property, at Wragby (demolished 1964).

In 1906 Turnor hired the economist Charles S. Orwin, later head of the Agricultural Economics Research Institute at Oxford. From 1907 onwards he began to manage the Lincolnshire estate of 24,000 acres (9,700 ha), which had money troubles. In 1917 he sold 4,000 acres (1,600 ha), at Wragby. His obituary in Nature by E. John Russell mentioned an early interest in lucerne, and in Danish farming methods.

From the 1920s Stoke Rochford Hall hosted courses, summer schools and conferences. The Woman Teacher in 1921 reported on a "holiday course" drawing around 60 Lincolnshire students, speaking of Turnor as "a prominent educationist in the Fen country." Through John Mansbridge, Turnor brought in Geoffrey Rhoades to do decorative painting on the Hall. Turnor knew Albert Mansbridge, a Workers' Educational Association founder and father of John, through the Board of Education, and hosted events run by Margaret McMillan. Turnor was on good terms with Edward Hicks, the Bishop of Lincoln, and hosted a meeting for the Church of England committee on Industry. The Hall was run as an egalitarian open house, where social classes mixed, and met with disapproval from Lord Heneage.

There were no children of the marriage. On Christopher Hatton Turnor's death in 1940, his first cousin Major Herbert Broke Turnor (22 August 1885 – 21 February 1979), son of Algernon Turnor, succeeded to the property. He lived at Little Ponton Hall, and also owned 1,914 acres (775 ha) around Kirmond le Mire. His wife Lady Enid Vane (24 April 1894 – 9 September 1969), whom he married on 1 September 1922, was the daughter of the 13th Earl of Westmorland, and widow of Henry Cecil Vane (died 1917).

Herbert Turnor died in 1979 aged 93. Herbert's daughter Rosemary Sybil Turnor (9 September 1924 – 21 September 2015) married Alastair McCorquodale on Saturday 26 July 1947. She developed a National Garden Scheme at Little Ponton Hall, now run by her grandson.

== Works ==
- Land Problems and National Welfare (1911), Introduction by Viscount Milner.
- Land Settlement After the War (1915)
- Our Food Supply; Perils and Remedies (1916), Foreword by Edward Gerald Strutt.
- The Land and the Empire (1917)
- Land Settlement for Ex-service Men in the Oversea Dominions: Report to the Royal Colonial Institute (1920)
- The Land and its Problems (1921)
- Land Settlement in Germany (1935)
- Land Reclamation and Drainage in Italy (1938)
- Yeoman Calling (1939). By this time Turnor had found something to admire in the corporatist approach to agriculture, such as Mussolini's Battle for Land, adopted by fascist states. Jorian Jenks, linked to Turnor via the School of Planning, picked up on a 1939 paper given by Turnor given to the Farmers' Club to publicise ideas of the British Union of Fascists.

Turnor travelled for the Royal Colonial Institute, investigating migration prospects. In 1919 he visited Canada, Australia and New Zealand. For the Overseas Settlement Committee he visited Southern and East African colonies in the British Empire, in 1929 and 1930, overlapping his period as Mayor of Grantham. He left a journal of travels in South Africa and Rhodesia in 1930.

- Where are We Going?: A Manifesto to All who Live on Or by the Land of England (1923), pamphlet, written with Bernard Gilbert, preface by Lord Bledisloe. The writer Bernard Samuel Gilbert (1882–1927) lived at Stoke Rochford Hall for the last four years of his life. He published Bly Market: Moving Pictures of a Market-day in 1924.
