= Arthur Raymond Heath =

Arthur Raymond Heath (18 October 1854 – 8 June 1943) was a British Conservative politician.

He was born in Malta, son of Royal Navy Vice Admiral Sir Leopold George Heath, of Anstie Grange, Holmwood, Surrey. He was educated in part at Marlborough College, followed by Trinity Hall, Cambridge, later moving to Trinity College, graduating in Law and History in 1876. He then became a barrister in London.

He was elected to Parliament at the 1886 general election as the Conservative Member of Parliament for Louth, Lincolnshire. In the 1892 general election he was defeated by the Liberal Party candidate Robert Perks.

Heath was a J.P for the counties of Oxfordshire and Lincolnshire.

As his father had estates in Surrey, he settled there. After the outbreak of World War I he commanded a section of Surrey Special Constabulary. In 1917 he was appointed an officer commanding a platoon of the 2nd Volunteer Battalion of the Queen's Royal West Surrey Regiment within the Volunteer Training Corps, serving until the disbandment of the force in 1919.

He ultimately lived at Kitlands, Coldharbour, near Dorking, Surrey, where he died in 1943 aged 88.

Parliament of the United Kingdom
Preceded by Francis Otter	Member of Parliament for Louth; 1886–1892	Succeeded by Robert Perks
