= 1921 Louth by-election =

UK parliamentary by-election

← 1918	22 September 1921	1922 →
Candidate	Wintringham	Hutchings	George
Party	Liberal	Unionist	Labour
Popular vote	8,386	7,695	3,873
Percentage	42.2%	38.3%	19.5%
MP before election
Thomas Wintringham
Liberal
Subsequent MP
Margaret Wintringham
Liberal

The 1921 Louth by-election was a by-election held on 22 September 1921 for the British House of Commons constituency of Louth in Lincolnshire.

== Vacancy ==
The seat had become vacant following the death of the Liberal Member of Parliament (MP) Thomas Wintringham on 8 August 1921. He had been elected at the by-election in 1920.

== Electoral history ==
The result at the last election was;

T. Wintringham

1920 Louth by-election
Party		Candidate	Votes	%	±%
	Liberal	Thomas Wintringham	9,859	57.3	+11.8
C	Unionist	Christopher Hatton Turnor	7,354	42.7	−11.8
Majority			2,505	14.6	N/A
Turnout			17,213	63.1	+2.8
	Liberal gain from Unionist		Swing	+11.8	
C indicates candidate endorsed by the coalition government.

== Candidates ==
- The Liberals selected 41-year-old Margaret Wintringham, widow of the former MP, as their candidate to defend the seat. She worked as a teacher, before becoming headmistress of a school in Grimsby. She became a magistrate and a member of the Grimsby Education Committee. She was involved in many political movements, including the National Union of Women Workers, the British Temperance Association, the National Union of Societies for Equal Citizenship (NUSEC), the Women's Institute and the Townswomen's Guild. She was standing for parliament for the first time.
- On 17 August, the Unionists selected 41-year-old Sir Alan Hutchings as their candidate to challenge for the seat. He was Secretary of the Department of the Director-General of Voluntary Organisations (War Office) from 1915 to 1919. He was standing for parliament for the first time.
- The Labour Party selected Lt. James George of Peterborough as their candidate to challenge for the seat. He was standing for parliament for the first time.

== Campaign ==
Polling Day was set for 22 September 1921, 45 days after the death of the former MP, allowing for a long campaign. Despite rumours the contrary, on 13 September nominations closed to confirm that the election would be a three-way contest.

Hutchings received the official endorsement of the Coalition Government.

== Result ==
Wintringham held the seat that her husband had gained for the Liberals in a by-election the year before.

Mrs. Wintringham

1921 Louth by-election
Party	Candidate	Votes	%	±%
Liberal	Margaret Wintringham	8,386	42.2	−15.1
Unionist	Alan Hutchings	7,695	38.3	−4.4
Labour	James L. George	3,873	19.5	New
Majority		791	3.9	−10.7
Turnout		19,954	72.1	+9.0
Liberal hold		Swing		

Wintringham become only the second woman to take her seat in the House of Commons, and the first female Liberal MP.

== Aftermath ==
Wintringham was re-elected at the 1922 general election:

1922 general election
Party	Candidate	Votes	%	±%
Liberal	Margaret Wintringham	11,609	52.0	+6.5
Unionist	Alan Hutchings	10,726	48.0	−6.5
Majority		883	4.0	−5.0
Turnout		22,335	78.5	+18.2
Liberal hold		Swing		

== See also ==
- United Kingdom by-election records
- Louth constituency
- 1920 Louth by-election
- 1969 Louth by-election
- List of United Kingdom by-elections (1918–1931)

== Sources ==
- Craig, F. W. S. (1983) [1969]. British parliamentary election results 1918–1949 (3rd ed.). Chichester: Parliamentary Research Services. ISBN 0-900178-06-X.
- Leigh Rayment's Historical List of MPs
