= Perks baronets =

Extinct baronetcy in the Baronetage of the United Kingdom

Escutcheon of the Perks baronets of Wykham Park

The Perks baronetcy, of Wykham Park in the Parish of Neithrop in the County of Oxford, was a title in the Baronetage of the United Kingdom. It was created on 24 July 1908 for the Liberal politician Robert Perks. The title became extinct on the death of his son, the 2nd Baronet, in 1979.

== Perks baronets, of Wykham Park (1908) ==
- Sir Robert William Perks, 1st Baronet (1849–1934)
- Sir Robert Malcolm Mewburn Perks, 2nd Baronet (1892–1979), who left no heir.

Baronetage of the United Kingdom
Preceded by Layland-Barratt baronets	Perks baronets of Wykham Park; 24 July 1908	Succeeded by Robinson baronets
