= Cyril Osborne =

British politician

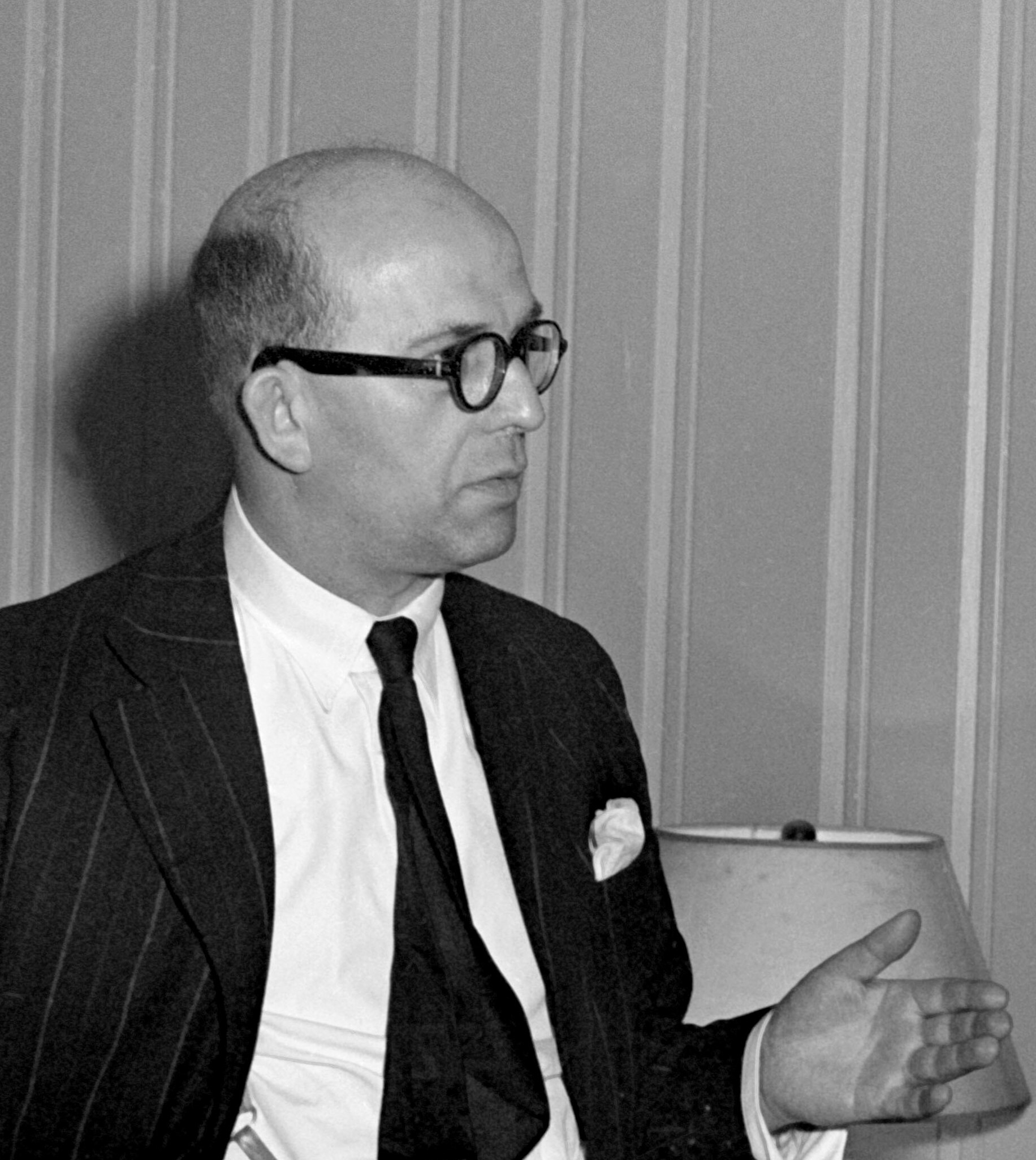
Osborne in 1947

Sir Cyril Osborne (19 June 1898 – 31 August 1969) was a Justice of the Peace for Leicestershire and British Conservative politician who served as the Member of Parliament (MP) for the Louth constituency in Lincolnshire from 1945 to his death.

== Background ==
The son of Thomas Osborne in Nottingham, Cyril Osborne was educated at University College, Nottingham, and served with the Royal Fleet Auxiliary in World War I. He married in 1935 Joyce Lawrence, née Feibusch, from Wolverhampton, and they had two sons and two daughters. One of them, Hazel, Baroness Byford, was an Opposition Spokesman in the House of Lords.

== Political career ==
He was elected on his first attempt at the 1945 general election and later became an early MP member of the Conservative Monday Club.

In the British House of Commons, he preceded Enoch Powell in arguing against immigration from the New Commonwealth countries. In 1955, the Chronicle published an extract of his views on immigration; "Last year 10,000 Jamaicans immigrated to this country. This year there will be even more unless it is stopped. I want it stopping. This is a white man's country and I want it to remain so (...) If the flood of coloured immigration is not controlled we shall have as bad a colour problem as they have in the United States of America. That to my mind would be a tragedy." In 1963, Osborne penned an article for Spectator Magazine in which he argued that "if unlimited immigration were allowed, we should ultimately become a chocolate-coloured, Afro-Asian mixed society. That I do not want".

Osborne's views on immigration were generally regarded as somewhat extreme by the Conservative Party leadership, but in March 1965, the party's MPs supported his Bill seeking to introduce "periodic and precise limits on immigration". Although the Bill failed at its first hurdle, the fact that it received the support of the Conservative Party leadership reflected the party's gradually hardening position on immigration into Britain from the New Commonwealth.

Later in 1965, he called on the Labour government of Harold Wilson to "ban all immigration except for genuine students and professional people who will return to their native countries at the end of a limited stay".

From 1964 to 1967, he was Honorary Treasurer of the Inter-Parliamentary Union (British Group) and for a longer period was Chairman of the Anglo-Soviet Parliamentary Group.

In the aftermath of the publication of the Wolfenden Report, Osborne led the opposition to decriminalisation of homosexuality in the House of Commons. He went as far as to say that "punishment is deserved by any association that brings homos together and encourages these acts that I think are repulsive. If a club incidentally or partially operates so as to bring homos together and encourage this degrading and demoralising activity, I say that it should be punished".

== Private life ==
Sir Cyril Osborne was a stockbroker and company director. He was a past master of the Company of Framework Knitters and a member of the Court of Assistants and of the Bakers' Livery Company. He was also a member of the Pilgrims Society and of the English-Speaking Union.

Parliament of the United Kingdom
Preceded by Arthur Heneage	Member of Parliament for Louth, Lincolnshire; 1945–1969	Succeeded by Jeffrey Archer
