= Francis Otter =

English Liberal politician

Francis Otter (1831 – 29 May 1895) was an English Liberal politician.

Otter was the son of Francis Otter of Ranby Hall, Wragby, and his wife Elizabeth Younger. He was educated at Gainsborough, Rugby School and Corpus Christi College, Oxford. He was called to the bar at Lincoln's Inn in 1867. He became a J.P. for Lincolnshire.

In the 1885 general election, Otter was elected Member of Parliament for Louth but did not stand again at the 1886 general election. He had intended to stand, but was taken ill suddenly on the day when nominations closed, and since his local Liberal association were unable to find another candidate for nominations closed, the Conservative candidate Arthur Raymond Heath was elected unopposed.

Otter lived at Ranby Hall. He died at the age of 64.

Otter married Emily Helen Cross in 1875.

Parliament of the United Kingdom
New constituency see Mid Lincolnshire	Member of Parliament for Louth; 1885 – 1886	Succeeded by Arthur Raymond Heath
