= Liberal Imperialists =

British Liberal Party faction

The Liberal Imperialists were a faction within the British Liberal Party in the late 1890s and early 1900s, united by views regarding the policy toward the British Empire. They supported the Second Boer War which a majority of Liberals opposed, and wanted the Empire ruled on a more benevolent basis. The most prominent members were R. B. Haldane, H. H. Asquith, Sir Edward Grey and Lord Rosebery. The group adopted a formal identity under the title "The Imperial Liberal Council", the inaugural meeting of which was held on 10 April 1900 at the Westminster Palace Hotel. That meeting was chaired by Robert William Perks. Stephen Koss described Perks`s role in the group as: "It was not Rosebery who recruited Perks as first-lieutenant, but Perks who recruited Rosebery as captain". In his 1979 paper, Thomas Boyle identified the numerical strength of the Imperialists among the Liberal Party`s representation in the House of Commons as being 51 out of a total 189 immediately prior to the 1900 general election; 53 out of a total 184 immediately after that general election; and 76 out of a total 213 at the time of the 1905 dissolution of Parliament.

== Beliefs ==
The Liberal Imperialists believed that under the leadership of William Ewart Gladstone the Liberal Party had succumbed to "faddists", sectional interests, and the "Celtic fringe" which prevented it from being a truly national party. Furthermore, the Liberal Party should include people of all classes, along with promoting working-class MPs in the Liberal Party. They also argued that the Liberals had lost the centre vote because the party had distanced itself from "the new Imperial spirit". Instead, they argued for a "clean slate", that the Liberal Party must change if it is to succeed. The old, classical Liberalism must give way to the new ideas of "National Efficiency" and imperialism.

== History ==
The grouping came to prominence shortly after the failed Jameson Raid in 1895 and prior to the outbreak of the Boer War four years later, as tensions between Britain’s South African colonies and its neighbours increased. Its leaders were members of the parliamentary Liberal Party – then in opposition – who supported the imperialist aspects of Lord Salisbury's Conservative government’s foreign policy. This stood in contrast to the radical wing of the parliamentary Liberal Party, whose prominent members included former leader William Harcourt, John Morley and David Lloyd George. Party leader Sir Henry Campbell-Bannerman, himself sceptical of Government foreign policy and particularly critical of the Colonial Secretary, Joseph Chamberlain, tried to bridge the gap between the two Liberal Party factions.

In the 1900 General Election Liberal Imperialist affiliated candidates were opposed by the Unionist Coalition. In particular, Joseph Chamberlain labelled the entire Liberal party as 'pro-Boer' and unpatriotic in the Second Boer War.

In 1902 the group changed its name from the Imperial Liberal Council to the Liberal League with more or less the same people involved. After the Liberal victory in 1906 they played major roles in the new Liberal government: Asquith, Grey and Haldane went to the Exchequer, the Foreign Office and the War Office respectively.

== Political epithet ==
In modern times, "liberal imperialism" has been increasingly used as a political epithet against liberals in the United States. This modern term is unrelated to the historic political faction. Proponents often use the term to criticize Democratic Party foreign policy, calling it a form of cultural imperialism. They claim that liberal imperialists seek to impose their cultural liberalism on foreign cultures with more socially conservative values. It has been compared to neoconservatism in that liberal imperialists are willing to use military force to achieve their goals.
