= Louth, Lincolnshire (UK Parliament constituency) =

Parliamentary constituency in the United Kingdom, 1885–1983

Louth
- Former county constituency for the House of Commons

1885–1983
- Seats: one
- Created from: North Lincolnshire
- Replaced by: Brigg and Cleethorpes and East Lindsey

Louth was a county constituency in Lincolnshire which returned one Member of Parliament (MP) to the House of Commons of the Parliament of the United Kingdom from 1885 until it was abolished for the 1983 general election.

It should not be confused with the former Irish constituency of County Louth (UK Parliament constituency). Between 1885 and 1918, its formal name was The East Lindsey (or Louth) Division of Lincolnshire, and it was sometimes referred to simply as East Lindsey.

== Boundaries ==
1885–1918: The Sessional Divisions of Louth, Market Rasen, and Wragby, and parts of the Sessional Divisions of Alford, Grimsby, and Horncastle.

1918–1950: The Borough of Louth, the Urban Districts of Mablethorpe and Market Rasen, and the Rural Districts of Caistor, Grimsby, and Louth.

1950–1974: The Boroughs of Louth and Cleethorpes, and the Rural Districts of Grimsby and Louth.

1974–1983: As prior but with redrawn boundaries.

== Members of Parliament ==
Election	Member	Party
1885	Francis Otter	Liberal
1886	Arthur Raymond Heath	Conservative
1892	Sir Robert Perks, 1st Baronet	Liberal
January 1910	Langton Brackenbury	Conservative
December 1910	Timothy Davies	Liberal
1918	Langton Brackenbury	Coalition Conservative
1920 by-election	Thomas Wintringham	Liberal
1921 by-election	Margaret Wintringham	Liberal
1924	Arthur Heneage	Conservative
1945	Sir Cyril Osborne	Conservative
1969 by-election	Jeffrey Archer	Conservative
Oct 1974	Michael Brotherton	Conservative
1983	constituency abolished	

== Election results ==
=== Elections in the 1880s ===
General election 1885: Louth
Party	Candidate	Votes	%	±%
Liberal	Francis Otter	4,801	57.2	
Conservative	James Lowther	3,594	42.8	
Majority		1,207	14.4	
Turnout		8,395	81.9	
Registered electors		10,252		
Liberal win (new seat)				

General election 1886: Louth
Party	Candidate	Votes	%	±%
Conservative	Arthur Heath	Unopposed		
Conservative gain from Liberal				

=== Elections in the 1890s ===
Perks

General election 1892: Louth
Party	Candidate	Votes	%	±%
Liberal	Robert Perks	4,284	55.4	New
Conservative	Arthur Heath	3,445	44.6	N/A
Majority		839	10.8	N/A
Turnout		7,729	78.6	N/A
Registered electors		9,829		
Liberal gain from Conservative		Swing	N/A	

General election 1895: Louth
Party	Candidate	Votes	%	±%
Liberal	Robert Perks	4,191	52.6	−2.8
Conservative	Francis Lucas	3,779	47.4	+2.8
Majority		412	5.2	−5.6
Turnout		7,970	73.4	−5.2
Registered electors		10,863		
Liberal hold		Swing	−2.8	

=== Elections in the 1900s ===
General election 1900: Louth
Party	Candidate	Votes	%	±%
Liberal	Robert Perks	4,188	56.0	+3.4
Conservative	Eyre Coote (born 1857)	3,286	44.0	−3.4
Majority		902	12.0	+6.8
Turnout		7,474	77.7	+4.3
Registered electors		9,621		
Liberal hold		Swing	+3.4	

General election 1906: Louth
Party	Candidate	Votes	%	±%
Liberal	Robert Perks	4,551	56.0	0.0
Conservative	Thomas Comyn-Platt	3,572	44.0	0.0
Majority		979	12.0	0.0
Turnout		8,123	80.6	+2.9
Registered electors		10,075		
Liberal hold		Swing	0.0	

=== Elections in the 1910s ===
General election January 1910: Louth
Party	Candidate	Votes	%	±%
Conservative	Langton Brackenbury	4,433	50.9	+6.9
Liberal	Timothy Davies	4,275	49.1	−6.9
Majority		158	1.8	N/A
Turnout		8,708	84.4	+3.8
Conservative gain from Liberal		Swing	+6.9	

Davies

General election December 1910: Louth
Party	Candidate	Votes	%	±%
Liberal	Timothy Davies	4,260	50.4	+1.3
Conservative	Langton Brackenbury	4,188	49.6	−1.3
Majority		72	0.8	N/A
Turnout		8,448	81.9	−2.5
Liberal gain from Conservative		Swing	+1.3	

General Election 1914–15

A General Election was due to take place by the end of 1915. By the autumn of 1914, the following candidates had been adopted to contest that election. Due to the outbreak of war, the election never took place.

- Liberal: Timothy Davies
- Unionist: Langton Brackenbury

General election 1918: Louth
Party		Candidate	Votes	%	±%
C	Unionist	Langton Brackenbury	9,055	54.5	+4.9
	Liberal	Timothy Davies	7,559	45.5	−4.9
Majority			1,496	9.0	N/A
Turnout			16,614	60.3	−21.6
	Unionist gain from Liberal		Swing		
C indicates candidate endorsed by the coalition government.

=== Elections in the 1920s ===
Thomas Wintringham

1920 Louth by-election
Party	Candidate	Votes	%	±%
Liberal	Thomas Wintringham	9,859	57.3	+11.8
Unionist	Christopher Hatton Turnor	7,354	42.7	−11.8
Majority		2,505	14.6	N/A
Turnout		17,213	63.1	+2.8
Liberal gain from Unionist		Swing	+11.8	

- endorsed by Coalition Government

Margaret Wintringham

1921 Louth by-election
Party	Candidate	Votes	%	±%
Liberal	Margaret Wintringham	8,386	42.2	−15.1
Unionist	Alan Hutchings	7,695	38.3	−4.4
Labour	James L. George	3,873	19.5	New
Majority		791	3.9	−10.7
Turnout		19,954	72.1	+9.0
Liberal hold		Swing		

General election 1922: Louth
Party	Candidate	Votes	%	±%
Liberal	Margaret Wintringham	11,609	52.0	+6.5
Unionist	Alan Hutchings	10,726	48.0	−6.5
Majority		883	4.0	−5.0
Turnout		22,335	78.5	+18.2
Liberal hold		Swing		

General election 1923: Louth
Party	Candidate	Votes	%	±%
Liberal	Margaret Wintringham	12,104	52.4	+0.4
Unionist	Geoffrey Peto	11,003	47.6	−0.4
Majority		1,101	4.8	+0.8
Turnout		23,107	79.6	+1.1
Liberal hold		Swing	+0.4	

General election, 1924: Louth
Party	Candidate	Votes	%	±%
Unionist	Arthur Heneage	12,674	52.8	+5.2
Liberal	Margaret Wintringham	11,330	47.2	−5.2
Majority		1,344	5.6	N/A
Turnout		24,004	80.9	+1.3
Unionist gain from Liberal		Swing		

General election, 1929: Louth
Party	Candidate	Votes	%	±%
Unionist	Arthur Heneage	13,999	44.4	−8.4
Liberal	Margaret Wintringham	13,560	42.9	−4.3
Labour	T Holmes	4,027	12.7	New
Majority		439	1.5	−4.1
Turnout		31,586	81.8	+0.9
Unionist hold		Swing	−2.1	

=== Elections in the 1930s ===
General election 1931: Louth
Party	Candidate	Votes	%	±%
Conservative	Arthur Heneage	18,434	56.1	+11.7
Liberal	Ramsay Muir	14,439	43.9	+1.0
Majority		3,995	12.2	+10.7
Turnout		32,873	81.6	−0.2
Conservative hold		Swing		

General election 1935: Louth
Party	Candidate	Votes	%	±%
Conservative	Arthur Heneage	19,705	61.64	
Labour	Jack H Franklin	12,261	38.36	New
Majority		7,444	23.28	
Turnout		31,966	71.85	
Conservative hold		Swing		

=== Elections in the 1940s ===
General Election 1939–40

A General Election was due to take place by the spring of 1940. By the autumn of 1939, the following candidates had been adopted to contest that election. Due to the outbreak of war, the election never took place.

- Conservative: Arthur Heneage
- Liberal: Alan Pryce-Jones
- Labour: Jack H Franklin

General election 1945: Louth
Party	Candidate	Votes	%	±%
Conservative	Cyril Osborne	16,333	46.18	
Labour	Jack H Franklin	11,628	32.88	
Liberal	Walter K Carter	7,176	20.29	New
Independent Liberal	Samuel Randolph Charlesworth	233	0.66	New
Majority		4,705	13.30	
Turnout		35,370	71.91	
Conservative hold		Swing		

=== Elections in the 1950s ===
General election 1950: Louth
Party	Candidate	Votes	%	±%
Conservative	Cyril Osborne	19,647	48.48	
Labour	Henry James Herbert Dyer	15,063	37.17	
Liberal	Albert William Cox	5,817	14.35	
Majority		4,584	11.31	
Turnout		40,527	82.36	
Conservative hold		Swing		

General election 1951: Louth
Party	Candidate	Votes	%	±%
Conservative	Cyril Osborne	21,587	53.66	
Labour	Henry James Herbert Dyer	15,819	39.32	
Liberal	Reginald Clifford Gaul	2,822	7.02	
Majority		5,768	14.34	
Turnout		40,228	80.46	
Conservative hold		Swing		

General election 1955: Louth
Party	Candidate	Votes	%	±%
Conservative	Cyril Osborne	21,796	58.79	
Labour	Douglas Rene Louis Maroel Poirier	15,276	41.21	
Majority		6,520	17.58	
Turnout		37,072	73.66	
Conservative hold		Swing		

General election 1959: Louth
Party	Candidate	Votes	%	±%
Conservative	Cyril Osborne	24,211	61.11	
Labour	Francis Robert Macdonald	15,408	38.89	
Majority		8,803	22.22	
Turnout		39,619	76.52	
Conservative hold		Swing		

=== Elections in the 1960s ===
General election 1964: Louth
Party	Candidate	Votes	%	±%
Conservative	Cyril Osborne	21,227	48.95	
Labour	Francis Robert Macdonald	14,188	32.72	
Liberal	Edmund Marshall	7,949	18.33	
Majority		7,039	16.23	
Turnout		43,364	77.88	
Conservative hold		Swing		

General election 1966: Louth
Party	Candidate	Votes	%	±%
Conservative	Cyril Osborne	19,977	46.37	
Labour	Robin Brumby	15,885	36.87	
Liberal	Edmund Marshall	7,222	16.76	
Majority		4,092	9.50	
Turnout		43,084	74.35	
Conservative hold		Swing		

1969 Louth by-election
Party	Candidate	Votes	%	±%
Conservative	Jeffrey Archer	16,317	58.00	+11.63
Labour	Bruce Briggs	5,590	19.87	−17.00
Liberal	John Adams	5,003	17.78	+1.02
Democratic Party	George FitzGerald	1,225	4.35	New
Majority		10,727	38.13	+28.63
Turnout		28,135		
Conservative hold		Swing	+14.3	

=== Elections in the 1970s ===
General election 1970: Louth
Party	Candidate	Votes	%	±%
Conservative	Jeffrey Archer	25,659	53.08	+6.71
Labour	James Murray	16,403	33.93	−2.94
Liberal	John Adams	6,279	12.99	−3.77
Majority		9,256	19.15	+9.65
Turnout		48,341	71.57	
Conservative hold		Swing		

General election February 1974: Louth
Party	Candidate	Votes	%	±%
Conservative	Jeffrey Archer	25,158	45.13	
Liberal	John CL Sellick	15,440	27.70	
Labour	AG Dowson	15,148	27.17	
Majority		9,718	17.43	
Turnout		55,746	79.70	
Conservative hold		Swing		

General election October 1974: Louth
Party	Candidate	Votes	%	±%
Conservative	Michael Brotherton	19,819	38.48	
Liberal	John CL Sellick	16,939	32.89	
Labour	R Mitchell	14,747	28.63	
Majority		2,880	5.59	
Turnout		51,505	73.06	
Conservative hold		Swing		

General election 1979: Louth
Party	Candidate	Votes	%	±%
Conservative	Michael Brotherton	25,701	44.85	
Liberal	John CL Sellick	19,026	33.20	
Labour	Clive Betts	12,316	21.49	
National Front	CDB Stokes	261	0.46	New
Majority		6,675	11.65	
Turnout		57,304	78.22	
Conservative hold		Swing		

== See also ==
- 1920 Louth by-election
- 1921 Louth by-election
- 1969 Louth by-election
