= 1920 Louth flood =

Natural disaster (flood)

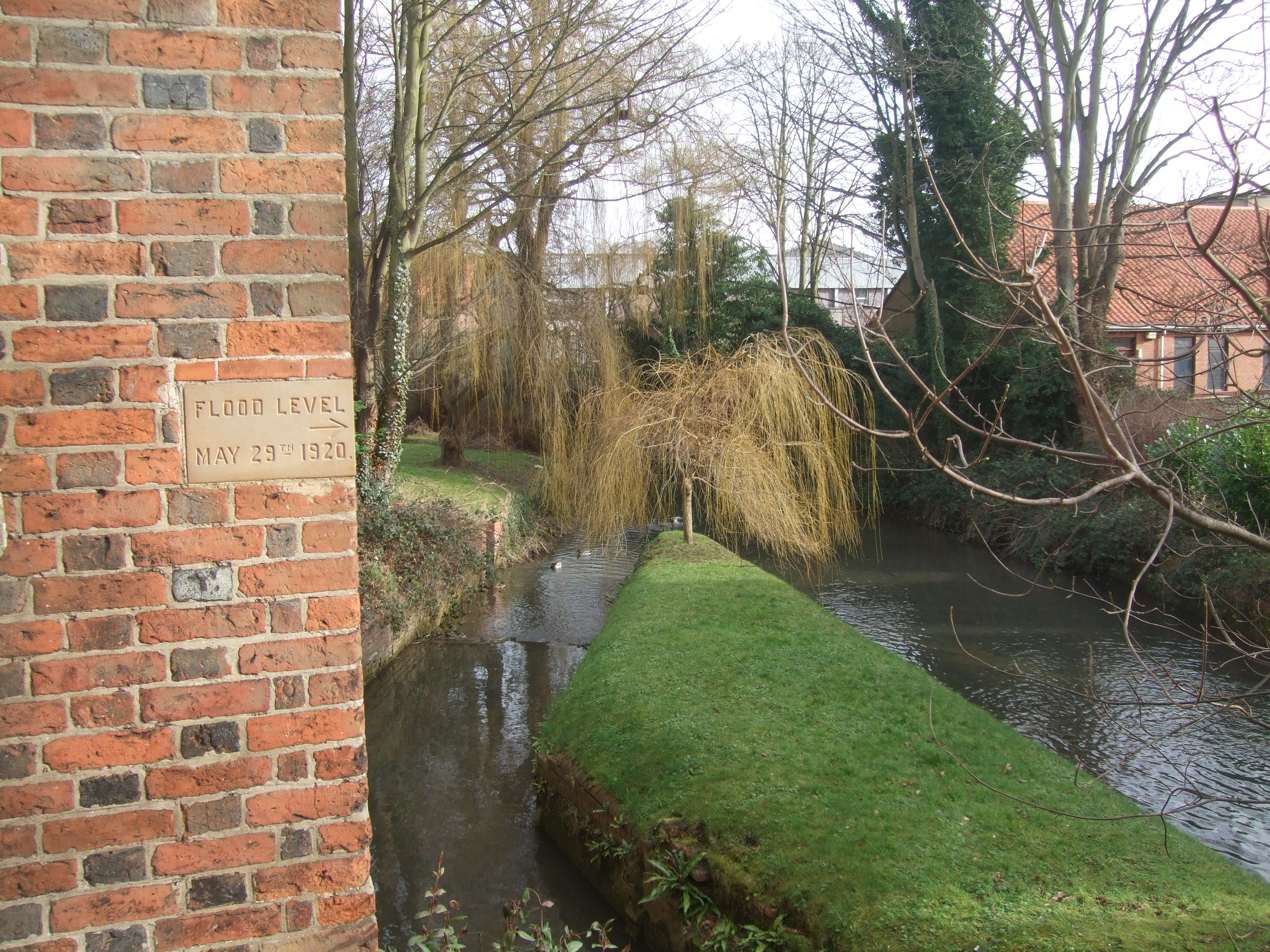
- Flood marker at Bridge Street
- Date: 29 May 1920
- Location: Louth, Lincolnshire
- Deaths: 23

The 1920 Louth flood was a severe flash flooding event in the Lincolnshire market town of Louth which occurred on 29 May 1920, resulting in 23 fatalities in 20 minutes. It has been described as one of the most significant flood disasters in Britain or Ireland during the 20th century.

== Meteorological and hydrological development ==
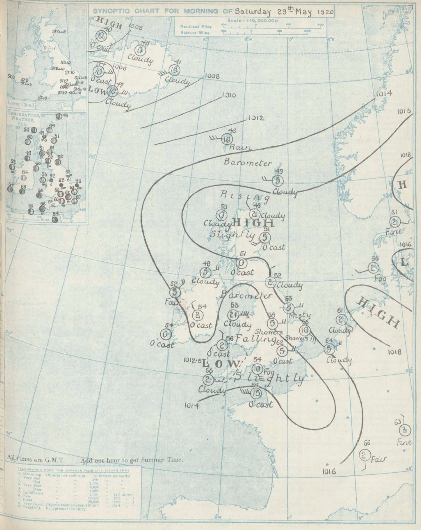
Met Office daily weather report 29 May 1920 synoptic map

The last week of May 1920 saw generally hot weather across the UK, with numerous thunderstorms developing particularly in England. The three days before 29 May had been wet across the Louth area, which left fields waterlogged and the ground saturated.

=== Rainfall ===
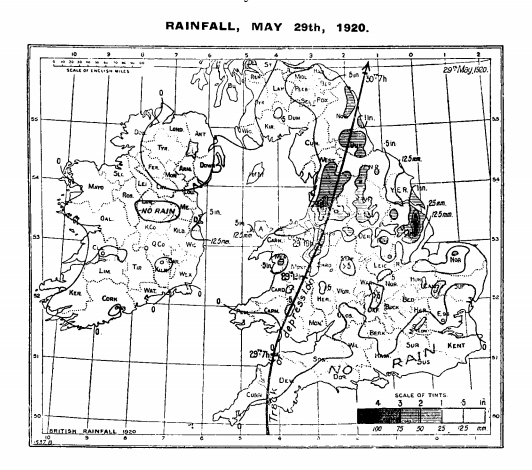
British Rainfall 1920 rainfall for 29 May 1920

In Louth, the storm broke at about 2.00 p.m. on Saturday 29 May, and lasted for about 3 hours. A considerable area of the Wolds to the west of Louth saw over 100 mm of rain. 119.1 mm fell on 29 May at South Elkington a kilometre or so north west of the town. Extreme intense rainfall was confined to over the Lincolnshire Wolds. In Louth itself, only 36 mm of rainfall fell; however, to the west over the Wolds at Elkington, 119 mm was measured, of which 116.6 mm. fell in 3 hours. Further west over the top of the Wolds, rainfall amounts could have been more. About 2 miles (3 km) south of this, 102 mm fell in 2 hours at Hallington, but the gauge overflowed at this point so that the precise amount of the fall was lost. There is reason to think that it was at least as great as at Elkington. ten miles (16 km) farther south, at Horncastle, 76 mm fell in 3 hours.

Further afield, 35 mm of rain was reported at Spurn Head and 34 mm at Cranwell. More than 50 mm fell as far west as Lincoln.

=== Flooding ===
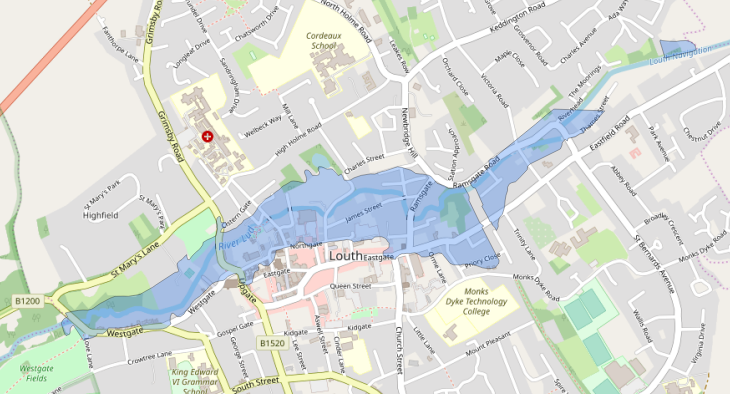
Environment Agency flood footprint of the Louth flood of 1920

The effect of the rainfall over the Lincolnshire Wolds was felt in a disastrous manner in the town of Louth. Towards the town several streams flowing from the Wolds converge to form the River Lud. The water in this usually small brook rose extremely rapidly, reportedly as much as 2 m in 10 minutes, and was at one time 4.5 m above its usual level, and a torrent up to 200 m wide swept through the town.

== Aftermath ==
The flood disaster shocked the nation, with newspapers widely covering the story, and questions raised in the House of Commons regarding the suddenness of the flood, its severity and the forecast. The event was widely covered in the press as it occurred just before the 1920 Louth by-election, held just 5 days after the flood. Many people died as they were trapped on the ground floor, deaths included four firemen swept away with their engine.

== History of flooding in Louth ==
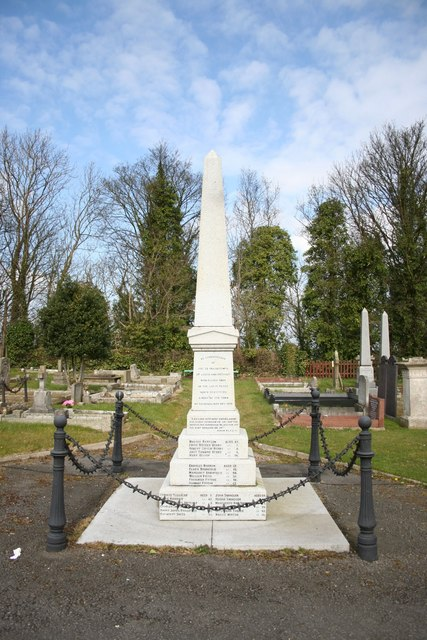
Memorial in Louth Cemetery to the 1920 flood victims

The river Lud at Louth is known to be a "rapid response" catchment, draining an area of 52km^{2}. Louth has a low flood frequency, and the behaviour of chalk catchments is not well known, which has hindered assessment of the risk to the town. As a catchment on chalk, the Lud is more likely to be affected by high-intensity short summer storms, rather than prolonged winter flooding.

It has been claimed that Lud had not previously been known to flood, though records exist for a flood on 10 January 1857. The river in the town has been known to have deadly flooding before in 1351 and in 1571. The estimated return period of the 1857 flood is 1 in 300 years, and 1920 flood a return period of 5000 years.

Other, less devastating and non-fatal floods occurred on 25 June and 20 July during the 2007 United Kingdom floods.

A recent investigation found that the storm rainfall was badly underestimated and that the peak discharge was marginally underestimated. When the revised discharge is put into the context of measured flow at Louth it is seen that similar events can and will occur in the future. The river course through the town still faces several obstructions, such as low bridges. Though the railway in town closed in 1980, in places embankments removed which may ease water flow through the town.

=== Flood relief scheme ===
Work on a £6.5 million flood relief scheme with 2 flood storage reservoirs to the west of town on tributaries to the river Lud began in July 2015, which could store 85 olympic swimming pools of water in the event of a flood. The scheme aims to reduce flood risk in Louth from 1 in 20, to a 1 in 150 probability, benefiting 355 properties in the town.

This follows a £1.2 million scheme by Anglian Water within the town in 2014–15 to enlarge sewers and build a new storm overflow to alleviate flooding in the area of Ramsgate, Eastgate and the Riverhead.
