= Stoke Rochford Hall =

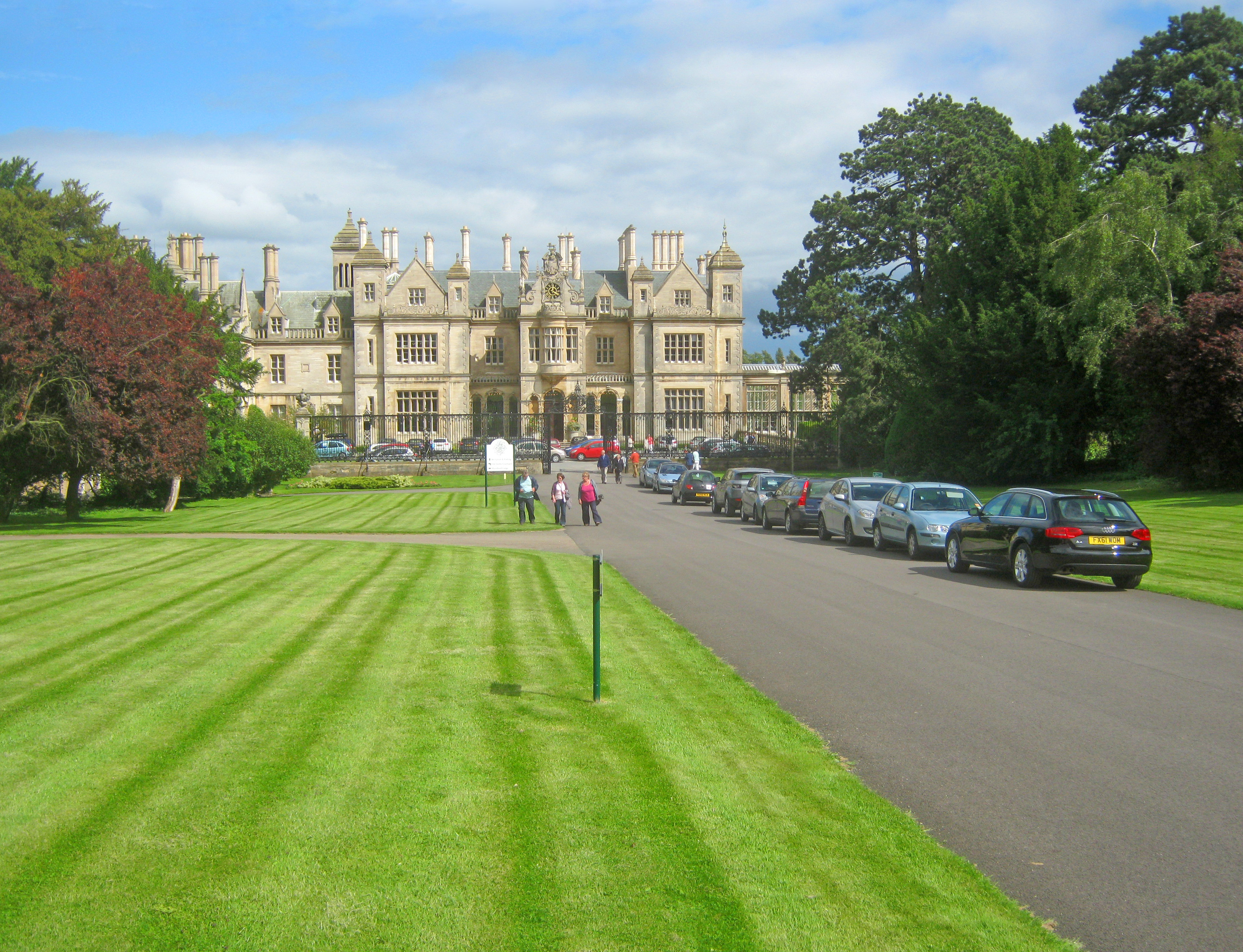
- View in July 2012

- Location within Lincolnshire
- Former names: Kesteven College of Education

General information
- Type: Country house
- Architectural style: Jacobethan
- Location: Stoke Rochford, South Kesteven, Lincolnshire
- Coordinates: 52.84197°N 0.63789°W
- Construction started: 1843

Dimensions
- Other dimensions: 28 acres (11 ha)

Design and construction
- Architect: William Burn

Stoke Rochford Hall is a Grade I listed English country house situated in scenic grounds, with a nearby golf course, next to the A1 in south Lincolnshire, England. The parkland and gardens of Stoke Rochford Hall are listed Grade II* on the Register of Historic Parks and Gardens.

== History ==
The remains of a Roman villa and bath house were identified by William Stukeley in 1739 and again in 1824 and 1960. No substantive ruins are preserved.

The Neville family had a house on the site in the 14th century. The estate passed to the Rochfords in the 15th century, whence comes the name of the estate, and to the Coneys in the 16th century. The estate was purchased by Sir Edmund Turnor around the time he was knighted in 1663. The grand house he began building in 1665 was demolished in 1774. In 1794, the Turnors built a smaller house at Stoke that was replaced by the current structure in the 1840s.

The present building dating from 1843 was designed by architect William Burn, for Christopher Turnor. For the rest of the 19th century and early 20th century, it was owned by the Turnor family. Christopher Turnor's grandson Christopher Hatton Turnor sold 6,000 acres (2,400 ha) of the Wragby estate in 1917. He started holding summer conferences at the hall. In August 1940, the estate was taken over by his first cousin, Major Herbert Broke Turnor.

=== First connection to formal education for teachers ===
To launch a novel method of providing formal education at English country houses, a large garden party was held on Saturday August 4 1923, attended by around five hundred guests, including the President of the Board of Education, Edward Wood, 1st Earl of Halifax, aged 40; Frank Tate (educator), the director from 1902-28 of the Department of Education (Victoria) in Australia; Ernest Barker, the Principal from 1920-27 of King's College London; Miss A. E. Levett, the economic historian; William T Phipps, the Kesteven chief education officer; Maudson Grant, the Lindsey director of education; and Prof T Harvey Searls, the Secretary of the British Institute of Adult Education, now known as the National Institute of Adult Continuing Education.

Harvey Searls later worked with Hilda Matheson to establish early education programmes on the new BBC radio service, and organised the Joint Committee of Inquiry into Broadcasting in relation to Adult Education, under Sir Henry Hadow. He became head of adult education at the British Council, and was awarded the Order of St Michael and St George (CMG) in 1959.

Sixty elementary school (primary school) teachers, two thirds from Kesteven and the rest from Lindsey, would attend the summer school, organised by the British Institute of Adult Education, and led by Ernest Barker, with Albert Mansbridge as deputy director.

The Nottinghamshire Education Committee also sent groups of school children to the hall in 1939, a scheme encouraged by the owner.

=== Second World War ===
In 1940 the house was requisitioned by the War Office, and used for a variety of purposes. It became the headquarters of the Second Battalion, the Parachute Regiment. The ill-fated 1944 Arnhem 'drop' was planned in the library at Stoke Rochford.

The RAF were at the Hall for two and a half years from 1940. From the 1970s the 2nd Battalion, Parachute Regiment held their annual dinner there, in May; it was their headquarters in the war for 18 months.

=== Kesteven College of Education ===
The house was purchased from the War Office by Kesteven County Council in 1948 and became home to Kesteven College of Education, a teacher-training college that closed in 1978. In January 1947 it was decided that the hall would become an 'emergency training college', under the leadership of Jeanie Paterson Slight (1890-1973), from Renfrewshire, who followed the teaching of Friedrich Fröbel. The college would be for the teaching of junior and secondary modern schools, for 100 men and 60 women, to open in early 1947; it was to open for at least three years. The deputy principal was to be a woman. Male lecturers would be paid £400 to £650, and women paid £350 to £550. Senior lecturers would be paid £600 to £750 if men, £500 to £650, if women. By 1948 it decided that the college would be for women only, and only for primary schools. Most lecturers would only be female, but rural science lecturers could also be male. Teaching would be in English, History, Geography, Religious Knowledge, Mathematics, Biology, Music, Art and Handicraft, and Physical Education.

In February 1948, Kesteven Council agreed to the conversion to a college, to cost £39,000, with £15,000 for equipment. The College planned to open in January 1949 as the Kesteven Teachers College, with 44 women in 1949. It mostly trained infant and junior teaching, with two year courses.

Miss M. Lindley was the first principal, who had also started Worcester Training College. It opened on 8 February 1949. Numbers would rise to 160. During the war and in the 1950s, it would hold fund-raising social balls, such as the Belvoir Hunt Ball, at the Kesteven Training College for Women Teachers. By 1952 there were over 100 at the Kesteven Training College. Miss Elsie Wainwright was acting principal from 1953-54.

From 1954, the Principal was William Vawdrey Warmington. He had taught at the Moat Boys' School in Leicester, now Moat Community College. He died aged 61 on 2 September 1964. Mr Samuel Raymond Dawes, a former Maths teacher, became acting principal, becoming principal in January 1965. He was educated at Taunton Grammar School and Southampton University. He started the Maths department in 1955, and lived at 341 Harlaxton Road, in Grantham. He died on 24 April 1981.

In January 1955 the college had a weekend school, run by M. W. Barley of the University of Nottingham. From 1960 the college offered three year courses, as a constituent college of the University of Nottingham Institute of Education. A similar site was at Eaton Hall, south of Retford on the former Great North Road (A638), at Eaton, Nottinghamshire, which likewise closed in 1981, and had degrees awarded by University of Nottingham. From September 1966 the college wanted to award degree courses, which was subsequently approved. The four-year BEd degree was awarded by the University of Nottingham. Bridging courses were also taught, for current teachers, to upgrade to degree status. The hall buildings were improved at the same time.

Women and men were not allowed in each others' rooms in the 1960s. There was a large fire on Friday 8 August 1969, with sixty firefighters attending for four hours from Grantham, Bourne, Corby, Brant Broughton, and Metheringham.

There were 700 men and women in 1970. In October 1970, Kesteven Education committee approved a swimming pool. On the afternoon of September 9 1971 the Under Secretary of Education, John Ganzoni, 2nd Baron Belstead, had lunch at the college, with the Kesteven Director of Education, to discuss plans for secondary education in Kesteven, later visiting the Walton Girls' School. By 1975, the college had 650 places.

Kesteven became part of Lincolnshire in 1974, which now only needed one college of education, so the county education committee put the Hall up for sale in May 1977. In October 1977, the NUT showed interest. It was sold in November 1977 for £265,000, with 21 lecture rooms, 23 offices and 102 bedrooms. The College closed in July 1978.

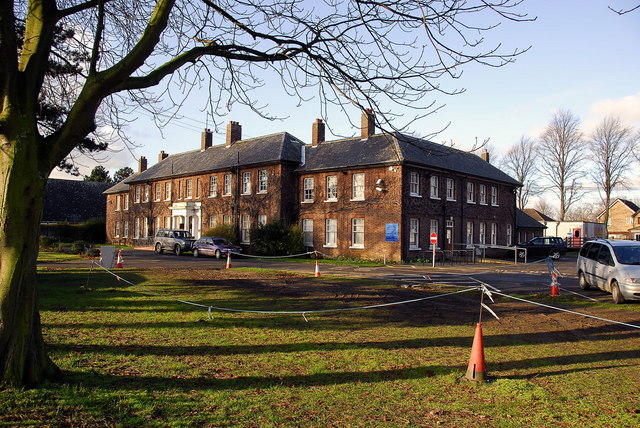
Former Peterborough annexe of the education college

In the early 1960s, an annexe was established at 9 Cottesmore Close in Westwood, Peterborough, in the former RAF Officers’ mess of RAF Peterborough. The Peterborough site had thirty places a year, for mature students, and it was not residential. In March 1975 it was proposed to amalgamate this site with Peterborough Technical College. This proposal went one stage further, to move 15 teachers to the Peterborough site in 1978, when the Kesteven site closed; the Peterborough site closed in August 1980. The deputy warden of the Peterborough annexe, Jim Robinson, became deputy head of the St Hugh's CE secondary school in 1980, and headteacher in 1990.

Former lecturers included

- Michael Hoyland, born April 1925, taught art from 1963-78; he wrote 'Art for Children: Schooling in the Middle Years', December 10 1970, ISBN 0333052420 and 'Variations: Integrated Approach to Art', January 1975 ISBN 0333143981
- Ron Wastnedge, taught science for primary schools in the early 1960s

=== National Union of Teachers ===
It retained a connection with education, as the training and conference centre of the National Union of Teachers. It was operated by the NUT from October 1978. It was formally opened on Saturday 11 November 1978. It had the Studio Theatre until around 1986. New tennis courts were built, under Stoke Rochford Management Limited.

It was not solely used by the NUT, but also by national organisations and companies for conferences or seminars because of its situation close to the A1 and Grantham railway station. On 25 January 2005, a fire gutted the interior of the hall. It was restored by English Heritage over three years at a cost of £12 million.

=== Recent history ===
The hall has banqueting facilities, a sports club and a restaurant, and it has been used for wedding receptions and parties. In 2016, it was sold to Talash Hotels Group. On 17 April 2018, Stoke Rochford Hall joined Best Western Hotels and Resorts in Great Britain as part of its BW Premier Collection.

In early 2026, Stoke Rochford Hall was acquired by The Timeless Collection Holdings Limited, an English hotel investment company. The latter is part of London-based LSG Holdings, which is owned by Italian businessman Elio Leoni Sceti and his family.

== Special events ==
From Tuesday 30 October 1979, the public inquiry into mining in the Vale of Belvoir took place at the Hall, to last until May or June 1980. On Tuesday 8 May 1979, there was a preliminary meeting, attended by the Environment Secretary and chaired by Michael Mann (judge). Local residents put their case from March 1980.

In January 1999, the Foreign Secretary gave a lecture at a meeting of the Atlantic Council. The Defence Secretary, Geoff Hoon, gave a lecture for the Atlantic Council in February 2000. The US Ambassador to NATO from 1993-98, Robert E. Hunter, gave a lecture for the Atlantic Council in February 2001.

== Architectural style ==
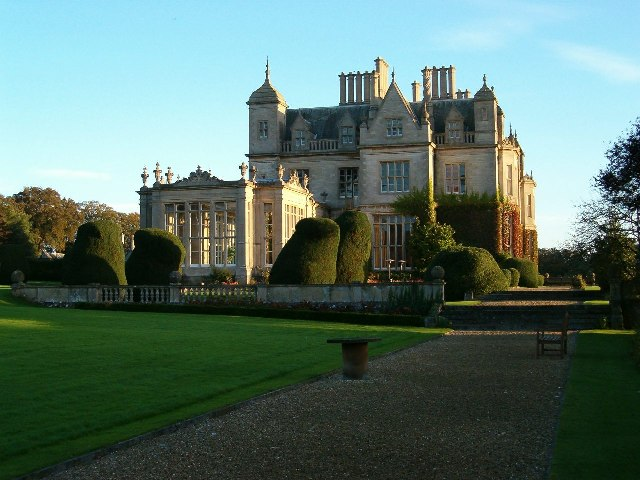
The house in October 2004

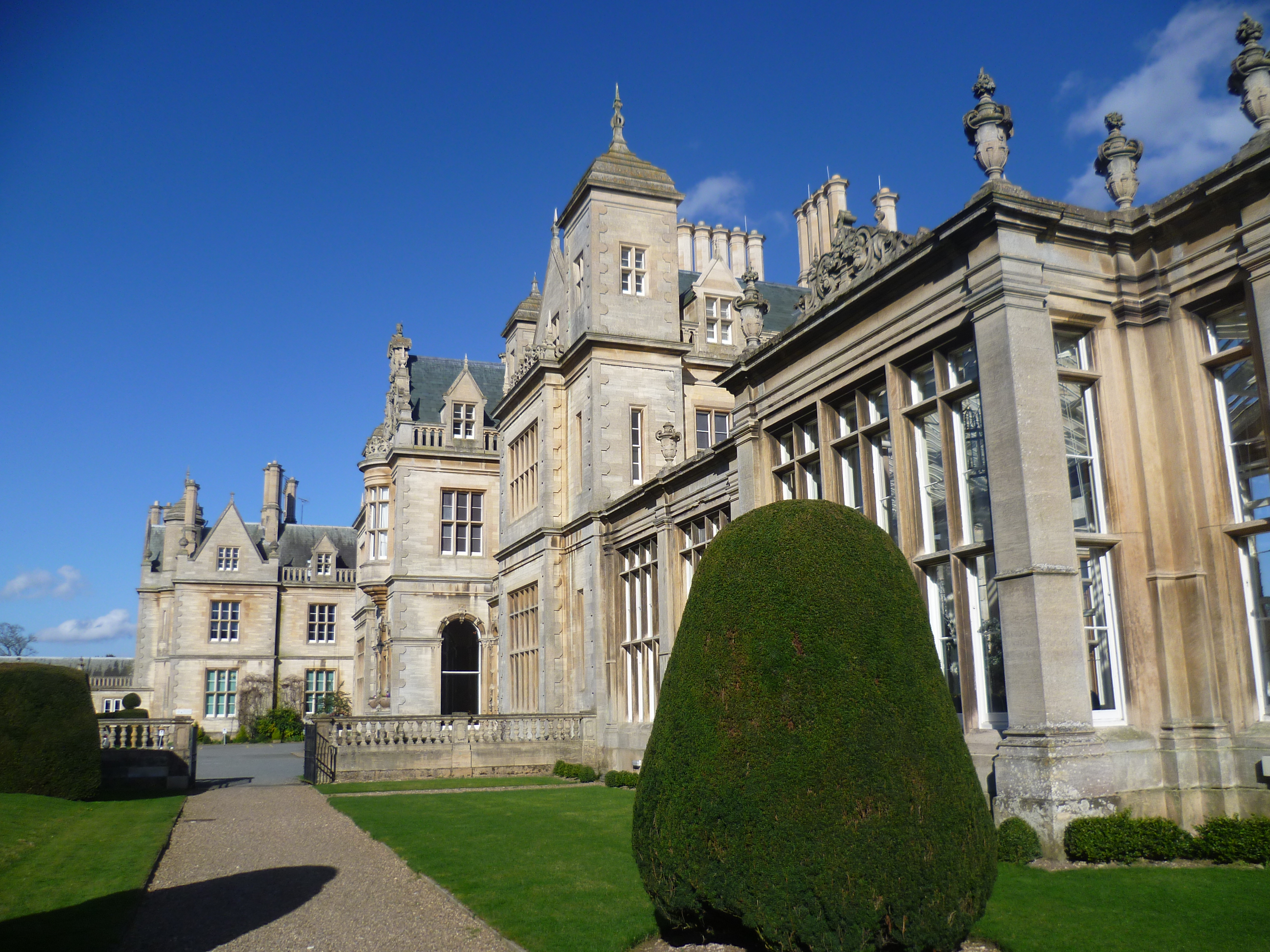
Architectural details

The hall is built in a Jacobethan style, with many chimneys. It was designed by William Burn, who also laid out the gardens in collaboration with William Andrews Nesfield. The gate lodge, also in a Jacobethan style, was designed in 1834 by Cornelius Sherborne.

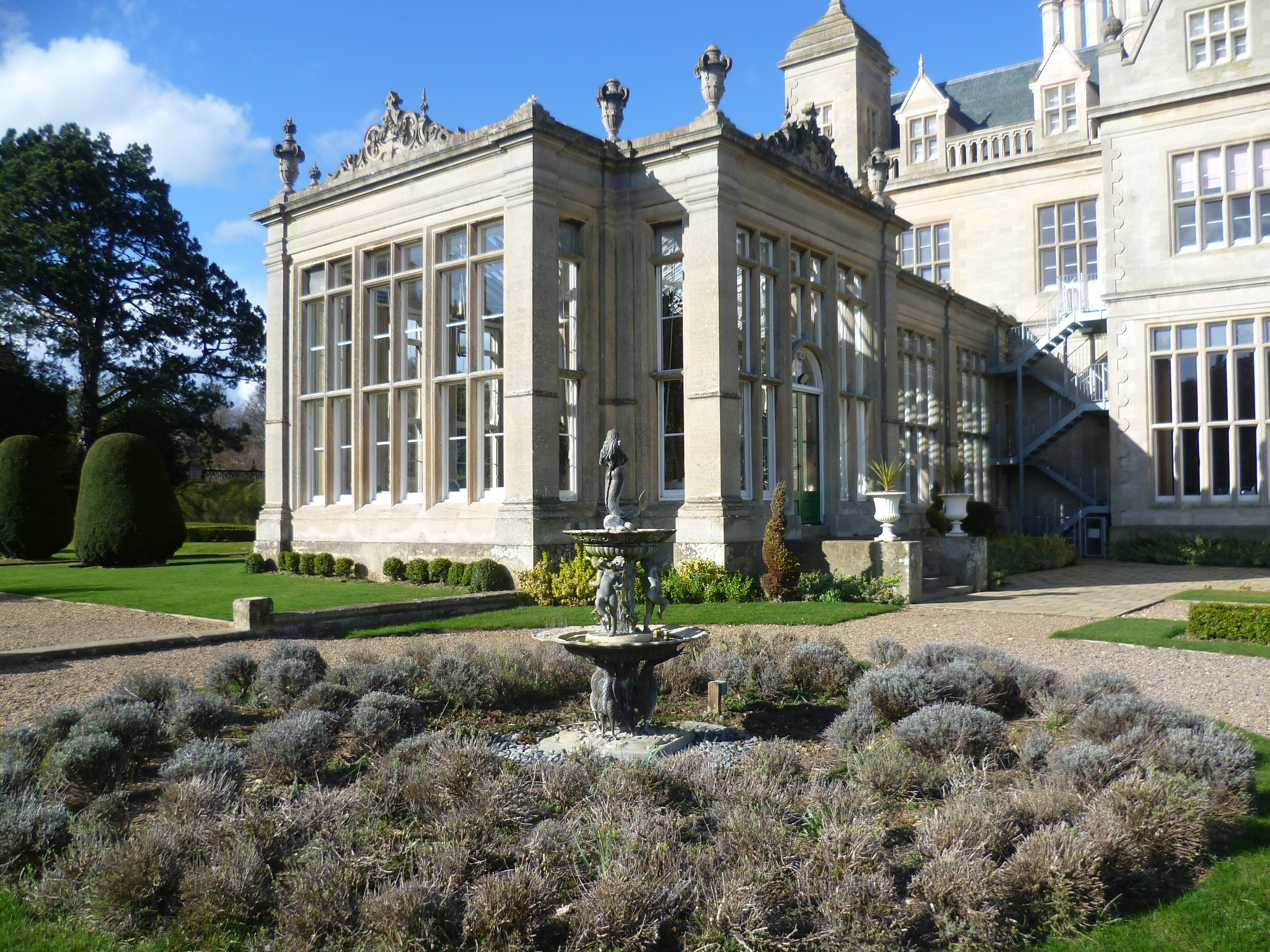
The orangery

The front elevation of the Elizabethan stables was re-erected, and the stone frontispieces still stand in the park. This carries the dates 1676 and 1704, representing their original erection and re-building.

== Golf ==
A golf course was laid out in 1924 by Christopher Turnor. It is still in use and is home to Stoke Rochford golf club.

== See also ==
- Stoke Rochford
