= Robert Perks =

British politician (1849–1934)

Robert Perks

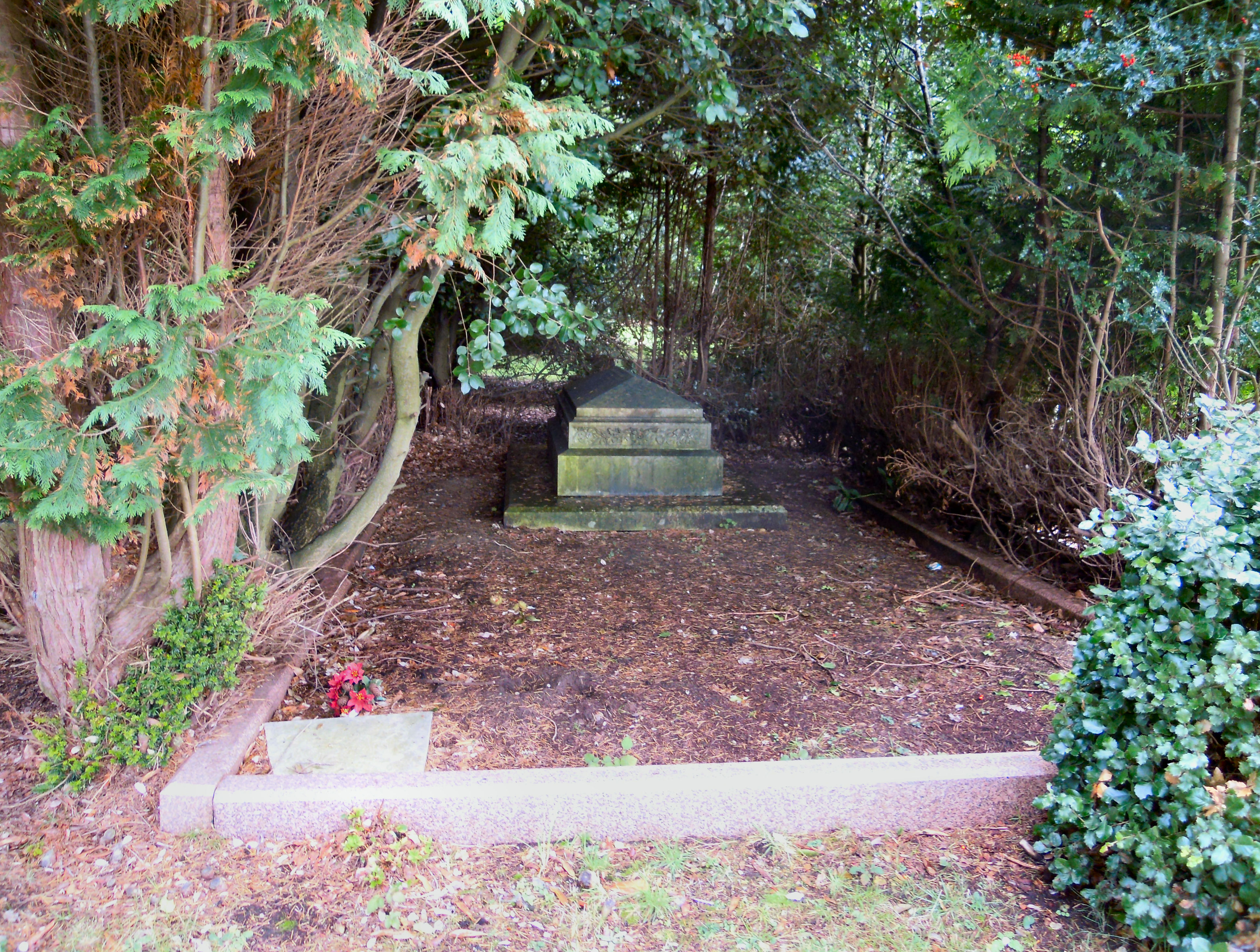
Perks's grave in Brookwood Cemetery

Sir Robert William Perks, 1st Baronet (24 April 1849 – 30 November 1934) was a British Liberal politician, lawyer, financier, and company director.

He was the son of George Thomas Perks (1819–1877), a Wesleyan Methodist preacher (who served as minister of Wesley's Chapel from 1862 to 1865, and was elected president of the Wesleyan Methodist Conference in 1873). Robert W. Perks was educated at Kingswood School (1858–65), then at a private school in Clapham run by Henry Jefferson (former head of Kingswood), and at King's College London (1866–71). He was awarded a number of prestigious prizes at the Kings College prize-ceremonies of July 1867 and July 1868 and passed the Matriculation Examination for entry to London University held in June 1869. He passed the intermediary (also known as "first") examinations for his University of London B.A. in 1870 but never completed that degree. In March 1916 he was appointed a Fellow of King's College.

He sat the examinations to enter the Indian Civil Service in 1867, 1868 and 1869, unsuccessfully in each case. Shortly after a fourth failed attempt he was articled to a firm of London lawyers in 1870. A key mentor behind his decision to embark on his path into the legal profession was Sir Francis Lycett, a friend and neighbour of George Thomas Perks, and one of the highest profile Wesleyan laymen of this period. Perks qualified as a solicitor in April 1875. He then became a partner in the legal practice of Henry Fowler, 1st Viscount Wolverhampton. Fowler, who was also a high profile Wesleyan layman of this period, and related by marriage to the Perks family, had offered Perks employment in his large Wolverhampton-based practice, but Perks succeeded in persuading him to establish a second legal business in "spacious offices" in the City of London (at 147 Leadenhall Street).

Initially this new practice was titled "Corser, Fowler and Perks". When Fowler's Wolverhampton-based partner Charles Corser retired in December 1878, this was simplified to "Fowler and Perks" One of the practice's earliest clients was a second cousin of Perks's father: George Perks of Perry Barr, Birmingham and Llandudno (1824-1892). In July 1875 George was described as being "the principal mover" in the scheme to equip Llandudno with a "Grand Promenade Pier", assisted by R.W. Perks of "Messrs. Corser, Fowler, and Perks". The only-recently-qualified R.W. Perks registered a limited liability company to take carriage of the scheme, organized the issuance of a prospectus by that company, and navigated the scheme through the Parliamentary process required for the Pier`s authorization. His work on the Llandudno Pier scheme led to Perks being commissioned for other work in North Wales including managing the negotiations required for the promotion and passage of the two Conway Bridge Acts of 1878. These Acts took the Conway Suspension Bridge out of ownership by the British central government and put it into the hands of a local body of bridge commissioners, thus allowing for substantial reductions in the tolls charged for using the bridge. His success with this project led to Perks being commissioned for his first ventures into the organizing of financial arrangements for the building of new railways.

In March 1878 Perks was elected an Associate of the Institution of Civil Engineers. Among the sponsors of his nomination were the engineers for the Llandudno Pier project (James Brunlees and Alexander McKerrow) and John Dixon, the contractor responsible for that project.

In April 1878, Perks married Edith, the youngest daughter of William Mewburn (1817-1900). The best man at this wedding was John Lawson Walton. The couple spent their honeymoon in Ventnor, Isle of Wight. They lived at "Claverley", Lubbock Road, Chislehurst, Kent from 1878 to 1894, then moving to 11 Kensington Palace Gardens - which remained their principal residence until Perks`s death. Perks retained ownership of the Chislehurst property after moving out in 1894. In the 1921 census Perks's son and his American-born wife Neysa (nee Cheney) were recorded as living there.

In 1878, Perks attended the Wesleyan Methodist Conference held in Bradford, as one of the first cohort of Lay Representatives to be admitted to attend the Conference. He was the second youngest of those 240 Lay Representatives. In 1881 he was the Wesleyan Representative on the Editorial Committee of the Proceedings of the first Oecumenical Methodist Conference, held at the City Road Chapel, London.

On 31 August 1881, Perks was formally appointed solicitor of London's Metropolitan Railway Company. Sir Edward Watkin had engaged him as legal adviser to the company's board of directors in June 1880, following friction between the board and the company's then solicitors Messrs. Burchell and Co. The company had given Burchells six months' notice of the termination of their engagement on 17 August 1881.

He was one of the twenty initial subscribers to Sir Edward Watkin's "The Submarine Continental Railway Company Limited" (registered 12 December 1881), as was his father-in-law William Mewburn. This company was renamed The Channel Tunnel Company in March 1887, after it had bought out the 1872-registered British company of that name. Perks was appointed the solicitor of this company, and managed the attempts to obtain British Parliamentary approval for the Channel Tunnel project during the 1880s.

On 17 June 1887, he was elected a director of the Barry Dock and Railway Company after he had successfully organized a small syndicate to provide the company with £300,000 of additional share capital. He remained a director of this company until July 1890, during which time he assisted in further capital-raisings, which enabled construction of the company's dock and railways to be completed. He followed up this success in arranging finance for the Barry company by organizing, during 1890 to 1891, the flotation as public companies of three substantial colliery enterprises in South Wales: D. Davis and Sons, Limited, Ferndale Steam Coal Collieries; The Penrikyber Navigation Colliery Company Limited; and The Albion Steam Coal Company Limited.

In May 1892 Perks successfully organized a company flotation with a much higher public profile: that of the Pears Soap business.

Perks was elected to Parliament at the 1892 general election as the Liberal Member of Parliament for Louth (in Lincolnshire). He was a prominent member of the Liberal Imperialists and its successor the Liberal League, in both organisations acting as treasurer.

Perks saw himself as "the member [of Parliament] for Nonconformity" and collaborated closely with Hugh Price Hughes to establish the Nonconformist Parliamentary Council in 1898. Perks was elected the first president of that body in November 1898, a post he held until succeeded by Sir George White in 1907. In his role as Treasurer of the National Council of Free Churches, he opposed the Education Act 1902, albeit unsuccessfully, but his endeavours played a role in the Liberal victory of 1906.

In 1894, he organized a syndicate of investors to provide sufficient finance to the Lancashire, Derbyshire and East Coast Railway, to enable that company to continue with the construction of its line. He and his brother-in-law Mark Oldroyd joined the board of the LD&ECR. Perks continued to be a director of that company until it was taken over by the Great Central Railway as from 1 January 1907.

In 1898, Perks proposed the creation of the Wesleyan Methodist Twentieth Century Fund (also known as the 'One Million Guinea Fund') which aimed to raise one million guineas (£1.1s. or £1.05) for a number of defined purposes including the building of a substantial Wesleyan Central Hall (and church) in Central London. The fund had raised £1,073,682 by the time it closed in 1909, part of which was used to purchase the former Royal Aquarium site for the construction of the Methodist Central Hall, Westminster.

On 5 September 1901 he was elected a director of London's Metropolitan District Railway. On the same day James Staats Forbes stood down as the company's chairman and was succeeded by Perks. Perks chaired the company until 9 February 1905 when he stood aside in favour of Charles Tyson Yerkes, and became deputy chairman. He held that role until resigning from the company's board on 31 July 1907.

He was made a baronet (of Wykham Park) on 24 July 1908, and retired from Parliament at the 1910 general election.

In 1932 at the age of 83 Perks was elected vice-president of the Methodist Conference as the man most responsible for Methodist Union.

He died in 1934 aged 85 and is buried in Brookwood Cemetery. He had four daughters (the eldest of whom, Gertrude, pre-deceased him), and one son, Robert Malcolm Mewburn Perks (1892-1979), who succeeded him in the baronetcy. His daughter, Edith Mary, married Sir Bertram Allen in 1908.

Parliament of the United Kingdom
| Preceded by Arthur Raymond Heath | Member of Parliament for Louth; 1892–1910 | Succeeded by Langton Brackenbury |
Baronetage of the United Kingdom
| New creation | Baronet (of Wykham Park); 1908–1934 | Succeeded by Robert Perks |
