= Louth Cemetery =

Cemetery in Lincolnshire, England

Coordinates: 53°21′36″N 0°00′7″W

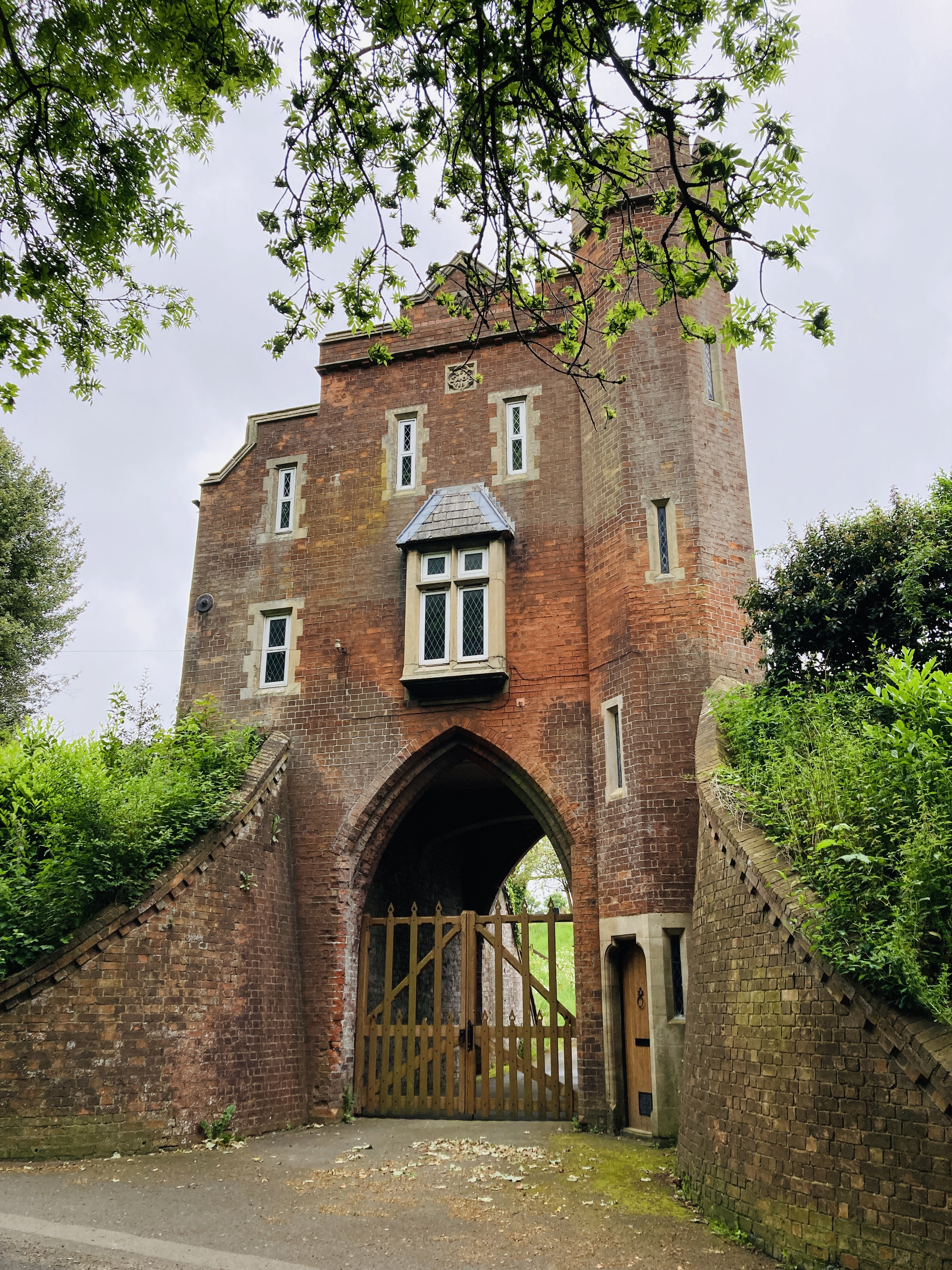
Louth Cemetery lodge house (1855) in 2023

Louth Cemetery on London Road (also known as London Road Cemetery) is the cemetery for Louth in Lincolnshire. Opened in 1855, the cemetery's distinctive gate lodge and two cemetery chapels were designed by Lincoln architects Bellamy and Hardy. The gate lodge is a Grade II listed building on the register of Historic England.

== History ==
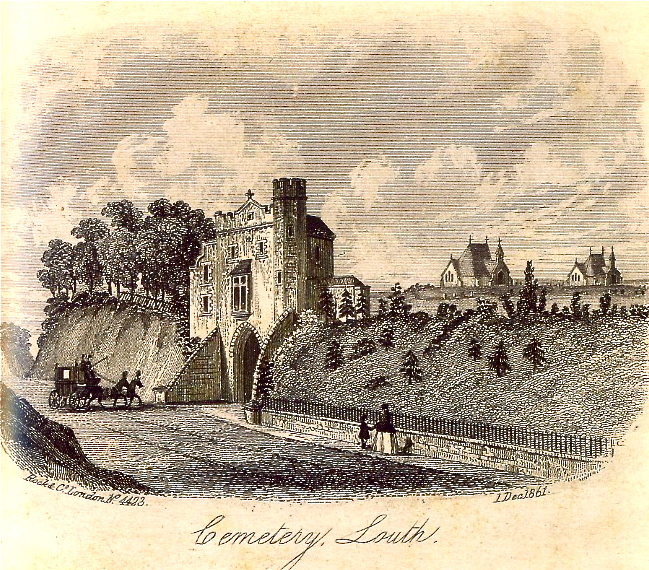
Louth Cemetery gate lodge in 1861 with the two cemetery chapels behind

Louth Cemetery was established in 1854 by Louth Burial Board. The lodge house and two chapels were built in 1855 at a cost £2,700. Louth Cemetery originally covered about 10 acres. The Anglican chapel and half the burial ground was consecrated by John Jackson, the Bishop of Lincoln on 29 December 1855, while the remaining half of the cemetery and the second chapel were reserved for the use of nonconformists. When the churchyard at the now-demolished Church of St Mary became full there was a need for a new burial ground for the town. The site for the new Louth Cemetery was chosen in 1854 after complaints from the townspeople about exposed and dismembered bodies being found at the old St Mary's burial site. This was highlighted in an article by William Brown in the Mercury newspaper in September 1843. The cemetery was extended to the west by a further 10 acres in 1884, and was again enlarged to the south in the 20th-century.

== Cemetery chapels ==
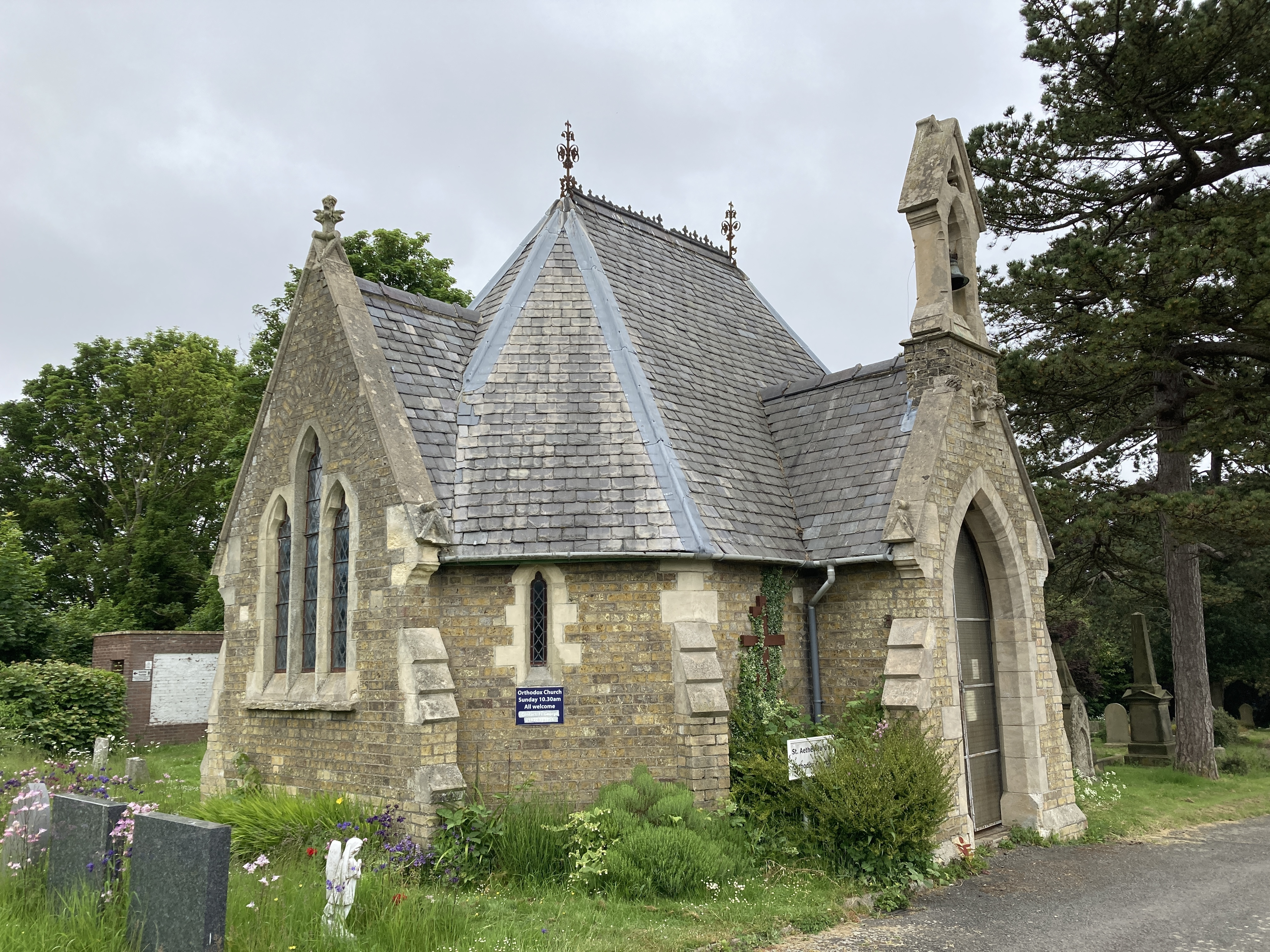
St Æthelhard's Church is located in one of the two chapels in Louth Cemetery dating to 1855

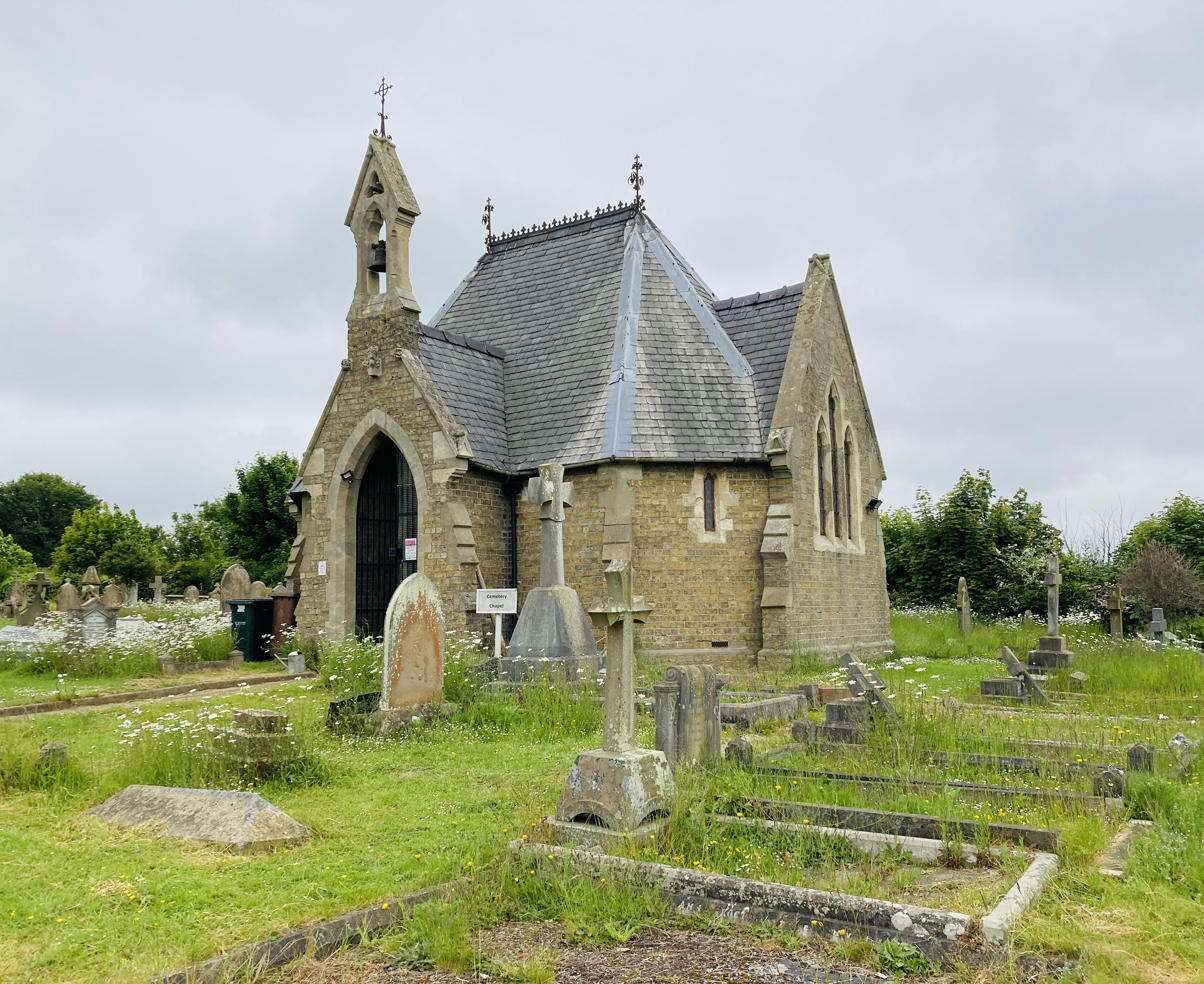
The second chapel is used by the grounds maintenance workers for storage

The cemetery has two chapels, one for Church of England funeral services and another for Dissenters. Designed by Lincoln architects Bellamy and Hardy, the chapels and the gate lodge were built in 1855 in brick with 'cut-away' corners and tall bellcotes over the porches. The two chapels and the gate lodge were completed for £2,700. The gatehouse lodge is in brick and stone dressings. A gothic arched carriageway running below the building. Tudoresque with octagonal tower with battlements. The building is entered at carriageway level through a door set in the tower. The central portion has an oriel window with an inset panel towards the top of the front elevation with the inscription 'ERECTED A.D. 185-' (the final numeral is now missing). The gatehouse was sold by Louth Town Council in 2019 and has now been brought back into domestic use. Today one of the chapels is used by the local Eastern Orthodox Church community as St Æthelhard's Church, Æthelhard having been abbot of a monastery at Louth before being named to the diocese of Winchester. The other is now used for storage for the equipment necessary to maintain the grounds of the cemetery and as a base for the groundsmen.

== Gate lodge ==
Entry to the cemetery is thorough the Gothic-style gate lodge completed in 1855 to a design by the Louth-born architect Pearson Bellamy of the architect firm Bellamy and Hardy. The lodge is constructed with red brick with ashlar stone dressings and a slate roof. It has been a Grade II listed building on the register of Historic England since 2020 owing to its largely unaltered original condition.

== Burials ==
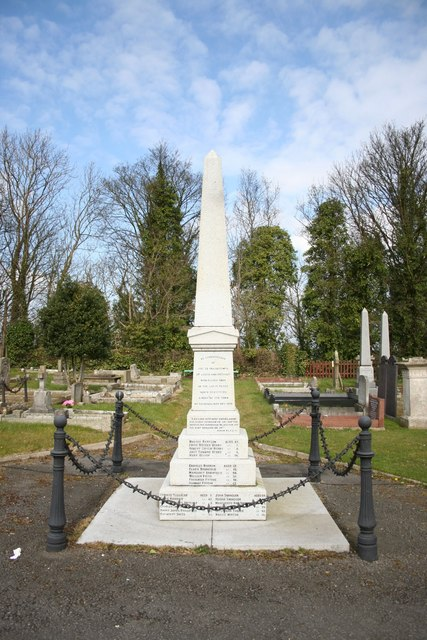
Memorial to the 1920 flood victims in Louth Cemetery

There have been over 29,000 burials at the Cemetery since it first opened in 1855. The cemetery has 14 war grave service burials from World War I and 20 from World War II with their distinctive Commonwealth War Graves Commission (CWGC) headstones.

The cemetery has a granite obelisk dedicated to victims of the Louth Flood of 1920 when a severe flash flood hit Louth on 29 May 1920, resulting in 23 fatalities in 20 minutes. It has been described as one of the most significant flood disasters in Britain and Ireland during the 20th century.

== Notable burials ==
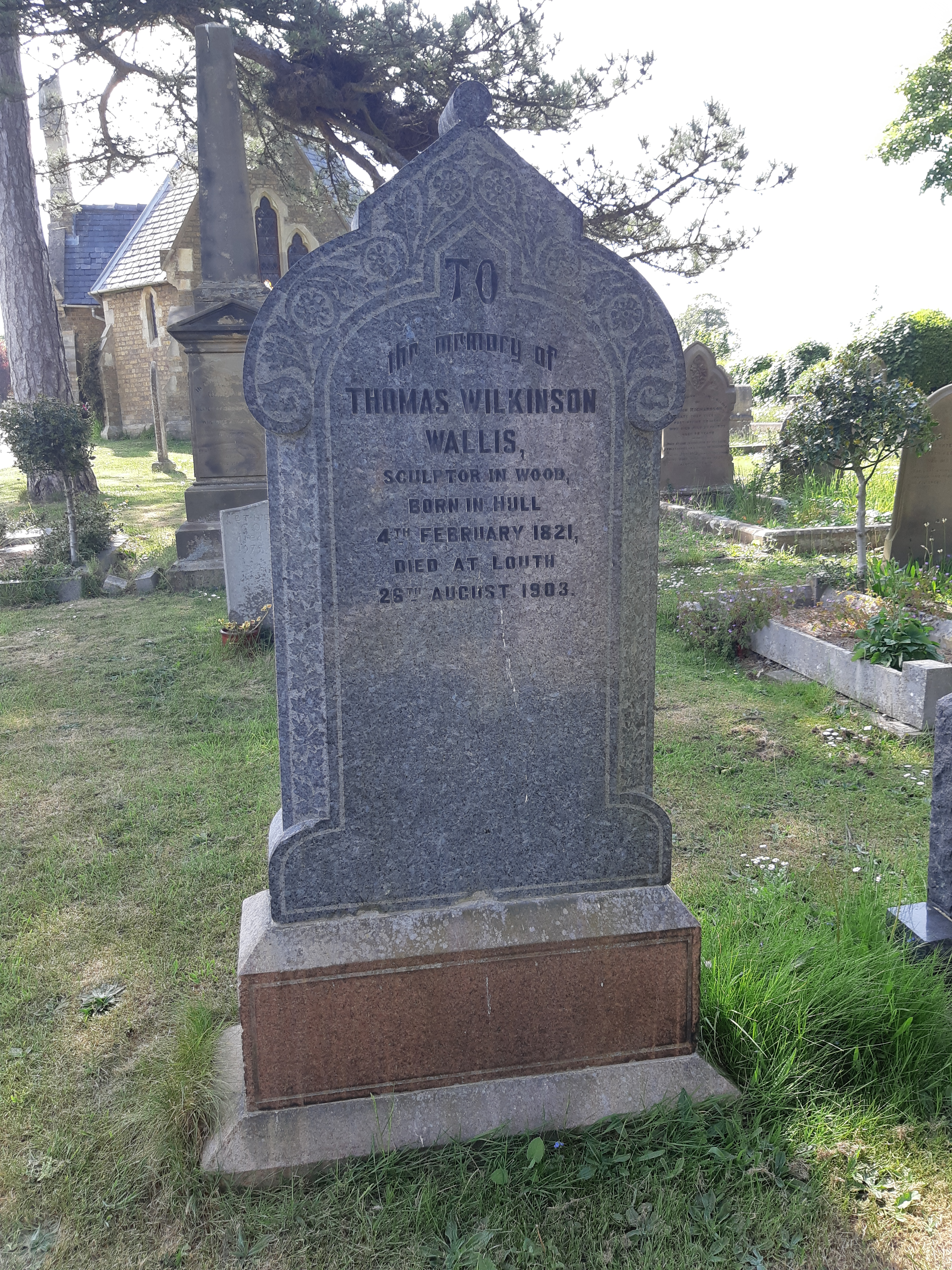
The grave of T. W. Wallis in Louth Cemetery

- The teacher and journalist David Robinson (1927-2017) is buried here.
- The sculptor and wood carver Thomas Wilkinson Wallis (1824-1903) is buried in the cemetery.
