= Hazel Byford, Baroness Byford =

British farmer and parliamentarian (born 1941)

The Right Honourable The Baroness Byford DBE DL
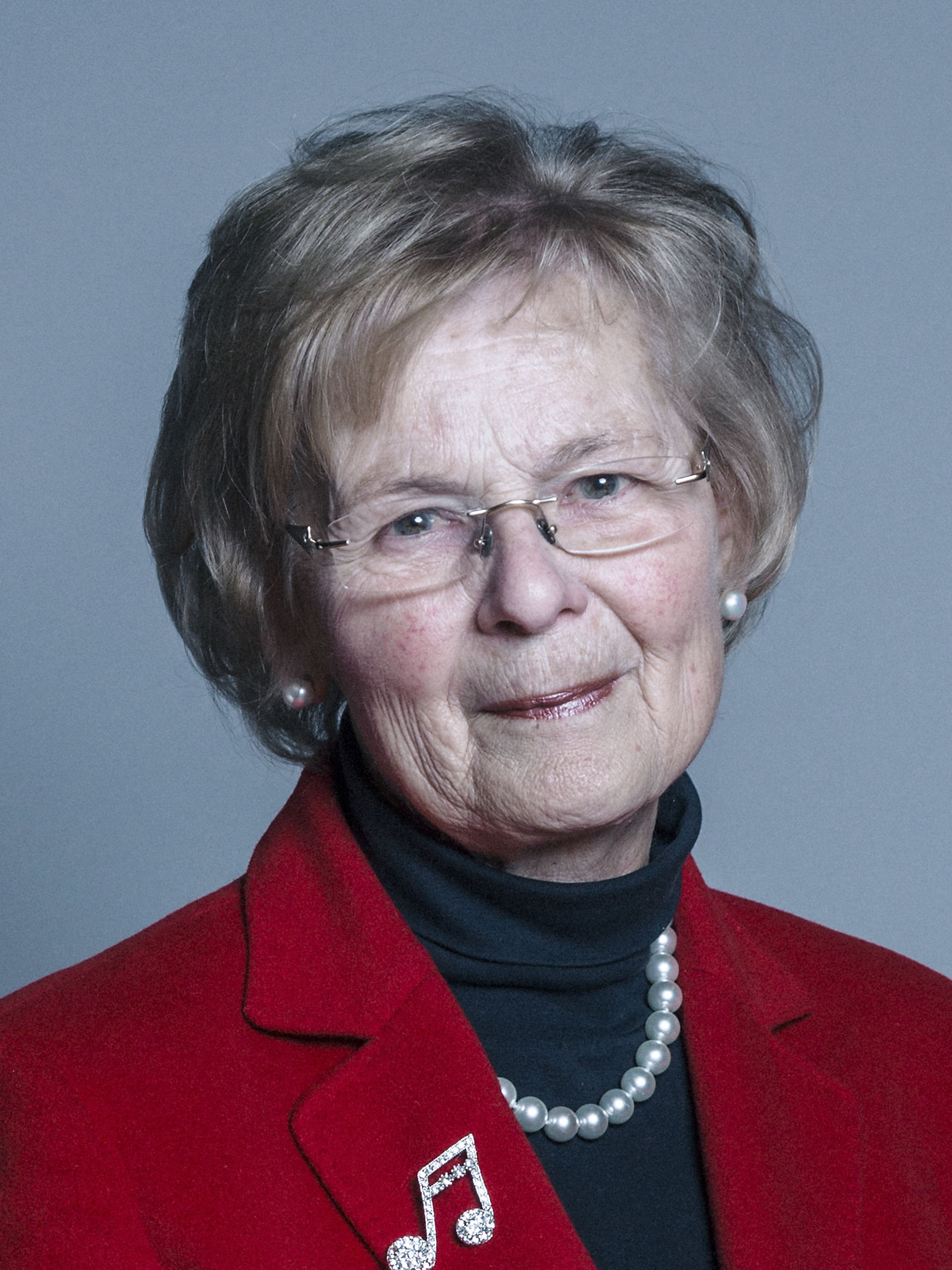

Member of the House of Lords
- Lord Temporal
- Life peerage 15 October 1996 – 5 May 2020

Personal details
- Born: 14 January 1941 (age 85)
- Party: Conservative
- Spouse: Charles Barrie Byford
- Parent: Cyril Osborne (father)

Hazel Osborne Byford, Baroness Byford, DBE, DL (born 14 January 1941) is a retired member of the House of Lords, where she served as Opposition Parliamentary Spokesman for Food, Farming and Rural Affairs from 1997 to 2007. She sat as a Conservative.

Her father, Sir Cyril Osborne, was Conservative MP for Louth, Lincolnshire from 1945 to 1969. She married, in 1962, Charles Barrie Byford, CBE (1931–2013). She was raised to the Peerage for life as Baroness Byford, of Rothley in the County of Leicestershire in 1996, having been appointed a DBE in 1994.

Byford is president of Young Leicestershire, an honorary patron of the Church Lads' and Church Girls' Brigade as well as president of The Royal Agricultural Societies of England.

From 2007 to 2010 she served as president of the Royal Association of British Dairy Farmers. She is a fellow of the Royal Agricultural Society and an honorary canon of Leicester Cathedral, Chairman of Leicester Cathedral Council. She was also formerly the President of The Women's Farming Union, National Farm Attractions Network, and the Institute of the Agricultural Secretaries and Administrators.

Byford serves as a Deputy Lieutenant for Leicestershire. She was Warden of the Worshipful Company of Farmers and was Master of the Company in 2013/2014 in the City of London and still remains an active liveryman today.

In 2008, Byford received an Honorary Doctorate of Science (Hon DSc) from Nottingham Trent University in recognition of her outstanding contribution and commitment to agriculture and rural life. She also holds Honorary Doctorates from Lincoln University, Leicester University and Harper Adams University.

== Arms ==
Coat of arms of Hazel Byford, Baroness Byford
Escutcheon Per chevron Azure and Purpure in chief two garbs Or and in base a pierced cinquefoil Ermine. Supporters On either side a hippocampus Argent gorged with an ancient crown attached to the back thereof a chain flexed Or. Motto Ad Vitam
