= Liberal League (United Kingdom) =

Grouping within the British Liberal Party

The Liberal League was a grouping within the British Liberal Party from 1902 until 1910, with Lord Rosebery as its president and H. H. Asquith, Edward Grey and Henry Fowler as its vice-presidents. It consisted largely of Liberal Imperialists and its purpose was to give unity to those Liberals who disliked the policies of the Liberal leader, Sir Henry Campbell-Bannerman.

A Liberal League candidate won the 1902 Leeds North by-election, turning a Unionist majority of over 2,500 into a Liberal majority of nearly 800.

By 1908 the League was almost moribund, but on 12 March of that year Rosebery tried to revive it by delivering a speech in which he urged the League to rally to a programme of anti-socialism, anti-Home Rule, imperialism, free trade and reform of the House of Lords. One member present said it was "the most dismal gathering he had ever attended; Lord Rosebery's audience was obviously ill at ease"; Rosebery himself wrote in his diary that his speech was "even worse than usual, partly from a clammy afternoon audience, partly from my being out of touch with politics".

The Liberal government's revolutionary People's Budget of 1909 caused a storm of controversy. At League meetings of 25 and 28 June, members of the League were suspicious of following Rosebery in condemning the Budget due to his indecisive character and failure to lead. On 9 September 1909 Rosebery resigned the presidency of the League. The next day, he delivered a greatly anticipated speech in Glasgow in which he condemned the Budget as the "negation of faith, of family, of property, of monarchy, of Empire". Asquith wrote to him the day after the speech, declaring that it was impossible to serve under his presidency, not realising Rosebery had already resigned it. The League was formally dissolved in May 1910. The League`s papers passed into the possession of Sir Robert William Perks. After his death in 1934, they were "disposed of" by Perks`s son Robert Malcolm Mewburn Perks and F. Freeman-Thomas (by then the Marquess of Willingdon).
