= West Grantham Church of England Secondary Academy =

School in Grantham, Lincolnshire, England

Location
- The Avenue; Dysart Road; Grantham, Lincolnshire, NG31 7PX; England
- 52.90773°N 0.66229°W

Information
- Type: Academy
- Religious affiliation: Church of England
- Trust: Diocese Of Southwell and Nottingham Multi-Academy Trust
- Department for Education URN: 148433 Tables
- Ofsted: Reports
- Head: Clare Barber
- Gender: Mixed
- Age: 11 to 16
- Enrolment: 489 as of January 2015
- Website: Official website

West Grantham Church of England Secondary Academy is a Church of England mixed secondary school in Grantham, Lincolnshire, England.

== History ==
Built and established in the 1960s as St Hugh's Church of England Secondary School, it later became St Hugh's CofE Mathematics and Computing College as a foundation school administered by Lincolnshire County Council. It closed as such on 31 January 2011, converting to an academy on 1 February 2011 and renamed The West Grantham Academy St Hugh's.

A January to February 2018 Ofsted inspection of the school, then as The West Grantham Academy St Hugh's, rated it as Grade 4 'Inadequate' for overall effectiveness, one of 46 schools in Lincolnshire so rated. An ongoing monitoring inspection in 2018 noted improvements in quality of leadership and management.

Following the reports, in early 2019 the "struggling" school, with its associated Bluecoat Meres Primary School, was taken under the auspices of the Archway Learning Trust. The school was then renamed Bluecoat Meres Academy. However, by November 2019 it was announced that the schools would be reverting to the West Grantham Academies Trust.

In January 2021 the school was taken over by the Diocese Of Southwell and Nottingham Multi-Academy Trust and was renamed West Grantham Church of England Secondary Academy.

== Curriculum ==
The curriculum of West Grantham Church of England Secondary Academy includes teaching towards GCSEs and BTECs.
