= Langton Brackenbury =

British politician

Henry Langton Brackenbury (26 April 1868 – 28 April 1920) was a British Conservative Party politician who served for two short periods as Member of Parliament (MP) for Louth in Lincolnshire. He was born in Colchester, Essex, to Major Henry Brackenbury and Anna Galliard Bowles.

He was first elected at the general election in January 1910. However the victory was short-lived as he was defeated in the December 1910 general election by the Liberal candidate Timothy Davies. He regained the seat at the 1918 general election, but died in office in 1920, aged 52.

The by-election after his death, was won by the Liberal candidate Thomas Wintringham.

He died on the 28th of April 1920 at Headington, Oxfordshire.

Parliament of the United Kingdom
Preceded by Sir Robert Perks, Bt	Member of Parliament for Louth; January 1910–December 1910	Succeeded by Timothy Davies
Preceded by Timothy Davies	Member of Parliament for Louth; 1918–1920	Succeeded by Thomas Wintringham
