= 1969 Louth by-election =

UK Parliamentary by-election

The 1969 Louth by-election was a by-election held on 4 December 1969 for the British House of Commons constituency of Louth in Lincolnshire.

The seat had become vacant on the death on 31 August of the Conservative Member of Parliament (MP) Sir Cyril Osborne. He had held the seat since the 1945 general election.

The result was a victory for the Conservative candidate Jeffrey Archer. Archer held the seat until the October 1974 general election, when he stepped down due to financial difficulties and began writing popular novels.

== Result ==
Louth by-election, 1969
Party	Candidate	Votes	%	±%
Conservative	Jeffrey Archer	16,317	58.00	+11.63
Labour	Bruce Briggs	5,590	19.87	−17.00
Liberal	John Adams	5,003	17.78	+1.02
Democratic Party	Sir George FitzGerald	1,225	4.35	New
Majority		10,727	38.13	+28.63
Turnout		28,135		
Conservative hold		Swing	+14.3	

== Last General election ==
General election 1966: Louth, Lincolnshire
Party	Candidate	Votes	%	±%
Conservative	Cyril Osborne	19,977	46.37	
Labour	Robin Brumby	15,885	36.87	
Liberal	Edmund Marshall	7,222	16.76	
Majority		4,092	9.50	
Turnout		43,084	74.35	
Conservative hold		Swing		

== See also ==
- Louth constituency
- 1920 Louth by-election
- 1921 Louth by-election
- List of United Kingdom by-elections
