= Timothy Davies (politician) =

British politician (1857–1951)

Timothy Davies

Timothy Davies (17 January 1857 – 22 August 1951) was a British Liberal Party politician. He represented Fulham as a Borough Councillor, Borough Alderman, County Councillor, Mayor and Member of Parliament.

== Background ==
Timothy Davies was born in Llanpumsaint, Carmarthenshire where he spent his childhood years until later moving to Liverpool to become an apprentice in the textile industry. In 1885, he founded his own company in Fulham, London but maintained strong links with Wales as evidenced when he commissioned a stone fountain for Carmarthen Park in 1899.

== Political career ==
In 1896 he was elected a member of Fulham Vestry as a Progressive. He continued as a councillor of the new Fulham Borough Council in 1900. In 1901 he was elected mayor of the borough council, serving from 1901 to 1902. In 1903 he was appointed a borough alderman. In 1901 he was elected to the London County Council as a Progressive Party candidate, gaining Fulham from the Conservative-backed Moderate party.

1901 London County Council election: Fulham
| Party | Candidate | Votes | % | ±% |
|---|---|---|---|---|
| Progressive | Timothy Davies | 5,341 | 29.3 | +5.5 |
| Progressive | Peter Lawson | 5,259 | 28.9 | +5.1 |
| Conservative | Edward George Easton | 3,497 | 19.2 | −6.7 |
| Conservative | Cameron Gull | 3,483 | 19.1 | −7.3 |
| Independent | James Edwin Cooney | 645 | 3.5 | n/a |
| Progressive gain from Conservative | | Swing | | |
| Progressive gain from Conservative | | Swing | +6.2 | |

He was re-elected in 1904 and served until 1907.

He was a supporter of the Temperance movement. For many years he had a close friendship with David Lloyd George who had an affair with Davies's wife, Lizzie. In 1906 he completed his hat-trick of Fulham representation when he gained the parliamentary seat at the General Election;

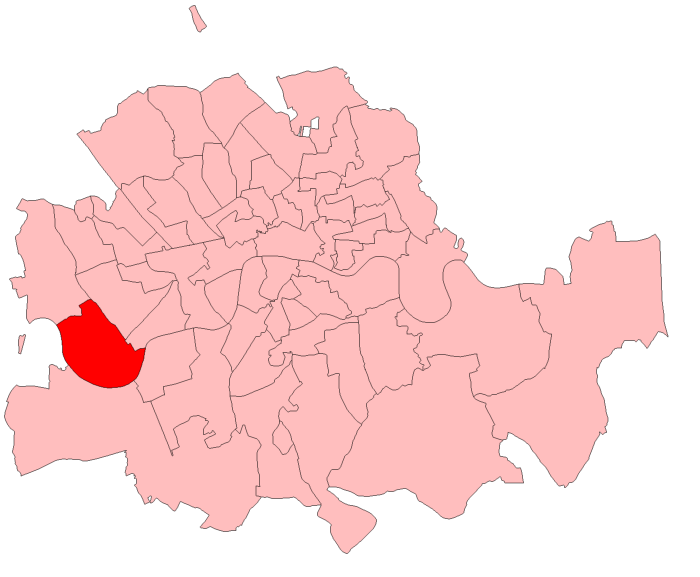
Fulham in London 1900-18

1906 General Election: Fulham
| Party | Candidate | Votes | % | ±% |
|---|---|---|---|---|
| Liberal | Timothy Davies | 8,037 | 52.0 | +12.6 |
| Conservative | Hayes Fisher | 7,407 | 48.0 | −12.6 |
| Majority | | 630 | 4.0 | 25.2 |
| Turnout | | 20,620 | 74.9 | +9.9 |
| Liberal gain from Conservative | | Swing | +12.6 | |

In 1910, rather than seek re-election at Fulham, he switched constituencies to contest Louth in Lincolnshire;

General election January 1910: Louth
| Party | Candidate | Votes | % | ±% |
|---|---|---|---|---|
| Conservative | Langton Brackenbury | 4,433 | 50.9 | +6.9 |
| Liberal | Timothy Davies | 4,275 | 49.1 | −6.9 |
| Majority | | 158 | 1.8 | 13.8 |
| Turnout | | | 84.4 | +3.8 |
| Conservative hold | | Swing | | |

Despite failure, he fought the seat again 11 months later;

General election December 1910: Louth
| Party | Candidate | Votes | % | ±% |
|---|---|---|---|---|
| Liberal | Timothy Davies | 4,260 | | |
| Conservative | Langton Brackenbury | 4,188 | | |
| Majority | | | | |
| Turnout | | | | |
| Liberal gain from Conservative | | Swing | | |

In 1912 he voted against and in 1917 he voted in favour of giving votes to women. In 1916 he supported the introduction of Conscription. In 1918, he was absent during the key Maurice debate. He sought re-election at the 1918 election but found that the Coalition 'coupon' had been issued to his Unionist opponent;

General election 1918: Louth
| Party | Candidate | Votes | % | ±% |
|---|---|---|---|---|
| Unionist | Langton Brackenbury | 9,055 | 54.5 | |
| Liberal | Timothy Davies | 7,559 | 45.5 | |
| Majority | | 1,496 | 9.0 | |
| Turnout | | 16,614 | 60.3 | |
| Unionist gain from Liberal | | Swing | | |

Davies did not stand for Parliament again.

As well as serving as an MP Timothy Davies also became a Justice of the Peace and an Income Tax Commissioner. He died in 1951, aged 94.

Parliament of the United Kingdom
| Preceded by Hayes Fisher | Member of Parliament for Fulham; 1906–1910 | Succeeded by Hayes Fisher |
| Preceded by Langton Brackenbury | Member of Parliament for Louth; December 1910–1918 | Succeeded by Langton Brackenbury |
