= Thomas Wintringham (Liberal politician) =

Thomas Wintringham

Thomas Wintringham (22 August 1867 – 8 August 1921) was a British Liberal Party politician. He was elected as Member of Parliament (MP) for Louth in Lincolnshire at a by-election in June 1920, but died in office the following year, aged 53. He died suddenly in the House of Commons reading room in the Palace of Westminster.

The resulting by-election in September 1921, Louth's second by-election in under 16 months, was won by his wife Margaret Wintringham, who became the second woman to take a seat in the British House of Commons.

Parliament of the United Kingdom
| Preceded by Langton Brackenbury | Member of Parliament for Louth; 1920–1921 | Succeeded by Margaret Wintringham |
