= Weigall =

Weigall is a surname. Notable people with the surname include:

- Albert Bythesea Weigall (1840–1912), English -born Australian schoolmaster
- Archibald Weigall (1874–1952), British Conservative politician
- Arthur Weigall (1880–1934), English Egyptologist
- Evelyn Weigall, English cricketer
- Gerry Weigall (1870–1944), English cricketer
- Henry Weigall (1829–1925), English Victorian painter
- Henry Weigall (1800–1883), English sculptor (father of the painter above)
- Louis Weigall (1873–1957), English cricketer
- Lady Rose Weigall (1834–1921), British philanthropist and biographer
