= Louis Weigall =

English cricketer and British Army officer

Personal information
- Full name: Louis Arthur Frederick Weigall
- Born: 14 December 1873; Marylebone, Middlesex, England
- Died: 13 February 1957 (aged 83); Folkestone, Kent, England
- Batting: Unknown
- Bowling: Unknown
- Relatives: Gerry Weigall (brother); Evelyn Weigall (brother)

Domestic team information
- Years: Team
- 1907–1914: Lincolnshire
- 1917/18–1919/20: Europeans

Career statistics
Competition	First-class
Matches	7
Runs scored	171
Batting average	13.15
100s/50s	–/1
Top score	57
Balls bowled	221
Wickets	5
Bowling average	31.80
5 wickets in innings	–
10 wickets in match	–
Best bowling	2/41
Catches/stumpings	4/–
- Source: ESPNcricinfo, 17 February 2019

Louis Arthur Frederick Weigall (14 December 1873 – 13 February 1957) was an English first-class cricketer and British Army Officer. Weigall served in the Royal Lincolnshire Regiment and the South Staffordshire Regiment during the First World War, and later played first-class cricket in British India.

== Early life and military career ==
Born in Marylebone, Middlesex, Weigall was son of a Victorian artist, Henry Weigall (best known for his portrait of Benjamin Disraeli in 1878–1879), and his wife, Lady Rose Sophia Mary Fane, daughter of John Fane, 11th Earl of Westmorland, and wife Priscilla Anne Wellesley-Pole. Through his mother, he was connected to the Duke of Wellington. A younger brother was Lieutenant Colonel Sir William Ernest George Archibald Weigall, 1st Baronet, KCMG, a Conservative Member of Parliament who was Governor of South Australia. One of his older brothers was the cricketer Gerry Weigall (born Gerald John Villiers Weigall). Another brother, Evelyn, was also first-class cricketer.

Weigall was educated at Wellington College, before enlisting in the Rifle Brigade as a Second Lieutenant in December 1892. He was promoted to the rank of lieutenant in October 1893, with promotion to captain following in February 1898. He transferred to the Royal Berkshire Regiment in that same year.

Weigall ran a fishing company in Grimsby during the first decade of the 1900s, with the company ceasing to trade in 1909. Being located in Grimsby meant he played minor counties cricket for Lincolnshire from 1907–1914, making eight appearances in the Minor Counties Championship.

== World War I and first-class cricket ==
Weigall served during the First World War as a captain in the Lincolnshire Regiment, though he was seconded to the South Staffordshire Regiment in January 1917. During his secondment he was promoted to the rank of major in December 1917. He served in British India with the South Staffordshire Regiment, during which he made his debut in first-class cricket for the Europeans against the Parsees at Bombay in December 1917.

Weigall spent two years in India playing first-class cricket. He played for Lord Willingdon's XI in March 1918. In the days before India had Test status, Weigall played a first-class match in November 1918 for England against India at Bombay, playing alongside his brother Gerry. The match was a mock Test match celebrating the signing of the armistice to halt the war. He played seven first-class matches in India, scoring 171 runs at an average of 13.15, with a high score of 57. As a bowler, he also took 5 wickets.

He died at Folkestone on 13 February 1957.
