= Hotchkin =

Hotchkin is a surname which originates from ancient Anglo-Saxon tribes of Britain and means the son of Hodge.

People with the name Hotchkin include:

- Allan Hotchkin (born 1943), Australian rules footballer
- Jason Hotchkin (born 1978), American soccer player
- Neil Hotchkin (1914–2004), English first-class cricketer
- Stafford Hotchkin (1876–1953), English soldier, politician and High Sheriff of Rutland

== See also ==
- Hodgkin
