= Peter Tapsell =

Peter Tapsell may refer to:

- Peter Tapsell (British politician) (1930–2018), British Conservative Member of Parliament
- Peter Tapsell (New Zealand politician) (1930–2012), first Māori Speaker of the New Zealand House of Representatives 1993–1996
