= Frederick Linfield =

British politician (1861-1939)

Frederick Caesar Linfield

Member of Parliament for Mid Bedfordshire
- In office 15 November 1922 – 9 October 1924
- Preceded by: Max Townley
- Succeeded by: William Warner

Personal details
- Born: 1861
- Died: 2 June 1939 (aged 77–78)
- Party: Liberal

Frederick Caesar Linfield (1861 – 2 June 1939) was a British Liberal politician. He was originally in trade as a corn-merchant.

== Local politics ==
Linfield in 1893

Linfield first entered politics at local government level. He was a member of Worthing Council in West Sussex, having been one of the first councillors when Worthing was newly incorporated as a Borough in 1890 and was Mayor of Worthing twice from 1906-08. He was also an Alderman of the Borough.

In 1907, during his mayoral term, he formally welcomed General William Booth of the Salvation Army to Worthing. He recalled that during the days when the Salvation Army was first campaigning there in the mid-1880s, it was deeply unpopular because of all the undesirables who were attracted to its banner for moral and physical sustenance. He told General Booth that he had himself hidden two Salvationists from the hostile crowds for two weeks.

== Parliamentary candidate ==
Linfield stood for Parliament at the general election of December 1910 as the Liberal candidate in Horncastle in Lincolnshire but he was defeated by 524 votes by the sitting Conservative MP Lord Willoughby d’ Eresby, who had held Horncastle at each election since 1895. Linfield was soon given another chance at Horncastle however when, only days after the general election, Lord Willoughby succeeded to the peerage on the death of his father, Lord Ancaster. Linfield was formally re-adopted as Liberal candidate on 5 January 1911 in opposition to the new Conservative candidate Captain Archibald Weigall, who had fought the nearby seat of Gainsborough at the December 1910 general election. The by-election was called for 16 February 1911 but Linfield was not expected to win, given the Unionist hold on the seat in recent times and an analysis of the past results and new voters on the roll enabled the correspondent of The Times to forecast correctly that the Unionists would hold the seat.

== The result ==
1911 Horncastle by-election: Horncastle
Party	Candidate	Votes	%	±%
Conservative	Archibald Weigall	4,955		
Liberal	Frederick Linfield	4,848		
Majority		107		

== Member of Parliament ==
Linfield does not seem to have stood for election at the 1918 United Kingdom general election but in 1922 he was the Liberal candidate in Mid Bedfordshire. He won the seat with a majority of 2,737 over the sitting Unionist MP Max Townley. In the 1923 general election, Linfield faced a three-cornered contest with a Labour candidate also standing. Linfield had his majority cut to 2,023 but he described the Labour candidate, Robert Widgell, as a Free Trader like himself and claimed that Widgell had just taken votes which would otherwise have gone to him.

== Empire interests ==
Linfield took a strong interest in questions relating to the British Empire and in particular to the development of the Colonial Territories. He had travelled abroad privately and had visited the British colonies in West Africa. In 1924 he was appointed as a Member of the East African Parliamentary Commission. He accompanied the other members of the Commission to Kenya, Uganda, Tanganyika, Nyasaland and Northern Rhodesia, looking into the condition of the Colonies, their government, trade, infrastructure and social arrangements. The report of the Parliamentary Commission was published in May 1925 and various proposals for development and reform were put forward. However the Commission never questioned the colonial status quo, or the role or predominance of white settlers, endorsing their ‘civilizing mission’ and approving the continuing administration of the territories, holding them in trusteeship for the natives (sic). They also gave tacit approval for the continued development of the Highlands of Kenya as an increasingly white colony with, what they described as, "....a distinctive type of British civilisation". Linfield also wrote a 13 page supplementary memorandum to the report in which he proposed the setting up of an Imperial Development Board. He followed this up with an article in the Contemporary Review of March 1926 on ‘Empire Development’.

== 1924 general election ==
Linfield was away on this Parliamentary mission in Africa when the 1924 general election was called. He campaigned by telegraph appealing to his electors from Uganda that he hoped they would stand by him while he was away on Empire business. He also called on the Tories not to oppose him while he was doing his Imperial duty but the Conservatives rightly believed they had a good chance of winning Mid Bedfordshire this time and refused to stand their candidate down. The Labour party, whose government had sent Linfield to East Africa, did however agree not to stand a candidate, as they had in 1923 but despite the contest reverting to a straight fight with the Tory, Linfield lost by 961 votes.

== Parliamentary candidate again ==
In 1926, Linfield was adopted as Liberal candidate for the Howdenshire Division of Yorkshire for a by-election following the resignation of the sitting Conservative Lt. Colonel, the Hon. Stanley Jackson, who had been an England test cricketer before entering Parliament and who resigned on his appointment as Governor-General of Bengal. A keen fight was anticipated, especially on land and agricultural issues in what was to be a three-cornered contest. On polling day it was reported that voting was interfered with by fog and early polling was very light. However the area was a strong one for the Tories. Jackson had been unopposed at the general elections of 1923 and 1924. Linfield came second, nearly 4000 votes behind the victorious Tory Major William Carver, with the Labour candidate losing his deposit.

Linfield seemed prepared to try to get back into Parliament. At the 1929 general election he returned to his former political stamping ground of Horncastle in an effort to defeat the sitting Conservative MP Henry Haslam. In a three-cornered contest he came second to Haslam but 2,669 votes behind. He then agreed to be adopted as Liberal candidate for Stoke Newington for the 1931 general election but for some reason he withdrew his candidacy and did not stand at the election.

== Other public and political work ==
In 1927 Linfield served on a committee of the Liberal Party to look into the organisation of the party in the London constituencies. In July 1928, he was a member of a deputation from the National Council for the Prevention of War which met the Foreign Secretary, Sir Austen Chamberlain in connection with the Kellogg-Briand Pact. And in a role related to his interest in Imperial affairs, Linfield was secretary to the Native Races and Liquor Traffic Committee (an organisation promoting temperance among indigenous peoples in the Empire, especially Africa).

Parliament of the United Kingdom
Preceded by Max Townley	Member of Parliament for Mid Bedfordshire; 1922–1924	Succeeded by William Warner
