= 1895 Kesteven County Council election =

1895 English local government election

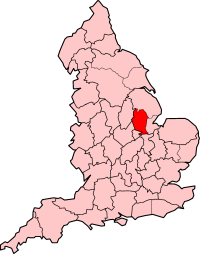
The administrative county of Kesteven (1889–1974), shown within England.

The third set of elections to Kesteven County Council were held on Thursday, 7 March 1895. Kesteven was one of three divisions of the historic county of Lincolnshire in England; it consisted of the ancient wapentakes (or hundreds) of Aswardhurn, Aveland, Beltisloe, Boothby Graffoe, Flaxwell, Langoe, Loveden, Ness, and Winnibriggs and Threo. The Local Government Act 1888 established Kesteven as an administrative county, governed by a Council; elections were held every three years from 1889, until it was abolished by the Local Government Act 1972, which established Lincolnshire County Council in its place.

Forty-six electoral divisions of the new Council were outlined in December 1888. For the 1892 election, Sleaford and Bourne, which were initially two member divisions, were split, the former into Sleaford East and Sleaford West, the latter into Bourne and Morton. Nearly every candidate was returned unopposed, with contests in only eight divisions. Of these, six involved political parties; the Liberals won four and the Conservatives two.

== Results by division ==
=== Ancaster ===
Ancaster
Party	Candidate	Votes	%	±%
	William Avery	NA	NA	

=== Barrowby ===
Barrowby
Party	Candidate	Votes	%	±%
	C. G. E. Welby JP	NA	NA	

=== Bassingham ===
Bassingham
Party	Candidate	Votes	%	±%
	Charles Constable Curtis JP	NA	NA	

=== Bennington ===
Bennington
Party	Candidate	Votes	%	±%
	William Hutchinson	NA	NA	

=== Billingborough ===
Billingborough
Party	Candidate	Votes	%	±%
	Captain Edward Smith JP	NA	NA	

=== Billinghay ===
Billinghay
Party	Candidate	Votes	%	±%
	John Creasey	NA	NA	

=== Bourne ===
Bourne and Morton
Party	Candidate	Votes	%	±%
	James Measures	258		
	Thomas Carlton	175		
Turnout		433		

=== Bracebridge ===
Bracebridge
Party	Candidate	Votes	%	±%
Conservative	Hugh Jackson	162		
Liberal	Charles W. Pennell	123		
Turnout				

=== Branston ===
Branston
Party	Candidate	Votes	%	±%
	W. S. Fox	NA	NA	

=== Bytham ===
Bytham
Party	Candidate	Votes	%	±%
	Thomas Williamson	NA	NA	

=== Caythorpe ===
Caythorpe
Party	Candidate	Votes	%	±%
	William Oxley	NA	NA	

=== Claypole ===
Claypole
Party	Candidate	Votes	%	±%
	George Nevile JP	NA	NA	

=== Colsterworth ===
Colsterworth
Party	Candidate	Votes	%	±%
	Eli Crabtree	NA	NA	

=== Corby ===
Corby
Party	Candidate	Votes	%	±%
	The Lord Willoughby de Eresby MP	NA	NA	

=== Deeping ===
Deeping
Party	Candidate	Votes	%	±%
	William Holland JP	NA	NA	

=== Gonerby ===
Gonerby
Party	Candidate	Votes	%	±%
	Thomas Newton	NA	NA	

=== Grantham no. 1 ===
Grantham no. 1
Party	Candidate	Votes	%	±%
Liberal	William Bailey	227		
Conservative	Harry Hall Garton	121		
Turnout		348		

=== Grantham no. 2 ===
Grantham no. 2
Party	Candidate	Votes	%	±%
Conservative	James Perkins Coultas	189		
Liberal	George Whitling	152		
Turnout		341		

=== Grantham no. 3 ===
Grantham no. 3
Party	Candidate	Votes	%	±%
	Arthur Hutchinson	NA	NA	

=== Grantham no. 4 ===
Grantham no. 4
Party	Candidate	Votes	%	±%
Liberal	Rev. George Benson Bowler	204		
Conservative	Arthur Gompertz Gamble	137		
Turnout		341		

=== Grantham no. 5 ===
Grantham no. 5
Party	Candidate	Votes	%	±%
	William Long Wand	NA	NA	

=== Grantham no. 6 ===
Grantham no. 6
Party	Candidate	Votes	%	±%
	John William Martin	NA	NA	

=== Grantham no. 7 ===
Grantham no. 7
Party	Candidate	Votes	%	±%
	William Brewster Harrison	NA	NA	

=== Heckington ===
Heckington
Party	Candidate	Votes	%	±%
Liberal	Daniel G. Harris	218		
Conservative	John William Davy	169		
Turnout		387		

=== Heighington ===
Heighington
Party	Candidate	Votes	%	±%
	Samuel Oglesby	NA	NA	

=== Helpringham ===
Helpringham
Party	Candidate	Votes	%	±%
	J. S. Barber	NA	NA	

=== Kyme ===
Kyme
Party	Candidate	Votes	%	±%
	The Earl of Winchelsea	NA	NA	

=== Martin ===
Martin
Party	Candidate	Votes	%	±%
	J. H. Copping	NA	NA	

=== Metheringham ===
Metheringham
Party	Candidate	Votes	%	±%
	W. D. Gilpim-Brown	NA	NA	

=== Morton ===
Morton
Party	Candidate	Votes	%	±%
	John Thomas Swift	208		
	Arthur Wellesley Dean	159		
Turnout				

=== Navenby ===
Navenby
Party	Candidate	Votes	%	±%
	William Henry Morton	NA	NA	

=== Osbournby ===
Osbournby
Party	Candidate	Votes	%	±%
	William Alfred Cragg	NA	NA	

=== Ponton ===
Ponton
Party	Candidate	Votes	%	±%
	R. C. Newton	NA	NA	

=== Rippingale ===
Rippingale
Party	Candidate	Votes	%	±%
	William Bacon	NA	NA	

=== Ropsley ===
Ropsley
Party	Candidate	Votes	%	±%
	James Cecil Rudkin	NA	NA	

=== Ruskington ===
Ruskington
Party	Candidate	Votes	%	±%
Liberal	Samuel Pattinson	256		
Conservative	John J. Bettinson	144		
Turnout		400		

=== Skellingthorpe ===
Skellingthorpe
Party	Candidate	Votes	%	±%
	George Eden Jarvis	NA	NA	

=== Sleaford East ===
Sleaford East
Party	Candidate	Votes	%	±%
	A. L. Jessop	NA	NA	

=== Sleaford West ===
Sleaford West
Party	Candidate	Votes	%	±%
Liberal	William B. Harris	243		
Conservative	John Shaw Lord	173		
Turnout		416		

=== Stamford no. 1 ===
Stamford no. 1
Party	Candidate	Votes	%	±%
	Charles Chapman	NA	NA	

=== Stamford no. 2 ===
Stamford no. 2
Party	Candidate	Votes	%	±%
	J. S. Loweth	MA	NA	

=== Stamford no. 3 ===
Stamford no. 3
Party	Candidate	Votes	%	±%
	H. Hart	NA	NA	

=== Stamford no. 4 ===
Stamford no. 4
Party	Candidate	Votes	%	±%
	Charles Handson	NA	NA	

=== Thurlby ===
Thurlby
Party	Candidate	Votes	%	±%
	G. A. Peasgood	NA	NA	

=== Uffington ===
Uffington
Party	Candidate	Votes	%	±%
	The John Trollope, 2nd Baron Kesteven	NA	NA	

=== Waddington ===
Waddington
Party	Candidate	Votes	%	±%
	Colonel R. G. Ellison JP	NA	NA	

=== Wellingore ===
Wellingore
Party	Candidate	Votes	%	±%
	Lieutenant-Colonel John Reeve	NA	NA	

=== Wilsford ===
Wilsford
Party	Candidate	Votes	%	±%
	John Albert Cole	NA	NA	

== April 1895 by-election ==
The Council met on 16 March 1895 to elect its chairman and aldermen. The only sitting councillor elected an alderman was W. B. Harrison of Grantham no. 7 division. This triggered a by-election, in which two candidates came forward. The first, Joshua Lincoln, was an alderman on Grantham Municipal Borough Council, while his opponent was Charles Basker, a magistrate and town councillor.

Grantham no. 7
Party	Candidate	Votes	%	±%
Conservative	Alderman Joshua Lincoln	232		
	Charles Basker JP	93		
Turnout		325		

- N.B. Two ballot papers were spoilt.
