= Louth and Horncastle =

UK Parliament constituency (since 1997)

Coordinates: 53.30°N 0.00°E

- County constituency for the House of Commons
- Interactive map of boundaries since 2024
- Location within the East Midlands
- County: Lincolnshire
- Electorate: 75,959 (March 2020)
- Major settlements: Louth, Horncastle, Mablethorpe, Sutton-on-Sea, Woodhall Spa

Current constituency
- Created: 1997
- Member of Parliament: Victoria Atkins (Conservative)
- Seats: One
- Created from: East Lindsey

Louth and Horncastle is a constituency (Note: A county constituency (for the purposes of election expenses and type of returning officer)) in Lincolnshire represented in the House of Commons of the UK Parliament since 2015 by Victoria Atkins, a Conservative. (Note: As with all constituencies, the constituency elects one Member of Parliament (MP) by the first past the post system of election at least every five years.)

== Constituency profile ==
Louth and Horncastle is a large rural constituency located in Lincolnshire. Its largest town is Louth, which has a population of around 18,000. Other settlements include the small market towns of Horncastle, Wragby, Coningsby, Alford and Spilsby, the spa town of Woodhall Spa, the seaside resort towns of Mablethorpe and Sutton-on-Sea and the village of Holton-le-Clay. The Lincolnshire Wolds National Landscape is located in the constituency, and like much of Lincolnshire, the constituency contains a number of former and active Royal Air Force bases. The coastal area is popular with tourists and contains numerous holiday parks, although like much of coastal England, there are high levels of deprivation here due to the decline in domestic tourism. The inland areas have average levels of wealth. House prices are lower than the rest of the East Midlands and considerably lower than the national average.

Louth and Horncastle has a large retiree population and thus residents have a very high average age. Residents have high rates of homeownership but low levels of income, education and professional employment. A high proportion of residents work in the agriculture, manufacturing and tourism sectors, and the percentage of residents claiming unemployment benefits is low. The child poverty rate is higher than the national figure. White people made up 98% of the population at the 2021 census. At the local district council, the constituency is represented by a mixture of Conservative and independent councillors with some Labour Party representation in Louth and Mablethorpe. At the county council, which held elections in 2025, all seats in the constituency were won by Reform UK. Voters in the constituency strongly supported leaving the European Union in the 2016 referendum; an estimated 68% voted in favour of Brexit compared to 52% nationwide.

== Boundaries ==
=== History of boundaries ===
From 1885 to 1983, Louth and Horncastle both existed as separate constituencies. Then in 1983, Horncastle was moved into the new seat of Gainsborough and Horncastle, while Louth was moved into the newly formed East Lindsey constituency. These boundaries remained the same until 1997, when the current Louth and Horncastle constituency was formed.

=== 1997–2010 ===
The District of East Lindsey wards of Alford, Chapel St Leonards, Coningsby, Donington on Bain, Fotherby, Grimoldby, Halton Holegate, Hogsthorpe, Holton le Clay, Horncastle, Hundleby, Legbourne, Mablethorpe, Mareham le Fen, Marshchapel, New Leake, North Holme, North Somercotes, North Thoresby, Partney, Priory, Roughton, St James', St Margaret's, St Mary's, St Michael's, Spilsby, Sutton and Trusthorpe, Tattershall, Tetford, Tetney, Theddlethorpe St Helen, Trinity, Willoughby with Sloothby, Withern with Stain, and Woodhall Spa.

=== 2010–2024 ===
The District of East Lindsey wards of Alford, Binbrook, Chapel St Leonards, Coningsby and Tattershall, Grimoldby, Halton Holegate, Holton le Clay, Horncastle, Hundleby, Legbourne, Ludford, Mablethorpe Central, Mablethorpe East, Mablethorpe North, Mareham le Fen, Marshchapel, North Holme, North Somercotes, North Thoresby, Priory, Roughton, St James', St Margaret's, St Mary's, St Michael's, Skidbrooke with Saltfleet Haven, Spilsby, Sutton on Sea North, Sutton on Sea South, Tetford, Tetney, Trinity, Trusthorpe and Mablethorpe South, Willoughby with Sloothby, Withern with Stain, and Woodhall Spa.

=== Current ===
Further to the 2023 review of Westminster constituencies, which came into effect for the 2024 general election, the composition of the constituency is as follows (as they existed on 1 December 2020):

- The District of East Lindsey wards of: Alford; Binbrook; Coningsby & Mareham; Fulstow; Grimoldby; Hagworthingham; Halton Holegate; Holton-le-Clay & North Thoresby; Horncastle; Legbourne; Mablethorpe; Marshchapel & Somercotes; North Holme; Priory & St. James’; Roughton; St. Margaret’s; St. Mary’s; St. Michael’s; Spilsby; Sutton on Sea; Tetford & Donington; Tetney; Trinity; Withern & Theddlethorpe; Woodhall Spa; Wragby.

The two wards of Chapel St Leonards and Willoughby with Sloothby were transferred to Boston and Skegness, whilst the previously orphaned ward of Wragby was added from Gainsborough.

== History ==
The seat was created in 1997. Conservatives have been dominant in the area for decades, the closest result was in 1997, when a Labour Party candidate came the closest of any opponents to being elected.

== Members of Parliament ==
The MP for this seat is Victoria Atkins. She succeeded Peter Tapsell at the 2015 general election. He previously represented the predecessor seats of East Lindsey and Horncastle from 1966 to 1997, and before that represented Nottingham West from 1959 to 1964 before being defeated by Labour. Prior to standing down, he was the longest-serving Conservative MP, albeit with the break in service, and from 2001, he was the only MP of any party first elected in the 1950s. Following the retirement of Alan Williams, Tapsell became, on his re-election in 2010, Father of the House. He was succeeded in the honorific position in 2015 by Gerald Kaufman.

Before 1997, see East Lindsey

Election	Member	Party
1997	Sir Peter Tapsell	Conservative
2015	Victoria Atkins	Conservative

== Elections ==
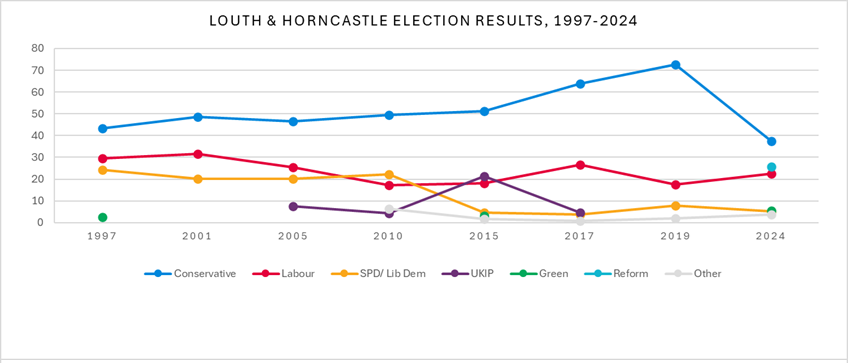
Louth & Horncastle election results 1997–2024

=== Elections in the 2020s ===
General election 2024: Louth and Horncastle
Party	Candidate	Votes	%	±%
Conservative	Victoria Atkins	17,441	37.5	−35.0
Reform	Sean Matthews	11,935	25.7	New
Labour	Jonathan Slater	10,475	22.5	+4.8
Green	Robert Watson	2,504	5.4	New
Liberal Democrats	Ross Pepper	2,364	5.1	−2.7
Independent	Paul Hugill	1,359	2.9	New
Monster Raving Loony	Iconic Arty-Pole	309	0.7	−1.3
SDP	Marcus Moorehouse	92	0.2	New
Majority		5,506	11.8	−43.4
Turnout		46,479	60.6	−4.9
Registered electors		76,882		
Conservative hold		Swing		

=== Elections in the 2010s ===
General election 2019: Louth and Horncastle
Party	Candidate	Votes	%	±%
Conservative	Victoria Atkins	38,021	72.7	+8.8
Labour	Ellie Green	9,153	17.5	−9.2
Liberal Democrats	Ross Pepper	4,114	7.9	+4.1
Monster Raving Loony	The Iconic Arty-Pole	1,044	2.0	+1.1
Majority		28,868	55.2	+18.0
Turnout		52,332	65.5	−3.7
Conservative hold		Swing	+8.95	

General election 2017: Louth and Horncastle
Party	Candidate	Votes	%	±%
Conservative	Victoria Atkins	33,733	63.9	+12.7
Labour	Julie Speed	14,092	26.7	+8.7
UKIP	Jonathan Noble	2,460	4.7	−16.7
Liberal Democrats	Lisa Gabriel	1,990	3.8	−0.7
Monster Raving Loony	The Iconic Arty Pole	496	0.9	+0.4
Majority		19,641	37.2	+7.4
Turnout		52,771	69.2	+2.0
Conservative hold		Swing	+2.0	

General election 2015: Louth and Horncastle
Party	Candidate	Votes	%	±%
Conservative	Victoria Atkins	25,755	51.2	+1.6
UKIP	Colin Mair	10,778	21.4	+17.1
Labour	Matthew Brown	9,077	18.0	+0.7
Liberal Democrats	Lisa Gabriel	2,255	4.5	−17.7
Green	Romy Rayner	1,549	3.1	New
Lincolnshire Independent	Daniel Simpson	659	1.3	+0.2
Monster Raving Loony	Peter Hill	263	0.5	New
Majority		14,977	29.8	+2.4
Turnout		50,336	67.23	+2.2
Conservative hold		Swing	−7.8	

General election 2010: Louth and Horncastle
Party	Candidate	Votes	%	±%
Conservative	Peter Tapsell	25,065	49.6	+3.2
Liberal Democrats	Fiona Martin	11,194	22.2	+1.6
Labour	Patrick Mountain	8,760	17.3	−8.0
BNP	Julia Green	2,199	4.4	New
UKIP	Pat Nurse	2,183	4.3	−3.4
Lincolnshire Independent	Daniel Simpson	576	1.1	New
English Democrat	Colin Mair	517	1.0	New
Majority		13,871	27.4	+5.3
Turnout		50,494	65.0	+2.8
Conservative hold		Swing	+0.8	

=== Elections in the 2000s ===
General election 2005: Louth and Horncastle
Party	Candidate	Votes	%	±%
Conservative	Peter Tapsell	21,744	46.6	−1.9
Labour	Frank Hodgkiss	11,848	25.4	−6.1
Liberal Democrats	Fiona Martin	9,480	20.3	+0.2
UKIP	Christopher Pain	3,611	7.7	New
Majority		9,896	21.2	+4.2
Turnout		46,683	62.0	−0.1
Conservative hold		Swing	+2.1	

General election 2001: Louth and Horncastle
Party	Candidate	Votes	%	±%
Conservative	Peter Tapsell	21,543	48.5	+5.1
Labour	David Bolland	13,989	31.5	+1.9
Liberal Democrats	Fiona Martin	8,928	20.1	−4.3
Majority		7,554	17.0	+3.2
Turnout		44,460	62.1	−10.3
Conservative hold		Swing	+1.6	

=== Elections in the 1990s ===
General election 1997: Louth and Horncastle
Party	Candidate	Votes	%	±%
Conservative	Peter Tapsell	21,699	43.4	
Labour	John Hough	14,799	29.6	
Liberal Democrats	Fiona Martin	12,207	24.4	
Green	Rosemary Robinson	1,248	2.5	
Majority		6,900	13.8	
Turnout		49,953	72.6	
Conservative win (new seat)				

== See also ==
- Louth constituency (1885–1983)
- Parliamentary constituencies in Lincolnshire

== Notes ==
Parliament of the United Kingdom
Preceded by Swansea West	Constituency represented by the father of the House; 2010–2015	Succeeded by Manchester Gorton
