= John Fane, 11th Earl of Westmorland =

British Army general

General The Right Honourable The Earl of Westmorland GCB GCH PC DL
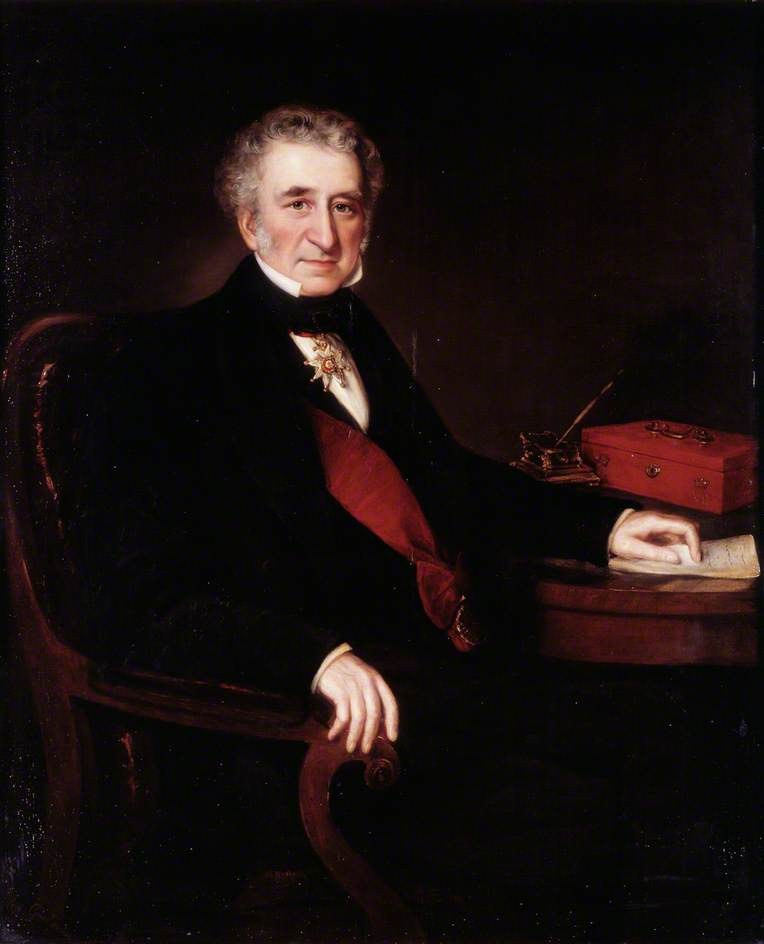
- Portrait by Julia Goodman, c. 1855 (Royal Academy of Music)

Member of the British Parliament for Lyme Regis
- In office 1806–1816 Serving with Henry Fane
- Preceded by: Hon. Thomas Fane; Henry Fane
- Succeeded by: Henry Fane; John Thomas Fane

Envoy Extraordinary and Minister Plenipotentiary to Tuscany
- In office 1814–1830
- Preceded by: Hon. William Wyndham
- Succeeded by: Sir George Seymour (as Resident)

Envoy Extraordinary and Minister Plenipotentiary to Prussia
- In office 1841–1851
- Preceded by: Lord George Russell
- Succeeded by: The Lord Bloomfield

British Ambassador to the Austria Empire
- In office 1851–1855
- Preceded by: The Viscount Ponsonby
- Succeeded by: Sir George Hamilton Seymour

Personal details
- Born: 2 February 1784 Piccadilly, London, England
- Died: 16 October 1859 (aged 75)
- Spouse: Priscilla Anne Pole-Wellesley
- Children: 6, including: Lady Rose Weigall; Francis Fane, 12th Earl of Westmorland; Hon. Julian Fane
- Parents: John Fane, 10th Earl of Westmorland (father); Sarah Child (mother)

John Fane, 11th Earl of Westmorland, GCB, GCH, PC, DL (3 February 1784 – 16 October 1859), styled Lord Burghersh until 1841, was a British soldier, politician, diplomat, composer and musician.

== Background ==
Styled Lord Burghersh from birth, he was born at Sackville Street, Piccadilly, London, the son of John Fane, 10th Earl of Westmorland, by his wife Sarah Child, daughter and heiress of the wealthy banker Sir Robert Child, builder of Osterley Park. His sister was the social hostess Sarah Villiers, Countess of Jersey, and his uncle was William Lowther, 1st Earl of Lonsdale, a Tory magnate from northern England. He was educated at Cheam School and then at Harrow from 1797 to 1799. Burghersh was admitted to Trinity College, Cambridge on 28 January 1802 and received an M.A. in 1808.

He succeeded his father in the earldom in 1841.

== Military career ==
On 9 May 1803, Burghersh was appointed a deputy lieutenant of Northamptonshire, and after the breakdown of the Peace of Amiens, he was commissioned a lieutenant in the Northampton Militia on 30 June 1803. He entered the regular army as an ensign in the 11th Foot, without purchase, on 24 December 1803. On 5 January 1804 he transferred to the 7th Foot as a lieutenant and on 3 May 1805 he transferred to the 23rd Foot as a captain. He exchanged on 1 November to the 3rd Dragoon Guards, and served as aide-de-camp to Sir George Don when the latter led reinforcements to Hanover.

As early as 1802, his uncle Lord Lonsdale had contemplated putting Burghersh into Parliament for Londsdale's pocket borough of Cockermouth when Burghersh came of age; in fact, his uncle Thomas stepped down and Burghersh was returned for the Fane constituency of Lyme Regis at the ensuing by-election on 16 March 1806. Three days later he joined Brooks's Club, traditionally a resort of Whigs and particularly Foxite, but on 30 April 1806 voted with the Pitt administration (in which his father was Lord Privy Seal) against the repeal of the Additional Forces Acts 1803. Shortly thereafter, he was sent abroad, serving as assistant adjutant general to the forces in Sicily and Egypt from 1806 to 1807.

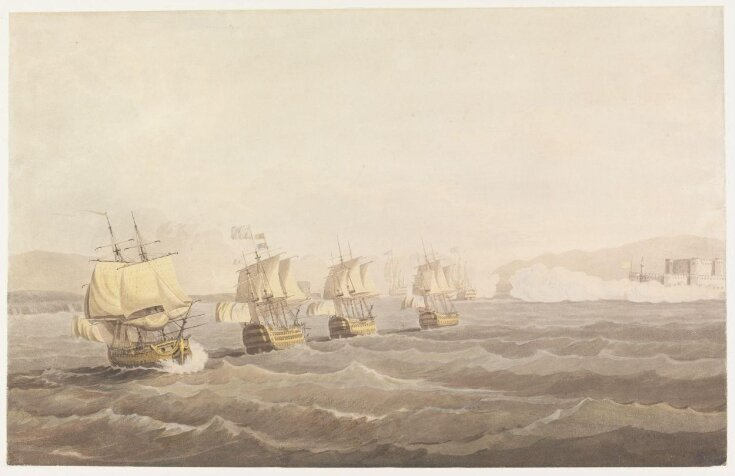
The Passage of Admiral Duckworth's Fleet in 1806-07 through the Dardanelles, painted by the Fleet's surgeon F.B. Spilsbury, kept by Fane as a souvenir.

He was with Admiral Duckworth's fleet during the Dardanelles Operation and then took part in the Alexandria expedition of 1807.

Burghersh was a supporter of the second Portland Ministry, in which his father was again Lord Privy Seal, but without particular activity in Parliament, appearing once in the debate on the price of wheat on 3 June 1808. He joined the army in Portugal led by Sir Arthur Wellesley in that year, and fought at Roliça and Vimiero in August.

On 6 May 1809, he was gazetted major in the 2nd West India Regiment in place of Thomas McMahon, sent to Lord Beresford's staff in Portugal, and lieutenant colonel on 9 May when he was himself sent to Portugal, This exceedingly rapid promotion, over the heads of many senior officers, drew the attention of William Shipley, member for Flint and recently retired as a lieutenant colonel. He moved that Burghersh's promotion was in violation of Army regulations, and the resolution was carried by the House of Commons. Lord Westmorland was compelled to ask the King not to sign Burghersh's commissions, and they were accordingly cancelled. In July, Burghersh was actively engaged at the Battle of Talavera. He soon after replied to a letter of his father's on his abortive promotion in May, telling him that "the military is a profession which I most sincerely love," but expressing his frustration at not occupying a situation more equal to his education and qualities. He served with the 3rd Dragoon Guards in their campaign in Portugal in 1810.

On 16 February 1811, he purchased a majority in the 83rd Foot, then transferred to the half-pay of the 91st Foot on 21 March. On 10 December 1811 he exchanged back into the 7th Foot and later the same year purchased a lieutenant-colonelcy in the 63rd Foot. On 4 June 1814, he was appointed an extra aide-de-camp to the Prince Regent and promoted to colonel in the Army. He was an extra aide-de-camp to the Duke of Wellington (his wife's uncle) and fought at Talavera and Busaco during the Peninsular War.

On 4 June 1815, Burghersh was appointed a CB. He was promoted major general on 27 May 1825. Made a KCB on 25 February 1838, he was promoted lieutenant general on 28 June 1838 and general in 1854 and was appointed Colonel of the 56th Foot in 1842.

== Political and diplomatic career ==
Lord Westmorland sat as a Member of Parliament (MP) for Lyme Regis between 1806 and 1816. He served as Minister to Tuscany between 1814 and 1830, as Envoy Extraordinary and Minister Plenipotentiary to Prussia between 1841 and 1851 and as Ambassador to the Austrian Empire between 1851 and 1855. In Vienna, he was one of the British representatives at the congress of 1855.

During the Revolutions of 1820 he was accused by the Austrian Government of actively supporting the Revolution in Naples, and was urged by his own Government to show more discretion. Westmorland defended his conduct by arguing that while he was "no Jacobin" and had no sympathy with the revolutionaries, he was concerned that the Austrians would put down the revolution with such brutality that further political disturbance was inevitable.

He was appointed a Companion of the Order of the Bath in 1815, a Knight Grand Cross of the Royal Guelphic Order (KCH) in 1817, a Knight Commander of the Order of the Bath (KCB) in 1838 and a Knight Grand Cross of the Order of the Bath (GCB) in 1846 and was sworn of the Privy Council in 1822.

== Musician ==
Lord Westmorland was also a composer and a founder of the Royal Academy of Music. He was reportedly a music lover who devoted most of his leisure hours to the study of music, was a violinist and a prolific composer. In Florence, he met Giacomo Meyerbeer, who was also a friend in Berlin. During his time in Berlin, he got to know Felix Mendelssohn and Gaspare Spontini. There are also sources that he met Carl Maria von Weber during his time in London.

He also had a close friendship with the star violinist Niccolò Paganini. They had met in Florence in 1818 when Fane served as British Ambassador to Florence. He helped promote Paganini’s career among the British aristocracy. He encouraged Paganini to perform in Britain and used his diplomatic and social influence to facilitate the violinist’s highly successful and much anticipated London debut in 1831. Fane remained one of Paganini’s most prominent English patrons, and his association played a significant role in introducing Paganini’s virtuosity to British audiences.

Among his compositions are six operas that were composed and privately performed during his duty as Envoy Extraordinary and Minister Plenipotentiary in Florence:

- Bajazet (1821)
- Fedra (1824)
- L'Eroe di Lancastro (1827)
- Il Torneo (1828)
- Lo Scompiglio Teatrale (1829)
- L'assedio di Belgrado (1830). This opera was also performed in London under the title Catherine or the Austrian Captive.

== Family ==
Lord Westmorland married Priscilla Anne Pole-Wellesley, daughter of the Honourable William Wellesley-Pole, later first Baron Maryborough and third Earl of Mornington and Katherine Elizabeth Forbes, on 26 June 1811. They had seven children:

- Lady Rose Sophia Mary Fane who married Henry Weigall and whose sons included the cricketer Gerry Weigall and the diplomat Archibald Weigall
- Hon. John Arthur Fane (12 February 1816 – 29 August 1816)
- George Augustus Frederick John Fane, Lord Burghersh (18 June 1819 – 29 April 1848)
- Maria Louisa Priscilla Fane (24 May 1822 - 25 March 1837)
- Ernest Fitzroy Neville Fane, Lord Burghersh (7 January 1824 – 22 June 1851)
- Francis Fane, 12th Earl of Westmorland (1825–1891)
- Hon. Julian Henry Charles Fane (10 October 1827 – 19 April 1870)

He died in October 1859, aged 75, and was succeeded in the earldom by his fourth but eldest surviving son, Francis. Lord Westmorland's fifth and youngest son Julian Fane was a poet and diplomat. The Countess of Westmorland died in February 1879.

== Arms ==
Coat of arms of John Fane, 11th Earl of Westmorland
Crest Out of a ducal coronet Or, a bull's head Argent pied Sable, armed of the first, charged on the neck with a rose Gules barbed and seeded Proper. Escutcheon Azure three dexter gauntlets backs affrontée Or. Supporters Dexter: a griffin per fesse Argent and Or, gorged with a plain collar and lined Sable; Sinister: a bull Argent pied Sable collared and lined Or, at the end of the line a ring and three staples of the last. Motto "NE VILE FANO" (Disgrace not the altar)

== See also ==
- Internationalization of the Danube River

Parliament of the United Kingdom
Preceded by Hon. Thomas Fane; Henry Fane	Member of Parliament for Lyme Regis; 1806–1816; With: Henry Fane	Succeeded by Henry Fane; John Thomas Fane
Diplomatic posts
Preceded by Hon. William Wyndham	Envoy Extraordinary and Minister Plenipotentiary to Tuscany; 1814–1830	Succeeded by Sir George Seymour (as Resident)
Preceded by Lord George Russell	Envoy Extraordinary and Minister Plenipotentiary to Prussia; 1841–1851	Succeeded by The Lord Bloomfield
Preceded by The Viscount Ponsonby	Ambassador to the Austria Empire; 1851–1855	Succeeded by Sir George Hamilton Seymour
Military offices
Preceded by Sir Hudson Lowe	Colonel of the 56th (West Essex) Regiment of Foot; 1842–1859	Succeeded by John Home Home
Peerage of England
Preceded by John Fane	Earl of Westmorland; 1841–1859	Succeeded by Francis Fane
