= 1911 Horncastle by-election =

By-election in the United Kingdom

The 1911 Horncastle by-election was a UK parliamentary by-election held on 16 February 1911 in the constituency of Horncastle in Lincolnshire. It was triggered upon the succession to the peerage of the sitting Member of Parliament, Gilbert Heathcote-Drummond-Willoughby, and was won by Archibald Weigall of the Conservative Party.

== Vacancy ==
Lord Willoughby, who had held the seat since 1895, succeeded to the peerage on the death of his father, Lord Ancaster. The by-election was called for 16 February 1911.

== Result last time ==
General election December 1910: Electorate 10,327
Party	Candidate	Votes	%	±%
Conservative	Gilbert Heathcote-Drummond-Willoughby	4,705	52.9	−1.7
Liberal	Frederick Linfield	4,181	47.1	+1.7
Majority		524	5.8	−3.4
Turnout		8,886	86.0	−4.0
Conservative hold		Swing	-1.6	

== Candidates ==
The new Conservative candidate Captain Archibald Weigall, had fought the nearby seat of Gainsborough at the December 1910 general election. Frederick Linfield was formally re-adopted as Liberal candidate on 5 January 1911.

== Result ==
Given the Unionist hold on the seat in recent times and an analysis of the past results and new voters on the roll enabled the correspondent of The Times newspaper to forecast correctly that the Unionists would hold the seat. However, there was a swing to the Liberals that nearly resulted in a gain.

Horncastle by-election, 1911: Horncastle Electorate 10,8047
Party	Candidate	Votes	%	±%
Conservative	Archibald Weigall	4,955	50.5	−2.4
Liberal	Frederick Linfield	4,848	49.5	+2.4
Majority		107	1.0	−4.8
Turnout		9,803	90.7	+4.7
Conservative hold		Swing	-2.4	

== Aftermath ==
Weigall was re-elected in 1918 before taking up an appointment as Governor of South Australia. Linfield did not contest the 1918 elections but was successful in 1922 at Mid Bedfordshire.

General election 1918 Electorate 23,764
Party	Candidate	Votes	%	±%
Unionist	Archibald Weigall	8,826	54.3	+3.8
Liberal	Samuel Pattinson	7,433	45.7	−3.8
Majority		1,393	8.6	+7.6
Turnout		16,259	68.2	−22.5
Unionist hold		Swing		
