= 1920 Horncastle by-election =

UK parliamentary by-election

- 25 February 1920 (Polling); 9 March 1920 (Declaration)
- Registered: 23,764
- Turnout: 77.0%
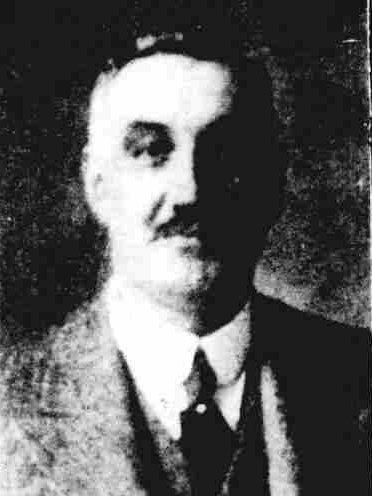
	Uni		Lab
Candidate	Stafford Hotchkin	Samuel Pattinson	William Holmes
Party	Unionist	Liberal	Labour
Alliance	Coalition
Popular vote	8,140	6,727	3,443
Percentage	44.5%	36.7%	18.8%
Swing	▼9.8%	▼9.0%	New
MP before election
William Weigall
Unionist
Subsequent MP
Stafford Hotchkin
Unionist

The 1920 Horncastle by-election was a parliamentary by-election held for the British House of Commons constituency of Horncastle in Lincolnshire on 25 February 1920. The seat had become vacant when the sitting Coalition Unionist Member of Parliament, William Weigall, who had held the seat since 1911, resigned upon being appointed Governor of South Australia.

== Candidates ==
The Unionists, as representatives of the Liberal-Conservative Coalition government of David Lloyd George had as their candidate, Stafford Hotchkin (1876-1953), a farmer, former soldier, Sheriff of Rutland and a local Justice of the Peace. The Liberals were represented by Samuel Pattinson (1870-1942), a local businessman and sometime Alderman of Lincolnshire County Council. William Holmes stood for the Labour Party.

=== The "Coupon" revisited ===
Hotchkin quickly received the endorsement of both the prime minister and the leader of the Conservative Party, Bonar Law. In his letter to Hotchkin, Lloyd George emphasised the need to resuscitate and develop British agriculture in which task he said Hotchkin as a ‘practical farmer’ would be able to help the government. Bonar-Law stressed the continuing need for parties to work together in the national interest in difficult times. In effect Hotchkin was receiving the equivalent of the government ‘coupon’ which had been issued at the 1918 general election.

== Campaign ==
=== Issues ===
==== Agriculture ====
Agriculture dominated the election in this rural constituency. Labour had hopes of picking up the votes of the agricultural workers who were members of the National Union of Agricultural Workers, but William Holmes was reported as alienating potential supporters by making speeches about revolution and bloodshed. It was expected that the Liberals would gain land workers’ votes put off by the apparent extremism of Holmes’ electioneering. While the Coalition government was losing popularity across the country, it was reported that Hotchkin was a strong local candidate who knew about farming from a practical point of view. In the post-war environment, the availability and price of food and of animal feed were also issues. All the candidates strongly supported the encouragement and development of small holdings. Hotchkin was a sometime Chairman of the Lindsey Small Holdings Committee

==== Government influence ====
A related concern was government influence over private life and business, through over-regulation and bureaucracy, as well as examples of waste and extravagance from an administration in far away London. This theme was taken up by the Liberal, who also attacked Labour for their plans for nationalisation.

== Result ==
The declaration of the poll did not take place until 9 March 1920 because of the government’s continuing to keep in force a wartime regulation delaying the announcement of election results. By this time news of H H Asquith's by-election win in Paisley had become known and this encouraged the Liberals to hope for a good result at Horncastle. In the event, however, the seat was held for the Coalition by Hotchkin with a majority of 1,413 over Pattinson, with Labour in third place. Turnout was 77.1% as opposed to 68.2% at the previous general election, which had been a straight fight between Unionist Coalitionist and Liberal candidates.

Horncastle by-election, 1920:
Party		Candidate	Votes	%	±%
C	Unionist	Stafford Hotchkin	8,140	44.5	–9.8
	Liberal	Samuel Pattinson	6,727	36.7	–9.0
	Labour	William Holmes	3,443	18.8	New
Majority			1,413	7.8	−0.8
Turnout			18,310	77.0	+8.8
Registered electors			23,764		
	Unionist hold		Swing	–0.4	
C indicates candidate endorsed by the coalition government.

== Candidates’ reaction ==
All three candidates were able to draw a positive conclusion from the result. Hotchkin was clearly gratified to have won and credited his success to a combination of popular satisfaction with the Coalition government and his status as a local man. Pattinson blamed his lack of success on the intervention of a Labour candidate, splitting the anti-coalition vote and presumably hoping Labour’s third place would discourage them from standing a candidate at future elections. Holmes said he had done well, coming late into the contest a perfect stranger to the constituency and was pleased to have established a solid Labour movement there.

Hotchkin took his seat in the House of Commons on Friday 12 March 1920. He served as MP for Horncastle until 1922 when Pattison won the seat at that year’s general election.

== Aftermath ==
The intervention of the Labour party was not viewed as a success as they chose not to contest the seat at the 1922 general election. At this election, the new Unionist MP retired and Pattinson gained the seat for the Liberals. Labour avoided running a candidate again until 1929 when their candidate took enough votes off the Liberals to allow the Unionists to win again.
