= Woodhall Spa Golf Club =

Golf club in Lincolnshire, England

Coordinates: 53.158°N 0.207°W

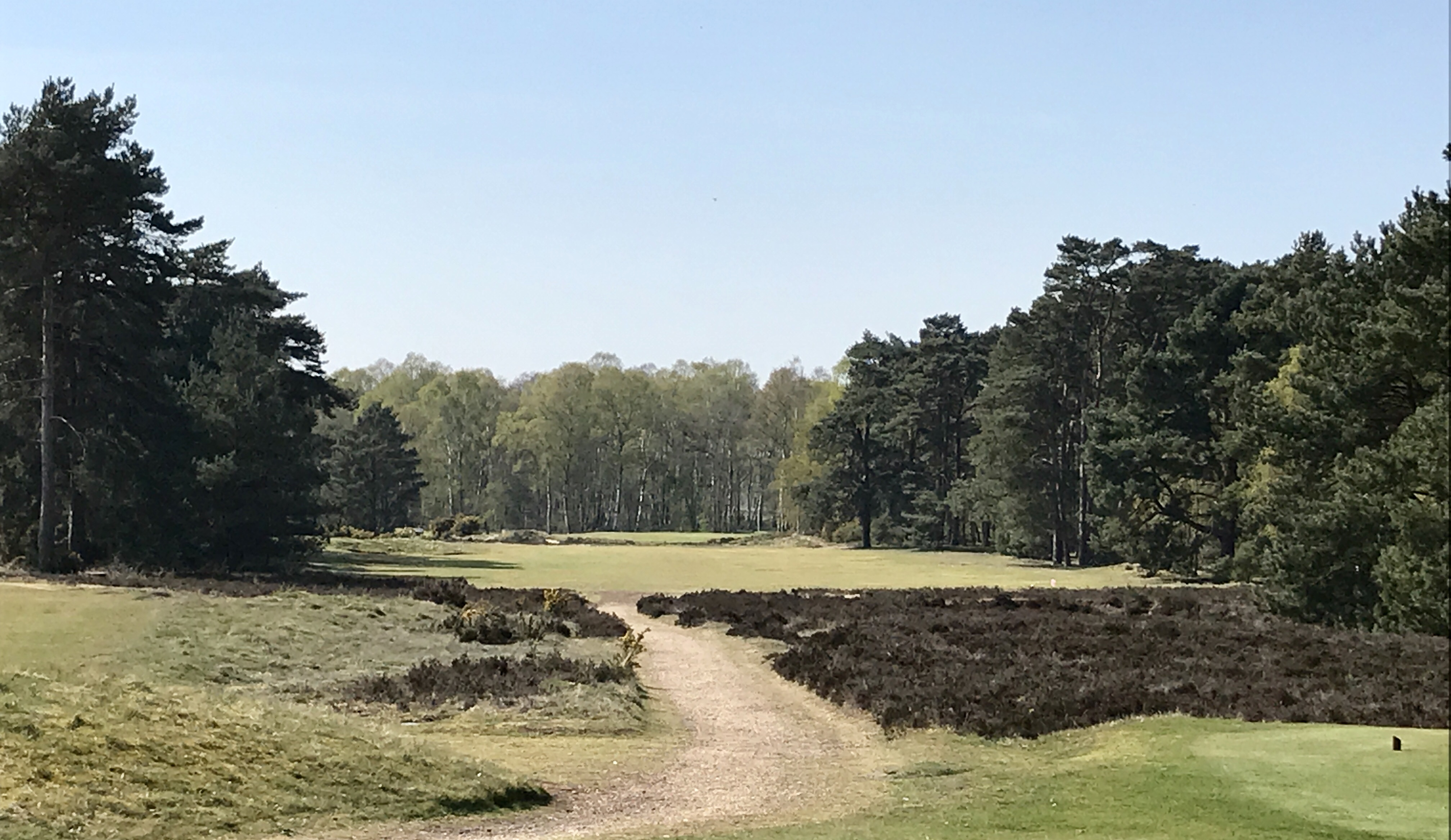
- 11th hole on the Hotchkin Course
- Interactive map of Woodhall Spa Golf Club

Club information
- Location: Woodhall Spa, Lincolnshire, England
- Website: www.woodhallspagolf.com

Woodhall Spa Golf Club is a private golf club in England that is located to the north of Woodhall Spa, Lincolnshire. The club was founded in 1891. In 1995 the club was purchased by the English Golf Union, who have since relocated their headquarters onto the site, which is now known as The National Golf Centre.

Woodhall Spa has two golf courses. The original course, now known as ‘The Hotchkin’, which opened in 1905 and was originally laid out by Harry Vardon before being redesigned by Stafford Vere Hotchkin in the 1920s, and ‘The Bracken’, designed by Donald Steel which opened in 1998. The club has hosted many prestigious amateur championships including the English Amateur and the Brabazon Trophy on several occasions.

== History ==
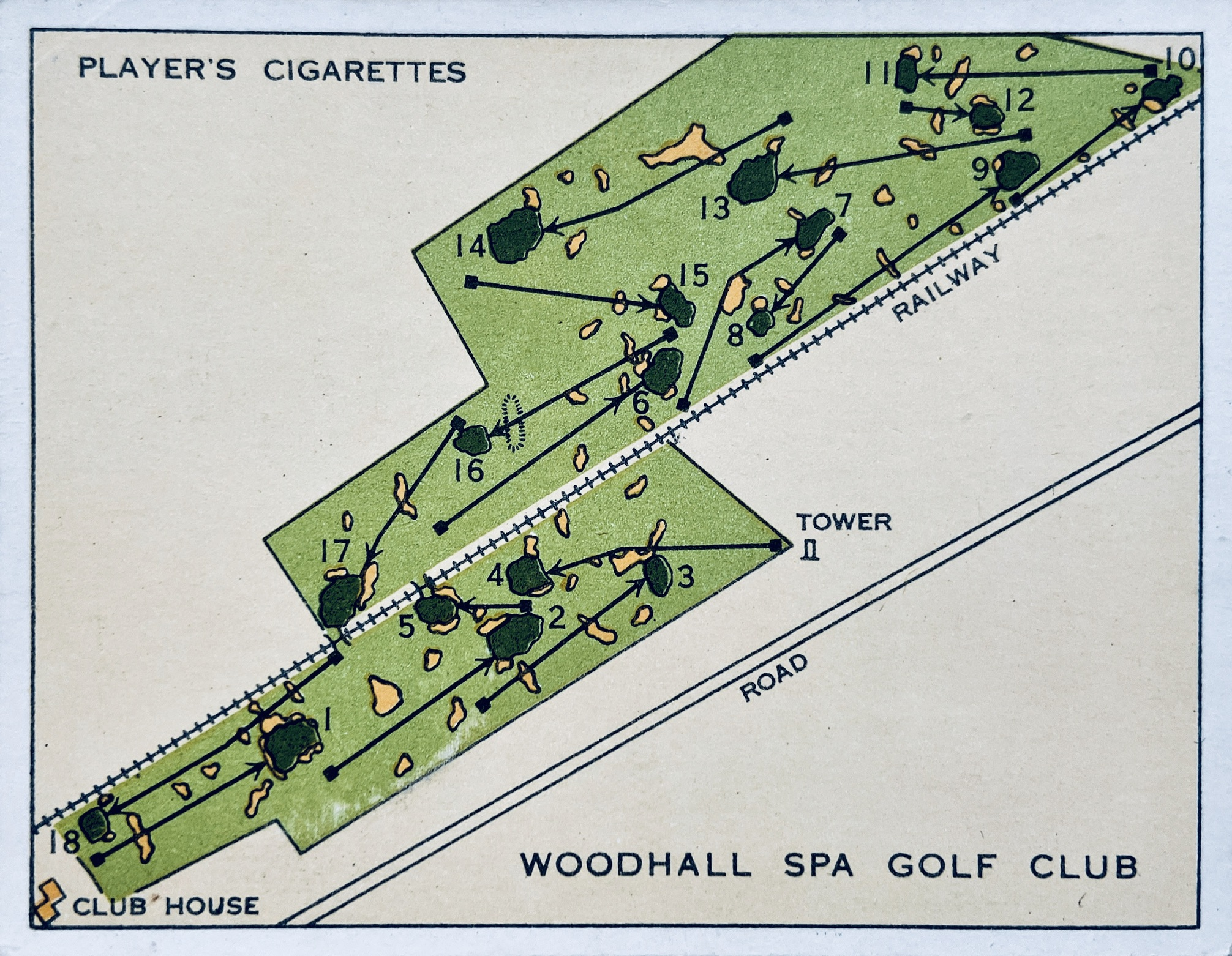
Course layout circa 1936

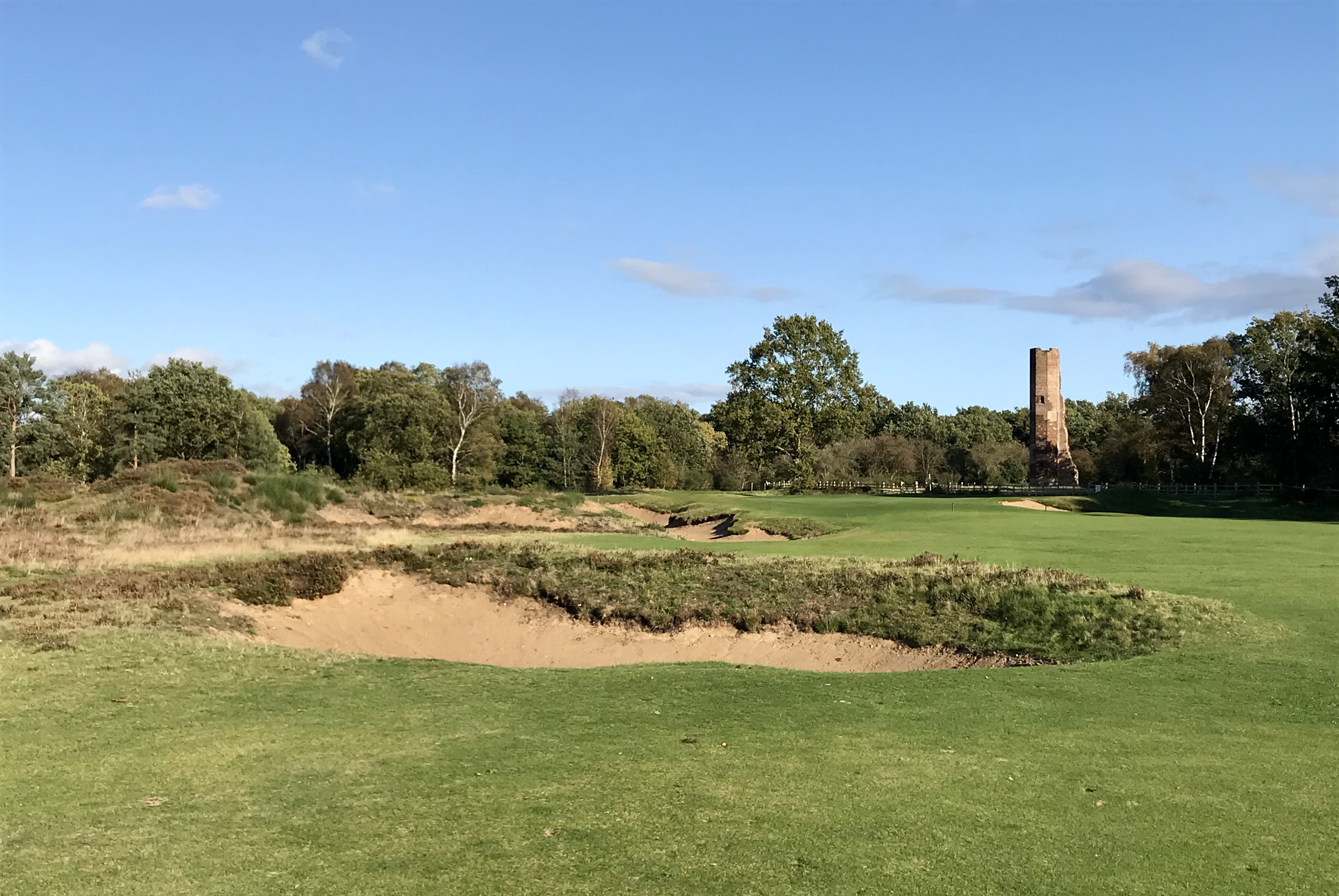
Approach to 3rd green (Hotchkin)

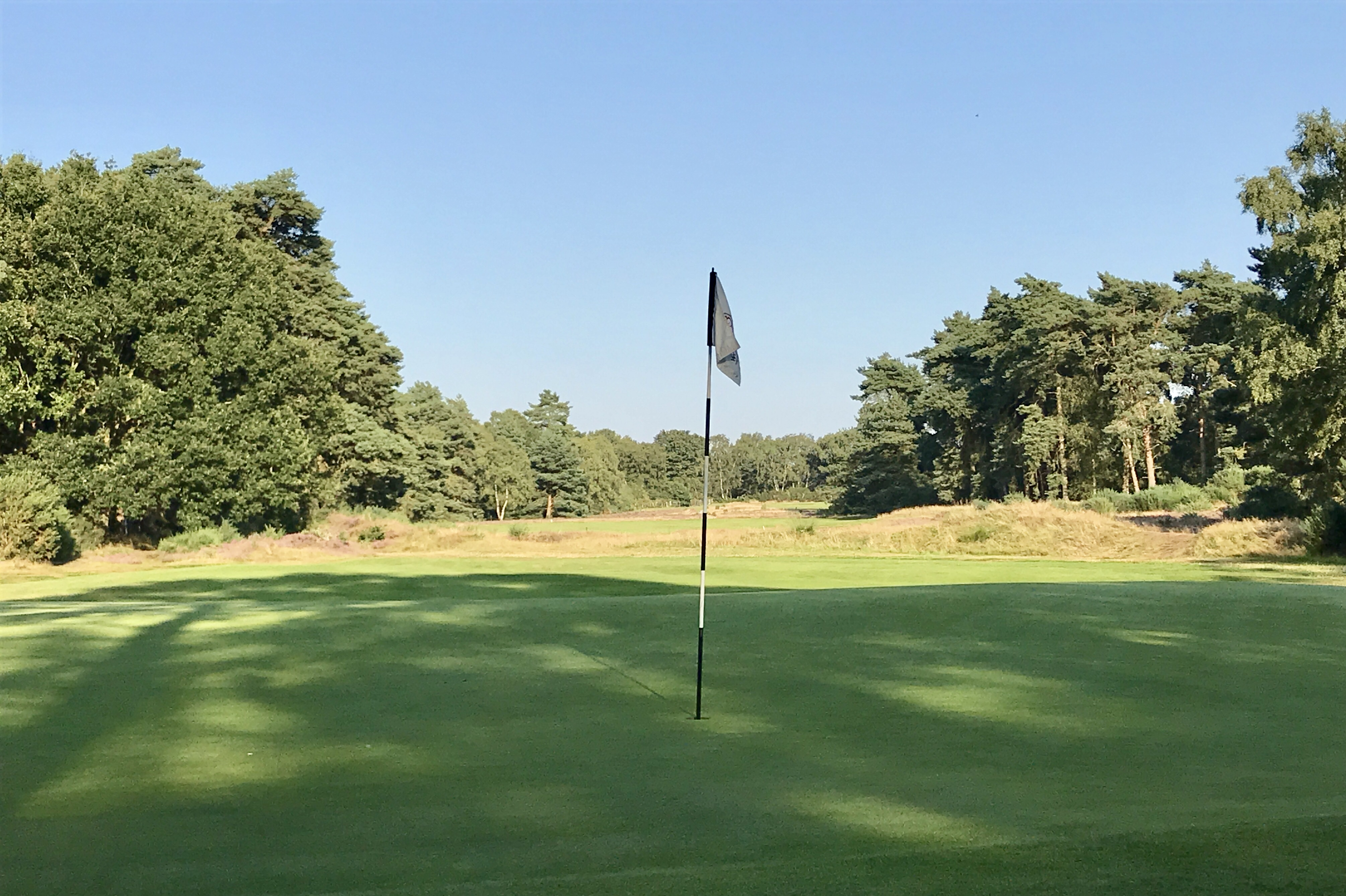
11th hole from the green (Hotchkin)

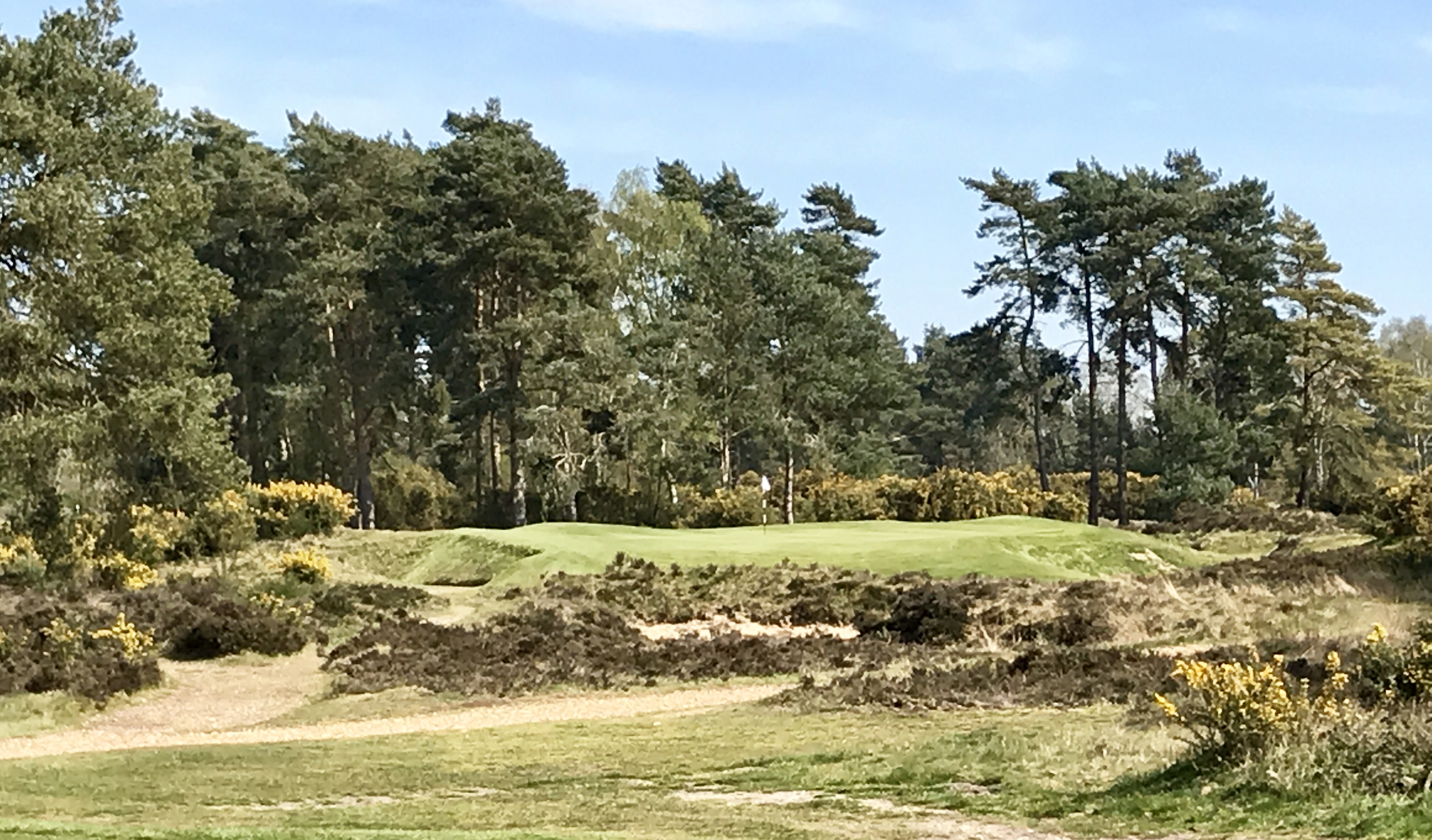
Par 3 12th hole from tee (Hotchkin)

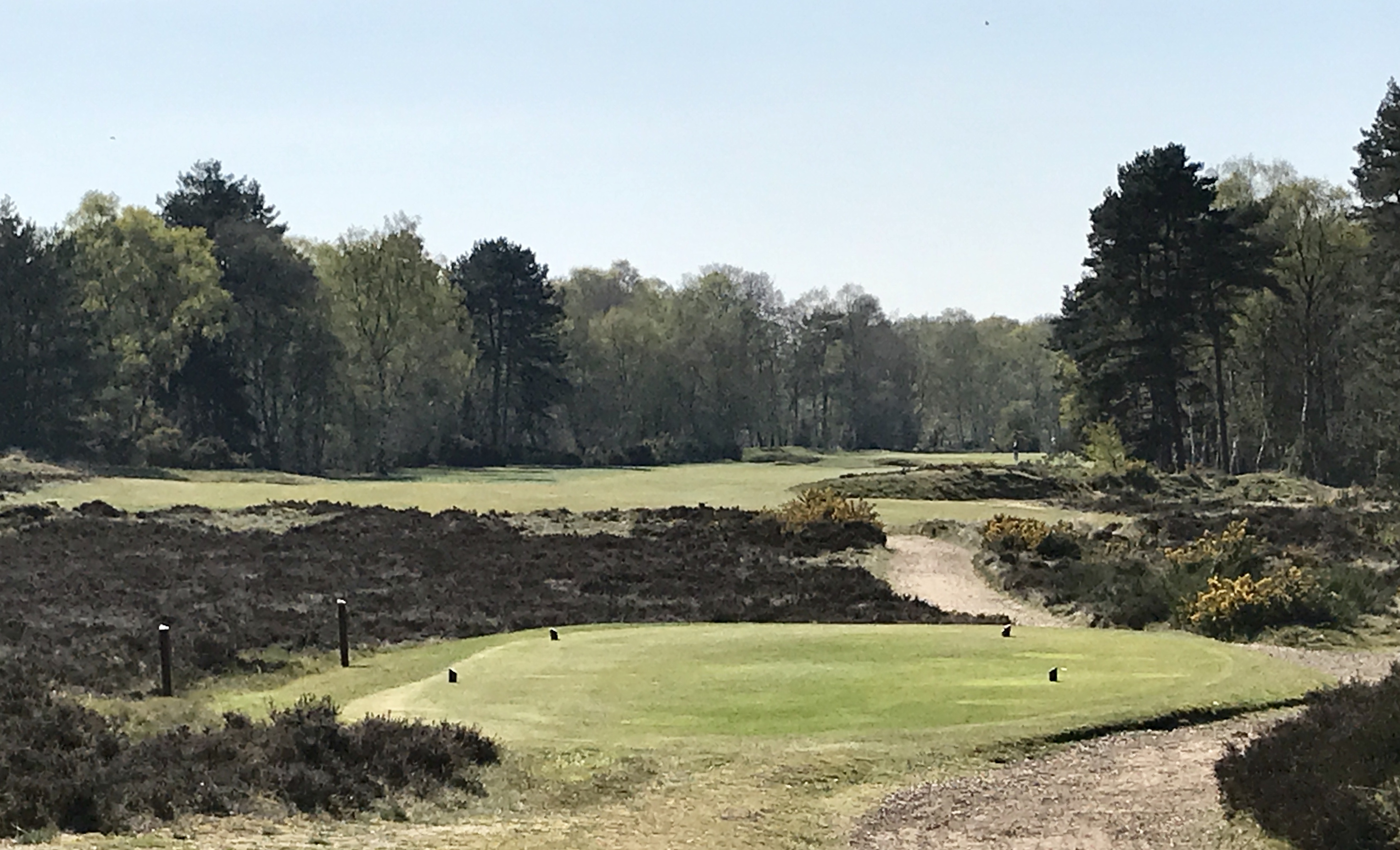
13th hole from the tee (Hotchkin)

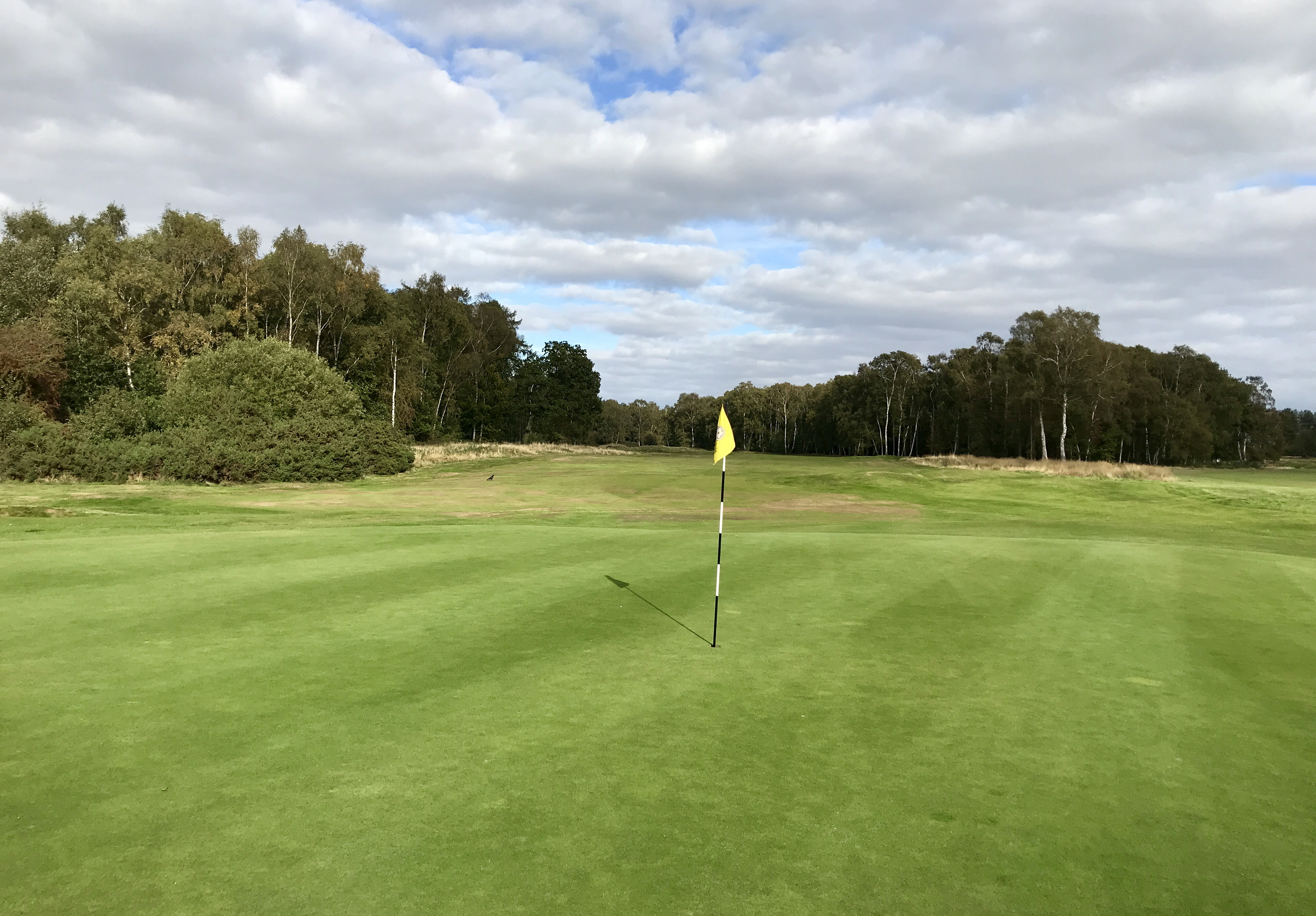
14th fairway from green (Hotchkin)

Golf started at Woodhall Spa in 1890 when a nine-hole course opened for play. The club was founded in the following year. In 1902 landowner and member, Stafford Vere Hotchkin, offered an expanse of land off Horncastle Road for the building of an 18-hole golf course. The course remains on this site today. Harry Vardon was employed to design the course. The official opening took place on 30 June 1905 and included an exhibition match between Harry Vardon, James Braid and J.H. Taylor. Harry Colt redesigned the course between 1911 and 1914.

In 1919, following a distinguished military career during the First World War, Colonel Stafford Vere Hotchkin MC returned and took over the running of the club. He was an accomplished golf course architect in his own right and remodelled many of the holes during the 1920s adding seventeen new greens. Only one of the original greens was retained (the 6th) but this was approached from a different direction. The course as it stands today remains largely his original design.

Following his death in 1953 his son Neil Hotchkin continued to run the course as a close-knit private members club where professionals had to be invited to play. He was a faithful supporter of amateur golf and served as President of the English Golf Union in 1972. He resided at Womersley House, a large detached property off Horncastle Road adjacent to the third tee.

Neil Hotchkin wished to protect and secure the future of the club as a home for amateur golf. In 1995 he sold the club and course to the English Golf Union. The EGU built a second 18-hole course (‘The Bracken’) which opened for play in 1998. The original course was then renamed ‘The Hotchkin’.

== The Hotchkin Course ==
The course is set in heathland with sandy subsoil, extensive swathes of heather and mixed foliage including birch and pine. It is generally regarded as one of the finest inland golf courses in the British Isles. The Hotchkin is renowned for its well placed deep bunkers. The bunkers surrounding the greens at the fourth and twelfth holes are especially cavernous.

== Awards and Acclaim ==
The Hotchkin course is often included in rankings of the best golf courses in the world. Golf Magazine and Golf Digest both rank the Hotchkin course as one of the top 100 courses in the world. Golf Magazine ranked the Hotchkin course as 61st best in the world in its rankings for 2021–22.

Tony Jacklin's formative years were spent in Lincolnshire and although he often played the Hotchkin course, both as an amateur and professional golfer, he never managed to score better than 70. Jacklin once told his friend Tom Weiskopf that at the outset of his golfing career he had three specific ambitions: "To win the Open Championship, to win the US Open and to break 70 at Woodhall Spa". Jacklin then said "Two out of three ain't bad!"

Weiskopf went on to become a highly regarded golf course designer and later admitted he always tried to incorporate aspects of the Hotchkin course into his own designs. "Tony Jacklin took me there once and I fell in love with the place. Now when I'm designing a course I try to remember something subtle from Woodhall, the fold of the land, the bunkering – even the fact that you can always see the top of the flagstick. There’s a bit of Woodhall Spa in every course I build".

In 1972 the golfing correspondent David Davies reflected: "Give several golfers seven days to live and the opportunity to play, for the last time, seven difficult golf courses in that week, and it is fairly safe to say that Woodhall Spa would be on the list of ones who have played it. It is one of those courses that captivates instantly, and, better, improves with acquaintance. It is a course of great beauty and one of the finest tests of the game in the British Isles".

It is a favourite course of Mark James, who won the English Amateur Championship when it was held at the club in 1974.
