= John Maitland (Conservative politician) =

Conservative Party politician in the United Kingdom

Sir John Maitland

Member of Parliament for Horncastle
- In office 5 July 1945 – 10 March 1966
- Preceded by: Henry Haslam
- Succeeded by: Peter Tapsell

Personal details
- Born: John Francis Whitaker Maitland; 24 March 1903
- Died: 17 November 1977 (aged 74)
- Party: Conservative
- Spouse: Bridget Denny
- Children: William; Peter; Andrew; Sarah; Robert
- Parent(s): William Maitland; Louisa Maitland

Sir John Francis Whitaker Maitland (24 March 1903 – 17 November 1977) was a Conservative Party politician in the United Kingdom.

In the 1945 general election, he was elected as member of parliament for the safe Conservative seat of Horncastle in Lincolnshire. He held the seat until he retired from the House of Commons at the 1966 general election.

His daughter, Sally Louisa Mary Maitland, married the Conservative Member of Parliament Jock Bruce-Gardyne.

Parliament of the United Kingdom
Preceded by Henry Haslam	Member of Parliament for Horncastle; 1945–1966	Succeeded by Peter Tapsell
