= East Lindsey (constituency) =

UK Parliament constituency (1983–1997)

- Former county constituency for the House of Commons
- County: Lincolnshire

1983–1997
- Seats: One
- Created from: Horncastle and Louth
- Replaced by: Louth and Horncastle

East Lindsey was a county constituency based on the East Lindsey local government district of Lincolnshire. It returned one Member of Parliament (MP) to the House of Commons of the Parliament of the United Kingdom.

The constituency was created for the 1983 general election, and abolished for the 1997 general election.

== Boundaries ==
The District of East Lindsey wards of Alford, Burgh-le-Marsh, Chapel St Leonards, Coningsby, Fotherby, Friskney, Frithville, Grimoldby, Halton Holegate, Hogsthorpe, Holton-le-Clay, Hundleby, Ingoldmells, Legbourne, Mablethorpe, Mareham-le-Fen, Marshchapel, New Leake, North Holme, North Somercotes, North Thoresby, Partney, Priory, St Clements, St James, St Margarets, St Marys, St Michaels, Scarbrough, Seacroft, Sibsey, Spilsby, Sutton and Trusthorpe, Tattershall, Tetford, Tetney, Theddlethorpe St Helen, Trinity, Wainfleet, Willoughby with Sloothby, Winthorpe, and Withern with Stain.

The seaside resort of Skegness and the market town of Spilsby were included in the constituency.

== Members of Parliament ==
Election	Member	Party
1983	Peter Tapsell	Conservative
1997	constituency abolished	

== Elections ==
=== Elections in the 1980s ===
General election 1983: East Lindsey
Party	Candidate	Votes	%	±%
Conservative	Peter Tapsell	27,151	53.22	
Liberal	Jonathan Sellick	19,634	38.49	
Labour	Geoffrey Lowis	4,229	8.29	
Majority		7,517	14.73	
Turnout		51,014	73.18	
Conservative win (new seat)				

General election 1987: East Lindsey
Party	Candidate	Votes	%	±%
Conservative	Peter Tapsell	29,048	52.16	
Liberal	Jonathan Sellick	20,432	36.69	
Labour	Kenneth Stevenson	6,206	11.14	
Majority		8,616	15.47	
Turnout		55,686	75.22	
Conservative hold		Swing		

=== Elections in the 1990s ===
General election 1992: East Lindsey
Party	Candidate	Votes	%	±%
Conservative	Peter Tapsell	31,916	51.1	−1.1
Liberal Democrats	James Dodsworth	20,070	32.1	−4.6
Labour	David Shepherd	9,477	15.2	+4.1
Green	Rosemary Robinson	1,018	1.6	New
Majority		11,846	19.0	+3.5
Turnout		62,481	78.1	+2.9
Conservative hold		Swing	+1.7	
