= William Warner (Conservative politician) =

British politician (1867–1950)

Member of Parliament for Mid Bedfordshire
- In office 29 October 1924 – 10 May 1929
- Preceded by: Frederick Linfield
- Succeeded by: Milner Gray

Personal details
- Born: 14 March 1867
- Died: 21 March 1950 (aged 83)
- Party: Conservative

Military service
- Allegiance: United Kingdom
- Branch/service: British Army (1887–1918); Royal Air Force (1918)
- Years of service: 1887–1907; 1914–18
- Rank: Brigadier-General
- Battles/wars: First World War
- Awards: Companion of the Order of St Michael and St George; Mentioned in Despatches; Order of Saint Anna, 3rd Class (Russia); Order of Saint Stanislaus, 2rd Class (Russia)

Brigadier-General William Ward Warner, CMG (14 March 1867 – 21 March 1950) was a British Indian Army officer of the late 19th and early 20th centuries who rose to become a brigadier-general in the newly created Royal Air Force towards the end of the First World War.

In the late 19th and early 20th centuries Warner served in India. He retired from the Indian Army in 1907 but rejoined the British Army early in 1915 after the outbreak of World War I. His first post was as a staff officer in the Directorate of Military Aeronautics and in 1916 he became the Assistant Adjutant-General at the Directorate.

From 1919 to 1922 he was a member of London County Council for Fulham.

From 1924 to 1929 he was the Conservative MP for Mid Bedfordshire. In later life he was Chairman of the General Hydraulic Company.

== Sources ==
- Air of Authority – A History of RAF Organisation – Brigadier-General W W Warner

Parliament of the United Kingdom
Preceded by Frederick Linfield	Member of Parliament for Mid Bedfordshire; 1924–1929	Succeeded by Milner Gray
