= Neil Hotchkin =

English cricketer

Neil Stafford Hotchkin (4 February 1914 – 6 February 2004) was an English first-class cricketer active 1934–48 who played for Cambridge University and Middlesex. He was born and died in Woodhall Spa, Lincolnshire, where his family had developed a golf course.

== Sporting career ==
Hotchkin was educated at Eton College and played in the Eton-Harrow match in 1931, 1932 and 1933. He then went to Cambridge University and opened the batting for Cambridge University Cricket Club in the 1935 University match against Oxford. He played a handful of matches for Middlesex, the last in 1948, and some matches for the Europeans cricket team while stationed in India during World War II. In 23 first-class matches he scored 736 runs at an average of 21.02.

His father, Stafford Hotchkin, developed a golf course at the family home of Woodhall Spa Manor in 1891. Neil Hotchkin was the English Golf Union (EGU) president in 1972. He was also President of The European Golf Association from 1989 to 1991. He sold the Woodhall Spa Golf Club to the EGU in 1995. The EGU relocated the National Golf Centre to Woodhall Spa, and the main course at the club was named the Hotchkin Course.

== Military career ==
Neil Hotchkin joined the part-time Territorial Army in 1936, being commissioned as a Second lieutenant in the Lincoln Battery of 60th (North Midland) Field Regiment, Royal Artillery (RA), of which his father was at the time the Honorary Colonel. During World War II he served with the RA in the Dunkirk Evacuation, the Middle East, and in India. Then in late 1943 the 60th Field Regiment was converted to infantry and trained to join the Chindits in the Long Range Penetration (LRP) role. By now a Major, Hotchkin commanded an LRP Column formed by the 60th Field Regiment in the gruelling Naga Hills campaign in Burma during April–July 1944.
