= Samuel Pattinson =

British businessman and Liberal politician

Samuel Pattinson

Samuel Pattinson (17 December 1870 – 15 November 1942) was a British businessman and Liberal politician.

== Early life and family ==
Samuel Pattinson was born on 17 December 1870 in Ruskington, the son of a contractor and businessman, William Pattinson (d. 1906), and his wife Anne (1833–1916). His father ran the building company Messrs. Pattinson and Son alongside serving as chairman of Ruskington Urban District Council. Pattinson was educated at Abingdon House School, and Carre's Grammar School in Sleaford with his brother Robert (d. 1954), an active politician who chaired Kesteven County Council between 1934 and his death. Their eldest brother, John (d. 1939), was involved in the family business, supervising contracts in Liverpool and the south of England, before moving back to Lincolnshire; he represented Heckington and Sleaford on the County Council, became a justice of the peace and served as vice-chairman of the Sleaford Bench.

Pattinson married Betsy Sharpley Bainbridge on 14 April 1897. She was the second daughter of a draper, George Bainbridge JP, of Portland House on South Park, Lincoln, and his first wife Annie, daughter of Edward Penniston JP of Doncaster. Following his father-in-law's death in 1916, Pattinson carried on the business with several other men and later became a director.

== Career ==
The Pattinson family ran a successful builder's merchants in Sleaford, Lincolnshire, of which Samuel was a director. He was also a director of Bainbridge's Ltd in Lincoln, his wife's father's company.

== Politics ==
=== Local politics ===
Pattinson was an Alderman of Kesteven County Council on which he served as Chairman of the Finance Committee. He was also Justice of the Peace for the County.

=== Parliamentary politics ===
He first contested a Parliamentary seat at the 1918 general election when he stood as Liberal candidate in Horncastle. As a supporter of H H Asquith he was not given the government coupon which was granted to Coalition Unionist William Weigall. Pattinson tried again at Horncastle at the by-election of 1920 which was called when Weigall was appointed Governor of South Australia but he lost by 1,413 votes to the Coalition Conservative, Stafford Vere Hotchkin.

Pattinson was eventually elected to the House of Commons at the 1922 general election, beating the Conservative candidate by 1,639. He held the seat at the 1923 general election with a majority of 1,819 but he could not retain it in 1924 losing to Conservative candidate Henry Cobden Haslam, a science researcher from Cambridge University, by 1,169 votes

=== Bonar Law ===
Despite his Liberal affiliations, Pattison was obviously an admirer of Tory leader Bonar Law. In December 1922 he informed his constituents in Horncastle that Bonar Law was ‘the finest leader the House of Commons had seen for a very long time. [He]..held the House of Commons in the hollow of his hand". Pattinson said although he differed in political viewpoint from Bonar Law, he admired him greatly and believed he honestly wished to do his best for the country. By this time of course Bonar Law was prime minister having replaced David Lloyd George when his Liberal-Conservative coalition fell after the Carlton Club meeting of 19 October 1922. As an Asquithian Liberal, it is unlikely Pattinson had much regard for Lloyd George and his view of Bonar Law might have been coloured by this. By December 1922, the general election was over, so Pattison had no need to flatter Bonar Law to his constituents to try and earn Conservative votes.

Parliament of the United Kingdom
Preceded by Stafford Hotchkin	Member of Parliament for Horncastle; 1922–1924	Succeeded by Henry Haslam
