= Stafford Hotchkin =

English landowner and MP

Colonel Stafford Vere Hotchkin MC (1876 – 8 August 1953) was an English landowner, soldier, High Sheriff of Rutland and briefly a Conservative Member of Parliament.

He was the only son of Thomas John Stafford Hotchkin of The Manor House, Woodhall Spa by Mary Charlotte Edith Lucas, elder daughter of George Vere Braithwaite of Edith Weston Hall. He was educated at Shrewsbury School.

He married Dorothy Arnold in 1906. Their issue included Neil Hotchkin (1914–2004).

He served in the 21st Lancers and Leicestershire Yeomanry, but throughout the First World War he served with the Royal Horse Artillery in Palestine. He was awarded the Military Cross in the 1918 Birthday Honours.

Hotchkin developed an interest in golf course architecture and he set up his own golf course design company, Ferigna, in the late 1920s. He had provided the land for Woodhall Spa Golf Club and later redesigned the course, which now bears his name. He also designed a number of links courses in South Africa.

He narrowly won the by-election for Horncastle for the Liberal-Conservative Coalition on 25 February 1920 but lost the seat in the 1922 General Election to the Liberal Samuel Pattinson.

Parliament of the United Kingdom
| Preceded by Archibald Weigall | Member of Parliament for Horncastle; 1920–1922 | Succeeded by Samuel Pattinson |
