= Henry Haslam =

British medical researcher and politician

Henry Cobden Haslam (4 October 1870 – 7 February 1948) was a British medical researcher and Conservative Party politician.

The son of Henry Haslam, a "member" or insurance underwriter of Lloyd's of London, he was born in the north London suburb of Hampstead. He was educated at Dover College and in 1889 was admitted to Gonville and Caius College, Cambridge. He took second class in the Natural Sciences Tripos in 1892, and continued his medical training at St Thomas' Hospital in London. He was admitted to the membership of the Royal College of Surgeons in 1896 and received a Bch Cantab degree in 1897.

In 1901 he left St Thomas', having been elected to a scholarship at the Department of Pathology at Cambridge University. He conducted research and published a number of papers in scientific journals. He received a DSc from the university in 1914. He married Julie Henriette Dupont, daughter of Edward Dupont, director of the Musée d’Histoire Naturelle in Brussels, and they had two children.

Haslam subsequently abandoned his medical career, becoming an underwriter at Lloyd's like his father. He also entered politics, and at the 1924 general election he was elected as Member of Parliament (MP) for the safe Conservative seat of Horncastle in Lincolnshire. He held the seat until he retired from the House of Commons at the 1945 general election.

He died at his Cambridge home in June 1948 aged 77, and was buried in Horncastle.

Parliament of the United Kingdom
Preceded by Samuel Pattinson	Member of Parliament for Horncastle; 1924–1945	Succeeded by John Maitland
