= Lady Rose Weigall =

British philanthropist and the biographer

- Born: Hon. Rose Sophia Mary Fane; 5 September 1834; London, England
- Died: 14 February 1921 (aged 86); Ramsgate, Kent
- Occupations: Literary editor and biographer
- Spouse: Henry Weigall
- Parent(s): John Fane, 11th Earl of Westmorland; Priscilla Anne Pole-Wellesley

Lady Rose Sophia Mary Weigall (née Fane; 5 September 1834 – 14 February 1921) was a British philanthropist and the biographer of Princess Charlotte of Wales.

== Life ==
Weigall was born in London, the youngest of nine children of John Fane, Lord Burghersh (who became Earl of Westmorland in 1841) and Priscilla Anne Pole-Wellesley. Her mother's uncle was the Duke of Wellington. In 1841, Lady Rose moved to Berlin where her father was a minister. At the end of that same year, he became Earl of Westmorland upon the death of his father, and she was styled Lady Rose. She and her family were there until 1851 when they moved to Vienna where her father was the British ambassador during the Crimean War. In Vienna, she wrote to Princess Louise of Prussia, continuing a friendship that was to be a lifelong correspondence between them. She also continued her education with German and Swiss tutors.

When her father died in 1859, she moved with her mother to London. There she met William Gladstone, Palmerston and Henry Weigall. Weigall was a popular portrait painter. They married and eventually had seven children including the cricketer Gerry Weigall and Sir Archibald Weigall, who was later governor of Australia. They bought Southwood House in Ramsgate as the family home in 1880.

After her brother Julian's early death, she became co-guardian to his children, John and Ethel (future Lady Desborough) together with their maternal uncle, Henry Cowper. However, according to Lady Desborough's own diaries, she and Lady Rose were never close and Ettie herself became more attached to her maternal relatives as a result.

Her family as the Earls of Westmoreland had a country residence at Apethorpe in Northamptonshire and she took her responsibilities as part of the landowning family seriously. An article she wrote in 1869 spoke of 'Our friends in the village' which included the poor people of Apethorpe. She also had concerns in Europe, but never went abroad after her marriage. She was aware of the need to keep her mind active and she gave her time to history, correspondence and literary interests. She wrote and her ideas were published in Macmillan's Magazine. Under the encouragement of Queen Victoria she wrote a biography of Princess Charlotte who had died in childbirth. It was titled A Brief Memoir of the Princess Charlotte of Wales and she presented a copy to the Queen in August 1874.

Weigall died at Southwood House in Ramsgate. The Thanet Advertiser reported in its obituary of Weigall that she was active on the Board of Guardians of Nethercoat VAD Hospital, and that she knitted mittens and socks for soldiers who had been injured and as a result needed to have them made in different sizes and shapes. She also supported the local Cottage homes.
