= Peter Tapsell (British politician) =

British politician (1930–2018)

The Right Honourable Sir Peter Tapsell
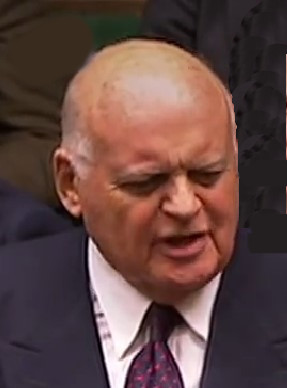
- Tapsell at Prime Minister's Questions in September 2012

Father of the House of Commons
- In office 6 May 2010 – 30 March 2015
- Speaker: John Bercow
- Preceded by: Alan Williams
- Succeeded by: Gerald Kaufman

Member of Parliament for Louth and Horncastle East Lindsey (1983–1997) Horncastle (1966–1983)
- In office 31 March 1966 – 30 March 2015
- Preceded by: John Maitland (Horncastle) & Michael Brotherton (Louth)
- Succeeded by: Victoria Atkins

Member of Parliament for Nottingham West
- In office 8 October 1959 – 25 September 1964
- Preceded by: Tom O'Brien
- Succeeded by: Michael English

Personal details
- Born: Peter Hannay Bailey Tapsell; 1 February 1930 Hove, Sussex, England
- Died: 17 August 2018 (aged 88) Roughton, Lincolnshire, England
- Party: Conservative
- Spouses: Cecilia Hawke (m. 1963; div. 1971) Gabrielle Mahieu (m. 1974)
- Children: 1
- Education: Merton College, Oxford

Military service
- Allegiance: United Kingdom
- Branch/service: British Army
- Years of service: 1948–1950
- Rank: Second lieutenant
- Unit: Royal Sussex Regiment

Sir Peter Hannay Bailey Tapsell (1 February 1930 – 17 August 2018) was a British Conservative Party politician and Member of Parliament (MP) for Louth and Horncastle. He served in the House of Commons continuously from 1966 until 2015, and was also previously an MP from 1959 to 1964. He was Father of the House between 2010 and 2015, during which time he was also the oldest sitting Member of Parliament. With a total parliamentary service of 54 years, he is one of the longest-serving MPs in British history.

== Early life and education ==
Tapsell was born in Hove, Sussex. He was educated at Tonbridge School, served in the Royal Sussex Regiment from 1948 to 1950, and continued his education at Merton College, Oxford, gaining a BA in Modern History in 1954, during which time he was also elected Librarian of the Oxford Union (a senior office). Tapsell was a member of the Oxford University Labour Club during his time at Merton.

== Political career ==
Tapsell worked as a personal assistant to Sir Anthony Eden during the 1955 general election. He contested the Wednesbury by-election in 1957, losing to the Labour Party candidate John Stonehouse. Tapsell was chairman of the Coningsby Club (a dining club for Conservative graduates, restricted at that time to graduates of Oxford and Cambridge) from 1957 until 1958.

Tapsell first entered Parliament in the 1959 general election, representing Nottingham West. After losing his seat at the 1964 general election, he was selected for Horncastle, representing the constituency from 1966 to 1983. In 1983, boundary changes moved him to East Lindsey, which he represented until 1997 when further boundary changes moved him to Louth and Horncastle. He was knighted in 1985. Tapsell was a long-time supporter of Keynesian economics, and opposed the monetarist policies of Margaret Thatcher's governments. In 1981, he voted against Sir Geoffrey Howe's Budget – becoming, as Peter Oborne noted, "the first Conservative since Harold Macmillan in the 1930s to vote against a Budget, a brave move which turned him into an internal political exile."

Tapsell was known for his forthright views and was sometimes controversial. In May 2001, he made headlines during the UK general election campaign when comparing German Chancellor Gerhard Schröder's vision of Europe to Adolf Hitler's: "We may not have studied Hitler's Mein Kampf in time but, by heaven, there is no excuse for us not studying the Schröder plan now". Tapsell was opposed to the wars in Iraq and Afghanistan, and called for Tony Blair to be impeached for misleading parliament over the invasion of Iraq. From 2005 onwards he was the only MP from any party who had been first elected in the 1950s, but the two-year gap in his parliamentary service prevented him from becoming Father of the House until Alan Williams retired in 2010. He is one of the few MPs in parliamentary history to have served over fifty years in the House of Commons.

Tapsell was strongly Eurosceptic. He was in favour of Britain leaving the EU. He felt that of all his political actions the one of which he was most proud was his opposition to the Maastricht Treaty, "because everything that has gone wrong in Britain dates from us joining the European Union. One of the reasons the House of Commons has lost its prestige is because people feel we are no longer in charge of a country. So much of the legislation that affects them is imposed by Brussels."

In November 2005, he was the only Conservative MP, and one of only two non-Labour MPs, to vote in favour of a proposal to allow police to detain terror suspects for up to 90 days without charge. During the 2006 Lebanon War, he said that Israeli action in Lebanon was "gravely reminiscent of the Nazi atrocity on the Jewish quarter of Warsaw". Guardian sketch writer Simon Hoggart frequently lavished praise on Tapsell, describing him as "the grandest of grandees" (July 2008) and that when in the Chamber, Tapsell rises "to speak, or rather to intone superbly" (January 2008).

In June 2011, Tapsell was appointed as a Privy Counsellor in the 2011 Birthday Honours, and he was sworn into the Council the following month. Tapsell was reported as being one of the Conservative MPs to have spoken critically of Party Co-Chairman Sayeeda Warsi at a meeting of the 1922 Committee, following Warsi's handling of Roger Helmer MEP's defection to UKIP. In March 2014, he announced his intention to step down from Parliament at the 2015 general election, and also gave an interview where he was highly critical of former Prime Minister Margaret Thatcher, under whom he briefly served as a spokesman on economic policy when the Conservatives were still in Opposition in the 1970s.

== Personal life ==
Tapsell married Cecilia Hawke, third daughter of the 9th Baron Hawke, in 1963. The couple had a son, James, who was born in 1966 and died in 1985. They divorced in 1971, and Tapsell subsequently married Gabrielle Mahieu in 1974. His former wife Cecilia married Tapsell's fellow Conservative politician Sir Nicholas Scott in 1979.

Tapsell lived at Roughton Hall in Roughton, Lincolnshire. He died there on 17 August 2018, aged 88.

Parliament of the United Kingdom
Preceded by Tom O'Brien	Member of Parliament for Nottingham West; 1959–1964	Succeeded by Michael English
Preceded by John Maitland	Member of Parliament for Horncastle; 1966–1983	Constituency abolished
New constituency	Member of Parliament for East Lindsey; 1983–1997	Constituency abolished
New constituency	Member of Parliament for Louth and Horncastle; 1997–2015	Succeeded by Victoria Atkins
Honorary titles
Preceded by Alan Williams	Father of the House of Commons; 2010–2015	Succeeded by Gerald Kaufman
Preceded by Ian Paisley	Oldest sitting Member of Parliament; 2010–2015	Succeeded by Gerald Kaufman
