= Horncastle (constituency) =

Parliamentary constituency in the United Kingdom, 1885–1983

- Former county constituency for the House of Commons

1885–1983
- Seats: one
- Created from: Mid Lincolnshire
- Replaced by: East Lindsey & Gainsborough and Horncastle

Horncastle was a county constituency in Lincolnshire which returned one Member of Parliament (MP) to the House of Commons of the Parliament of the United Kingdom. MPs were elected by the first past the post system of voting.

The constituency was created by the Redistribution of Seats Act 1885, and first used for the 1885 general election. It was abolished for the 1983 general election.

== Boundaries ==
1885–1918: The Sessional Division of Spilsby, and parts of the Sessional Divisions of Alford and Horncastle.

1918–1950: The Urban Districts of Alford, Horncastle, Skegness, and Woodhall Spa, and the Rural Districts of Horncastle, Sibsey, and Spilsby.

1950–1983: The Urban Districts of Alford, Horncastle, Mablethorpe and Sutton, Skegness, and Woodhall Spa, and the Rural Districts of Horncastle and Spilsby.

== Members of Parliament ==
Election	Member	Party
1885	Edward Stanhope	Conservative
1894 by-election	Gilbert Heathcote-Drummond-Willoughby	Conservative
1911 by-election	Archibald Weigall	Conservative
1920 by-election	Stafford Hotchkin	Coalition Conservative
1922	Samuel Pattinson	Liberal
1924	Henry Haslam	Conservative
1945	Sir John Maitland	Conservative
1966	Peter Tapsell	Conservative
1983	constituency abolished	

== Election results ==
=== Elections in the 1880s ===
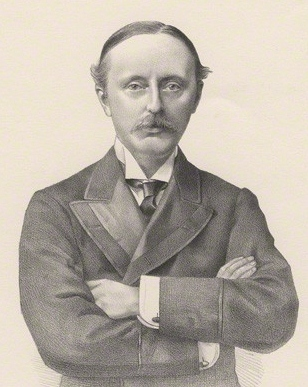
E. Stanhope

General election 1885: Horncastle
Party	Candidate	Votes	%	±%
Conservative	Edward Stanhope	4,824	54.9	
Lib-Lab	Thomas Threlfall	3,959	45.1	
Majority		865	9.8	
Turnout		8,783	88.4	
Registered electors		9,941		
Conservative win (new seat)				

General election 1886: Horncastle
Party	Candidate	Votes	%	±%
Conservative	Edward Stanhope	Unopposed		
Conservative hold				

Stanhope was appointed Secretary of State for the Colonies, requiring a by-election.

By-election, 12 Aug 1886: Horncastle
Party	Candidate	Votes	%	±%
Conservative	Edward Stanhope	Unopposed		
Conservative hold				

=== Elections in the 1890s ===
General election 1892: Horncastle
Party	Candidate	Votes	%	±%
Conservative	Edward Stanhope	4,438	54.5	N/A
Liberal	Francis Otter	3,700	45.5	New
Majority		738	9.0	N/A
Turnout		8,138	85.2	N/A
Registered electors		9,555		
Conservative hold		Swing	N/A	

Stanhope's death caused a by-election.

Lord Willoughby

1894 Horncastle by-election
Party	Candidate	Votes	%	±%
Conservative	Gilbert Heathcote-Drummond-Willoughby	4,582	55.0	+0.5
Liberal	Herbert James Torr	3,744	45.0	−0.5
Majority		838	10.0	+1.0
Turnout		8,326	87.4	+2.2
Registered electors		9,528		
Conservative hold		Swing	+0.5	

General election 1895: Horncastle
Party	Candidate	Votes	%	±%
Conservative	Gilbert Heathcote-Drummond-Willoughby	4,563	60.2	+5.7
Lib-Lab	John Bruce Wallace	3,022	39.8	−5.7
Majority		1,541	20.4	+11.4
Turnout		7,585	65.2	−20.0
Registered electors		11,642		
Conservative hold		Swing	+5.7	

=== Elections in the 1900s ===
General election 1900: Horncastle
Party	Candidate	Votes	%	±%
Conservative	Gilbert Heathcote-Drummond-Willoughby	4,302	59.2	−1.0
Liberal	T Wallis	2,962	40.8	+1.0
Majority		1,340	18.4	−2.0
Turnout		7,264	76.6	+11.4
Registered electors		9,488		
Conservative hold		Swing	−1.0	

General election 1906: Horncastle
Party	Candidate	Votes	%	±%
Conservative	Gilbert Heathcote-Drummond-Willoughby	4,250	50.9	−8.3
Liberal	A Adams	4,100	49.1	+8.3
Majority		150	1.8	−16.6
Turnout		8,350	86.6	+10.0
Registered electors		9,637		
Conservative hold		Swing	−8.3	

=== Elections in the 1910s ===
General election January 1910: Horncastle
Party	Candidate	Votes	%	±%
Conservative	Gilbert Heathcote-Drummond-Willoughby	5,162	54.6	+3.7
Liberal	Charles Conybeare	4,292	45.4	−3.7
Majority		870	9.2	+7.4
Turnout		9,454	90.0	+3.4
Conservative hold		Swing	+3.7	

General election December 1910: Horncastle
Party	Candidate	Votes	%	±%
Conservative	Gilbert Heathcote-Drummond-Willoughby	4,705	52.9	−1.7
Liberal	Frederick Linfield	4,181	47.1	+1.7
Majority		524	5.8	−3.4
Turnout		8,886	86.0	−4.0
Conservative hold		Swing	−1.6	

1911 Horncastle by-election
Party	Candidate	Votes	%	±%
Conservative	Archibald Weigall	4,955	50.5	−2.4
Liberal	Frederick Linfield	4,848	49.5	+2.4
Majority		107	1.0	−4.8
Turnout		9,803	90.7	+4.7
Conservative hold		Swing	−2.4	

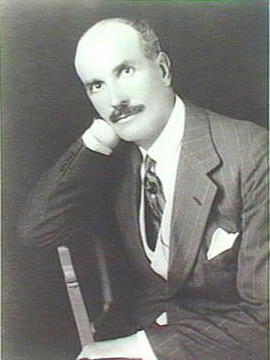
William Weigall

General election 1918: Horncastle
Party		Candidate	Votes	%	±%
C	Unionist	Archibald Weigall	8,826	54.3	+1.4
	Liberal	Samuel Pattinson	7,433	45.7	−1.4
Majority			1,393	8.6	+2.8
Turnout			16,259	68.2	−17.8
Registered electors			23,854		
	Unionist hold		Swing	+1.4	
C indicates candidate endorsed by the coalition government.

=== Elections in the 1920s ===
1920 Horncastle by-election
Party		Candidate	Votes	%	±%
C	Unionist	Stafford Hotchkin	8,140	44.5	−9.8
	Liberal	Samuel Pattinson	6,727	36.7	−9.0
	Labour	William Holmes	3,443	18.8	New
Majority			1,413	7.8	−0.8
Turnout			18,310	77.0	+8.8
Registered electors			23,764		
	Unionist hold		Swing	−0.4	
C indicates candidate endorsed by the coalition government.

General election 1922: Horncastle
Party	Candidate	Votes	%	±%
Liberal	Samuel Pattinson	10,797	54.1	+8.4
Unionist	Maurice Roche	9,158	45.9	−8.4
Majority		1,639	8.2	N/A
Turnout		19,955	81.5	+13.3
Registered electors		24,485		
Liberal gain from Unionist		Swing	+8.4	

General election 1923: Horncastle
Party	Candidate	Votes	%	±%
Liberal	Samuel Pattinson	10,954	54.5	+0.4
Unionist	John Du Cane	9,135	45.5	−0.4
Majority		1,819	9.0	+0.8
Turnout		20,089	80.9	−0.6
Registered electors		24,821		
Liberal hold		Swing	+0.4	

General election 1924: Horncastle
Party	Candidate	Votes	%	±%
Unionist	Henry Haslam	10,912	52.8	+7.3
Liberal	Samuel Pattinson	9,743	47.2	−7.3
Majority		1,169	5.6	N/A
Turnout		20,655	81.7	+0.8
Registered electors		25,286		
Unionist gain from Liberal		Swing	+7.3	

General election 1929: Horncastle
Party	Candidate	Votes	%	±%
Unionist	Henry Haslam	12,837	48.1	−4.7
Liberal	Frederick Linfield	10,168	38.1	−9.1
Labour	J. R. Sanderson	3,683	13.8	N/A
Majority		2,669	10.0	+4.4
Turnout		26,688	80.8	−0.9
Registered electors		33,042		
Unionist hold		Swing	+2.2	

=== Elections in the 1930s ===
General election 1931: Horncastle
Party	Candidate	Votes	%	±%
Conservative	Henry Haslam	18,100	67.3	+19.2
Liberal	George Henry John Dutton	8,788	32.7	−5.4
Majority		9,312	34.6	+24.6
Turnout		26,888	70.3	−10.5
Conservative hold		Swing	+12.3	

General election 1935: Horncastle
Party	Candidate	Votes	%	±%
Conservative	Henry Haslam	17,594	68.79	
Labour	Frank J Knowles	7,982	31.21	New
Majority		9,612	37.58	
Turnout		25,576	69.40	
Conservative hold		Swing		

=== Elections in the 1940s ===
General Election 1939–40

Another General Election was required to take place before the end of 1940. The political parties had been making preparations for an election to take place from 1939 and by the end of this year, the following candidates had been selected;

- Conservative: Henry Haslam
- Labour: Frank J Knowles

General election 1945: Horncastle
Party	Candidate	Votes	%	±%
Conservative	John Maitland	14,019	53.10	
Labour	George Holderness	7,052	26.72	
Liberal	Frank Emerson	5,329	20.18	New
Majority		6,967	26.38	
Turnout		26,403	70.45	
Conservative hold		Swing		

=== Elections in the 1950s ===
General election 1950: Horncastle
Party	Candidate	Votes	%	±%
Conservative	John Maitland	22,329	65.67	+12.57
Labour	Francis H Clark	11,671	34.33	+7.61
Majority		10,658	31.34	+4.92
Turnout		34,000	78.73	+8.28
Conservative hold		Swing	+2.48	

General election 1951: Horncastle
Party	Candidate	Votes	%	±%
Conservative	John Maitland	22,043	66.42	+0.75
Labour	Francis H Clark	11,143	33.58	−0.75
Majority		10,900	32.84	+1.50
Turnout		33,186	76.67	−2.06
Conservative hold		Swing	+0.75	

General election 1955: Horncastle
Party	Candidate	Votes	%	±%
Conservative	John Maitland	20,392	66.83	+0.41
Labour	Wilfrid Pashby	10,122	33.17	−0.41
Majority		10,270	33.66	+0.82
Turnout		30,514	71.01	−5.66
Conservative hold		Swing	+0.41	

General election 1959: Horncastle
Party	Candidate	Votes	%	±%
Conservative	John Maitland	19,799	66.60	−0.23
Labour	Hugh W Peck	9,928	33.40	+0.23
Majority		9,871	33.20	−0.46
Turnout		29,727	70.34	−0.67
Conservative hold		Swing	+0.23	

=== Elections in the 1960s ===
General election 1964: Horncastle
Party	Candidate	Votes	%	±%
Conservative	John Maitland	15,854	49.59	−17.01
Labour	Robin Brumby	8,069	25.24	−8.16
Liberal	T Frank Smith	8,044	25.16	New
Majority		7,785	24.35	−8.85
Turnout		31,967	74.73	+4.39
Conservative hold		Swing	−4.43	

General election 1966: Horncastle
Party	Candidate	Votes	%	±%
Conservative	Peter Tapsell	15,090	46.64	−2.95
Labour	Robert NH Sackur	9,715	30.02	+4.78
Liberal	T Frank Smith	7,552	23.34	−1.82
Majority		5,375	16.62	−7.73
Turnout		32,357	81.10	+6.37
Conservative hold		Swing	−3.86	

=== Elections in the 1970s ===
General election 1970: Horncastle
Party	Candidate	Votes	%	±%
Conservative	Peter Tapsell	19,299	55.35	+8.71
Labour	Eric A Skinns	8,860	25.41	−4.61
Liberal	Roger S Miller	6,707	19.24	−4.10
Majority		10,439	29.94	+13.32
Turnout		34,866	74.20	−6.90
Conservative hold		Swing	+7.69	

General election February 1974: Horncastle
Party	Candidate	Votes	%	±%
Conservative	Peter Tapsell	19,344	49.53	−5.82
Liberal	Roger S Miller	12,555	32.15	+12.91
Labour	AJR Berry	6,791	17.39	−1.85
Independent Democratic Alliance	EP Iszatt	367	0.94	New
Majority		6,789	17.38	−12.56
Turnout		39,057	79.33	+5.13
Conservative hold		Swing	−9.41	

General election October 1974: Horncastle
Party	Candidate	Votes	%	±%
Conservative	Peter Tapsell	16,750	47.71	−1.82
Liberal	MJC Starky	11,506	32.78	+0.63
Labour	K Bratton	6,849	19.51	+2.12
Majority		5,244	14.93	−2.45
Turnout		35,105	70.74	−8.59
Conservative hold		Swing	−1.23	

General election 1979: Horncastle
Party	Candidate	Votes	%	±%
Conservative	Peter Tapsell	21,362	55.12	+7.51
Liberal	MJC Starky	10,833	27.95	−4.83
Labour	DP Collins	6,240	16.10	−3.41
National Front	M Hook	319	0.82	New
Majority		10,529	27.17	+12.24
Turnout		38,754	75.21	+4.47
Conservative hold		Swing	+6.17	
