= Priscilla Fane, Countess of Westmorland =

British linguist and artist

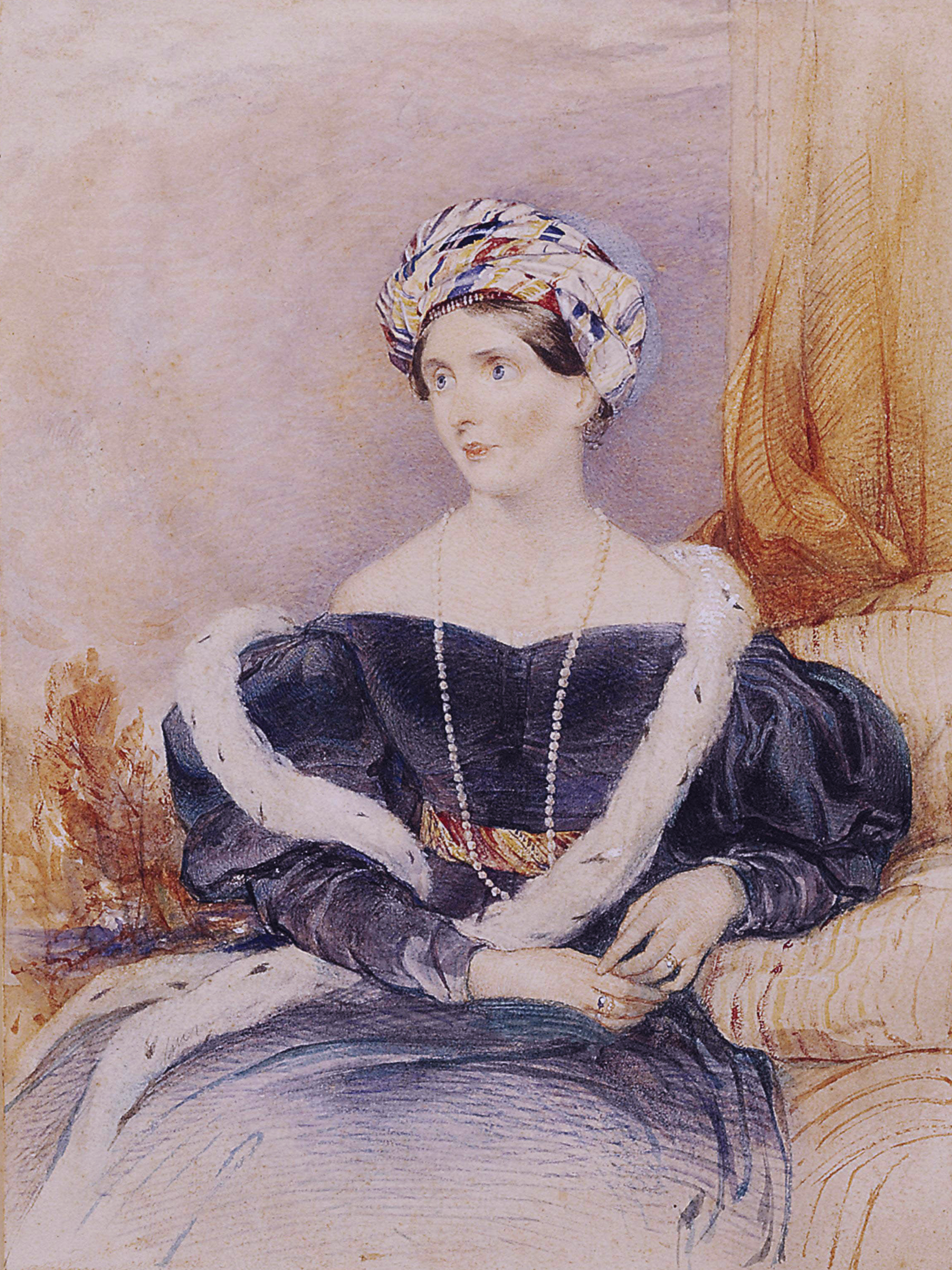
Priscilla (Wellesley-Pole), Countess of Westmorland (John Rogers Herbert)

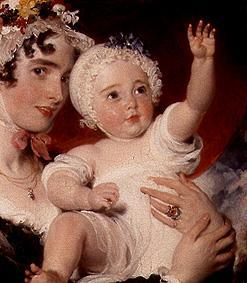
Lady Westmorland holding her second son George Fane (1819–1848).

Priscilla Anne Fane (née Wellesley-Pole), Countess of Westmorland (1793 – 18 February 1879), styled Lady Burghersh between 1811 and 1841, was a British linguist and artist.

== Life ==
Priscilla Anne Wellesley-Pole was the fourth child of the Honourable William Wellesley-Pole, later first Baron Maryborough and third Earl of Mornington, by Katharine Elizabeth, eldest daughter of Admiral the Honourable John Forbes. Arthur Wellesley, 1st Duke of Wellington, was her uncle. Priscilla was a great favourite with her uncle, who had a high opinion of her political judgement, as did Lord Melbourne who used her as intermediary when discussing with Wellington the possible formation of a coalition Government in 1837.

In 1811, she married John Fane, Lord Burghersh, son of John Fane, 10th Earl of Westmorland, with whom she had five sons and one daughter: of her children only Francis Fane, 12th Earl of Westmorland and Lady Rose Weighell survived her. She became known as the Countess of Westmorland when her husband succeeded as eleventh Earl of Westmorland in 1841. She was an accomplished linguist and a distinguished artist. When Lady Burghersh, she exhibited six figure pieces in the Suffolk Street Exhibition between 1833 and 1841, and afterwards in 1843 and 1857 sent two scriptural subjects to the British Institution. Her picture of Anne, Countess of Mornington, surrounded by her three distinguished sons, Lord Wellesley, the Duke of Wellington and Lord Cowley, has been engraved, and is well known.

She received art lessons from William Salter and was his indulgent patron. When Salter was on his horse in Hyde Park, he happened to hear and then see the spectacle of a victory banquet in progress at the Duke of Wellington's house. Burghersh persuaded the Duke to let Salter commemorate the event, and Salter's masterpiece was created with 83 included portraits.

She died at 29 Portman Square, London, 18 February 1879, and was buried at Apethorpe, Northamptonshire, 25 February. Her daughter, Lady Rose Weigall, edited two volumes of selections from her correspondence.

== Works ==
- The letters of Lady Burghersh (afterwards countess of Westmorland) from Germany and France during the campaign of 1813-14. London: John Murray. 1893. Republished Cornell University Library, 2009. ISBN 1-112-58028-X
- Correspondence of Lady Burghersh with the Duke of Wellington. London: John Murray and Company. 1903.
