= Gerry Weigall =

English cricketer

Gerald John Villiers Weigall
- Born: 19 October 1870; Wimbledon, Surrey, England
- Died: 17 May 1944 (aged 73); Dublin, Ireland
- Relatives: Louis Weigall (brother); Archibald Weigall (brother); Evelyn Weigall (brother)
- Cricket career

Personal information
- Nickname: Gerry
- Batting: Right-handed

Domestic team information
- Years: Team
- 1891-1892: Cambridge University
- 1891-1903: Kent
- 1917-1923: Europeans (India)

Career statistics
Competition	First-class
Matches	232
Runs scored	6,866
Batting average	19.39
100s/50s	3/28
Top score	138*
Balls bowled	52
Wickets	1
Bowling average	45.00
5 wickets in innings	0
10 wickets in match	0
Best bowling	1/4
Catches/stumpings	92/0
- Source: ESPNcricinfo, 25 June 2026

Gerald John Villiers Weigall (19 October 1870 – 17 May 1944) was an English cricketer.

== Family ==
Born in Wimbledon, Weigall was the son of a Victorian artist, Henry Weigall (best known for his portrait of Benjamin Disraeli in 1878–1879), and his wife, the writer Lady Rose Sophia Mary Fane. Through his mother, he was connected to several powerful aristocratic dynasties including the Duke of Wellington. A younger brother was Lieutenant-Colonel Sir William Ernest George Archibald Weigall, 1st Baronet, KCMG, a Conservative MP who was Governor of South Australia. Two other brothers, Louis and Evelyn, were also first-class cricketers.

He married Josephine Harrison, daughter of Captain William John Rose Harrison, in 1897; their son, John Henry Francis Weigall, was born the following year on 10 September 1898 who was injured in WWI and later became a policeman in Rhodesia.

== Career ==
Gerry Weigall was educated at Wellington College, Berkshire, before going up to Emmanuel College, Cambridge, in 1889. He made his first-class debut for Kent County Cricket Club as an opening batsman against Marylebone Cricket Club (MCC) in 1891; scoring a half-century in the second innings, before achieving his Cambridge blue later in the season. An all-round sportsman, he also represented Cambridge in rackets, and popularised squash — a sport he played into his seventies.

A defensive batsman with a strong cut shot, he often batted down the order after leaving Cambridge and often added useful runs, including his highest first-class score of 138 not out which helped Kent to victory over the Gentlemen of Philadelphia in 1897.

Following his playing career, Weigall became a coach, coaching young players from Kent's Tonbridge Nursery and the second eleven. He is credited with the discovery of Les Ames; who went on to play in 47 Test matches for England. He also coached Yorkshire Colts for a time. As a coach, he was noted as a "stickler for orthodox batting", and would demonstrate a perfect technique with items ranging from borrowed bats to umbrellas.

He was a great character. According to E. W. Swanton, "He always had a few pet bees buzzing around in his bonnet, and used to inveigh against the criminal folly of selectors and authority generally if their view did not match his own." When Maurice Leyland was preferred to Frank Woolley in the touring party to Australia in 1928–29, he fulminated against the selection of a "cross-batted village-greener". When he scored 63 not out in the 1892 University Match, three of the best Cambridge batsmen were run out during his innings, including no less a figure than F.S. Jackson, his captain. When it appeared that one of them would have to go, Weigall is supposed to have sacrificed his partner by calling: "Get back, Jacker. I'm set." Swanton sums him up thus: "... he may well sound a rather preposterous fellow... I can only say that every cricketer was his friend, and that he never spoke an unkind word about anyone."

He died in a Dublin Hospital on 17 May 1944, "troubled by illness from the outbreak of war".

== Bibliography ==
- Carlaw, Derek (2020). Kent County Cricketers, A to Z: Part One (1806–1914) (PDF). Cardiff: ACS.
