= Archibald Weigall =

British politician and Governor of South Australia (1874–1952)

Lieutenant Colonel Sir Archibald Weigall Bt KCMG
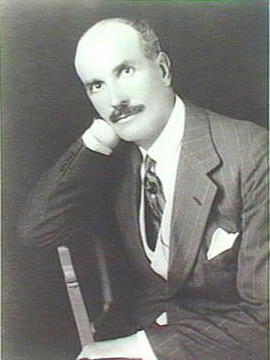

18th Governor of South Australia
- In office 9 June 1920 – 30 May 1922
- Monarch: George V
- Premier: Henry Barwell
- Preceded by: Sir Henry Galway
- Succeeded by: Tom Bridges

Member of Parliament for Horncastle
- In office 16 February 1911 – 2 February 1920
- Preceded by: Lord Willoughby de Eresby
- Succeeded by: Stafford Vere Hotchkin

Personal details
- Born: 8 December 1874
- Died: 3 June 1952 (aged 77)
- Education: Royal Agricultural College

Sir William Ernest George Archibald Weigall, 1st Baronet, KCMG (8 December 1874 – 3 June 1952) was a British Conservative politician who served as Governor of South Australia from 9 June 1920 until 30 May 1922.

== Family ==
Weigall was the fifth son of a Victorian artist, Henry Weigall, and his wife, Lady Rose Sophia Mary FaneThrough his mother, he was connected to several powerful aristocratic dynasties. One of his older brothers was the cricketer Gerry Weigall (born Gerald John Villiers Weigall). Two other brothers, Louis and Evelyn, were also first-class cricketers.

He married 16 August 1910 in Metheringham, Lincolnshire, a divorcee, Grace Emily, Baroness von Eckardstein, née Grace Emily Blundell Maple (St. George Hanover Square, London, 1876–1950), only surviving child of the deceased furniture magnate Sir John Blundell Maple, 1st Baronet (1845–1903), who had left her a fortune of £2,153,000

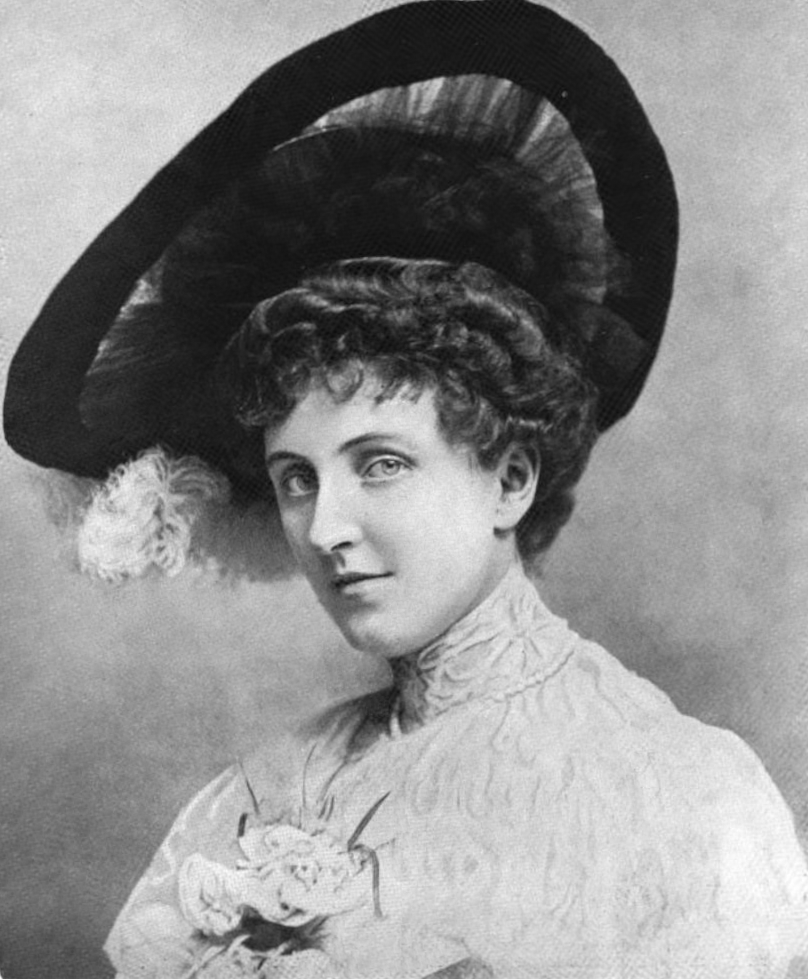
Grace Emily Blundell Maple (1876–1950)

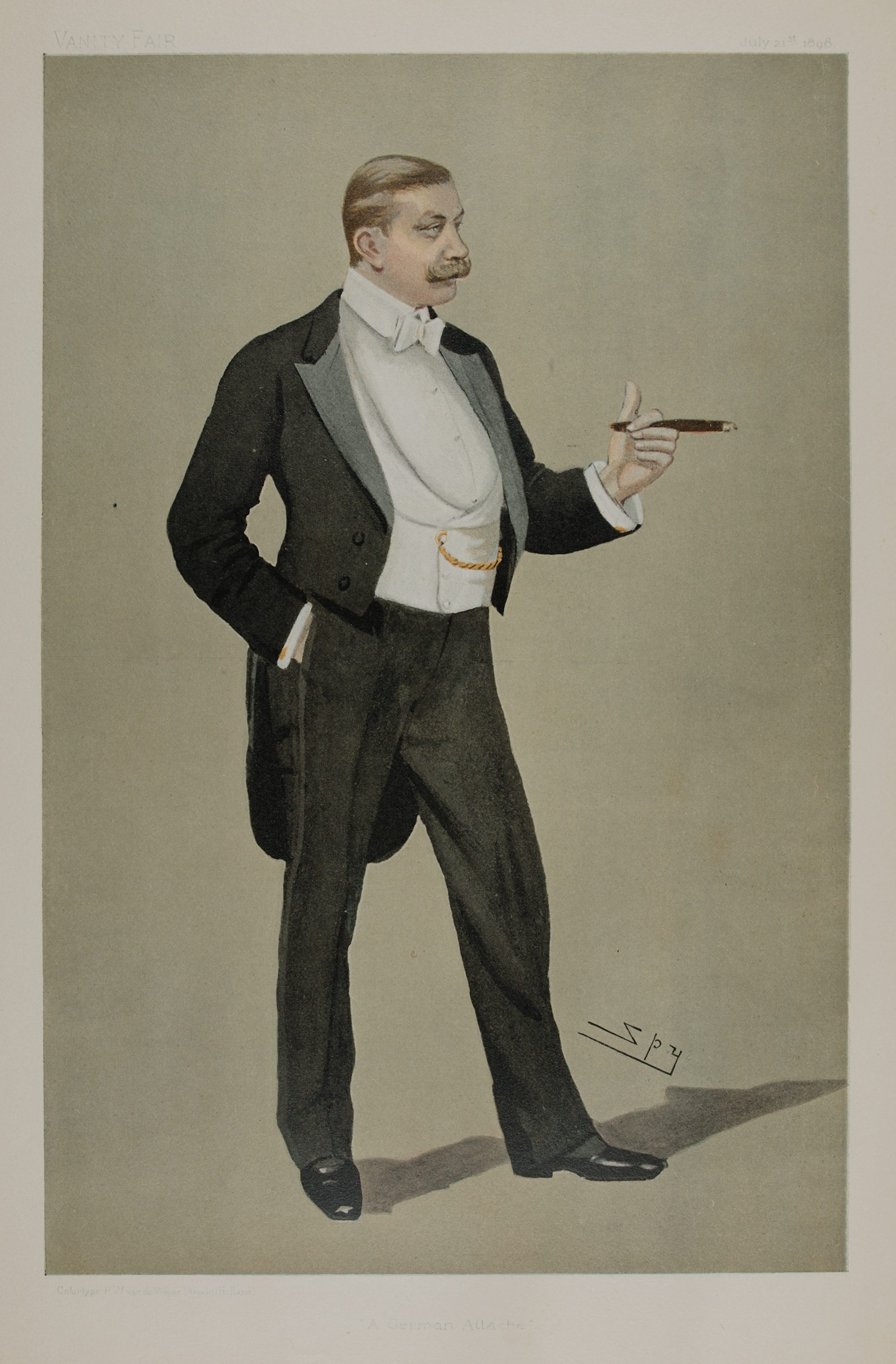
Baron Hermann von Eckardstein (1864–1933) in London."A German attaché", a caricature by Spy in Vanity Fair, 1898.

(Note: Ordinarily, a marriage to a divorcee would have wrecked his career.) By his wife, Weigall had one daughter; his wife also suffered several miscarriages, including in Australia. Their country residence was Englemere House at Ascot in Berkshire.

His daughter Priscilla Crystal Frances Blundell Weigall married on 23 July 1935 Edward Richard Assheton Penn Curzon, CBE (1908–1984), son and heir of Francis Richard Henry Penn Curzon, 5th Earl Howe and wife and cousin Mary Curzon. They had two daughters before they divorced in 1943. She married secondly Robert Coriat, born Harold Isaac Coriat (b. Mogador), son of Abraham Coriat and wife Donna Florence "Flora" Cazes (b. London, Middlesex), daughter of Isaac Juave Cazes and wife Selina Simha or Semah Corcos, who were from Morocco, all Sephardi Jews. Their daughter, British socialite Susan Ann Caroline Coriat married Thomas Evelyn "Tommy" Weber (originally Thomas Ejnar Arkner), a race car driver who also came from a wealthy family. His father was born in Denmark, of Danish and English descent, son of Poul Arkner, born Poul Christian Anderson (b. Denmark) and wife Pamela Joyce Weber (b. Hertford, Hertfordshire), daughter of Reginald Evelyn Weber and wife Joyce Warner. Weigall's great-grandson is British actor Jake Weber.

== Early life and military career ==
Educated at Wellington College, Berkshire, and the Royal Agricultural College, Cirencester, Weigall became an estate manager.

He joined the 3rd (Militia) Battalion of the Northamptonshire Regiment (the Northampton and Rutland Militia). He was promoted to captain on 4 April 1902, when the battalion left for South Africa as reinforcement for what turned out to be the last stages of the Second Boer War. Following the end of the war in June 1902, Weigall and the other men of the 3rd battalion left Cape Town on the SS Scot in early September, and returned to Northampton after arrival in the United Kingdom later the same month. He was later promoted to major. In World War I, he served with the Northamptonshire Regiment and on the Staff, finishing with the rank of lieutenant colonel.

== Political career ==
Weigall unsuccessfully fought the seat of Gainsborough for the Conservatives at the December 1910 general election.

He stood successfully in a by-election at Horncastle in Lincolnshire on 16 February 1911. The by-election was caused by the sitting Conservative MP Lord Willoughby de Eresby, who had held Horncastle at each election since 1895, succeeding to the peerage on the death of his father, the Earl of Ancaster. Weigall received 4,955 votes, with a majority of 107 over the Liberal candidate, Frederick Linfield.

He remained an MP until he resigned in 1920 to become Governor of South Australia.

== Governor of South Australia ==
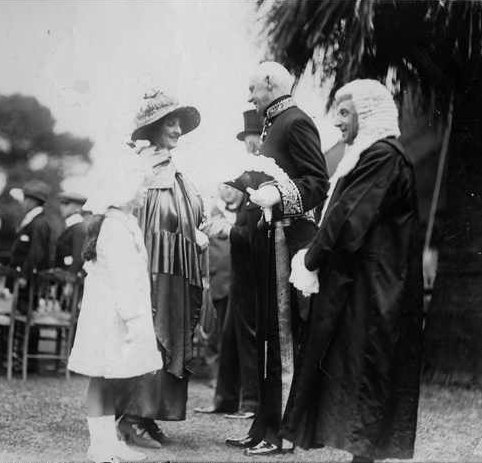
Lady Weigall, accompanied by her daughter Priscilla greeting Sir George Murray, Lieutenant Governor and Justice Angas Parsons at a garden party held in the grounds of Government House, Adelaide

In 1919, Weigall accepted an appointment as Governor of South Australia. He was appointed KCMG in 1920, and soon left for Adelaide, arriving in June. He very quickly became disenchanted with the State Parliament; he became extremely frustrated with the way in which ministers would spend money before being granted supply, or transfer funds voted for one purpose to another. Although never explicitly calling for the abolition of the States, he did describe the results of the division of power in Australia as being "farcical" and "chaotic", and concluded that "State Governors and State Legislatures are now anachronisms".

Weigall sought leave to resign in December 1921, citing "personal and financial" reasons. The Colonial Office had assured him that the State Government would pick up the wages of his staff. This was not the case, and left Weigall with £300 per annum. (Note: £300 was in 1920 the salary of a teacher or manager of a small business.) His departure prompted Premier Henry Barwell to raise the Governor's salary.

Due to the times, many of the war memorials in country towns around South Australia were opened by him as he travelled around the state, it being only a few years after the end of World War I. These include laying the foundation stone at Burra, unveiling the memorial at Hallett, and opening the new tennis courts at the Memorial Drive Tennis Centre in Adelaide.

Weigall Oval in the suburb of Plympton, and Weigall (formerly Woolshed Flat) along the River Murray were both named in his honour.

Lady Weigall is remembered in South Australia for her support of several causes: she was a very active Patroness of Minda Home, and supporter of the Mothers and Babies' Health Association. The Lady Weigall hospital in Barmera was named in her honor.

== Later honours ==
He was appointed High Sheriff of Lincolnshire for 1926–27.

Weigall was created a Baronet, Weigall of Woodhall Spa, in 1938, and was made King of Arms of the Order of St Michael and St George also in 1938. He was appointed High Sheriff of Berkshire for 1944–45.

Since he had no sons, his Baronetcy died with him.

Coat of arms of Archibald Weigall

Notes
Granted by the College of Arms, 15 December 1938.
Crest
A demi-lion guardant Sable gorged with a circlet and holding in the paws a torch Or inflamed Proper.
Escutcheon
Sable on a fess between two eagles displayed Or a lion passant of the first gorged with a circlet of the second.
Motto
Semper Fidelis

== Notes and references ==
Government offices
Preceded by Sir Henry Galway	Governor of South Australia; 1920–1922	Succeeded by Sir Tom Bridges
Parliament of the United Kingdom
Preceded by Lord Willoughby de Eresby	Member of Parliament for Horncastle; 1911–1920	Succeeded by Stafford Hotchkin
Heraldic offices
Preceded by Sir Frank Swettenham	King of Arms of the Order of St Michael and St George; 1938–1952	Succeeded by Sir Nevile Bland
Baronetage of the United Kingdom
New creation	Baronet (of Woodhall Spa); 1938–1952	Extinct
