= Baron Willoughby de Eresby =

Title in the Peerage of England

Barony of Willoughby de Eresby
- Quarterly, 1st and 4th, or fretty azure (for Willoughby); 2nd, or three bars wavy gules (for Drummond); 3rd, ermine three pomeis, each charged with a cross or (for Heathcote)
- Creation date: 26 July 1313
- Created by: Edward II
- Peerage: Peerage of England
- First holder: Robert de Willoughby
- Present holder: Jane Heathcote-Drummond-Willoughby, 28th Baroness Willoughby de Eresby
- Heir presumptive: Sebastian St. Maur Miller (co-heir); Sir John Aird, 4th Baronet (co-heir)
- Motto: Loyauté me oblige ("Loyalty binds me")

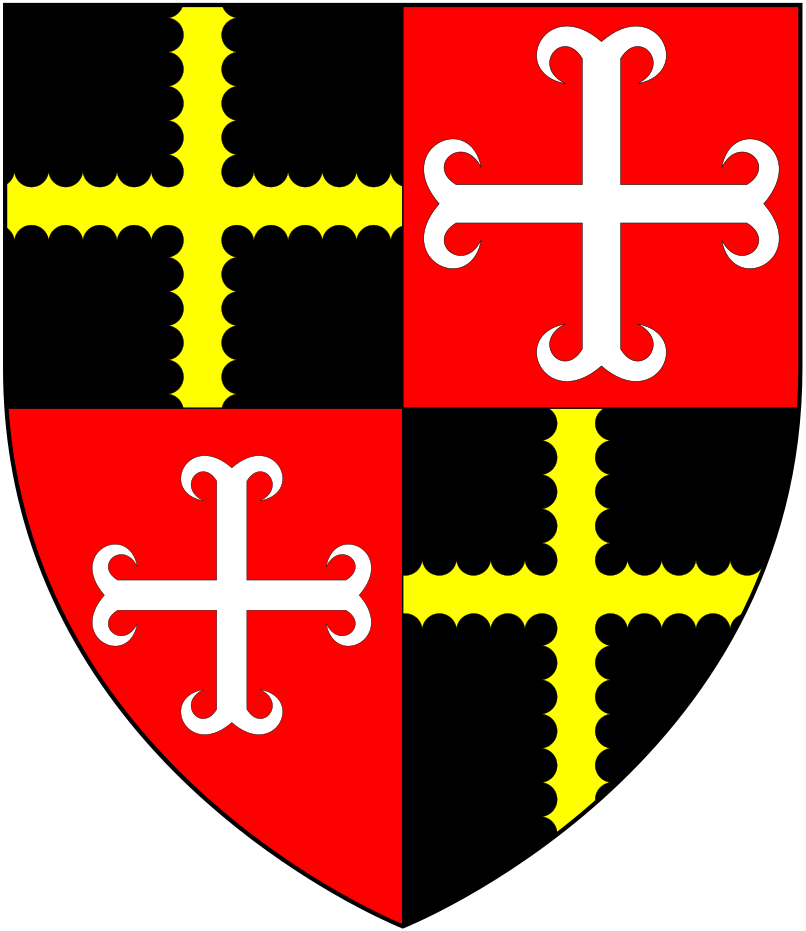
Arms of Willoughby, adopted by the 3rd Baron Willoughby de Eresby upon his marriage (c. 1349) to Cecily Ufford: Quarterly 1 & 4: Sable, a cross engrailed or (Ufford); 2 & 3: Gules, a cross moline argent (Bec of Eresby)

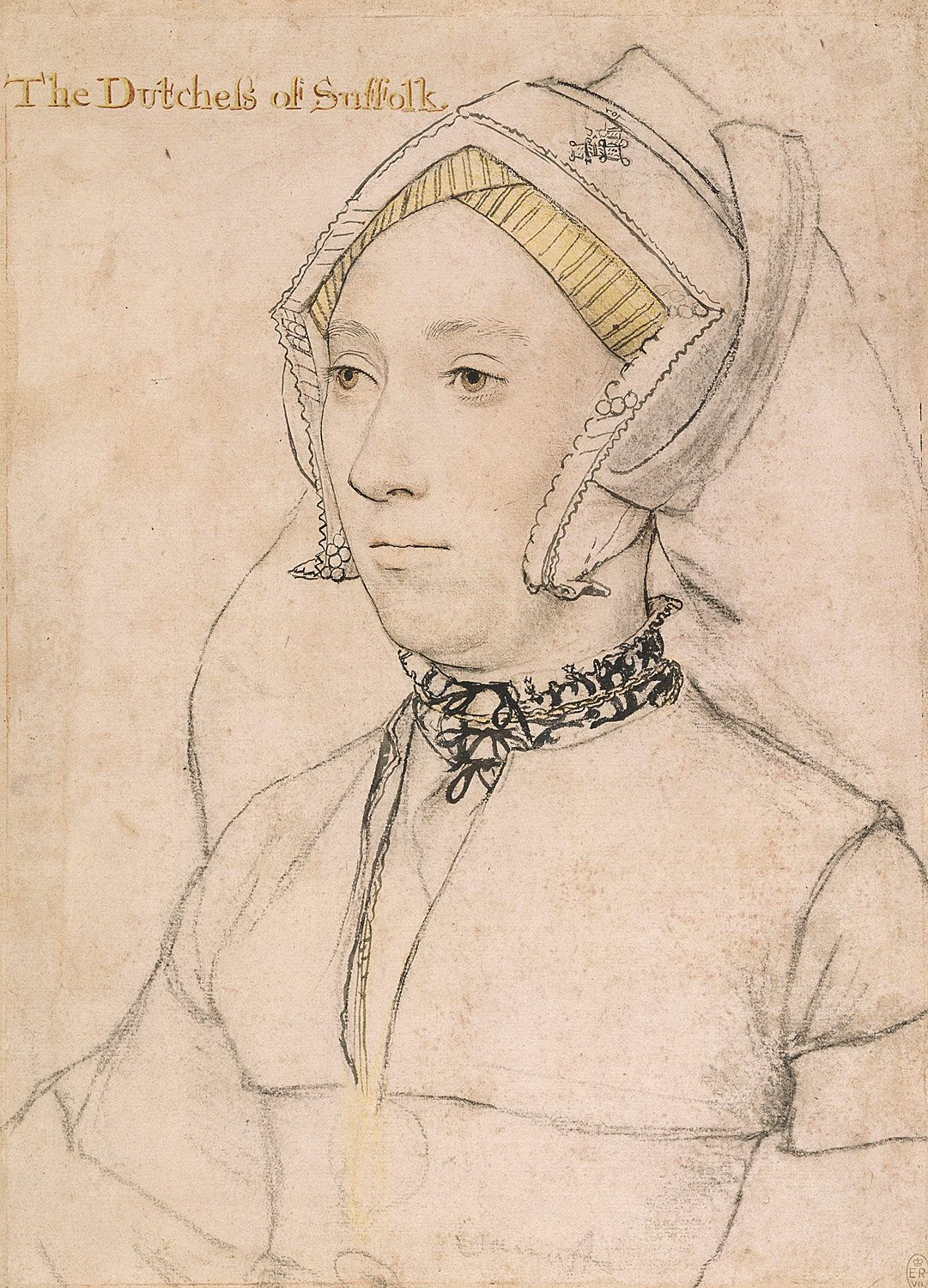
Katherine Willoughby, 12th Baroness Willoughby de Eresby

Baron Willoughby de Eresby (/ˈwɪləbi ˈdɪərzbi/ WIL-ə-bee DEERZ-bee) is a title in the Peerage of England. It was created in 1313 for Robert de Willoughby. Since 1983, the title has been held by Jane Heathcote-Drummond-Willoughby, 28th Baroness Willoughby de Eresby.

== History ==
The title of Baron Willoughby was created by writ in 1313 for Robert de Willoughby, lord of the manor of Eresby in the parish of Spilsby, Lincolnshire. He was the son of Sir William de Willoughby and Alice, daughter of John Beke, 1st Baron Beke of Eresby. The writ was addressed to "Roberto de Wylghby", and the suffix of de Eresby was added to the title between 1350 and 1360 to distinguish it from other members of the de Willoughby family.

The fourteenth Baron was created Earl of Lindsey in 1626. His great-grandson, the fourth Earl and seventeenth Baron, was created Marquess of Lindsey in 1706 and Duke of Ancaster and Kesteven in 1715. On the death of the first Duke's great-grandson, the fourth Duke, the Dukedom, Marquessate and Earldom were inherited by his uncle, while the Barony of Willoughby de Eresby fell into abeyance between the late Duke's sisters Lady Priscilla and Lady Georgiana. In 1780, the title was called out of abeyance in favour of Priscilla. She was the wife of Peter Burrell, 1st Baron Gwydyr. Their son Peter inherited both Baronies. On the death of Peter's only son Albyric, the Barony of Gwydyr was passed on to a cousin, while the Barony of Willoughby de Eresby fell into abeyance between his sisters Clementina Drummond-Willoughby, wife of Gilbert John Heathcote, 1st Baron Aveland and Charlotte, wife of Robert Carrington, 2nd Baron Carrington. In 1871 the abeyance was terminated in favour of Clementina. She was succeeded by her and Lord Aveland's son Gilbert, 2nd Baron Aveland and 25th Baron Willoughby de Eresby. In 1892 he was created Earl of Ancaster, a revival of the Ancaster title created for his maternal ancestor in 1715. On the death of his grandson, the third Earl, in 1983, the Earldom and Barony of Aveland became extinct (while the Baronetcy also held by the Earl was passed on to a distant relative), while the Barony of Willoughby de Eresby was inherited by the late Earl's daughter, Nancy, the present holder of the title.

Since 1626, the Barony of Willoughby de Eresby has been associated with office of Lord Great Chamberlain. In that year, the first Earl of Lindsey inherited the Great Chamberlainship. Upon the death of the fourth Duke of Ancaster and Kesteven, it was divided between his sisters Priscilla and Georgiana (who was later Marchioness of Cholmondeley). Thereafter, the barony of Willoughby de Eresby has been associated with the senior share of the Lord Great Chamberlainship. However, it has not been associated with the highest share. The share belonging to Lady Cholmondeley has been passed intact to her heirs, the Marquesses of Cholmondeley, but Lady Willoughby de Eresby's share has been split between many heirs. As of 2004, only one-fourth of the Lord Great Chamberlainship is possessed by the holder of the barony.

The peerage has been held by a woman six times, more than any other peerage except that of Baron de Ros.

The family seats are Grimsthorpe Castle in Edenham, near Bourne, Lincolnshire and Drummond Castle, near Crieff, Perthshire, Scotland, originally the family seat of the Drummond earls of Perth. Both are managed by the Grimsthorpe and Drummond Castle Trust.

== Barons Willoughby de Eresby (1313) ==
The Ancient Arms of Willoughby (bef. 1300 – c. 1349)

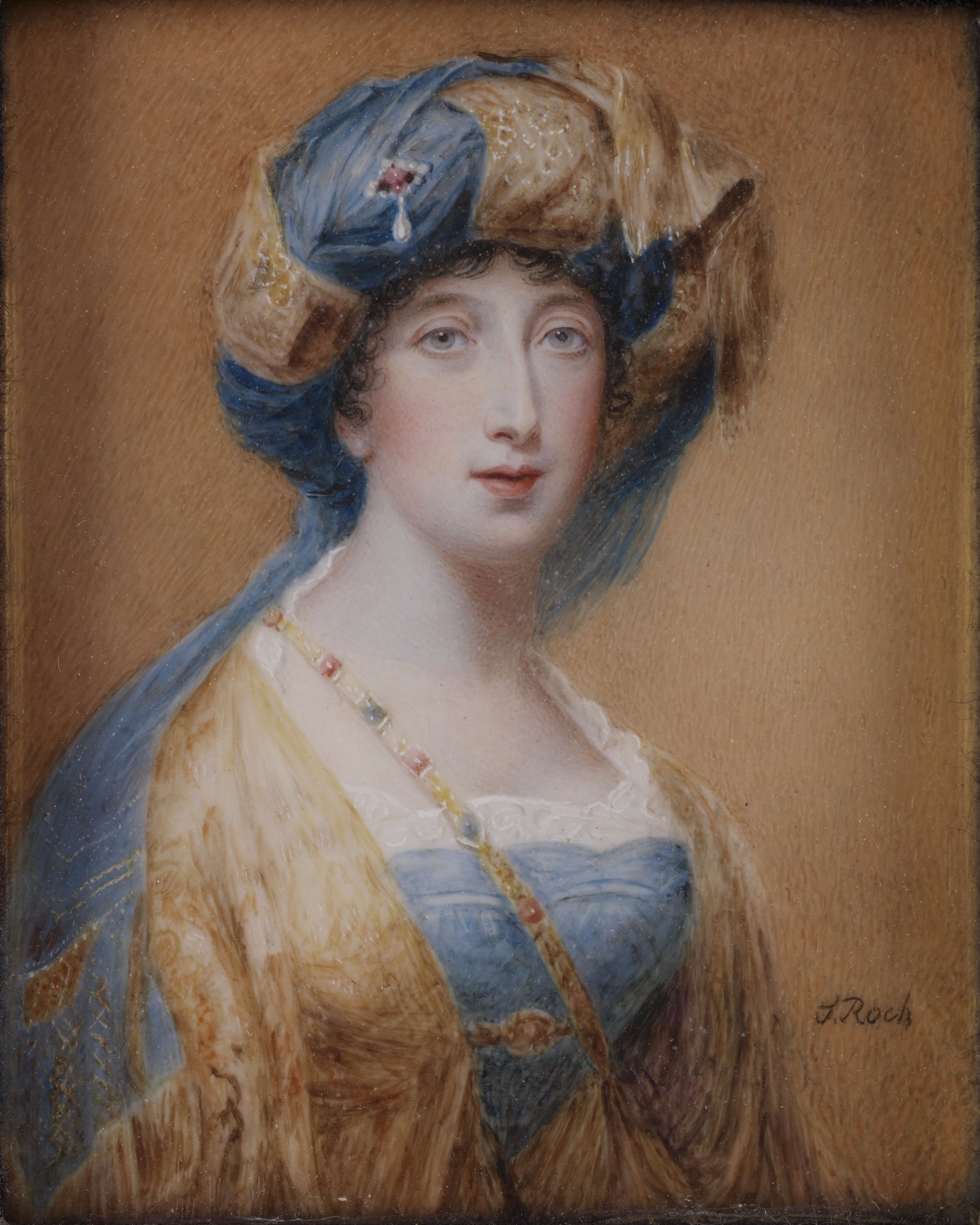
Priscilla Bertie, 21st Baroness Willoughby de Eresby (1761–1828), portrait miniature by Sampson Towgood Roch

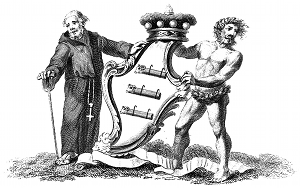
Arms of Bertie: Argent, three battering rams fesswise in pale or headed armed and garnished azure (family of Priscilla Barbara Elizabeth Bertie, 21st Baroness Willoughby de Eresby (1761–1828))

- Robert de Willoughby, 1st Baron Willoughby de Eresby(1260–1317)
- John de Willoughby, 2nd Baron Willoughby de Eresby (1304–1349)
- John de Willoughby, 3rd Baron Willoughby de Eresby (1329–1372)
- Robert Willoughby, 4th Baron Willoughby de Eresby (1349–1396)
- William Willoughby, 5th Baron Willoughby de Eresby (1370–1409), KG
  - Married Lucy le Strange and Joan Holland. His daughter Margery, by Lucy, married William FitzHugh, 4th Lord FitzHugh of Ravensworth and had a son Henry who became the 5th Lord FitzHugh. Two of the 5th Lord FitzHugh's daughters included Alice and Elizabeth FitzHugh. Elizabeth, from her first marriage, was the mother of Sir Thomas Parr and thus paternal grandmother of Queen Consort Katherine Parr.
- Robert Willoughby, 6th Baron Willoughby de Eresby (1385–1452)
- Joan Willoughby, 7th Baroness Willoughby de Eresby (d. 1462)
- Robert Welles, 8th Baron Willoughby de Eresby (d. 1470)
- Joan Welles, 9th Baroness Willoughby de Eresby (d. 1475)
- Christopher Willoughby, 10th Baron Willoughby de Eresby (1453–1499)
- William Willoughby, 11th Baron Willoughby de Eresby (1482–1526)
- Katherine Willoughby, 12th Baroness Willoughby de Eresby, Duchess of Suffolk (1519–1580)
- Peregrine Bertie, 13th Baron Willoughby de Eresby (1555–1601)
- Robert Bertie, 1st Earl of Lindsey, 14th Baron Willoughby de Eresby (1582–1642)
- Montagu Bertie, 2nd Earl of Lindsey, 15th Baron Willoughby de Eresby (d. 1666)
- Robert Bertie, 3rd Earl of Lindsey, 16th Baron Willoughby de Eresby (1630–1701)
- Robert Bertie, 1st Duke of Ancaster and Kesteven, 17th Baron Willoughby de Eresby (1660–1723)
- Peregrine Bertie, 2nd Duke of Ancaster and Kesteven, 18th Baron Willoughby de Eresby (1686–1742)
- Peregrine Bertie, 3rd Duke of Ancaster and Kesteven, 19th Baron Willoughby de Eresby (1714–1778)
- Robert Bertie, 4th Duke of Ancaster and Kesteven, 20th Baron Willoughby de Eresby (1756–1779) (abeyant 1779)
- Priscilla Barbara Elizabeth Bertie, 21st Baroness Willoughby de Eresby (1761–1828) (abeyance terminated 1780)
- Peter Robert Drummond-Burrell, 22nd Baron Willoughby de Eresby, 2nd Baron Gwydyr (1782–1865)
- Albyric Drummond-Willoughby, 23rd Baron Willoughby de Eresby, 3rd Baron Gwydyr (d. 1870) (abeyant 1870)
- Clementina Elizabeth Drummond-Willoughby, 24th Baroness Willoughby de Eresby (1809–1888) (abeyance terminated 1871)
- Gilbert Henry Heathcote-Drummond-Willoughby, 1st Earl of Ancaster, 25th Baron Willoughby de Eresby (1830–1910)
- Gilbert Heathcote-Drummond-Willoughby, 2nd Earl of Ancaster, 26th Baron Willoughby de Eresby (1867–1951)
- Gilbert James Heathcote-Drummond-Willoughby, 3rd Earl of Ancaster, 27th Baron Willoughby de Eresby (1907–1983)
- (Nancy) Jane Marie Heathcote-Drummond-Willoughby, 28th Baroness Willoughby de Eresby (b. 1934)

As of 2023 the co-heirs presumptive are:

- Sebastian St. Maur Miller (b. 1965), son of Carola Ramsden, the only child of the 26th Baron's elder daughter, Lady Catherine, and
- Sir James John Aird, 5th Baronet (b. 1978), son of Sir John Aird, 4th Baronet, only son of the 26th Baron's younger daughter, Lady Priscilla.

== See also ==
- Baron Gwydyr
- Baron Middleton
- Earl of Lindsey
- Earl of Abingdon
- Heathcote baronets
