= Brownlow Bertie, 5th Duke of Ancaster and Kesteven =

British peer and politician

His Grace The Duke of Ancaster and Kesteven PC

Lord Lieutenant of Lincolnshire
- In office 1779–1809
- Preceded by: The Duke of Ancaster and Kesteven
- Succeeded by: The Lord Brownlow

Member of Parliament for Lincolnshire
- In office 1761–1779 Serving with Thomas Whichcot; Charles Anderson-Pelham
- Preceded by: Robert Vyner; Thomas Whichcot
- Succeeded by: John Thorold; Charles Anderson-Pelham

Personal details
- Born: Brownlow Bertie; 1 May 1729 Lindsey House
- Died: 8 February 1809 (aged 79) Grimsthorpe
- Spouses: Harriot Pitt (m. 1762; died 1763) Mary Anne Layard (m. 1769; died 1804)
- Relations: Peregrine Bertie, 3rd Duke of Ancaster and Kesteven (brother); Robert Bertie, 4th Duke of Ancaster and Kesteven (nephew); Priscilla Bertie, 21st Baroness Willoughby de Eresby (niece)
- Children: Lady Mary Elizabeth Bertie
- Parent(s): Peregrine Bertie, 2nd Duke of Ancaster and Kesteven; Jane Brownlow

Brownlow Bertie, 5th Duke of Ancaster PC (1 May 1729 – 8 February 1809), styled Lord Brownlow Bertie until 1779, was a British peer and politician who sat in the House of Commons from 1761 to 1779 when he succeeded to a peerage.

== Early life ==
Bertie was the son of Peregrine Bertie, 2nd Duke of Ancaster and Kesteven and Jane Brownlow, and the younger brother of Peregrine Bertie, 3rd Duke of Ancaster and Kesteven, and uncle of Robert Bertie, 4th Duke of Ancaster and Kesteven and Priscilla Bertie, 21st Baroness Willoughby de Eresby. He was baptized in London in the Church of St Giles in the Fields, Holborn.

== Career ==
Bertie was Member of Parliament for Lincolnshire from 1761 to 1779, became Lord Lieutenant of Lincolnshire on 12 February 1779, and was invested as Privy Counsellor on the same day. On his nephew's death on 8 July 1779, he succeeded him as 5th and last Duke of Ancaster and Kesteven and Marquess of Lindsey and as 8th Earl of Lindsey.

== Personal life ==
Ancaster married twice. His first wife, whom he married on 11 November 1762 at the house of General Durand in Cork Street, Burlington Gardens, London, was Harriot Pitt (1745–1763), the only daughter and heiress of George Morton Pitt. After the death of his first wife on 23 April 1763, he remarried to Mary Anne Layard (1733–1804), a daughter of Maj Peter Layard of Sutton Friars, on 2 January 1769 in St James's. His first marriage was childless, while with his second wife he had one daughter:

- Lady Mary Elizabeth Bertie (1771–1797), married to Thomas Charles Colyear, 4th Earl of Portmore (1772–1835) on 26 May 1793; her son Brownlow-Charles Colyear inherited much property from his ducal grandfather but died in 1819 before he could inherit his father's titles.

The dukedom and the marquessate became extinct on his own death, while the earldom passed to his kinsman Albemarle Bertie. The Duke of Ancaster's funeral took place on 17 February 1809 at St Mary's Church in Swinstead, Lincolnshire.

Parliament of Great Britain
Preceded by Robert Vyner; Thomas Whichcot	Member of Parliament for Lincolnshire; 1761–1779; With: Thomas Whichcot (1761-1774); Charles Anderson-Pelham (1774-1779)	Succeeded by John Thorold; Charles Anderson-Pelham
Honorary titles
Preceded by The Duke of Ancaster and Kesteven	Lord Lieutenant of Lincolnshire; 1779–1809	Succeeded by The Lord Brownlow
Peerage of Great Britain
Preceded by Robert Bertie	Duke of Ancaster and Kesteven; 1779–1809	Extinct
Peerage of England
Preceded by Robert Bertie	Earl of Lindsey; 1779–1809	Succeeded by Albemarle Bertie
