= Harriet Cholmondeley =

English peer (c.1790-1815)

The Honourable Harriet Cholmondeley
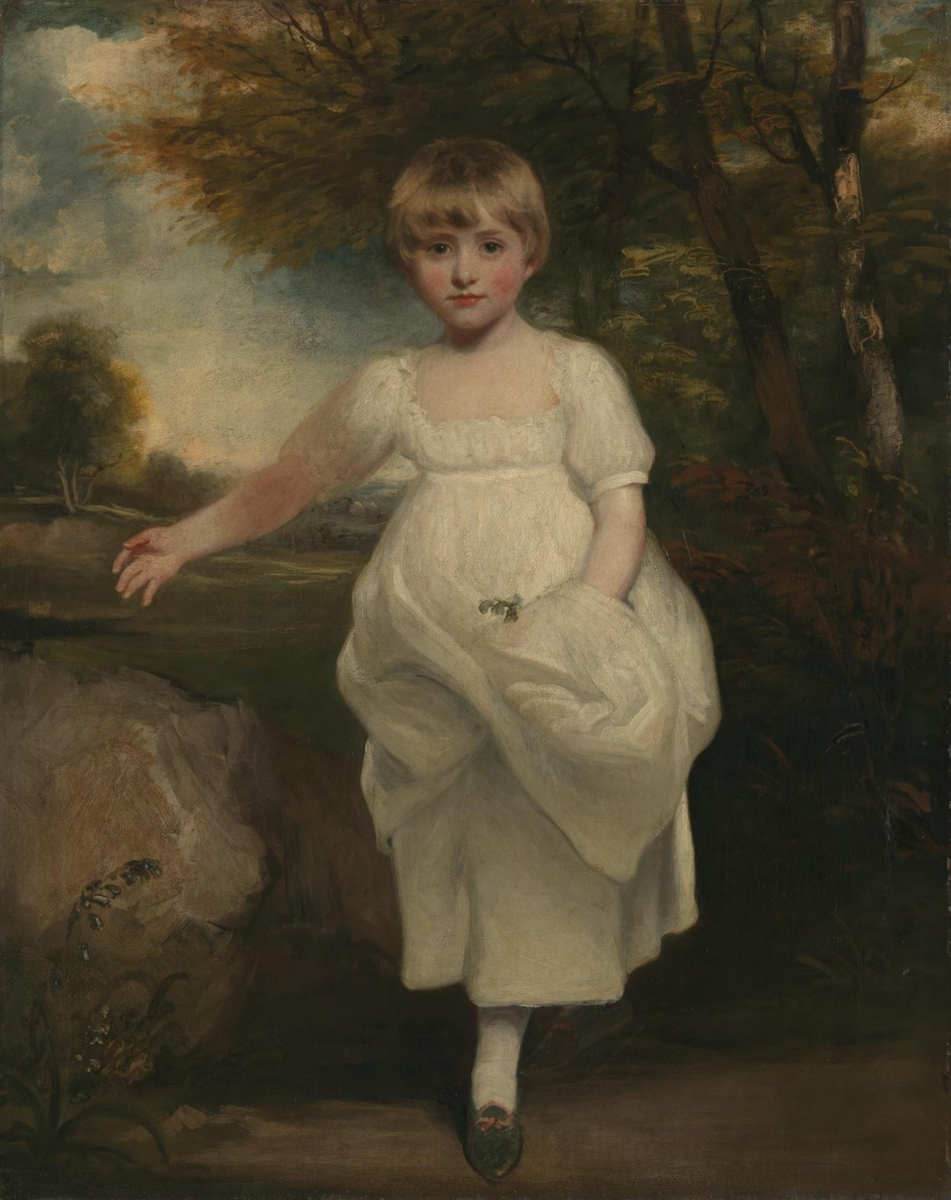
- Portrait by John Hoppner
- Born: c.1790
- Died: 11 July 1815
- Noble family: Cholmondeley (illegitimate)
- Spouse: John Lambton (m. 1812; died 1815)
- Issue: Lady Frances Charlotte; The Hon. Georgiana Sarah Elizabeth; The Hon. Harriet Caroline
- Father: George Cholmondeley, 1st Marquess of Cholmondeley
- Mother: Madame Saint-Albin

Harriet Cholmondeley (c.1790 – 11 July 1815), sometimes called "Lady" or "The Hon" Harriet Cholmondeley, was the first wife of John Lambton, 1st Earl of Durham.

She was an illegitimate daughter of George Cholmondeley, 1st Marquess of Cholmondeley, by his mistress, Madame Saint-Albin, and was brought up in the Cholmondeley household at Cholmondeley Castle in Cheshire by the marquess and his wife Georgiana, whom he married in 1791. A portrait of her as a child, by John Hoppner, is held by the Tate Gallery.

Lambton, who at the time was a commoner, an army officer and the son of an MP, was under 21 and was refused permission to marry by his guardians. Harriet's father also forbade the marriage. The couple eloped to Scotland and married at Gretna Green on 1 January 1812; they subsequently went through an Anglican wedding ceremony on Harriet's father's estate at Malpas, Cheshire, on 28 January. They had three daughters, all of whom died as young women:

- Lady Frances Charlotte (16 October 1812 – 18 December 1835), who married the Hon. John Ponsonby (later 5th Earl of Bessborough), but died a few months later of consumption; they had no children.
- The Hon. Georgiana Sarah Elizabeth (2 March 1814 – 3 January 1833), who died unmarried
- The Hon. Harriet Caroline (30 May 1815 – 12 June 1832), who died unmarried

Harriet died, probably of tuberculosis, a few weeks after the birth of her youngest daughter.
