= George Cholmondeley, 2nd Marquess of Cholmondeley =

British peer

The Most Honourable The Marquess of Cholmondeley PC
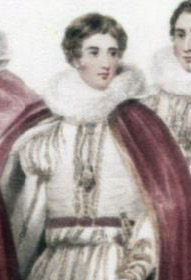
- The Earl of Rocksavage, 1821, from a portrait of the coronation of George IV

Lord Great Chamberlain of England
- In office 19 July 1830 – 20 June 1837
- Monarch: William IV
- Preceded by: Baron Willoughby de Eresby
- Succeeded by: Baron Willoughby de Eresby

Member of Parliament for Castle Rising
- In office 1817–1821

Personal details
- Born: George Horatio Cholmondeley; 16 January 1792 Paris, France
- Died: 8 May 1870 (aged 78) Cholmondeley, Cheshire
- Resting place: Malpas, Cheshire
- Party: Conservative
- Spouses: Caroline Campbell (m. 1812; died 1815) Susan Somerset (m. 1830)
- Parents: George Cholmondeley, 1st Marquess of Cholmondeley; Lady Georgiana Charlotte Bertie

George Horatio Cholmondeley, 2nd Marquess of Cholmondeley, PC (/ˈtʃʌmli/ CHUM-lee; 16 January 1792 – 8 May 1870), styled Viscount Malpas until 1815 and Earl of Rocksavage between 1815 and 1827, was a British peer and Lord Great Chamberlain of England between 1830 and 1838. Before being called to the House of Lords, he was a Tory Member of Parliament from 1817 through 1821.

== Background ==
Cholmondeley was a direct descendant of Sir Robert Walpole, the first Prime Minister of Great Britain. He was the eldest son of George James Cholmondeley, who had been created the first Marquess of Cholmondeley in 1815. His mother was the former Lady Georgiana Charlotte Bertie, second daughter and coheir of Peregrine Bertie, 3rd Duke of Ancaster and Kesteven. Lord George was educated at Eton, leaving in 1805.

He participated in the coronation of King George IV in 1821, as one of eight eldest sons of peers holding the king's train. The others were the Earl of Surrey, Marquess of Douro, Viscount Cranborne, Earl of Brecknock, Earl of Uxbridge, Earl of Rawdon, Viscount Ingestre and Lord Francis Conyngham.

== Personal life ==
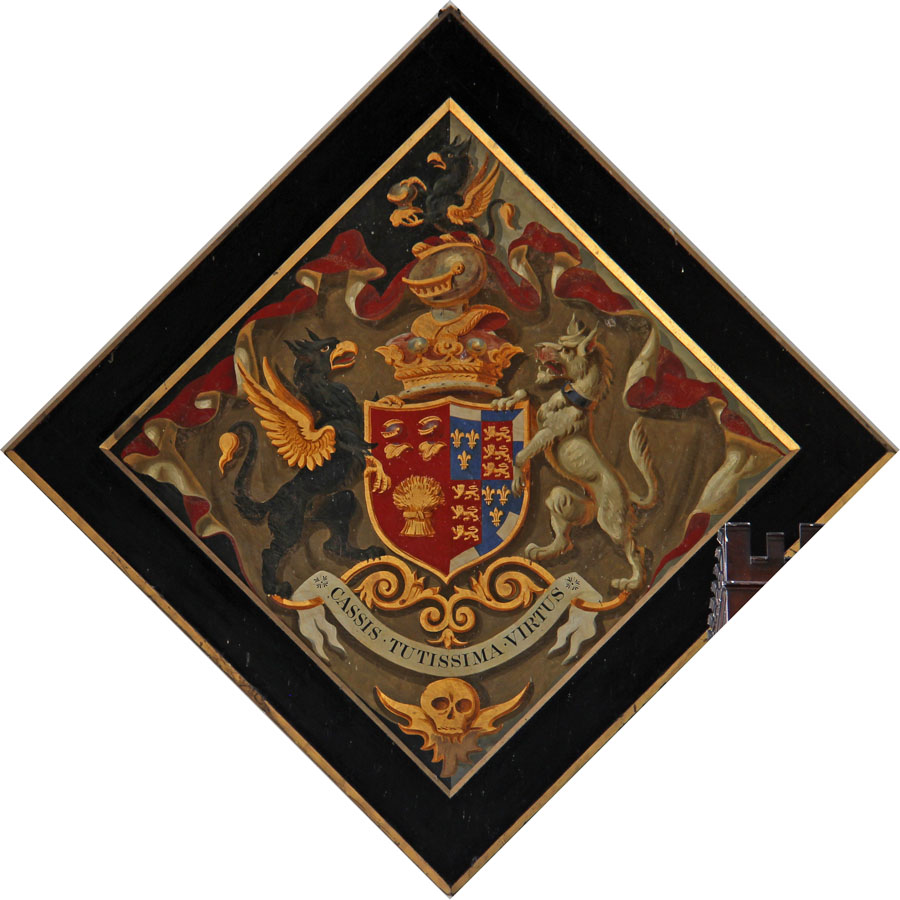
Funeral hatchment, St Martin's Church, Houghton, showing Cholmondeley impaling Somerset, for his second wife

After a brief interest in Catholicism, Cholmondeley became a devout Methodist.

Cholmondeley married Caroline Campbell, second daughter of Sir Colin Campbell, on 20 October 1812, in Gibraltar. She died, aged 20, after a "long and severe illness" on 12 October 1815.

On 11 May 1830, he married Lady Susan Caroline Somerset, fourth daughter of Henry Charles Somerset, 6th Duke of Beaufort. Both of his marriages were childless. The Dowager Marchioness Susan survived her husband by 16 years; she died in 1886.

== Career ==
In 1817, Cholmondeley was elected to the House of Commons for Castle Rising, a seat he held until 1821, when he was called to the House of Lords through a writ of acceleration in his father's junior title of Baron Newburgh. George's father stipulated that his eldest son replace him as a condition of his own resignation, to accommodate Henry Conyngham, 1st Marquess Conyngham, whose wife, Elizabeth, was the mistress of King George. Cholmondeley's younger brother, William Henry, was reportedly his father's favourite, and it was said that their father wanted his elder son out of the way "so that his second and favourite son, Lord Henry, may come into Parliament," which he did in 1822.

In 1830, Cholmondeley was admitted to the Privy Council. In addition, he held the office of Constable of Castle Rising between 1858 and 1870.

== Lands and estates ==
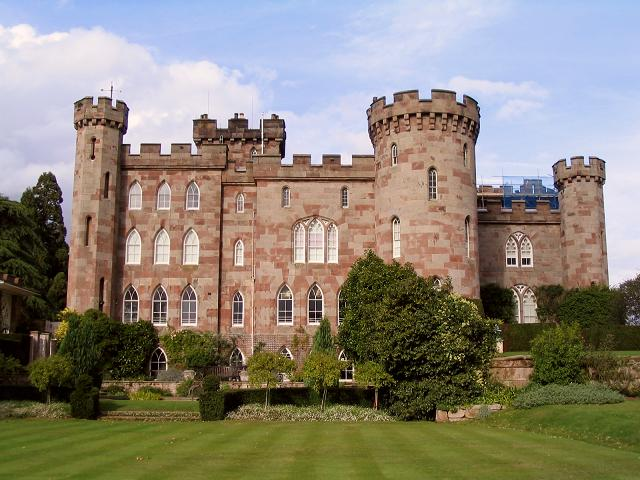
Cholmondeley Castle

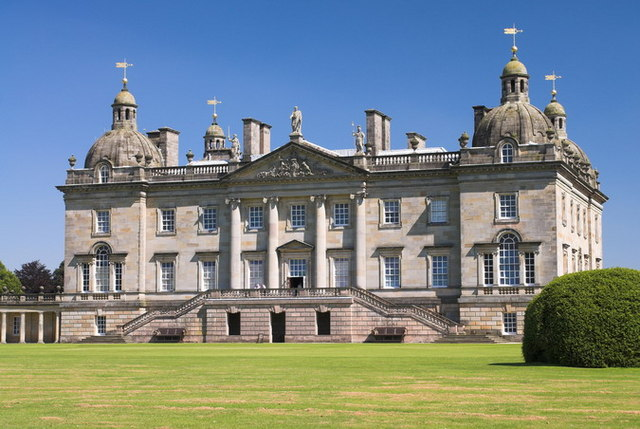
Houghton Hall

The family seats are Houghton Hall in Norfolk, and Cholmondeley Castle, which is surrounded by a 7,500 acres (30 km^{2}) estate near Malpas, Cheshire.

The 2nd Marquess died in May 1870, aged 78, and was succeeded in his lands, estates and titles by his younger brother Henry.

== Position at court ==
One moiety part of the ancient office of Lord Great Chamberlain is a Cholmondeley inheritance. This hereditary honour came into the Cholmondeley family through the marriage of the first Marquess of Cholmondeley to Lady Georgiana Charlotte Bertie, daughter of Peregrine Bertie, 3rd Duke of Ancaster and Kesteven. The second, fourth, fifth, sixth and seventh holders of the marquesate have all held this office.

== Sources ==
- Debrett, John, Charles Kidd, David Williamson. (1990). Debrett's Peerage and Baronetage. New York: Macmillan. ISBN 978-0-333-38847-1
- Lodge, Edmund. (1877). The Peerage and Baronetage of the British Empire as at Present Existing. London: Hurst and Blackett. OCLC 17221260

Parliament of the United Kingdom
Preceded by Augustus Cavendish-Bradshaw; Fulk Greville Howard	Member of Parliament for Castle Rising; 1817–1821; With: Fulk Greville Howard	Succeeded by William Cholmondeley; Fulk Greville Howard
Court offices
Preceded by The Lord Willoughby de Eresby	Lord Great Chamberlain; 1830–1837	Succeeded by The Lord Willoughby de Eresby
Peerage of the United Kingdom
Preceded by George James Cholmondeley	Marquess of Cholmondeley; 1827–1870	Succeeded by William Cholmondeley
Peerage of Great Britain
Preceded by George Cholmondeley	Baron Newburgh (writ in acceleration); 1821–1870	Succeeded by William Cholmondeley
