= Jane Heathcote-Drummond-Willoughby, 28th Baroness Willoughby de Eresby =

English peeress (born 1934)

The Right Honourable The Baroness Willoughby de Eresby DStJ DL
- Born: Hon. Nancy Jane Marie Heathcote-Drummond-Willoughby; 1 December 1934 (age 91); Westminster, London
- Parents: James Heathcote-Drummond-Willoughby, 3rd Earl of Ancaster (father); Nancy Phyllis Louise Astor (mother)
- Relatives: Gilbert Heathcote-Drummond-Willoughby, 2nd Earl of Ancaster (grandfather); Waldorf Astor, 2nd Viscount Astor (grandfather); Nancy Astor, Viscountess Astor (grandmother)

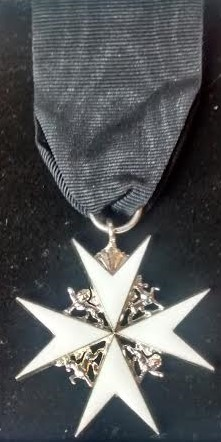
OStJ insignia

Nancy Jane Marie Heathcote-Drummond-Willoughby, 28th Baroness Willoughby de Eresby DStJ, DL (/ˈwɪləbi ˈdɪərzbi/ WIL-ə-bee DEERZ-bee; born 1 December 1934), is a British aristocratic landowner related to the Astor family and former member of the House of Lords.

Lady Willoughby de Eresby holds a one-quarter interest in the ancient hereditary office of Lord Great Chamberlain, currently held by the 7th Baron Carrington.

== Family ==
Lady Willoughby de Eresby was born at 26 Queen Anne's Gate, Westminster. The only daughter of James Heathcote-Drummond-Willoughby, 3rd Earl of Ancaster KCVO TD, and the Hon. Nancy Phyllis Louise Astor (daughter of Waldorf Astor, 2nd Viscount Astor). Her only brother, Timothy Gilbert Heathcote-Drummond-Willoughby (born 19 March 1936), styled Lord Willoughby de Eresby from 1951 as heir to the Earldom of Ancaster, was lost at sea in 1963.

== Adult life ==
Lady Jane Willoughby was one of the six Maids of Honour at the 1953 coronation of Queen Elizabeth II.

Her father was the third and last Earl of Ancaster. On his death in 1983, the earldom became extinct, but according to the remainder of ancient baronies by writ of summons, Lady Jane Heathcote-Drummond-Willoughby succeeded as Baroness Willoughby de Eresby. She became the sixth woman to hold the barony, which is distinguished by its territorial designation from that of Willoughby de Broke.

Lady Willoughby also inherited 75,000 acres (300 km^{2}) divided between Lincolnshire and Perthshire and in 2008 was ranked 1,572nd in a list of richest people forming the annual report of the Sunday Times, citing her wealth as £48 million. The annual report includes domiciled and non-domiciled visitors believed to be in the United Kingdom at the start of each year. Her father left net assets subjected to tax to his heirs on his death attested as £1,486,694 (equivalent to £5 million in 2019), but may have transferred assets before his death.

In 1987, she became a patron of King Edward VI School in Spilsby. A Deputy Lieutenant for Lincolnshire (1993–2009), Lady Willoughby was appointed an Officer of the Order of St John in 2000. On 28 April 2000 she was appointed as Dame of the Most Venerable Order of the Hospital of Saint John of Jerusalem. She also served as a Trustee of the National Portrait Gallery from 1994 until 2004.

Like most other hereditary peers, Lady Willoughby lost the right to sit in the House of Lords following the House of Lords Act 1999 but did not seek to become one of the ninety elected hereditary peers. However, the office of Lord Great Chamberlain carries with it an ex officio seat in the House of Lords, although the quarter-share means that she is only a Joint Hereditary Lord Great Chamberlain, with the possibility of holding the office in every fourth monarch's reign; her relevant family tree back to 1789 features in this regard, as the office was split by decision of the House of Lords between the daughters of Robert Bertie, 4th Duke of Ancaster and Kesteven (also Marquess of Lindsey and Lord Willoughby de Eresby).

In a 2023 episode of BBC Television's Who Do You Think You Are?, Lord Lloyd-Webber discovered at Grimsthorpe Castle that he shares ancestry with Lady Willoughby, as his 12-times great-grandmother was Katherine Willoughby, Duchess of Suffolk at the time of Henry VIII.

== Heirs ==
Lady Willoughby de Eresby is unmarried and has no issue. Thus the co-heirs presumptive to her peerage title are Lieutenant Colonel Sebastian St Maur Miller (born 1965), grandson of her elder aunt, and Sir James John Aird, 5th Baronet (born 1978), grandson of her younger aunt, who share equally Lady Willoughby de Eresby's quarter-interest in the hereditary office of Lord Great Chamberlain. The Cholmondeleys assume the role in every second reign, so the Marquess will have the next turn as Lord Great Chamberlain. After that, the Willoughby de Eresby share in the office will take its turn.

== See also ==
- Drummond Castle
- Grimsthorpe Castle

== Bibliography ==
- Charles Mosley, ed. (2003). Burke's Peerage, Baronetage & Knightage. Vol. III (107th ed.). Wilmington, Delaware. p. 4196. ISBN 0-9711966-2-1.

Peerage of England
| Preceded by Gilbert James Heathcote-Drummond-Willoughby; 3rd Earl of Ancaster | Baroness Willoughby de Eresby; 1983–present | Succeeded by Co-heirs |
