= Mary Bertie, Duchess of Ancaster and Kesteven =

British courtier (1730–1793)

Her Grace The Duchess of Ancaster and Kesteven
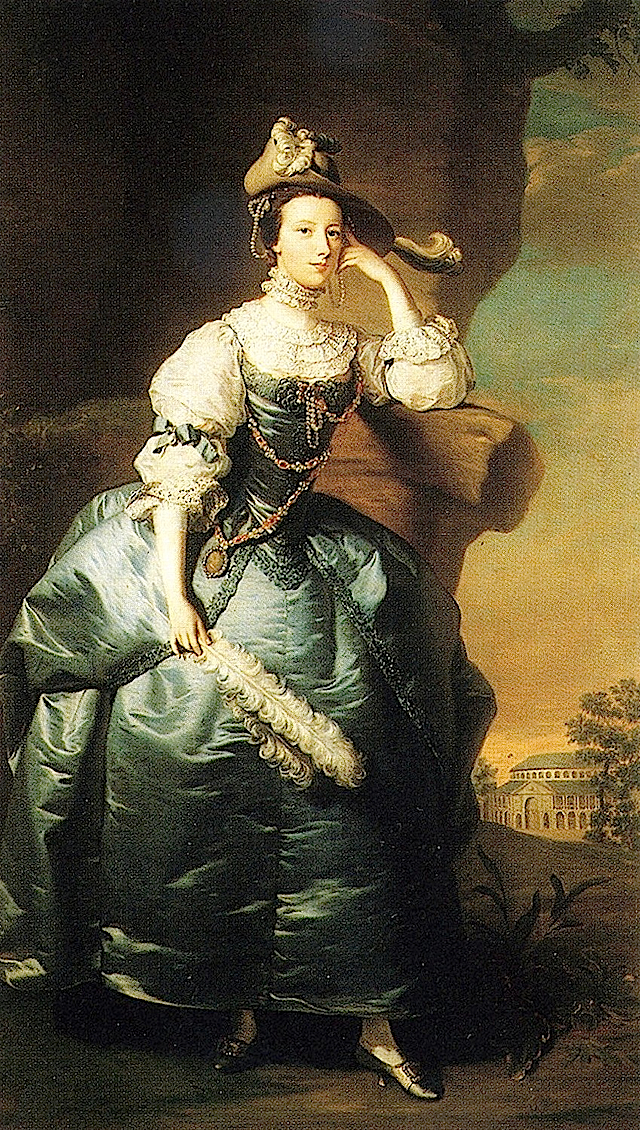
- Mary Bertie, Duchess of Ancaster and Kesteven, by Thomas Hudson
- Born: Mary Panton; 1730
- Died: October 19, 1793 (aged 62–63); Italy
- Noble family: Panton
- Spouse: Peregrine Bertie, 3rd Duke of Ancaster and Kesteven
- Issue: Lady Mary Catherine Bertie; Peregrine Thomas Bertie, Marquess of Lindsey; Robert Bertie, 4th Duke of Ancaster and Kesteven; Priscilla Bertie, 21st Baroness Willoughby de Eresby; Georgiana Cholmondeley, Marchioness of Cholmondeley
- Father: Thomas Panton
- Mother: Priscilla
- Occupation: Mistress of the Robes to Queen Charlotte

Mary Bertie, Duchess of Ancaster and Kesteven (1730–19 October 1793), formerly Mary Panton, was a British courtier.

She was the second wife of Peregrine Bertie, 3rd Duke of Ancaster and Kesteven. She was the daughter of Thomas Panton of Newmarket (1697–1782), who was an equerry to King George II and master of the Thurlow Hunt, and his wife Priscilla (though she may have been illegitimate).

The duke's first wife, Elizabeth Blundell, died in 1743. Mary Panton married the duke on 27 November 1750. They had six children:

- Lady Mary Catherine Bertie (14 April 1754 – 12 April 1767)
- Peregrine Thomas Bertie, Marquess of Lindsey (21 May 1755 – 12 December 1758)
- An unnamed son, who was born and died on 14 September 1759
- Robert Bertie, 4th Duke of Ancaster and Kesteven (1756–1779)
- Priscilla Barbara Elizabeth Bertie, Baroness Willoughby de Eresby (16 February 1761 – 29 December 1828)
- Lady Georgina Charlotte Bertie (7 August 1764 – 1838), married George Cholmondeley, 1st Marquess of Cholmondeley and had children.

Following her marriage to the duke, Mary Panton's father Thomas obtained the post of Master of the King's Running Horses, and his son, also Thomas, later inherited this position.

In 1757, Sir Joshua Reynolds painted the couple, and another portrait by Reynolds of the duchess was painted between 1765 and 1771. A watercolour miniature, by John Smart, dating to 1763, is held by the Nelson-Atkins Museum of Art.

From 1761 to 1793, the duchess held the position of Mistress of the Robes to Charlotte of Mecklenburg-Strelitz, Queen Charlotte. She, alongside the Duchess of Hamilton and Elizabeth Howard, Countess of Effingham, were the first three ladies-in-waiting to be appointed to the new queen upon the royal wedding in 1761, and attended to her when she travelled and arrived to England, and during her wedding and coronation. On the birth of the future King William IV of the United Kingdom in 1762, the duchess recommended as wet-nurse a woman called Sarah Tuting, who was later acknowledged as her father's mistress.

The duchess died in Italy.

== Portraits of Mary Bertie, Duchess of Ancaster ==
John Dixon - Lady Mary Catharine Bertie - B1970.3.590 - Yale Center for British Art

Mary, Duchess of Ancaster and Kesteven, née Panton (d. 1793) (miniature by John Smart)

Mary Panton, Duchess of Ancaster, after Joshua Reynolds by Richard Houston (Bibliothèque nationale de France )

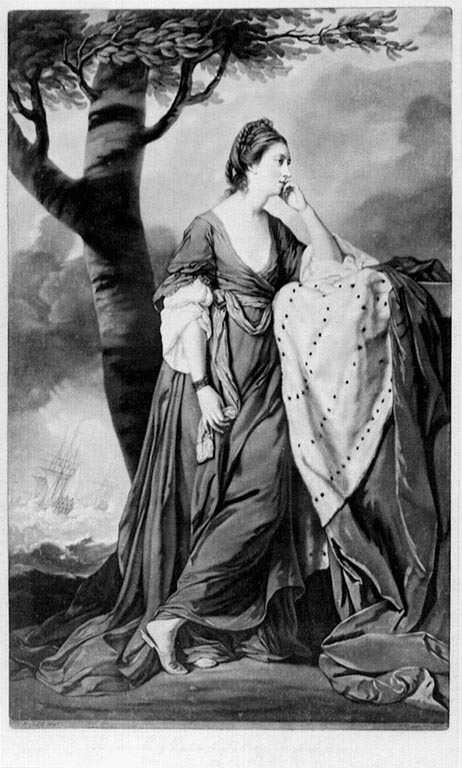
Mary, Duchess of Ancaster and Kesteven, after Sir Joshua Reynolds by John Dixon (Government Art Collection # 10041)

Duchess of Ancaster, watchpaper engraved by John June after published by John Smith of Cheapside, circa 1770 (British Museum )

Duchess of Ancaster, watchpaper pub Robert Sayer (1775 catalogue no 18) after John Taylor after Joshua Reynolds (Grosvenor Prints, London )

Court offices
Preceded by Henrietta Howard, Countess of Suffolk	Mistress of the Robes to Queen Charlotte; 1761–1793	Succeeded by Elizabeth Thynne, Marchioness of Bath
