= Peter Drummond-Burrell, 22nd Baron Willoughby de Eresby =

British politician and nobleman

The Right Honourable The Lord Willoughby de Eresby PC
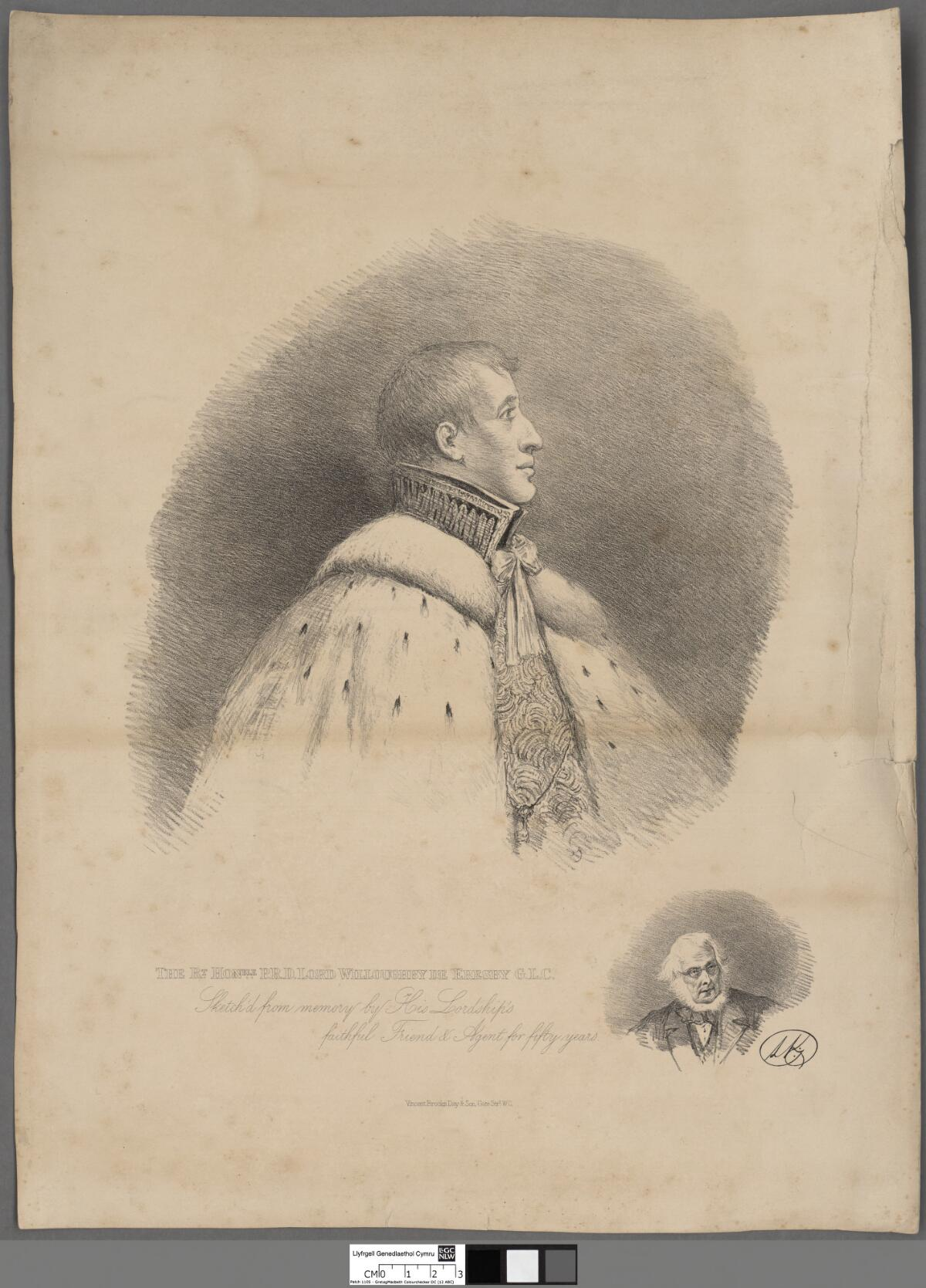
- Lithograph from around 1830

Member of Parliament for Boston
- In office 1812–1820
- Preceded by: William Madocks; Thomas Fydell
- Succeeded by: Henry Ellis; Gilbert Heathcote

Personal details
- Born: Peter Robert Burrell; 19 March 1782
- Died: 22 February 1865 (aged 82)
- Party: Whig, Tories
- Spouse: Sarah Clementina Drummond (m. 1807; died 1865)
- Relations: Peter Burrell (grandfather); Peregrine Bertie, 3rd Duke of Ancaster and Kesteven (grandfather)
- Parent(s): Peter Burrell, 1st Baron Gwydyr; Priscilla Bertie, 21st Baroness Willoughby de Eresby

Peter Robert Drummond-Burrell, 2nd Baron Gwydyr, 22nd Baron Willoughby de Eresby PC (19 March 1782 – 22 February 1865), was a British politician and nobleman.

== Early life ==
Born Peter Robert Burrell, he was the eldest of three sons born to Peter Burrell, 1st Baron Gwydyr (1754–1820), and Priscilla Bertie, 21st Baroness Willoughby de Eresby (1761–1828). His paternal grandfather was Peter Burrell, a Member of Parliament and Surveyor General of the Land Revenues of the Crown, and his maternal grandfather was Peregrine Bertie, 3rd Duke of Ancaster and Kesteven. His mother succeeded to a large part of the Ancaster estates in 1779, to the barony of Willoughby of Eresby in 1780 and to the hereditary office of Lord Great Chamberlain.

== Career ==
He was educated at St John's College, Cambridge, graduating M.A. 1801. From 1812 until 1820, he was Member of Parliament for Boston in Lincolnshire. Up to the 1832 Reform Act Drummond-Burrell was a Whig, but by 1841 had changed his allegiance to the Tories.

On 29 June 1820, he succeeded his father as 2nd Baron Gwydyr, 3rd Baronet Burell of Knipp and Deputy Lord Great Chamberlain. On 29 December 1828, he succeeded his mother as 22nd Baron Willoughby de Eresby and joint (1/2) hereditary Lord Great Chamberlain.

As hereditary Lord Great Chamberlain, he played a leading role at the coronation of Queen Victoria in 1838, holding the crown.

== Personal life ==
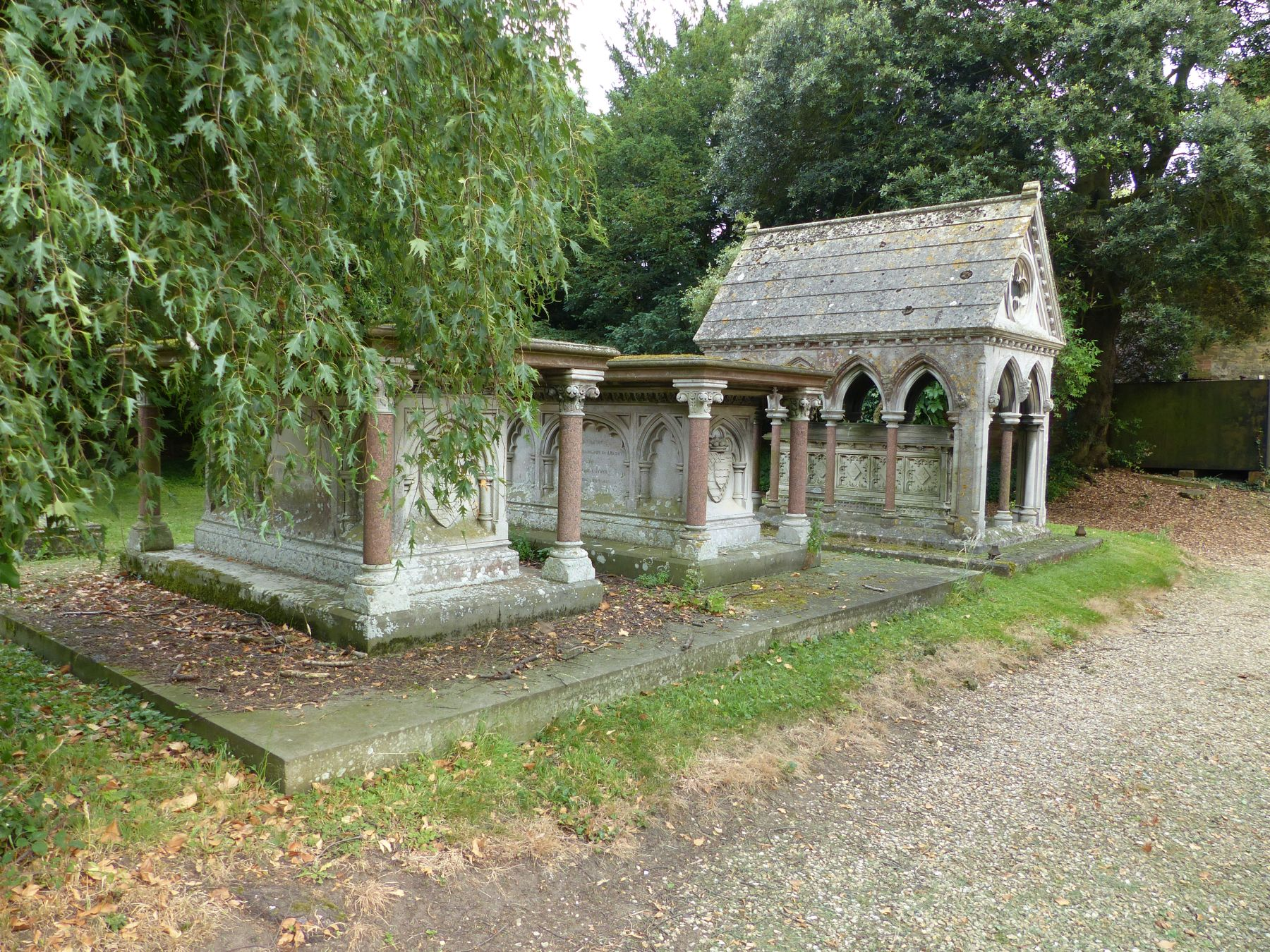
Tomb, alongside that of his wife, and second daughter, behind the Church of St Michael and All Angels, Edenham, Lincolnshire

On 19 October 1807, he married Sarah Clementina Drummond (1786–1865), daughter of James Drummond, 11th Earl of Perth, and Clementina Elphinstone (a daughter of Charles Elphinstone, 10th Lord Elphinstone). Together, they were the parents of five children:

- Clementina Elizabeth Drummond-Willoughby, 24th Baroness Willoughby de Eresby (1809–1882). who married Sir Gilbert John Heathcote, 1st Baron Aveland.
- Elizabeth Susan Drummond-Burrell (1810–1853), who died unmarried.
- Charlotte Augusta Annabella Drummond-Willoughby (1815–1879), who married the Robert Carrington, 2nd Baron Carrington.
- Frederick Drummond-Burrell (1818–1819), who died in infancy.
- Albyric Drummond-Willoughby, 23rd Baron Willoughby de Eresby (1821–1870), who never married.

His wife died on 26 January 1865. He died less than a month later, on 22 February 1865. They are buried side by side in the churchyard of St Michael and All Angels, Edenham, Lincolnshire. The canopied tomb of their second daughter, Elizabeth Susan (d. 1853) is adjacent, and those of their son Albyric (d. 1870) and grandson Gilbert Heathcote-Drummond-Willoughby, 1st Earl of Ancaster (d. 1910), are nearby. All five tombs are Grade II listed, some jointly.

=== Legacy ===
Gwydyr Mansions in Hove, East Sussex, were named after him in honour of his friendship with the Goldsmid family, upon whose land the development was built in 1890.

The Gwydir River in New South Wales was named for him by the explorer Allan Cunningham, for whom he was a patron.

Parliament of the United Kingdom
Preceded by William Madocks; Thomas Fydell	Member of Parliament for Boston; 1812–1820; With: William Madocks	Succeeded by Henry Ellis; Gilbert Heathcote
Court offices
Preceded by The Lord Gwydyr as Deputy	Lord Great Chamberlain; Acting; 1821–1828	Succeeded by Himself
Preceded by Himself as Deputy	Lord Great Chamberlain; 1828–1830	Succeeded by The Marquess of Cholmondeley as Deputy
Preceded by The Marquess of Cholmondeley as Deputy	Lord Great Chamberlain; 1837–1865	Succeeded by The 23rd Lord Willoughby de Eresby
Honorary titles
Preceded by Thomas Assheton Smith	Lord Lieutenant of Caernarvonshire; 1828–1851	Succeeded by Sir Richard Williams-Bulkeley, Bt
Peerage of England
Preceded by Priscilla Bertie	Baron Willoughby de Eresby; 1828–1865	Succeeded by Albyric Drummond-Willoughby
Peerage of Great Britain
Preceded by Peter Burrell	Baron Gwydyr; 1820–1865	Succeeded by Albyric Drummond-Willoughby
