= Thomas Panton =

English racehorse owner (1731–1808)

Thomas Panton (1731 – 29 November 1808) was an English racehorse owner.

He was the son of Thomas Panton (1697–1782), master of the king's running-horses at Newmarket, Suffolk. A sister, Mary, married in 1750 Peregrine Bertie, 3rd Duke of Ancaster and Kesteven.

Thomas Panton the younger lived as a country gentleman at Fen Ditton in Cambridgeshire. He was an unsuccessful parliamentary candidate for Cambridgeshire after the death in 1770 of John Manners, Marquess of Granby. He was Sheriff of Cambridgeshire and Huntingdonshire in 1789.

His chief reputation was gained as an owner of racehorses; he was a member of the Jockey Club in 1753, within a few years of its foundation, and figured conspicuously on the turf until his death. Charles Pigott, in his satire The Jockey Club (1792) could find no harm to say of him, describing him a "truly well-bred, agreeable, good-humoured man".

Panton won the Epsom Derby in 1786 with his horse Noble. He died on 29 November 1808 in Newmarket.
