= Priscilla Bertie, 21st Baroness Willoughby de Eresby =

The Right Honourable The Baroness Willoughby de Eresby
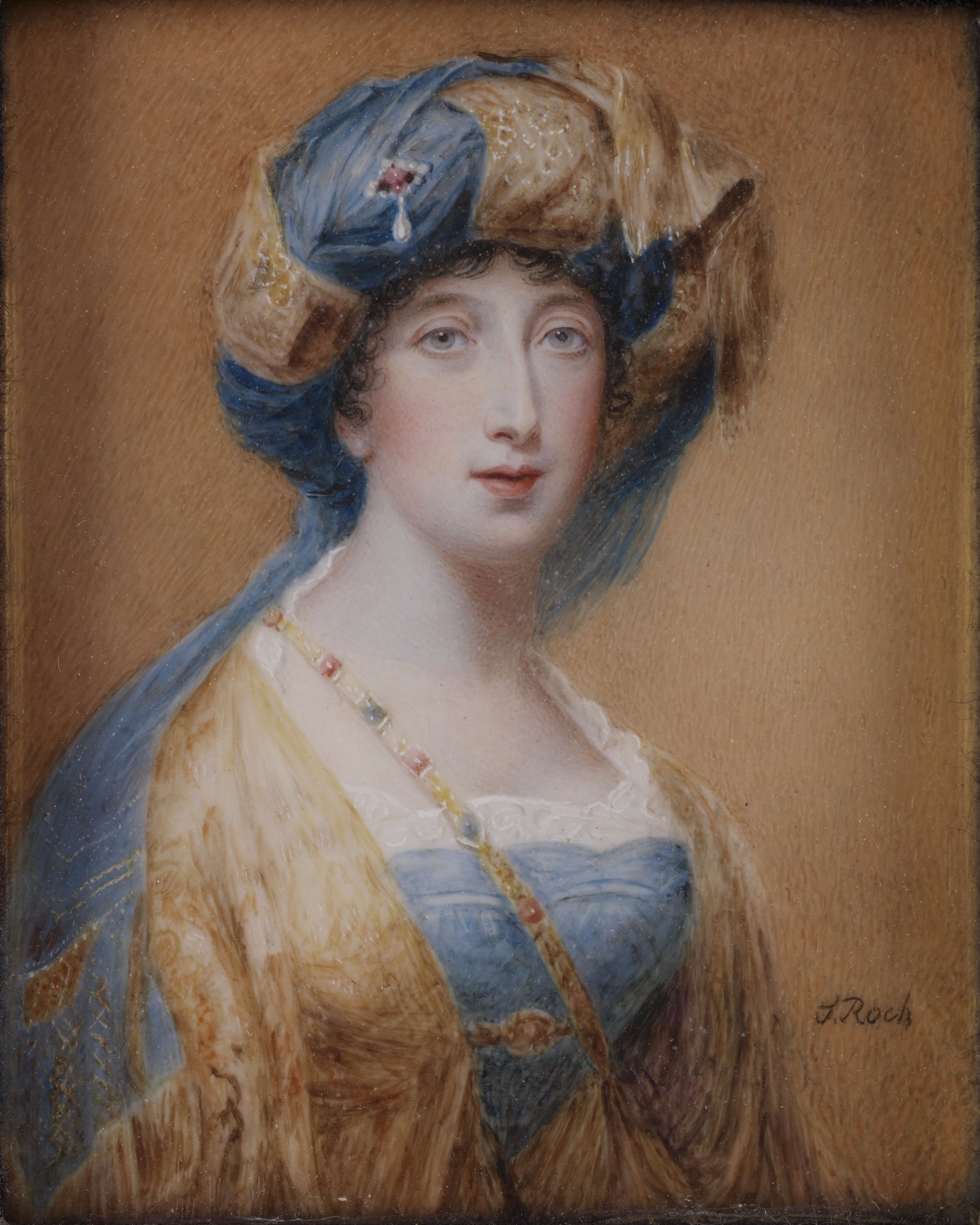
- Lady Willoughby de Eresby by Sampson Towgood Roch, after a miniature by Saunders c. 1810

Personal details
- Born: Lady Priscilla Barbara Elizabeth Bertie; 16 February 1761
- Died: 29 December 1828 (aged 67)
- Spouse: Peter Burrell, 1st Baron Gwydyr (m. 1779; died 1820)
- Children: Peter Drummond-Burrell, 22nd Baron Willoughby de Eresby; Hon. Lindsey Burrell; Hon. William Burrell; Elizabeth FitzGibbon, Countess of Clare
- Parents: Peregrine Bertie, 3rd Duke of Ancaster and Kesteven; Mary Panton

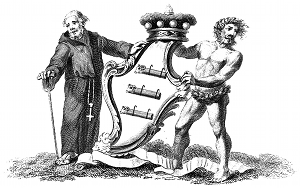
Arms of Baroness Willoughby de Eresby

Priscilla Barbara Elizabeth Bertie, 21st Baroness Willoughby de Eresby (16 February 1761 – 29 December 1828), known before 1780 as Lady Priscilla Bertie, was a daughter of the Peregrine Bertie, 3rd Duke of Ancaster and Kesteven, and Mary Panton. Through her grandmother Mary Wynn, Priscilla Bertie was a descendant of the Welsh princely House of Aberffraw.

On 23 February 1779, she married Sir Peter Burrell (later 1st Baron Gwydyr) and they later had four children.

== Barony of Willoughby de Eresby ==
On 8 July 1779, her brother, Robert Bertie, 4th Duke of Ancaster and Kesteven, died of scarlet fever at the age of 22 and his dukedom passed to his uncle, but his barony of Willoughby de Eresby, as well as the office of Lord Great Chamberlain, went into abeyance between Priscilla and her sister, Lady Georgiana (later Marchioness of Cholmondeley). On 17 March 1780, however, the abeyance of the barony was terminated in Priscilla's favour, as the elder sister. The office of Lord Great Chamberlain remains divided.

== Marriage and children ==
- Peter Robert Drummond-Burrell, 22nd Lord Willoughby de Eresby (12 March 1782 – 22 February 1865)
- Hon. Lindsey Merrick Peter Burrell (20 June 1786 – 1 January 1848); married Frances Daniell on 13 July 1807 and had issue.
- Hon. William Peregrine Peter Burrell (1 October 1788 – 27 July 1852); died unmarried.
- Hon. Elizabeth Julia Georgiana Burrell (25 March 1793 – 30 April 1879); married John FitzGibbon, 2nd Earl of Clare, on 14 April 1826.

Peerage of England
| Preceded by Robert Bertie (abeyant in 1779) | Baroness Willoughby de Eresby (abeyance terminated); 1780–1828 | Succeeded by Peter Drummond-Burrell |
