= Diederich Wessel Linden =

Diederich Wessel Linden (fl. 1745–1768; d. 1769) was an early specialist on mining and the medicinal uses of mineral waters in Britain, particularly in Wales.

== Childhood in Germany ==
Diederich Wessel Linden was possibly born in Hemmerde, Westphalia, in the early eighteenth century. He received some schooling and was familiar with the foundations of mining and mineralogy. Although he called himself a medical doctor and physician later in life, there is no evidence that he held any university degree.

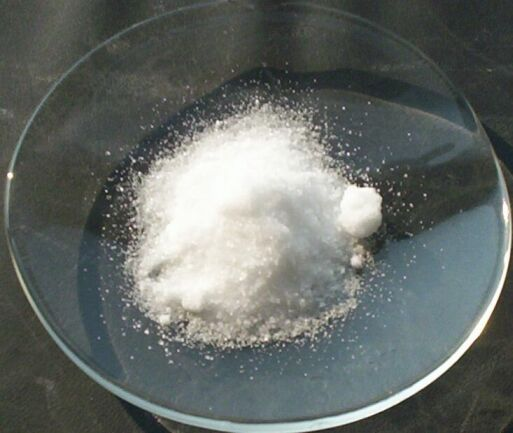
Potassium nitrate or, how it was more commonly referred to in the eighteenth century, saltpetre.

== Emigration to and early years in Britain ==
Linden emigrated to Britain in 1742 and initially settled in London where he worked as a physician and pharmaceutical instructor. There, he published Gründliche historische Nachricht vom Theer-Wasser (1745), a German adaptation of a study by George Berkeley (1685–1753). In April 1746, Linden was granted a 14-year patent for the exclusive production of saltpetre based on his own, unique method.

Linden's first attempt at naturalisation in 1746 failed as his Bill was presented to the House of Lords, but did not progress any further. He only became a naturalised citizen in 1762 through a Private Act signed by King George III. By late 1747, Linden plunged so much into debt that he was committed to Fleet Prison on 20 January 1747, but already in spring he was released and moved to Holywell, Wales.

== Life in Wales and first publications on mineral waters ==
By summer 1747, Linden had gained leases from two business men in Chester and Holywell, to develop mines at Caerwys and Prestatyn. Anglicising his first name to 'Diederick', it is around this time that he published a pamphlet on mining, A Letter to William Hooson, a Derbyshire Miner (1747), in which he attacked the author, William Hooson, on a personal and professional level. This, in return, drew ire from other contemporaries such as Lewis Morris and Thomas Pennant, who criticised Linden's methodology and conclusions. Undeterred, Linden continued writing about mining and published Three letters on Mining and Smelting (1750), which was also translated into French as Lettres sur la Minéralogie et Métallurgie pratiques (1752).

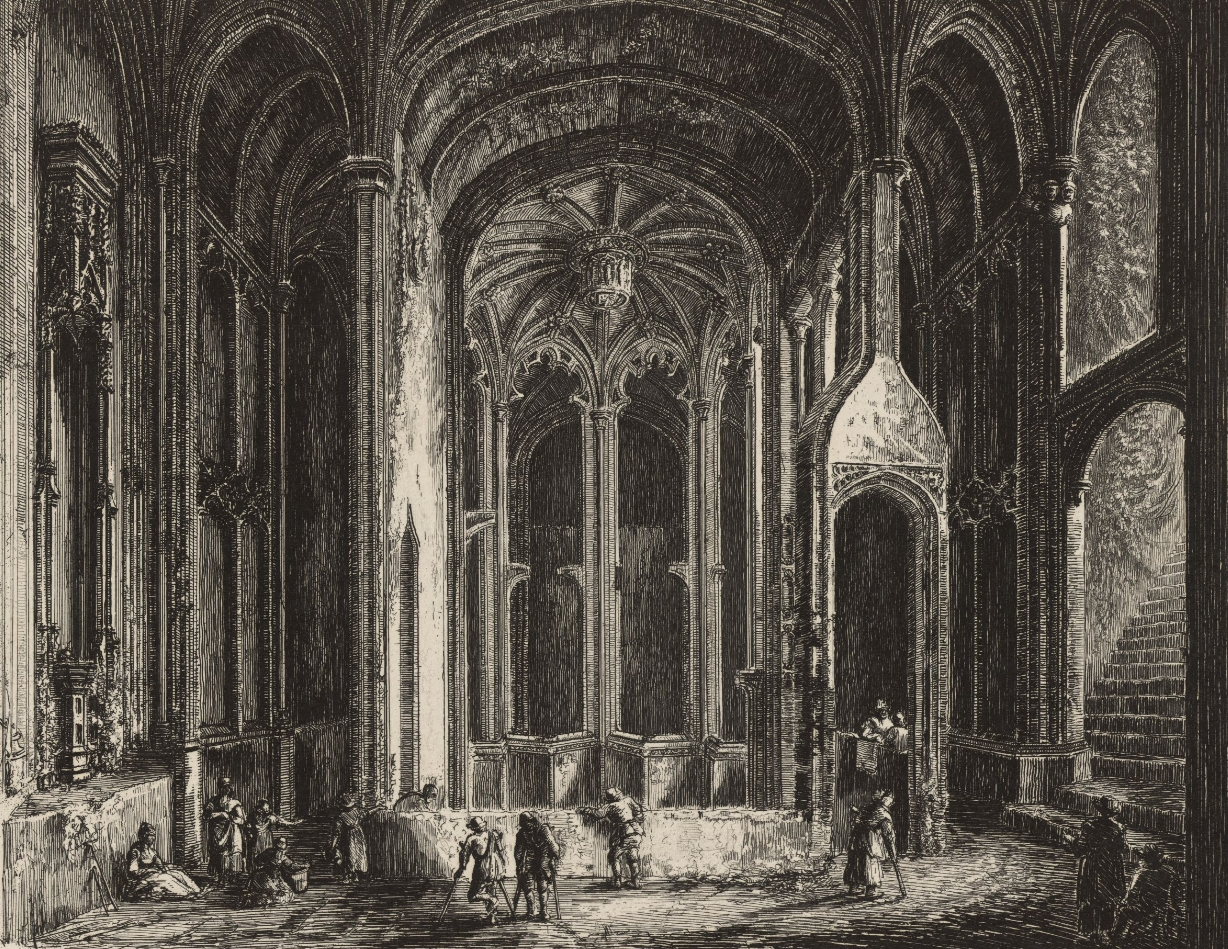
Linden studied the medical properties of St Winefride's Well before the development of mining works in the area.

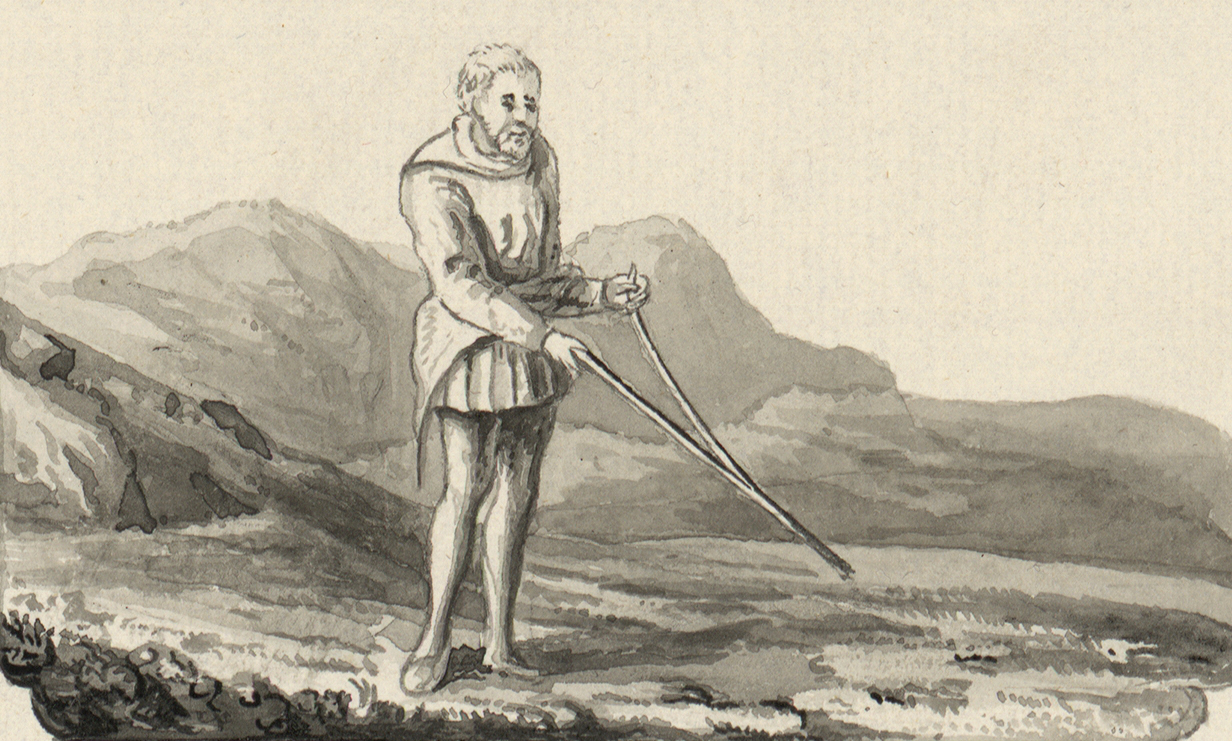
This illustration of a prospector with a dousing rod appears in the personal edition of Thomas Pennant's Tour in Wales in the section where he discusses the dubious methods employed by Linden. This image is based on an original woodcut illustration showing a prospector for ores in Georgius Agricola’s treatise De re metallica (1556).

The majority of Linden's writing was about the properties and medicinal uses of mineral waters, such as A Treatise on the Origin, Nature, and Virtues of Chalybeat Waters, and Natural Hot Baths (1748) and Treatise on the Three Medicinal Mineral Waters at Llandrindod, in Radnorshire, South Wales (1754). These publications cemented Linden's reputation among his British readership as an expert in this area.

In the 1750s, Peregrine Bertie, third Duke of Ancaster (1714–1778) engaged Linden as an adviser to develop several of the estate's mining interests in the upper Conwy Valley, chiefly in the vicinity of Trefriw. Subsequently, Linden left Holywell first for Llanrwst and later to Brecon where he set up a medical practice and also became a member of the Brecknockshire Agricultural Society, the first of its kind in Wales. Through his membership, he also struck up a friendship with one of its founders, Hywel Harris, Trevecka. In April 1759, four men separately accused Linden of physical assault 'with an intent [of] that most horrid detestable and abominable Crime of amongst Christians not to be named, called Buggery', but all four accusations were dismissed by the Court of Great Sessions.

== Final years and publications ==
After 1760, Linden's locations become uncertain, and it is unclear whether he had a permanent address. He continued publishing and writing letters concerning treatments with mineral waters, albeit at diminished pace, and undertook a correspondence with Emanuel Mendes da Costa (1717–1791), a Fellow of the Royal Society and the Society of Antiquaries. Occasionally, he would accompany clients to take the waters at Bristol or other spas, a habit which later resulted in a satirical character portrait in the novel The Expedition of Humphry Clinker (1771) by Tobias Smollett (1721–1771). He also continued publishing about mineral waters, namely An Experimental and Practical Enquiry into the Opthalmic, Antiscrophulous, and Nervous Properties of the Mineral Water of Llangybi, in Carnarvonshire (1767), which was posthumously published in a condensed Welsh edition as Hanes ferr o gynnedfau meddyginiaethawl dyfroedd Llangybi (1771).

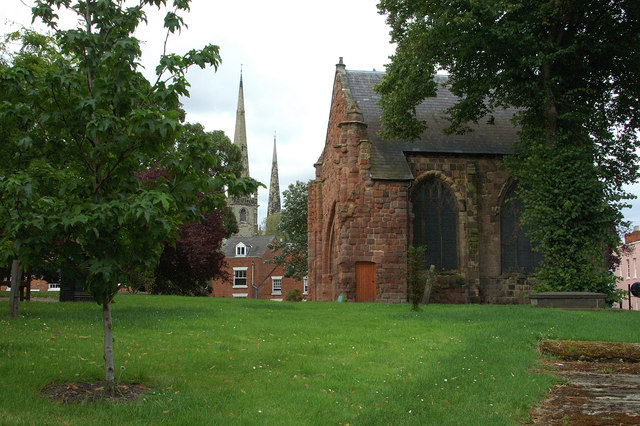
Diederich Wessel Linden was buried in Old St Chad's graveyard before the collapse of the church and abandonment of the graveyard for a new location.

By 1767, Linden had settled in or near Shrewsbury from where he published his final book, A Medicinal and Experimental History and Analysis of the Hanlys-Spa Saline, Purging and Chalybeate Waters, near Shrewsbury, etc (1768). A year later he died in Shrewsbury under unknown circumstances and was buried at Old St Chad's on 25 August 1769.

== Works ==
- Gründliche historische Nachricht vom Theer-Wasser, dessen herrlichen medicinischen Tugenden, Zubereitung und Gebrauch und auf was Art diese vortreffliche Artzney zuerst von Amerika nach Irland übergebracht, daselbst in vielen Kranckheiten mit grossem nutzen versucht, und zum allgemeinen Besten bekannt gemacht worden sey (1745)
- Gründliche chemische Anmerkungen über Herrn D. Schüttens Physicalische Nachricht vom Ursprunge der mineralischen Wasser und den Bestand-Theilen in dem Clevischen Sauer-Brunnen-Wasser; wie auch über des Herrn von Welling Opus Mago-Cabbalisticum, und was von dessen Verbesserung der Metalle zu halten sey (1746)
- A letter to Dr. Peter Shaw, concerning a very useful discovery and considerable improvement in the black epileptical powder, (Pulvis epilepticus niger) (1746)
- A Letter to William Hooson, a Derbyshire Miner: Shewing the Mistakes, and Errors, Committed in His Lately Publish'd Miners Dictionary. With a Preface Setting forth the Reasons for Making the Said Publick (1747)
- A Treatise on the Origin, Nature, and Virtues of Chalybeat Waters, and Natural Hot Baths. With a Description of several Mineral Waters in England and in Germany. Likewise, Directions for the Preparation and Use of Artificial, Hot, Mineral-Water-Baths. To which is added, and Appendix on the Selter Water with Many Remarks, especially on its Mixture with Tar-Water. And also a Dissertaion on Baron Schwanberg’s Liquid Shell; With the Process, for Preparing the Same. To which Is Annexed, Occasional Remarks and Queries on the Glastonbury Waters (1748; 1752)
- Directions for [the use] of that extraordinary mineral-water, commonly called, Berry's Shadwell-Spaw, in Sun-Tavern-Fields, Shadwell, near London (1749)
- An experimental dissertation on the nature, contents, and virtues of the Hyde saline purging water, commonly called the Hyde Spaw, near Cheltenham in Gloucestershire (1751)
- Three Letters on Mining and Smelting; in which a Method is Laid Down, whereby These Useful Sciences May Be Greatly Improved. To which Is Added, a Fourth Letter; Setting Forth, a Discovery of an Easy Method to Secure Ships Bottoms from Worms (1750)
- Lettres sur la Minéralogie et Métallurgie pratiques (1752)
- A Treatise on the Three Medical Mineral Waters at Llandrindod, in Radnorshire, South Wales with some Remarks in Mineral and Fossil Mixtures, in Their Native Veins and Beds; At Least as Far as Respects Their Influence on Water (1754; 1756)
- An Experimental and Practical Enquiry into the Opthalmic, Antiscrophulous, and Nervous Properties of the Mineral Water of Llangybi, in Carnarvonshire. To which Is Annexed, an Essay on the Prize Question, Proposed by the Royal Academy of Bourdeaux, For the Year 1767, on the Subject of Analizing Mineral Waters (1767)
- A Medicinal and Experimental History and Analysis of the Hanlys-Spa Saline, Purging and Chalybeate Waters, near Shrewsbury, etc (1768)
- Hanes ferr o gynnedfau meddyginiaethawl dyfroedd Llangybi; A elwir yn gyffredin Ffynnon Gybi, yn agos i Bwllheil, yn Sir Gaernarfon; oddi wrth amryw brofiadau a wynaethpwyd o honynt yn y Fwyddyn 1766 (1771)
