= Peter Burrell, 1st Baron Gwydyr =

British politician (1754–1820)

The Right Honourable The Lord Gwydyr Bt PC

Member of Parliament for Haslemere
- In office 1776–1780 Serving with Sir Merrik Burrell, Bt
- Preceded by: Thomas More Molyneux; Sir Merrick Burrell, Bt
- Succeeded by: Sir James Lowther, Bt; Edward Norton

Member of Parliament for Boston
- In office 1782–1796 Serving with Humphrey Sibthorp (1782–1784); Dalhousie Watherston (1784–1790); Thomas Fydell (1790–1796)
- Preceded by: Lord Robert Bertie; Humphrey Sibthorp
- Succeeded by: Thomas Fydell; Viscount Milsington

Personal details
- Born: 16 June 1754
- Died: 29 June 1820 (aged 66)
- Spouse: Priscilla Bertie (m. 1779)
- Children: 4
- Parent: Peter Burrell (father)
- Relatives: Elizabeth Burrell (sister); Robert Bertie (brother-in-law); Peregrine Bertie (father-in-law); Merrik Burrell (great uncle); Peter Robert Drummond-Burrell (son)
- Education: Eton College
- Alma mater: St John's College, Cambridge

Peter Burrell, 1st Baron Gwydyr PC (16 June 1754 – 29 June 1820) featured in English politics at the end of the 18th century, but he was best known for his involvement in cricket, particularly his part in the foundation of Marylebone Cricket Club in 1787.

He was the son of Peter Burrell and educated at Eton College and St John's College, Cambridge.

== Career ==
He was elected Member of Parliament for Haslemere from 1776 to 1780 and for Boston from 1782 to 1796.

He married in 1779, Lady Priscilla Barbara Elizabeth Bertie, the daughter of Peregrine Bertie, 3rd Duke of Ancaster and Kesteven. She succeeded to a large part of the Ancaster estates in 1779, to the barony of Willoughby of Eresby in 1780 and to the hereditary office of Lord Great Chamberlain. Burrell was knighted in 1781 and became her deputy.

The highlight of his career was his role as Deputy Lord Great Chamberlain, jure uxoris, in the famous trial of Warren Hastings. Hastings had been the first Governor-General of India from 1773 to 1786, but in 1787 he was impeached and subsequently tried for corruption, but was acquitted in 1795.

He succeeded his father in 1775 and his great-uncle, Sir Merrik Burrell, as 2nd Baronet in 1787. He was created Baron Gwydir on 16 June 1796.

== Cricket ==
A keen amateur cricketer, Burrell has been called the third most influential member of the White Conduit Club and of the early MCC, after George Finch, 9th Earl of Winchilsea and Charles Lennox, 4th Duke of Richmond. he played in seven matches between 1787 and 1790. In a minor match for White Conduit Club against the Gentlemen of Kent at White Conduit Fields in 1785 he scored 97 runs in an innings.

== Family ==
He died in 1820. With Priscilla Bertie he had lived at Langley Park, Beckenham and had three sons and a daughter. He was succeeded in his titles by his eldest son, Peter Robert Drummond-Burrell, 2nd Baron Gwydyr, 22nd Baron Willoughby de Eresby.

Parliament of Great Britain
Preceded by Thomas More Molyneux; Sir Merrick Burrell, Bt	Member of Parliament for Haslemere; 1776–1780; With: Sir Merrik Burrell, Bt	Succeeded by Sir James Lowther, Bt; Edward Norton
Preceded by Lord Robert Bertie; Humphrey Sibthorp	Member of Parliament for Boston; 1782–1796; With: Humphrey Sibthorp 1782–1784; Dalhousie Watherston 1784–1790; Thomas Fydell 1790–1796	Succeeded by Thomas Fydell; Viscount Milsington
Court offices
Preceded by The Duke of Ancaster and Kesteven	Lord Great Chamberlain; Acting; 1780–1820	Succeeded by The Lord Willoughby de Eresby
Peerage of Great Britain
New creation	Baron Gwydyr; 1796–1820	Succeeded by Peter Drummond-Burrell
Baronetage of Great Britain
Preceded by Merrik Burrell	Baronet (of West Grinstead Park); 1787–1820	Succeeded by Peter Drummond-Burrell

== Bibliography ==
- Haygarth, Arthur (1996) [1862]. Scores & Biographies, Volume 1 (1744–1826). Kennington: Frederick Lillywhite. ISBN 978-19-00592-23-9.
- Haygarth, Arthur (1997) [1862]. Scores & Biographies, Volume 2 (1827–1840). Kennington: Frederick Lillywhite. ISBN 978-19-00592-23-9.
