= Charles Byrne (artist) =

Irish painter

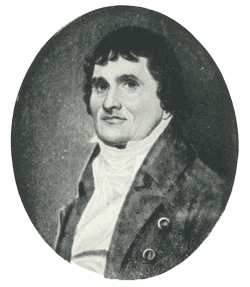
- Self portrait
- Born: 1757; Dublin, Ireland
- Died: 1810 (aged 52–53)? Dublin

Charles Byrne (1757–1810?) was an Irish painter of miniatures.

== Life ==
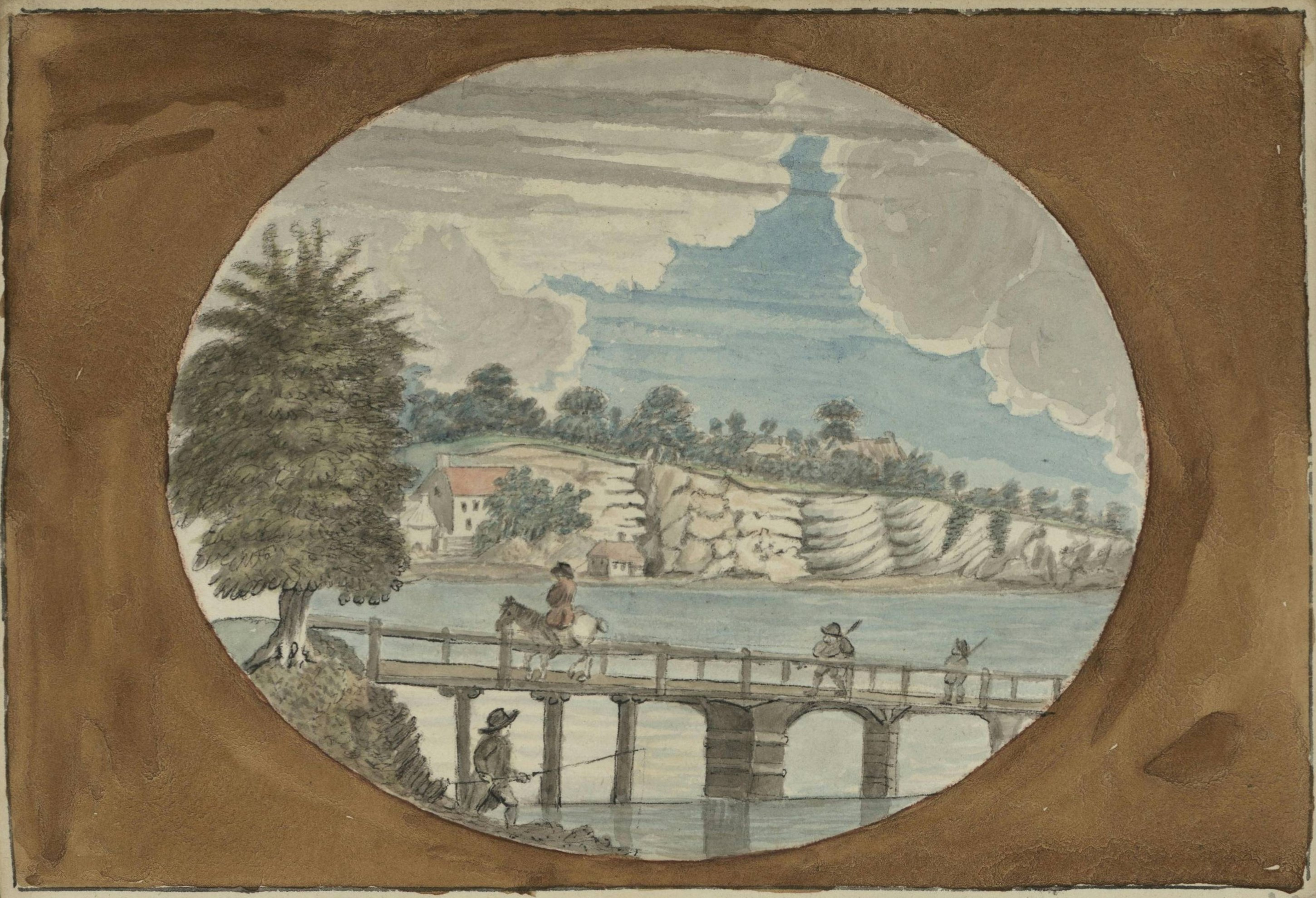
Part of Chepstow Bridge down River by Byrne, held by the National Library of Wales

Charles Byrne was born in Dublin in 1757. He was a student and assistant to the painter Sampson Towgood Roch, who was deaf. Byrne acted as Roch's interpreter. He later established his own studio at 19 Suffolk Street in 1791 while he also painted miniatures for a jeweller on Dame Street, Hutchinson. He also appears to have worked in London for a short period. He submitted 2 miniatures to be exhibited at Parliament House in 1802, with his address recorded as Exchequer Street.

He retired from the profession, and is believed to have suffered from severe mental health issues later in life. It is thought he died in 1810 in Dublin. The National Gallery of Ireland holds a number of his works.
