= 70th Regiment of Foot (1745) =

- Active: 1745–1746
- Country: Kingdom of Great Britain
- Branch: British Army
- Type: Infantry
- Garrison/HQ: Hull
- Engagements: Jacobite rising of 1745

Commanders
- Colonel of the Regiment: Peregrine Bertie, 3rd Duke of Ancaster and Kesteven

The 70th Regiment of Foot, or Ancaster's Regiment, was a regiment in the British Army from 1745 to 1746.

== History ==
In response to the Jacobite rising of 1745, the regiment was raised in Lincolnshire by Peregrine Bertie, 3rd Duke of Ancaster. The new regiment, made of ten companies, received the rank of 70th.

The 70th Foot was declared "half-complete" on November 1 and soon considered "ready to march". On November 7, the regiment dispatched six companies to Stamford. In mid-November, the regiment had three companies and the headquarters at Stamford, five companies at Lincoln and two companies at Grantham. The whole regiment was relocated at Hull in late November. As of January 26, it mustered 729 NCOs and privates for an authorized strength of 780.

From March 1746 onwards, the regiment was deployed to guard Jacobite prisoners. Two companies were sent to Lincoln and two others went to York.

On June 7, the companies stationed at Hull and York were ordered to join the others at Lincoln. The regiment was disbanded there nine days later.

== Uniform ==
The actual uniform of the regiment is unknown, but most of the regiments raised by noblemen in 1745 had blue coats and red facings.
