= Georgiana Cholmondeley, Marchioness of Cholmondeley =

The Most Honourable The Marchioness of Cholmondeley
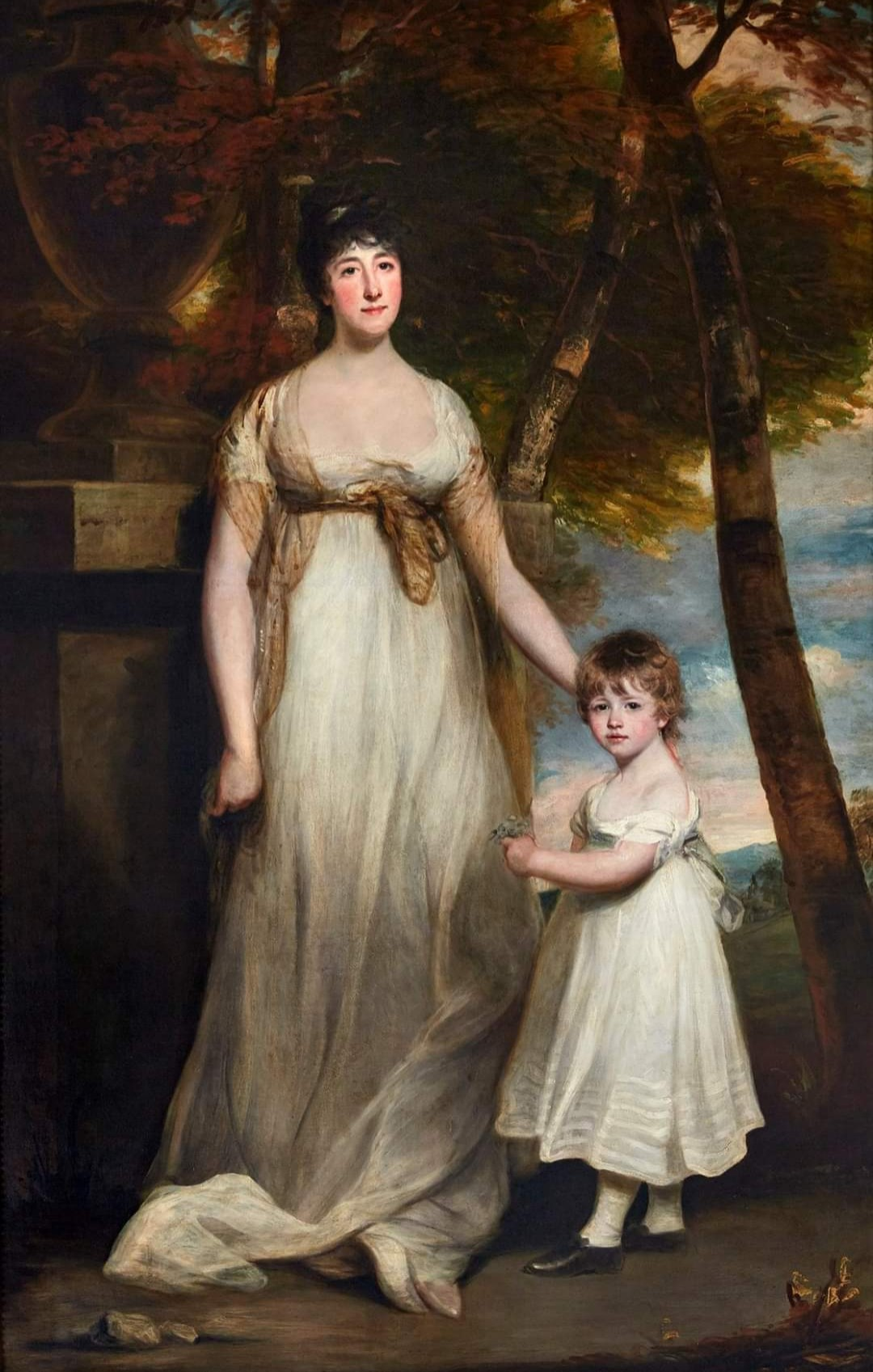
- The Marchioness with her younger son William (1805), by Charles Turner.
- Born: Lady Georgiana Charlotte Bertie; 7 August 1764
- Died: 23 June 1838 (aged 73); Carlton House Terrace, London
- Noble family: Bertie
- Spouse: George Cholmondeley, 1st Marquess of Cholmondeley
- Issue: Lady Charlotte Georgiana Cholmondeley; George Cholmondeley, 2nd Marquess of Cholmondeley; William Cholmondeley, 3rd Marquess of Cholmondeley
- Father: Peregrine Bertie, 3rd Duke of Ancaster and Kesteven
- Mother: Mary Panton
- Occupation: Lady of the Bedchamber to Caroline of Brunswick

Georgiana Charlotte Cholmondeley, Marchioness of Cholmondeley (/ˈtʃʌmli/ CHUM-lee; 7 August 1764 – 23 June 1838), formerly Lady Georgiana Charlotte Bertie, was the wife of George Cholmondeley, 1st Marquess of Cholmondeley.

She was the daughter of Peregrine Bertie, 3rd Duke of Ancaster and Kesteven, and his second wife Mary. She married the marquess, then still an earl, on 25 April 1791 in London. They had three children:

- Lady Charlotte Georgiana Cholmondeley (February 1795 – 24 June 1828), who married Lt.-Col. Hugh Henry Seymour, son of Admiral Lord Hugh Seymour, and had children
- George Horatio Cholmondeley, 2nd Marquess of Cholmondeley (16 January 1792 – 8 May 1870)
- William Henry Hugh Cholmondeley, 3rd Marquess of Cholmondeley (31 March 1800 – 16 December 1884)

The earl already had an illegitimate daughter, Harriet, born around 1790 to his mistress, Madame Saint-Albin. Also living in the household was Georgiana Seymour, an illegitimate daughter of an earlier mistress, Grace Dalrymple; Georgiana's father was probably the Prince of Wales.

Through the marriage between the earl and Georgina Bertie, the ancient hereditary office of Lord Great Chamberlain (which had been held by her brother, Robert Bertie, 4th Duke of Ancaster and Kesteven, until his death in 1779) passed into the Cholmondeley family. Georgina's son George Cholmondeley, 2nd Marquess of Cholmondeley, shared the position.

In 1795, the marchioness (then still a countess) was appointed a Lady of the Bedchamber to the Princess of Wales.

Their family home was Cholmondeley Castle in Cheshire, which was rebuilt in 1801-04 according to the earl's own design. In 1815 he was created Marquess of Cholmondeley, making his wife a marchioness.

Lord Cholmondeley, who was fifteen years his wife's senior, died in 1827, and was succeeded by his eldest son George. The dowager marchioness died at Carlton House Terrace in London, aged 73.
