= Sampson Towgood Roch =

Irish painter

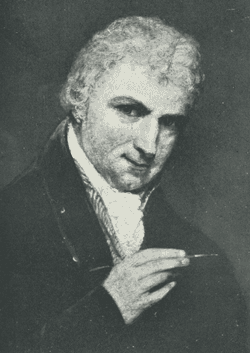
- Born: 1757; Youghal, County Cork, Ireland
- Died: 1847 (aged 89–90); Woodbine Hill, County Waterford

Sampson Towgood Roch (1757–1847) was an Irish painter of miniatures.

== Life and family ==
Roch was born in 1757, the eldest son of William and Mary Roch (née Holmes) of Youghal, in County Cork. His grandfather was James Roch of Glyn Castle, near Carrick-on-Suir, County Tipperary, and his great-grandfather was James Roch, high sheriff of County Waterford. Roch was born deaf. While visiting family in Cashel, County Tipperary in 1773, Roch displayed a talent for drawing both landscapes and portraits of friends and family. There is no evidence that Roch received any formal training and he is believed to have been self-taught. He was most likely familiar with other local artists in Cork, where he was living in 1787. His earliest works are a portrait of his father from 1777 and his mother in 1781.

Roch married his distant cousin, Melian Roch, on 29 May 1787. It was an arranged marriage, and she was the only daughter of his uncle James Roch and James's first wife, Isabella Odell of Odell Lodge, Ardmore, County Waterford.

== Career ==
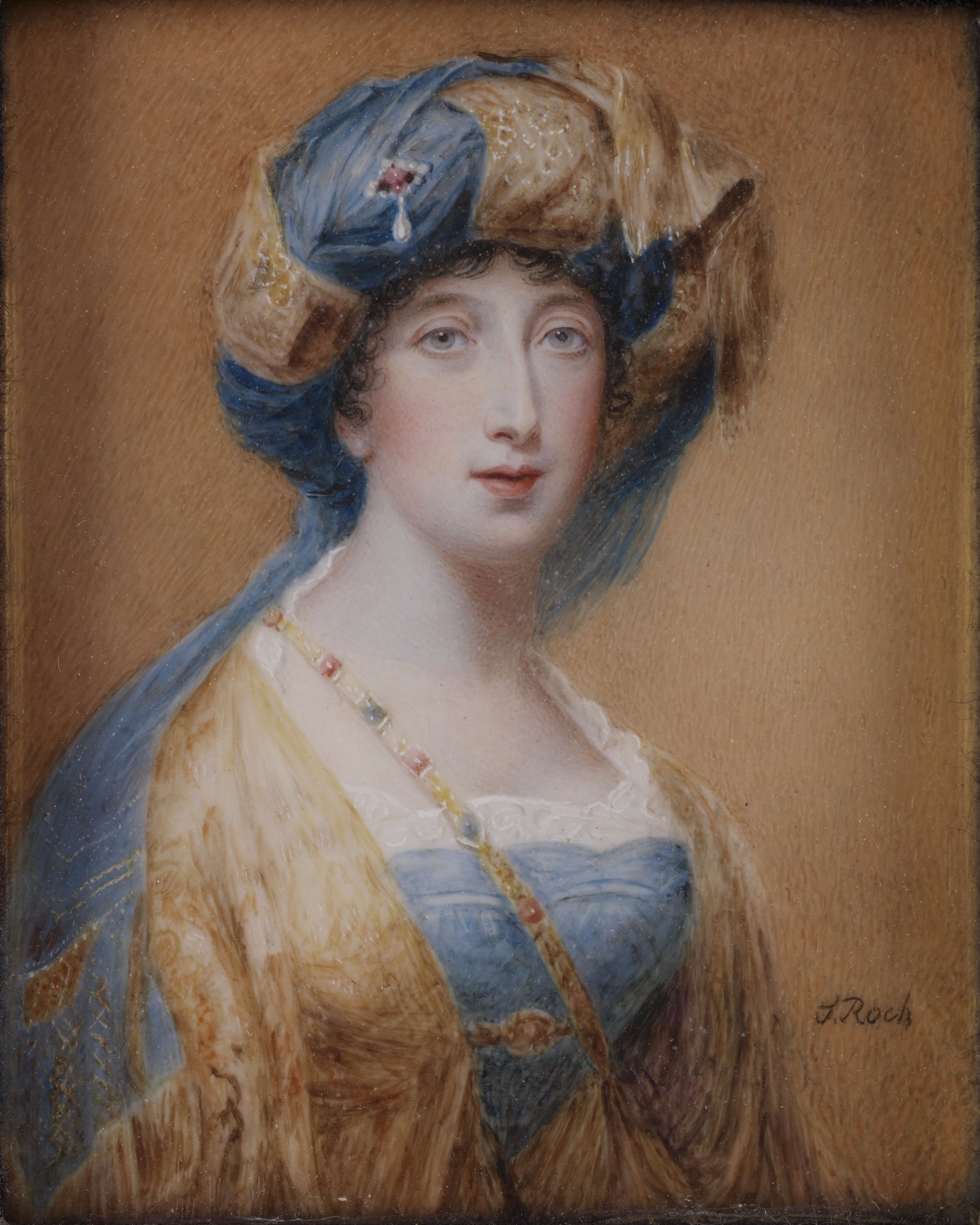
Priscilla, Lady Willoughby de Eresby, miniature by Roch, ca. 1815

By 1779 he had established himself in Dublin, in the parish of St John. There are no records of him attending any classes in Dublin, or of his apprenticeship with any established Dublin painters. By 1782, Roch was travelling to England, with a portrait of Mrs Hester Thrale, a friend of Samuel Johnson, dated that year. Having returned to Dublin, Roch was living at 152 Capel Street in 1784. He became acquainted with Horace Hone, who also lived on Capel Street, and who painted a portrait of Roch in 1785. In 1786, Roch copied Hone's miniature portrait of Lord Charlemont. He returned to Cork in 1786, returning to Dublin in 1788 after his marriage. From 1789 to 1792, they lived on Grafton Street, from where Roch painted numerous people including Mrs Thorp and Mrs Mangan. During his time in Dublin, Charles Byrne (1757-1810?), a fellow artist was his student and acted as Roch's interpreter.

In 1792 the couple moved to Bath, where his practice flourished. From here, Roch painted portraits for many members of royalty and aristocracy including a portrait of Princess Amelia, the youngest daughter of George III. It is said that he was offered a knighthood, which was declined due to his disability. Roch also painted portraits of Charles Le Bas and James King, two masters of ceremonies in Bath. He also painted a number of portraits of military and naval figures, with the surviving works being of unidentified officers. From 1817 to 1822, he lived on Pierrepont Street.

== Later life and death ==
Roch returned to Ireland in 1822 and later retired. Besides painting some more miniatures, he also sketched scenes of Irish rural life. He may have worked in Cork first, but later lived at the family home, Woodbine Hill, County Waterford. His wife died on 21 September 1837. Roch died in February 1847, and was buried on 20 February 1847 at the family plot at Ardmore, County Waterford.

Interest in Roch's work increased in the 20th century with a number of sales of his miniatures, and a bequest to the National Gallery of Ireland. Unlike many of his contemporaries, Roch often painted his subjects with a smile or a grin, which some critics such as Daphne Foskett, considered a defect.

== Selected miniatures ==
- James Roch (1786)
- Ambrose Roch (1788)
- Mr Lee
- Mrs Piozzi (1782)
- Mr Smith of Ballynatray
- Portrait of a Lady (1805)
- Portrait of a Gentleman (1805)
- Lady Kingsmill (1820)
