= George Cholmondeley, 1st Marquess of Cholmondeley =

British peer and politician

The Most Honourable The Marquess of Cholmondeley KG GCH PC
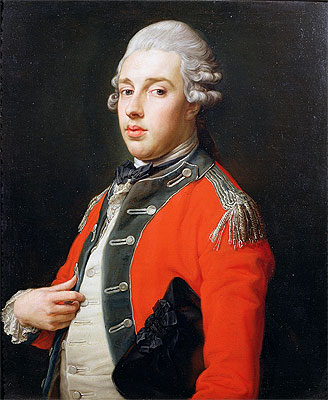
- The Marquess of Cholmondeley by Pompeo Batoni, 1772, Houghton Hall, Norfolk.

Lord Steward of the Household
- In office 19 February 1812 – 11 December 1821
- Monarchs: George III; George IV
- Prime Minister: The Earl of Liverpool
- Preceded by: The Earl of Aylesford
- Succeeded by: The Marquess Conyngham

Personal details
- Born: George James Cholmondeley; 11 May 1749
- Died: 10 April 1827 (aged 77)
- Spouse: Lady Georgiana Charlotte Bertie (m. 1791)
- Children: George Cholmondeley, 2nd Marquess of Cholmondeley; William Cholmondeley, 3rd Marquess of Cholmondeley; Lady Charlotte Georgiana Seymour
- Parents: George Cholmondeley, Viscount Malpas; Hester Edwardes

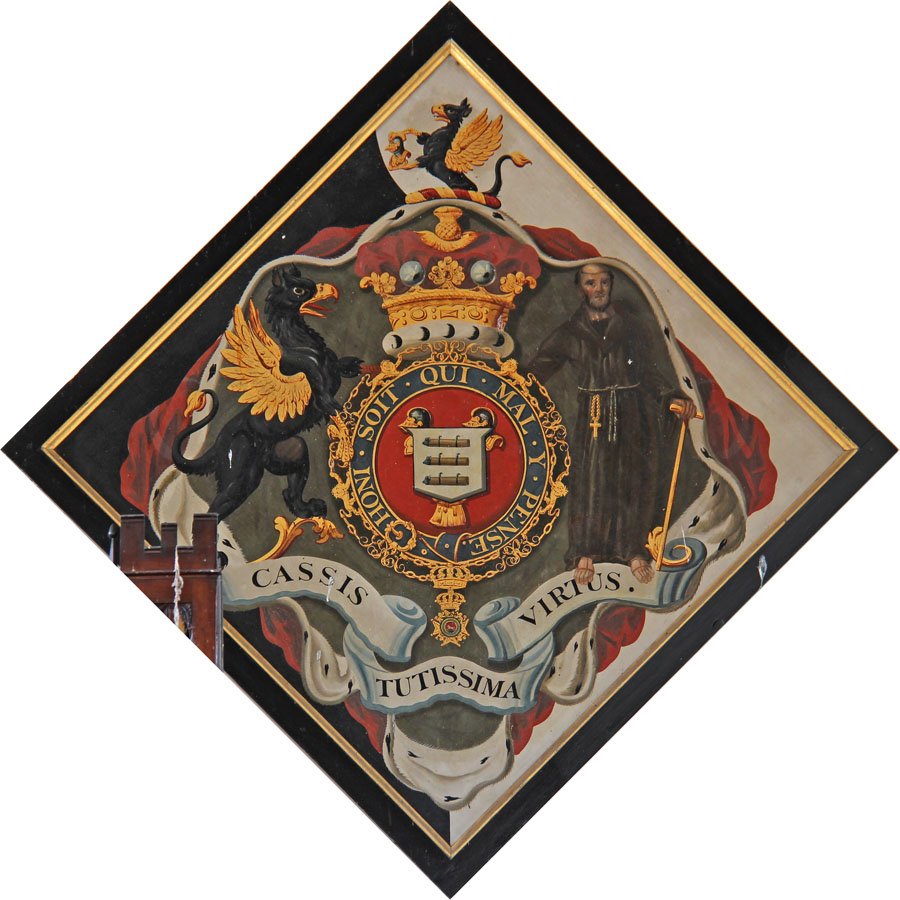
Hatchment in St Martin's Church, Houghton, showing Cholmondeley with inescutcheon of Bertie, all circumscribed by the Garter

George James Cholmondeley, 1st Marquess of Cholmondeley, (/ˈtʃʌmli/ CHUM-lee; 11 May 1749 – 10 April 1827), styled Viscount Malpas between 1764 and 1770 and known as the Earl of Cholmondeley between 1770 and 1815, was a British peer and politician.

== Background and education ==
Cholmondeley was the son of George Cholmondeley, Viscount Malpas, and Hester Edwardes. George Cholmondeley, 3rd Earl of Cholmondeley, was his grandfather. He was the great-grandson of Sir Robert Walpole, the first Prime Minister of Great Britain. He was educated at Eton. In January 1776, Cholmondeley began an affair with the noted beauty Grace Dalrymple Elliot, allegedly taking her up during a Pantheon masquerade ball. Grace was legally separated from her husband, Dr. John Eliot, who was to divorce her several months later. This liaison lasted for three years.

== Career ==
In 1770 he succeeded his grandfather as fourth Earl of Cholmondeley and entered the House of Lords. In April 1783, Cholmondeley was admitted to the Privy Council and appointed Captain of the Yeomen of the Guard in the government of the Duke of Portland, a post he held until December the same year. He remained out of office for the next 29 years, but in 1812 he was made Lord Steward of the Household in Spencer Perceval's Tory administration. He continued in the post after Lord Liverpool became prime minister after Perceval's assassination in May 1812, holding it until 1821.

In 1815, Cholmondeley was created Earl of Rocksavage, in the County of Chester, and Marquess of Cholmondeley. He was further honoured when he was made a Knight Grand Cross of the Royal Guelphic Order (Hanoverian Order) in 1819 and a Knight of the Garter in 1822. Apart from his political career, he was also Lord-Lieutenant of Cheshire from 1770 to 1783 and Vice-Admiral of Cheshire from 1770 to 1827.

Cholmondeley Sound, in southeast Alaska, was named for him in 1793 by George Vancouver.

== Personal life ==
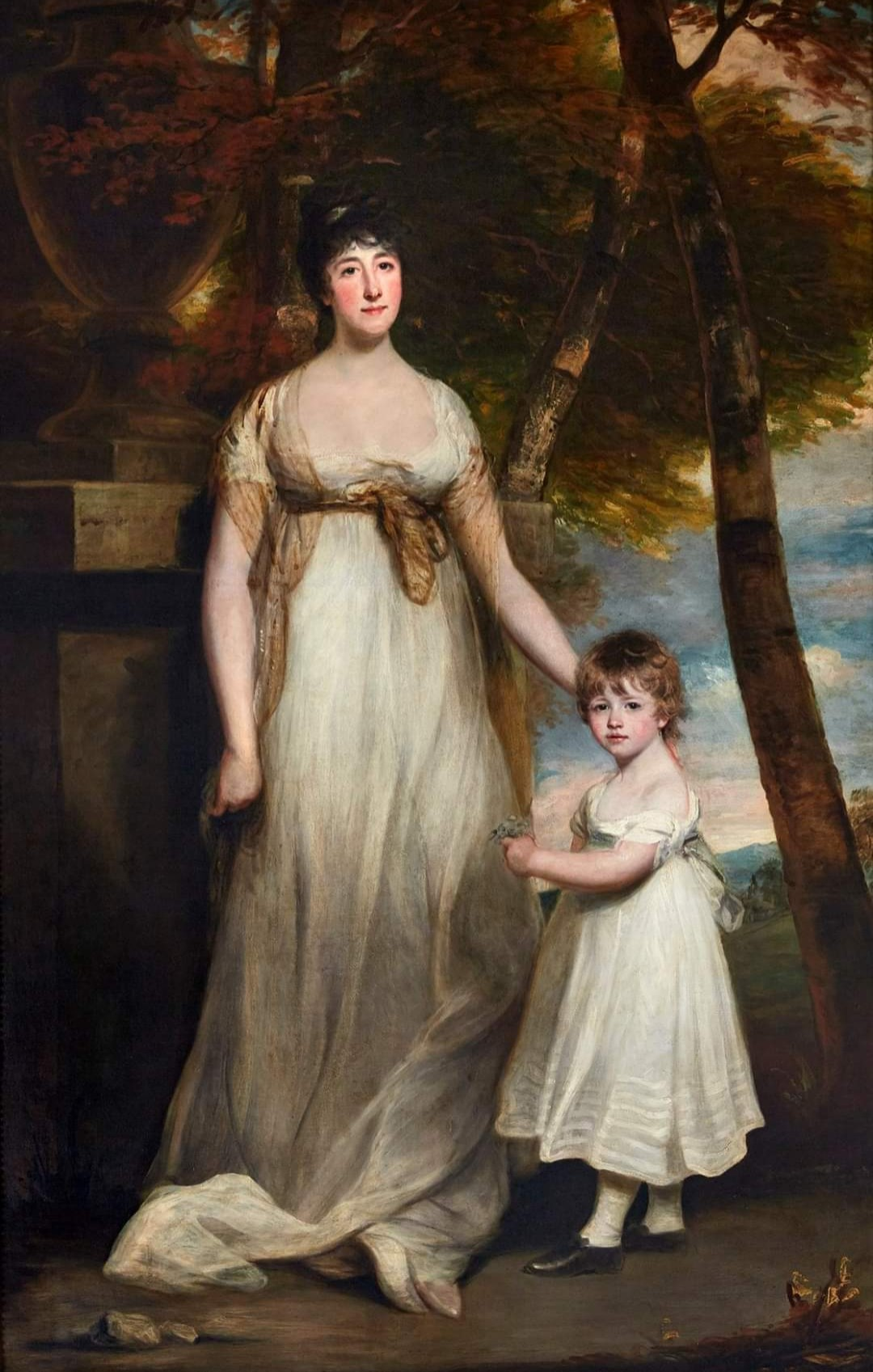
Lady Cholmondeley and her son William Henry Hugh Cholmondeley, 3rd Marquess of Cholmondeley (1805), by Charles Turner.

Lord Cholmondeley married Lady Georgiana Charlotte Bertie, daughter of Peregrine Bertie, 3rd Duke of Ancaster and Kesteven, on 25 April 1791. Through this marriage the ancient hereditary office of Lord Great Chamberlain came into the Cholmondeley family. They had three children:

- George Cholmondeley, 2nd Marquess of Cholmondeley (1792–1870)
- William Cholmondeley, 3rd Marquess of Cholmondeley (1800–1884)
- Lady Charlotte Cholmondeley (d. 24 June 1828), married Hugh Henry John Seymour on 18 May 1818

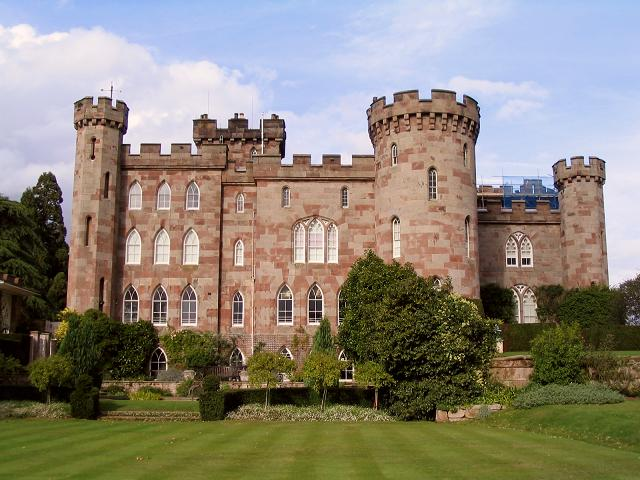
Cholmondeley Castle

He was friends with the disreputable courtesans Gertrude Mahon, Grace Elliott and Kitty Frederick. According to the betting book for Brooks's, a London gentlemen's club, Cholmondeley once wagered two guineas (£2.10) to Lord Derby, to receive 500 guineas (£525.00) upon having sexual intercourse with a woman "in a balloon one thousand yards [910 m] from the Earth." It is unknown whether the bet was ever finalised.

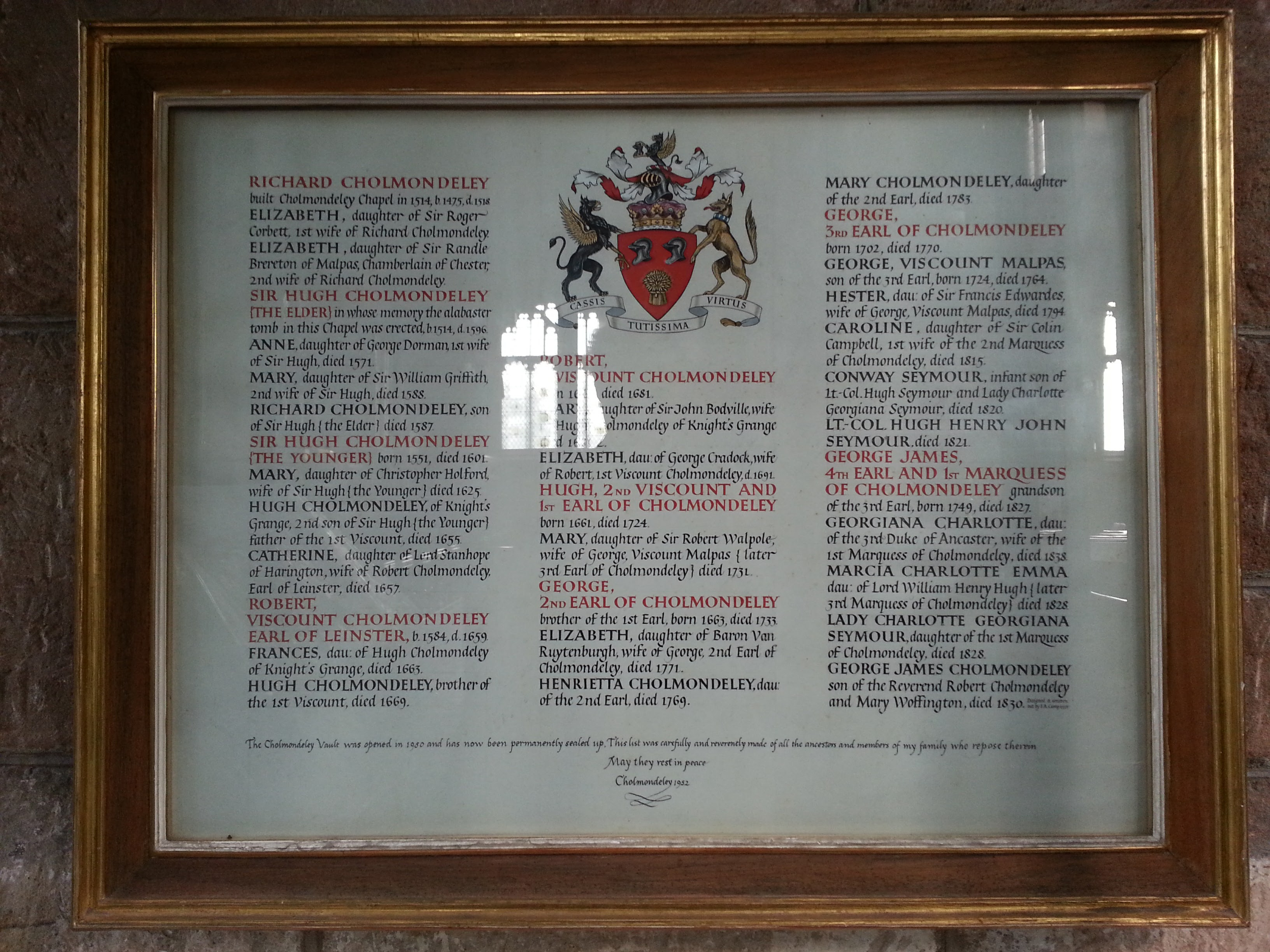
Cholmondeley's listing in the family vault at St Oswald's Church, Malpas

Eighteenth-century English Studies professor and Guggenheim Fellow Arthur Sherbo nominated Lord Cholmondeley as the likely real-life inspiration for the character of Rawdon Crawley in William Makepeace Thackeray's satirical novel Vanity Fair.

== Notes ==
Diplomatic posts
Preceded by Hugh Elliot	British Minister to Prussia; 1782	Succeeded by Sir John Stepney, Bt
Political offices
Preceded by The Duke of Dorset	Captain of the Yeomen of the Guard; 1783	Succeeded by The Earl of Aylesford
Preceded by The Earl of Aylesford	Lord Steward of the Household; 1812–1821	Succeeded by The Marquess Conyngham
Honorary titles
Preceded by The Earl of Cholmondeley	Lord Lieutenant of Cheshire; 1770–1783	Succeeded by The 5th Earl of Stamford
Preceded by The Earl of Cholmondeley	Vice-Admiral of Cheshire; 1770–1827	Succeeded by The 6th Earl of Stamford
Peerage of the United Kingdom
New creation	Marquess of Cholmondeley; 1815–1827	Succeeded by George Cholmondeley
Peerage of Great Britain
Preceded by George Cholmondeley	Baron Newburgh (descended by acceleration); 1770–1822	Succeeded by George Cholmondeley
Peerage of England
Preceded by George Cholmondeley	Earl of Cholmondeley; 1770–1827	Succeeded by George Cholmondeley
