= Robert Bertie, 4th Duke of Ancaster and Kesteven =

British peer (1756–1779)

The Duke of Ancaster and Kesteven PC
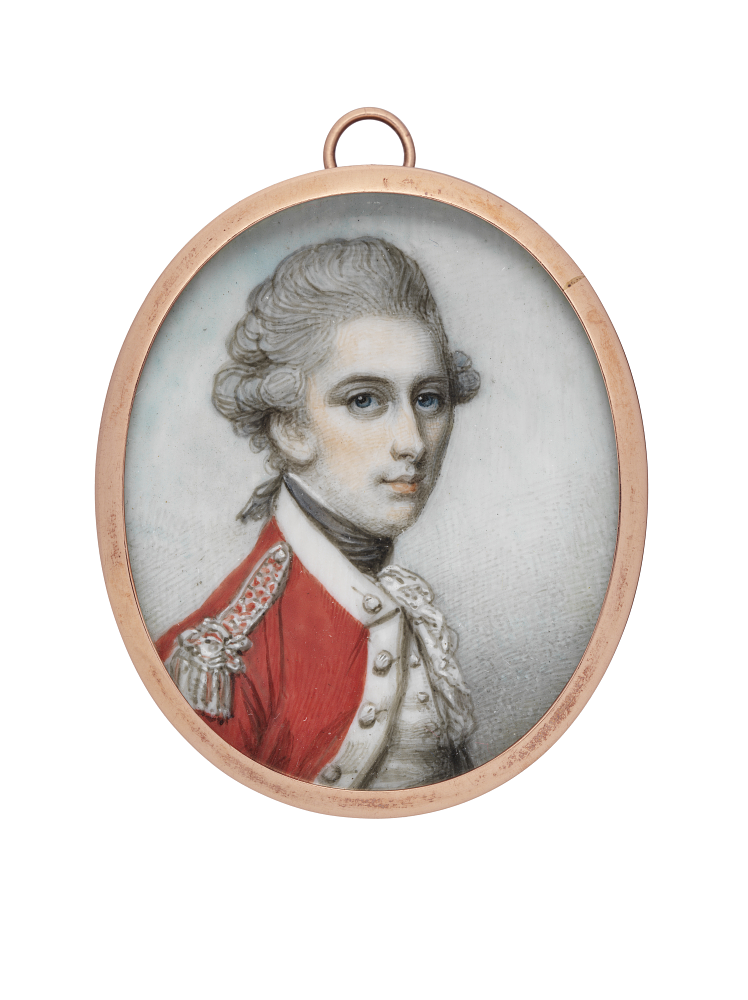
- portrait by Richard Cosway

4th Duke of Ancaster and Kesteven
- Reign: 1778–1779
- Predecessor: Peregrine Bertie, 3rd Duke of Ancaster and Kesteven
- Successor: Brownlow Bertie, 5th Duke of Ancaster and Kesteven
- Born: 17 October 1756; Grimsthorpe
- Died: 8 July 1779 (aged 22); Grimsthorpe
- Cause of death: Scarlet fever
- Buried: 22 July 1779; Edenham
- Noble family: Bertie
- Issue: Susan
- Father: Peregrine Bertie, 3rd Duke of Ancaster and Kesteven
- Mother: Mary Panton

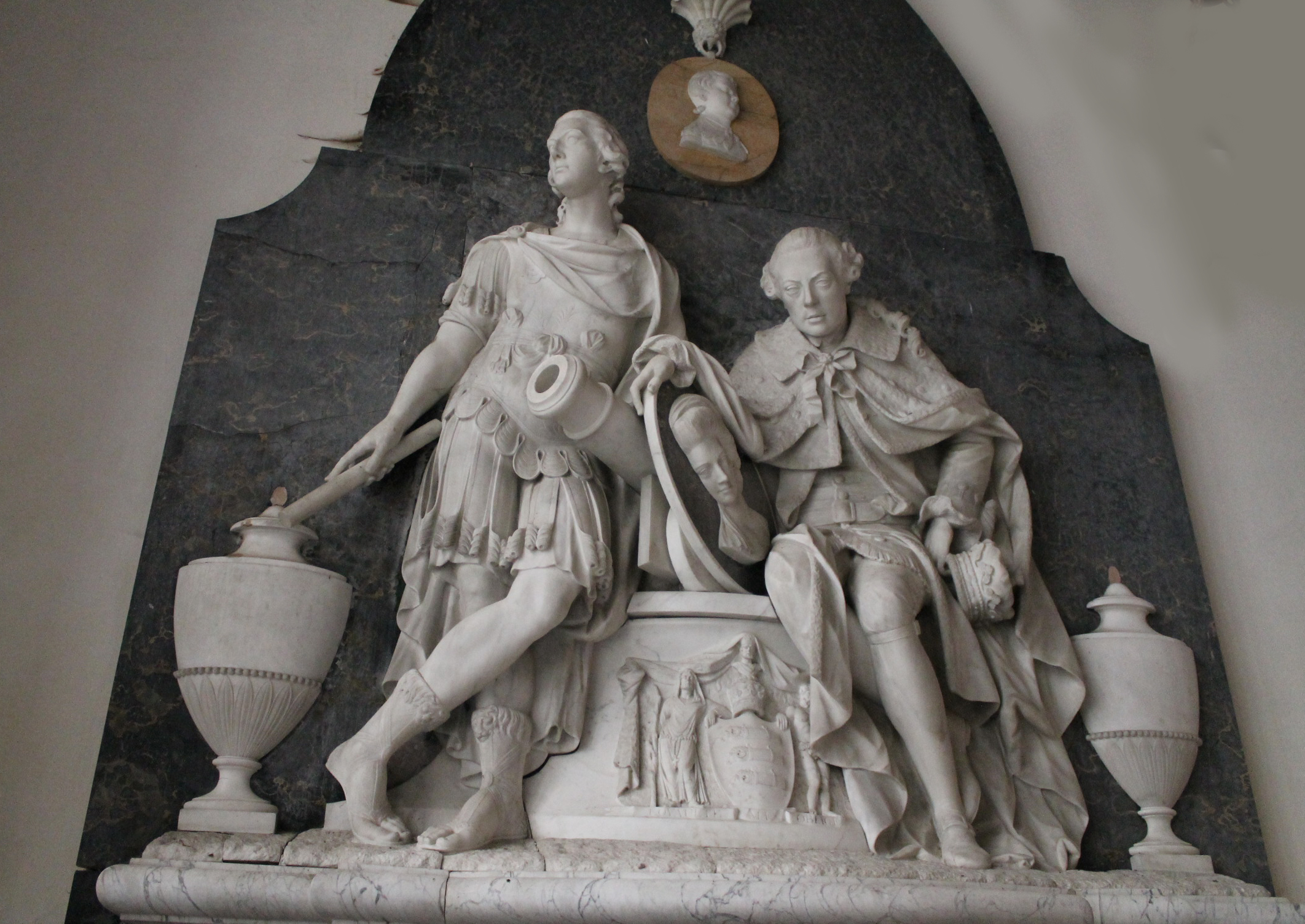
Funerary monument with his father the 3rd Duke

Robert Bertie, 4th Duke of Ancaster and Kesteven, PC (17 October 1756 – 8 July 1779), styled Lord Robert Bertie until 1758 and Marquess of Lindsey between 1758 and 1778, was a British peer.

== Early life ==
He was born in Grimsthorpe, the second son of the General Peregrine Bertie, 3rd Duke of Ancaster and Kesteven (died 1778), and Mary Panton (died 1793)

On the death of his elder brother, Peregrine Thomas Bertie, Marquess of Lindsey, on 12 December 1758, he inherited the courtesy title of Marquess of Lindsey. He was educated at Eton College and St John's College, Cambridge.

== Career ==
About 1777, he served as a volunteer in North America. A lieutenant in the 7th Regiment of Foot, on 20 January 1778, he was promoted to a captaincy in the 15th Regiment of Foot.

On his father's death on 12 August 1778, he succeeded as 4th Duke of Ancaster and Kesteven, 4th Marquess of Lindsey, 7th Earl of Lindsey, 20th Baron Willoughby de Eresby and Hereditary Lord Great Chamberlain. He was the last to hold the Lord Great Chamberlainship as an undivided office. On 12 February 1779 he was invested as Privy Counsellor and was Lord Lieutenant of Lincolnshire.

== Personal life ==
He never married and died in Grimsthorpe on 8 July 1779 from scarlet fever. At the time of his death he was engaged to Lady Anna Waldegrave, daughter of James Waldegrave, 2nd Earl Waldegrave, and Maria Walpole, the illegitimate granddaughter of Sir Robert Walpole, the Prime Minister. After his death, his fiancée married Lord Hugh Seymour. He was buried on 22 July 1779 in Edenham.

On his death, the Hereditary Lord Great Chamberlainship and the Barony Willoughby de Eresby fell into abeyance between his two sisters, all other titles of his passed to his uncle. An illegitimate daughter of the 4th duke, Susan, was married to Banastre Tarleton; but there were no children.

Political offices
| Preceded by The Duke of Ancaster and Kesteven | Lord Great Chamberlain; 1778–1779 | Abeyant |
Honorary titles
| Preceded by The Duke of Ancaster and Kesteven | Lord Lieutenant of Lincolnshire; 1779 | Succeeded by The Duke of Ancaster and Kesteven |
Peerage of Great Britain
| Preceded by Peregrine Bertie | Duke of Ancaster and Kesteven; 1778–1779 | Succeeded by Brownlow Bertie |
Peerage of England
| Preceded by Peregrine Bertie | Baron Willoughby de Eresby; 1778–1779 | Abeyant (abeyance terminated in 1780 for Priscilla Bertie) |
