= Peregrine Bertie, 3rd Duke of Ancaster and Kesteven =

English peer (1714–1778)

General His Grace The Duke of Ancaster and Kesteven PC
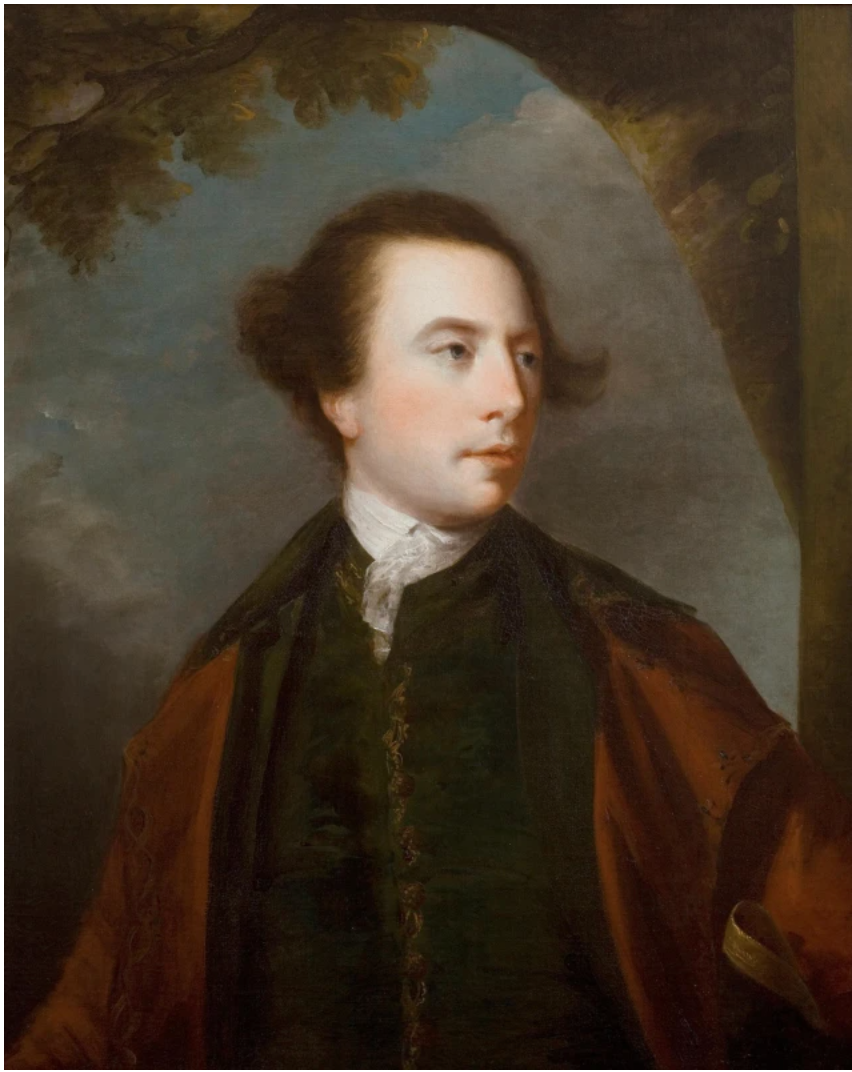

Lord Great Chamberlain
- In office 1742–1778
- Preceded by: The Duke of Ancaster and Kesteven
- Succeeded by: The Duke of Ancaster and Kesteven

Personal details
- Born: Peregrine Bertie; 1714 England
- Died: 12 August 1778 (aged 63–64) England
- Spouse(s): Elizabeth Blundell; Mary Panton
- Children: Lady Mary Catherine Bertie; Peregrine Thomas Bertie, Marquess of Lindsey; Robert Bertie, 4th Duke of Ancaster and Kesteven; Priscilla Bertie, 21st Baroness Willoughby de Eresby; Georgiana Cholmondeley, Marchioness of Cholmondeley
- Parents: Peregrine Bertie, 2nd Duke of Ancaster and Kesteven (father); Jane Brownlow (mother)

General Peregrine Bertie, 3rd Duke of Ancaster and Kesteven, PC (1714 – 12 August 1778), styled Lord Willoughby de Eresby from 1715 to 1723 and Marquess of Lindsey from 1735 to 1742, was an English peer.

== Early life ==
Bertie was born in 1714 and, beginning, in 1715, was styled Lord Willoughby de Eresby. He was the eldest son of Peregrine Bertie, 2nd Duke of Ancaster and Kesteven, and Jane Brownlow (a daughter of Sir John Brownlow, 3rd Baronet). Among his younger siblings were Lord Albemarle Bertie (a gambler and sportsman who was blinded early in his youth), Brownlow Bertie, 5th Duke of Ancaster and Kesteven, Lady Mary Bertie (wife of Samuel Greatheed), Lady Albinia Bertie (wife of Francis Beckford), Lady Jane Bertie (wife of Gen. Edward Mathew), and Lady Caroline Bertie (wife of George Dewar).

== Career ==
On the death of his father in 1742, he succeeded him in the dukedom and as Lord Great Chamberlain and Lord Lieutenant of Lincolnshire, and was appointed to the Privy Council.

He raised a regiment (The Duke of Ancaster's Regiment) during the Jacobite rising of 1745. He gained the rank of Major-General on 19 January 1755, Lieutenant-General on 3 February 1759 and General on 25 May 1772.

For some time in the 1750s, he sought to establish a series of mines in the upper Conwy valley in Wales. For this purpose, he engaged the German immigrant, Diederich Wessel Linden as his agent.

== Personal life ==
He married, firstly, Elizabeth (née Blundell) Nicoll (d. 1743), widow of Charles Gounter Nicoll, on 22 May 1735. Elizabeth was the daughter of William Blundell of Basingstoke, Hampshire, whose mother, Alice Blunden, was the alleged victim of a notorious premature burial.

After her death in 1743, he married, secondly, Mary Panton, on 27 November 1750. Mary was the daughter of Thomas Panton of Newmarket, who was an equerry to King George II and master of the Thurlow Hunt. They had six children:

- Lady Mary Catherine Bertie (1754–1767), who died young.
- Peregrine Thomas Bertie, Marquess of Lindsey (1755–1758), who died young.
- Robert Bertie, 4th Duke of Ancaster and Kesteven (1756–1779), who never married as he died from scarlet fever while engaged to Lady Anna Waldegrave, daughter of James Waldegrave, 2nd Earl Waldegrave.
- a son (born and died 14 September 1759), who died young.
- Priscilla Barbara Elizabeth Bertie, 21st Baroness Willoughby de Eresby (1761–1828), who married Peter Burrell, 1st Baron Gwydyr, in 1779.
- Lady Georgina Charlotte Bertie (1764–1838), who married George Cholmondeley, 1st Marquess of Cholmondeley, and had issue.

Lord Ancaster died on 12 August 1778 and was succeeded in his titles by his only surviving son, Robert. After Robert's death in 1779 without a male heir, Peregrine's younger brother, Brownlow, succeeded to the dukedom.

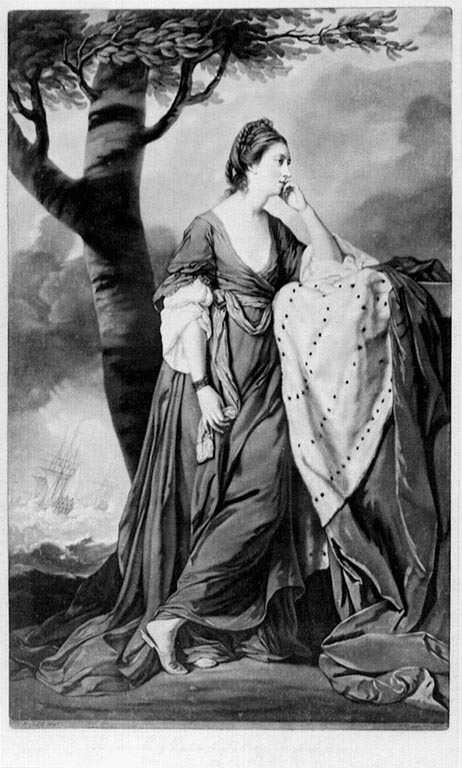
Mary, Duchess of Ancaster and Kesteven, wife of the 3rd Duke of Ancaster and Kesteven.

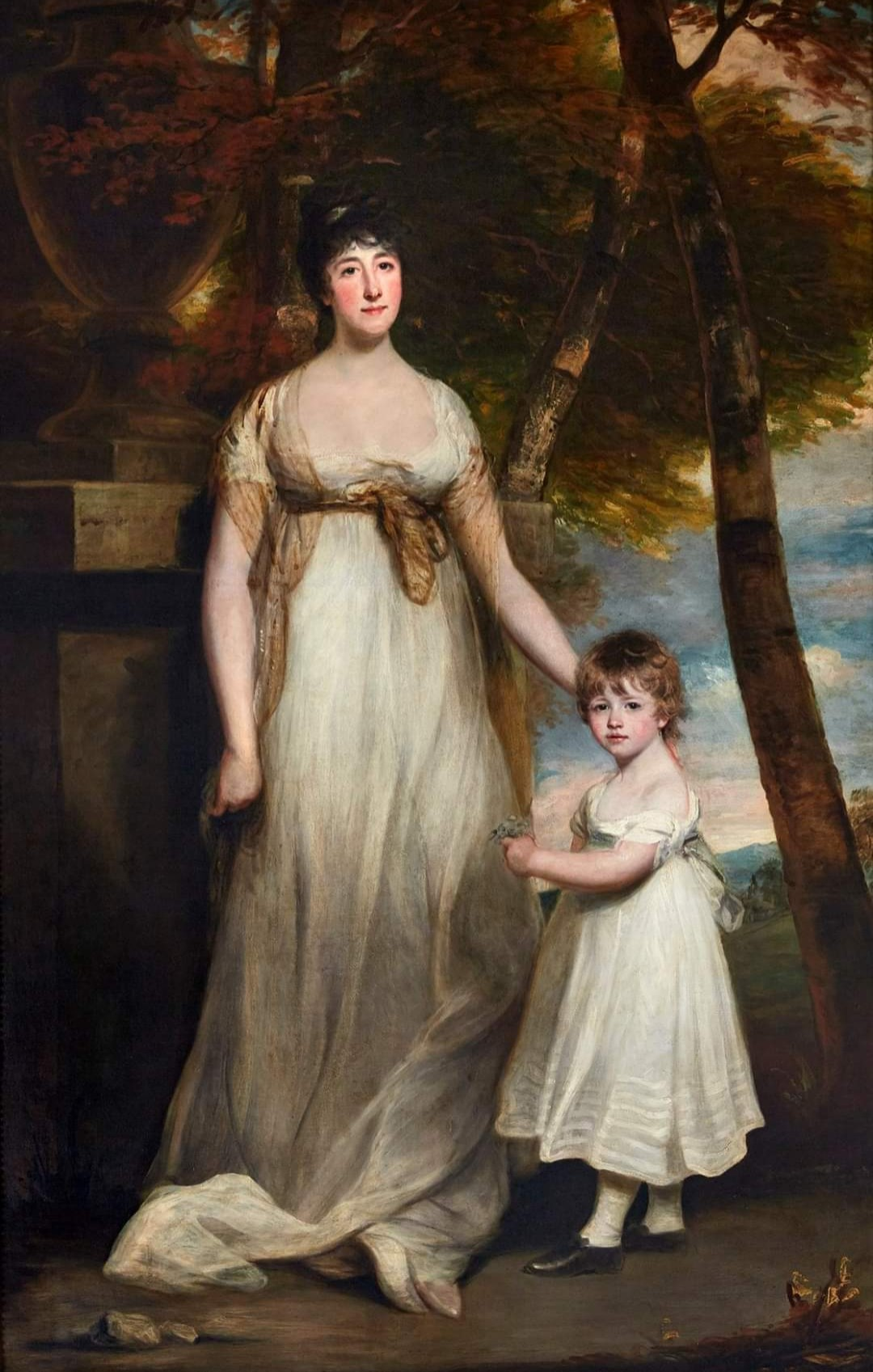
Lady Cholmondeley and her son William Henry Hugh Cholmondeley, 3rd Marquess of Cholmondeley (1805), by Charles Turner

Political offices
Preceded by The Duke of Ancaster and Kesteven	Lord Great Chamberlain; 1742–1778	Succeeded by The Duke of Ancaster and Kesteven
Preceded by The Viscount Weymouth	Master of the Horse to Queen Charlotte; 1765–1766	Succeeded by The Earl De La Warr
Preceded by The Earl of Hertford	Master of the Horse; 1766–1778	Succeeded by The Duke of Northumberland
Honorary titles
Preceded by The Duke of Ancaster and Kesteven	Lord Lieutenant of Lincolnshire; 1742–1778	Succeeded by The Duke of Ancaster and Kesteven
Peerage of Great Britain
Preceded by Peregrine Bertie	Duke of Ancaster and Kesteven; 1742–1778	Succeeded by Robert Bertie
