= George Cholmondeley =

George Cholmondeley may refer to:

- George Cholmondeley, 2nd Earl of Cholmondeley (1666–1733)
- George Cholmondeley, 3rd Earl of Cholmondeley (1703–1770)
- George Cholmondeley, Viscount Malpas (1724–1764), British soldier and MP
- George Cholmondeley, 1st Marquess of Cholmondeley (1749–1827)
- George Cholmondeley, 2nd Marquess of Cholmondeley (1792–1870)
- George Cholmondeley, 4th Marquess of Cholmondeley (1858–1923)
- George Cholmondeley, 5th Marquess of Cholmondeley (1883–1968)
- George Hugh Cholmondeley, 6th Marquess of Cholmondeley (1919–1990)
