= Great Officers of State (United Kingdom) =

Ceremonial ministers of the Crown

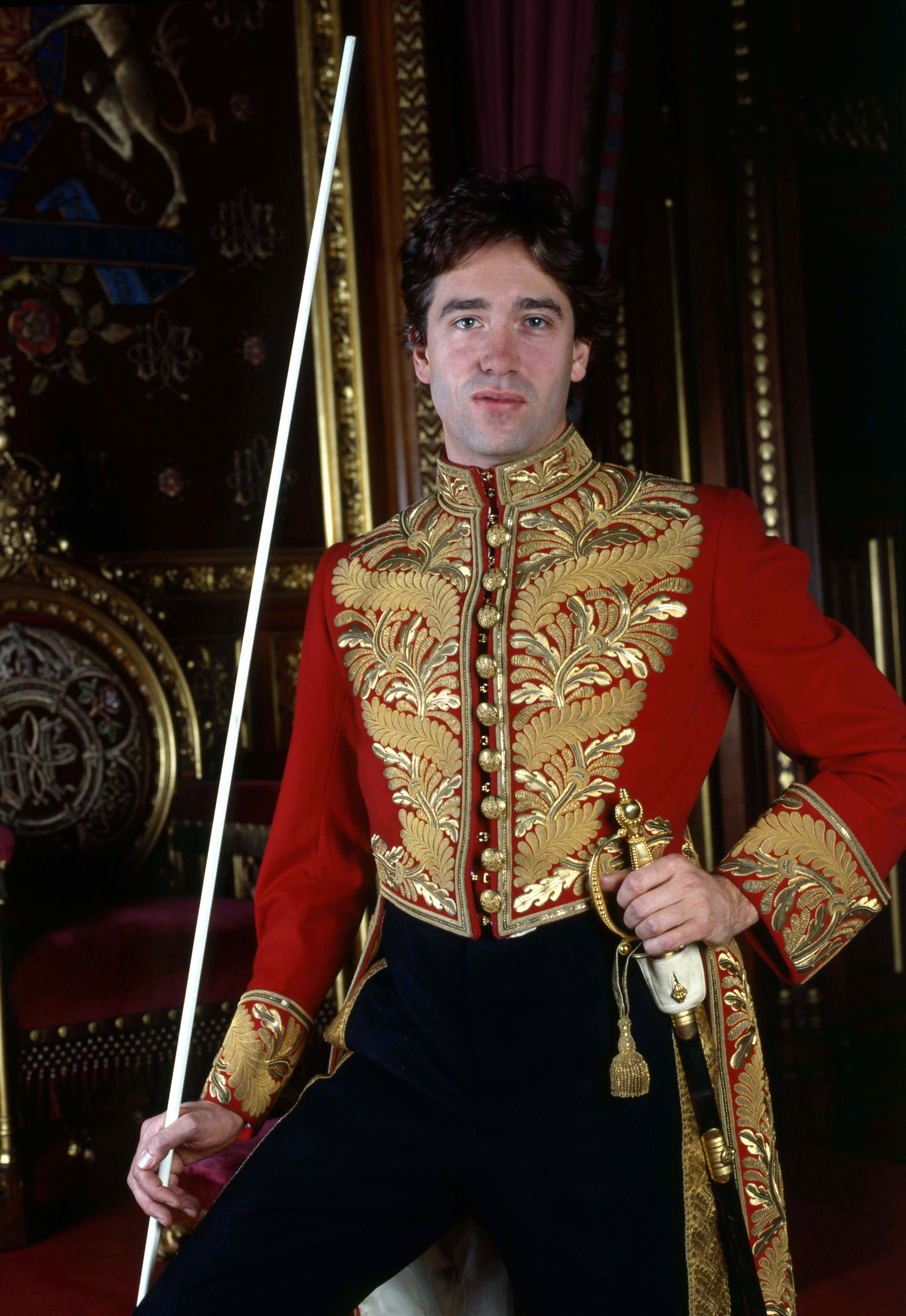
The 7th Marquess of Cholmondeley in uniform as Lord Great Chamberlain of England to Queen Elizabeth II, 1992

In the United Kingdom, the Great Officers of State are traditional ministers of the Crown who either inherit their positions or are appointed to exercise certain largely ceremonial functions or to operate as members of the government. Separate Great Officers exist for England and Wales, Scotland, and formerly for the Kingdom of Ireland, though some exist for Great Britain and the United Kingdom as a whole.

== England ==
Initially, after the Norman Conquest, England adopted the officers from the Normandy Ducal court (which was modelled after the French court) with a steward, chamberlain and constable. Originally having both household and governmental duties, some of these officers later split into two counterparts in Great Officer of the State and officer of the royal household, while other offices were superseded by new offices or absorbed by existing offices. This was due to many of the offices becoming hereditary because of feudalistic practices, and thus removed from the practical operation of either the state or the Royal Household. The Great Officers then gradually expanded to cover multiple duties, and have now become largely ceremonial.

Order	Office	Current holder	Superseded by	Royal Household
1	Lord High Steward of England	— (Note: These roles are now permanently vacant, except for brief appointments during coronations, where they perform certain functions in the ceremony.)	—	Lord Steward of the Household
2	Lord High Chancellor of Great Britain; Lord High Chancellor of England (1068–1707)	Alex Norris	—	—
3	Lord High Treasurer of the United Kingdom; Lord High Treasurer of Great Britain (1714–1817); Lord High Treasurer of England (c. 1126–1714)	— (Note: The office of Lord High Treasurer of the United Kingdom has been vacant since 1714, and its powers and duties are exercised by the Lords Commissioners of His Majesty's Treasury, who hold the offices of Treasurer of the Exchequer of Great Britain and Lord High Treasurer of Ireland in commission. The office of Lord High Treasurer of Great Britain was held concurrently with that of Treasurer of the Exchequer of Great Britain.)	Prime Minister of the United Kingdom and First Lord of the Treasury; Chancellor and Under-Treasurer of His Majesty's Exchequer and Second Lord of the Treasury; Lords Commissioners of His Majesty's Treasury	—
4	Lord President of the Council	Sir Alan Campbell; MP for Tynemouth (Leader of the House of Commons)	—	—
5	Lord Keeper of the Privy Seal	Angela Smith; Baroness Smith of Basildon (Leader of the House of Lords)	—	—
6	Lord Great Chamberlain of England	In gross: (Note: Under a 1912 agreement, the office, or the right to appoint a person to exercise it, rotates among the heirs of the 1st Earl of Ancaster, the 4th Marquess of Cholmondeley, and the 1st Earl Carrington, changing at the start of each reign, with the Cholmondeleys serving every other reign, and the heirs of Ancaster and Carrington once every four reigns each.); Rupert Carington; 7th Baron Carrington	Lord High Treasurer (in monetary affairs)	Lord Chamberlain of the Household
7	Lord High Constable of England	— (Note: The office reverted to the Crown in 1512.)	Earl Marshal (in the command of troops)	Master of the Horse to His Majesty
8	Earl Marshal of England; Lord Marshal of England (1135–1386)	Edward Fitzalan-Howard; 18th Duke of Norfolk	—	Master of the Horse to His Majesty
9	Lord High Admiral of the United Kingdom; Lord High Admiral of Great Britain (1707–1800); Lord (High) (Note: The office was known as Lord Admiral of England until 1638, when 'High' was added.) Admiral of England (1512–1707); High Admiral of England, Ireland and Aquitaine (1385–1512)	— (Note: The office is currently held by the Sovereign himself.)	—	—

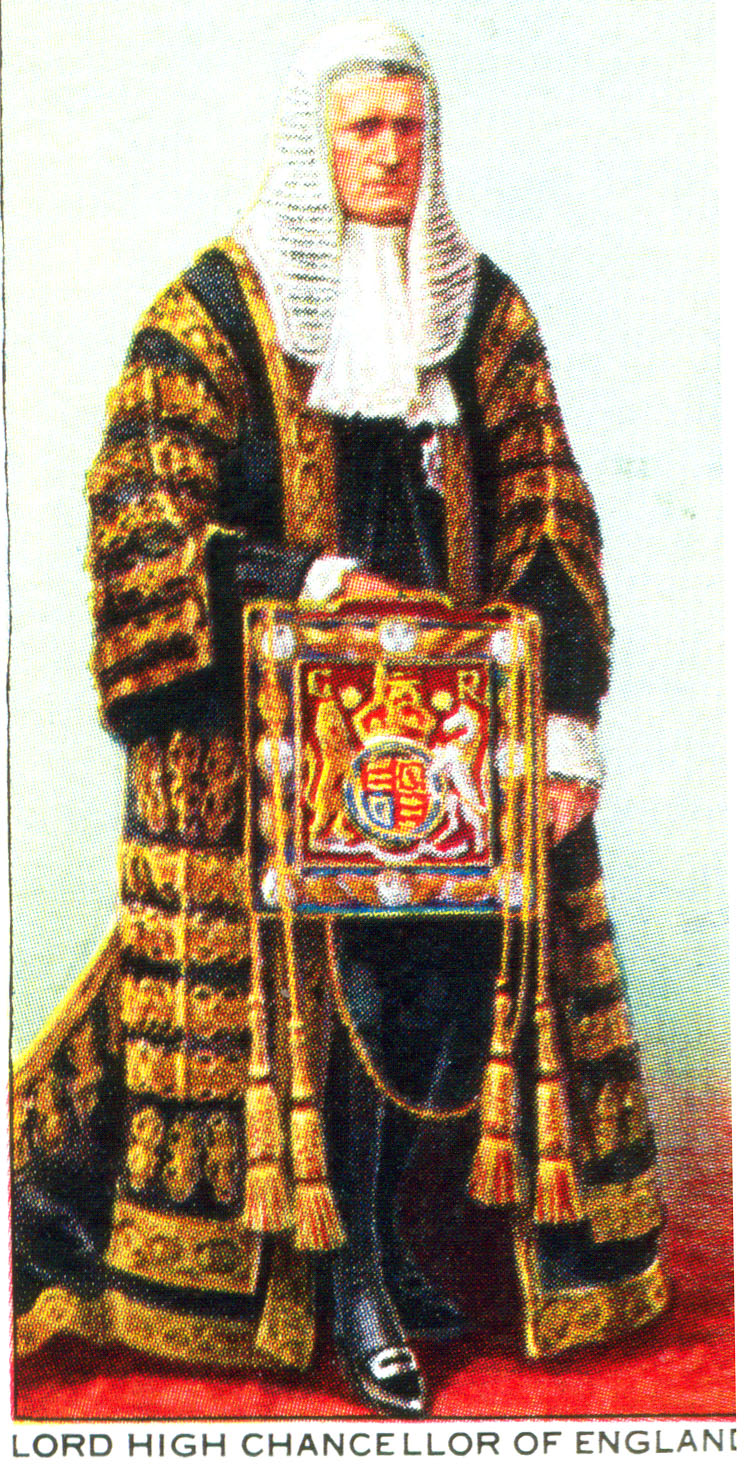
The Viscount Hailsham, robed as the Lord High Chancellor of Great Britain. He was the Lord High Steward at the last trial of a peer in the House of Lords.

=== Lord High Steward ===
The Lord High Steward (formally the Lord High Steward of England) has the sole power to preside over the impeachment trials of peers, the last of which happened in 1806. The most visible duty of the Lord High Steward today, even though purely ceremonial, is bearing St Edward's Crown at the coronations of monarchs.

The Lord High Stewardship was held by the Earls of Leicester until 1399, when it was merged into the Crown. Since 1421, the office is vested during coronations (and in the past for the trial of peers, a procedure abolished in 1948), and is otherwise left vacant.

=== Lord High Chancellor ===
The Lord Chancellor (formally the Lord High Chancellor of Great Britain) is the most senior of the Great Officers other than the Lord High Steward (who is appointed only on a temporary basis for coronations): he is the cabinet minister responsible for the Ministry of Justice (formerly the Lord Chancellor's Department and the Department for Constitutional Affairs), and formally the Keeper of the Great Seal. The office is currently always held by His Majesty's Principal Secretary of State for Justice. Historically, the Chancellor has enjoyed duties pertaining to the judiciary, and in the past he was the presiding officer of the House of Lords, and was made a peer if not already one; however, since 2007 only commoners have been appointed to the office.

The Lord Keeper of the Great Seal was generally a temporary position to handle the Great Seal until the appointment of a new High Chancellor, or for a non-noble appointment. Eventually, the Keeper was granted the same status as the Chancellor. By the late 1700s, the Lord Keeper's role was merged into the Chancellorship itself. Lords Commissioners of the Great Seal may be appointed to exercise the office of Lord Chancellor. The Lord Chancellor is assisted in his responsibility as custodian of the Great Seal by the Clerk of the Crown in Chancery and the Crown Office.

The Chief Justiciar (which superseded the Lord High Steward) was once ranked above the Lord High Chancellor in power, influence and dignity until 1231, when the position lost its standing in the Kingdom. With the Constitutional Reform Act 2005, the Lord Chancellor has been replaced in some roles by the Lord Chief Justice of England and Wales as head of the judiciary, and the Lord Speaker as chair of the House of Lords.

=== Lord High Treasurer ===
The Lord High Treasurer (formally the Lord High Treasurer of the United Kingdom), is responsible for government finances and spending. The office has been vacant since the death of Charles Talbot, 1st Duke of Shrewsbury, in 1714.

With the passing of the Consolidated Fund Act 1816, the offices of Lord High Treasurer of Great Britain (who in turn held the office of Treasurer of the Exchequer of Great Britain) and Lord High Treasurer of Ireland were merged into that of the Lord High Treasurer of the United Kingdom. The Act also enabled His Majesty to put the two offices in commission, granting the powers of the Lord High Treasurer to the said commission (the Lords Commissioners of His Majesty's Treasury). Contrary to popular belief, the commission is upon the offices of Treasurer of the Exchequer and Lord High Treasurer of Ireland, and not on the Lord High Treasurer of the United Kingdom. The Commissioners include the Prime Minister and the Chancellor of the Exchequer, who act as First Lord and Second Lord of the Treasury respectively, with other junior government whips serving as junior lords.

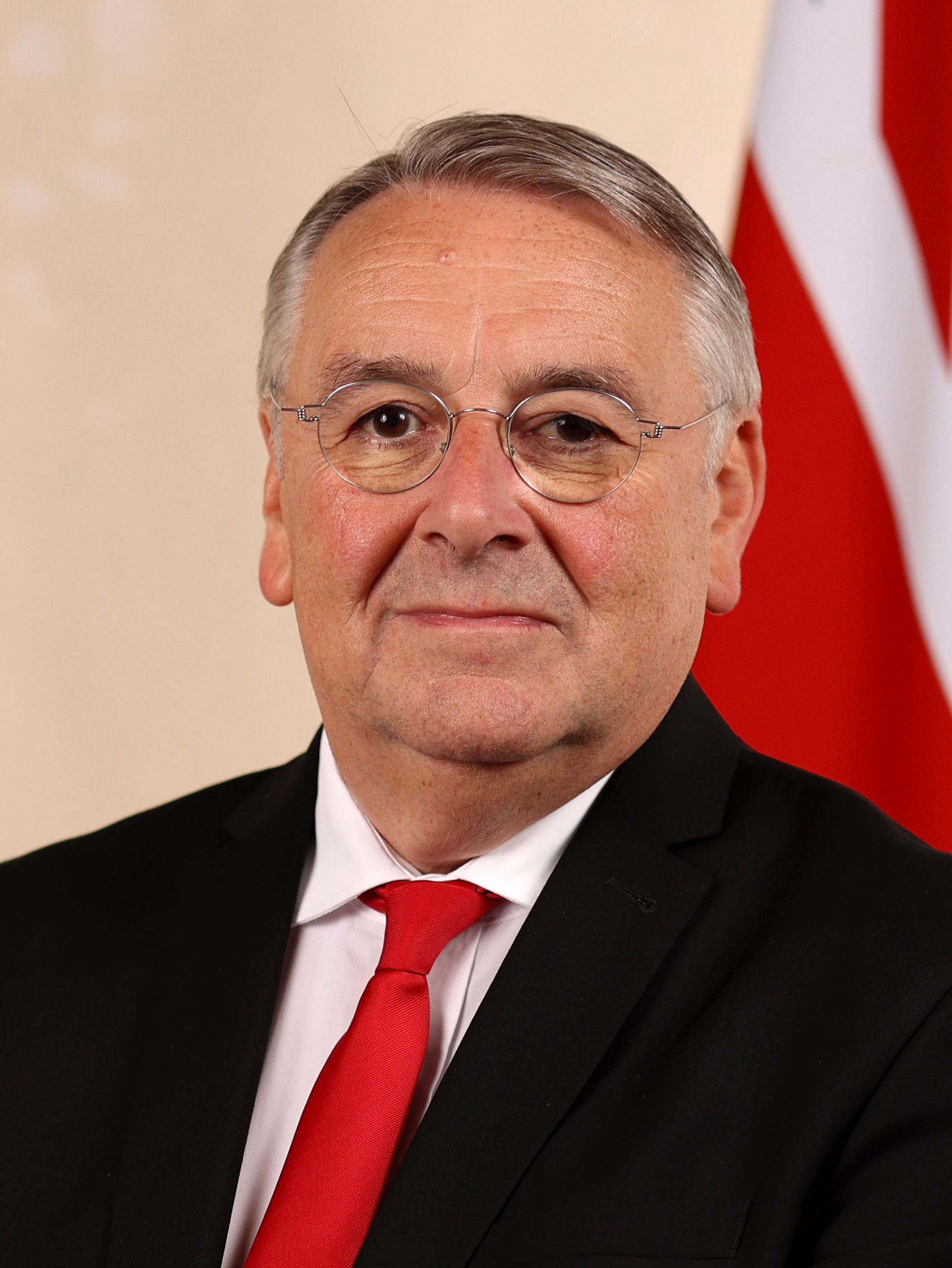
Sir Alan Campbell, current Lord President of the Council and Leader of the House of Commons.

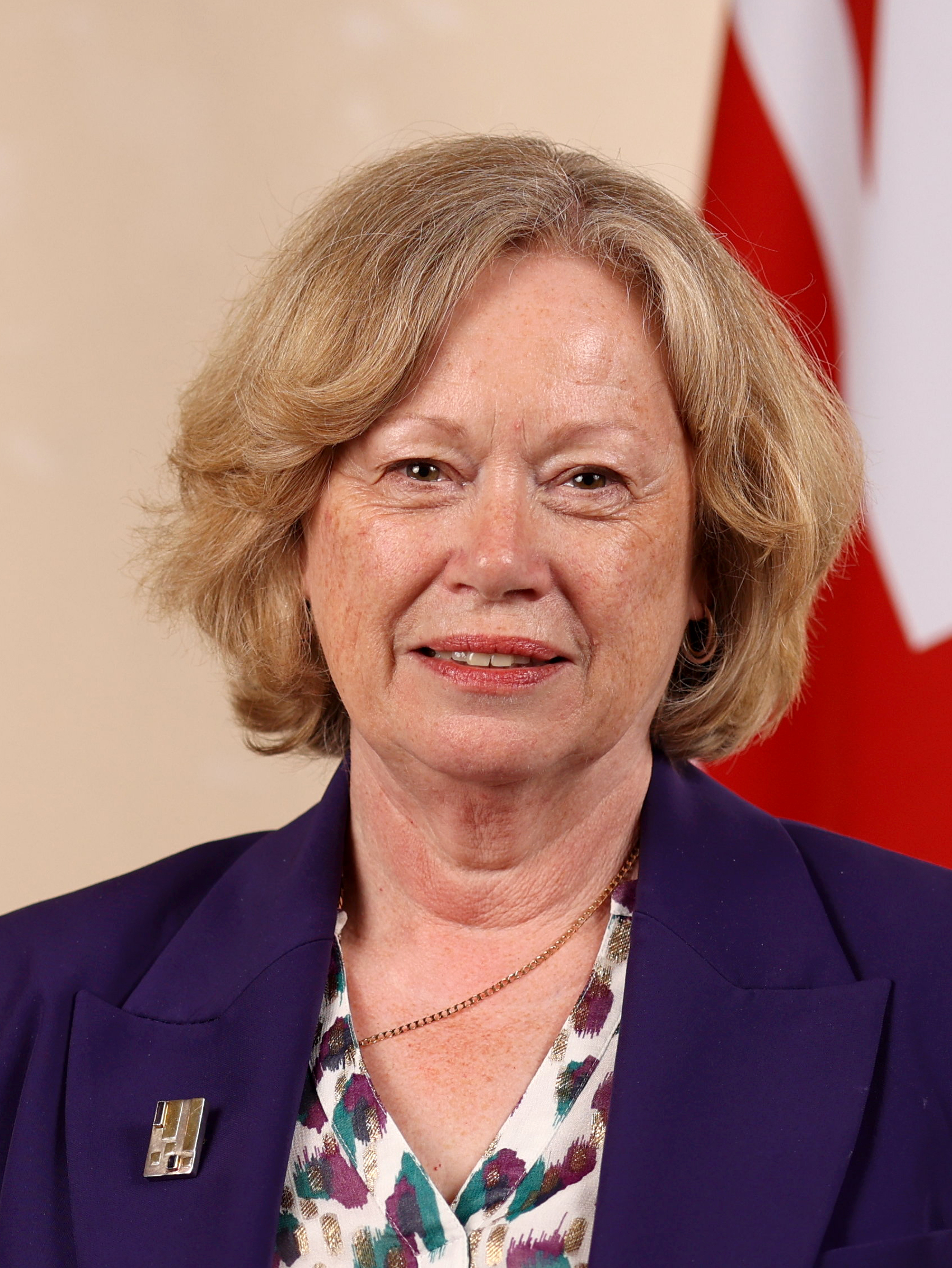
Angela Smith, Baroness Smith of Basildon, current Lord Privy Seal and Leader of the House of Lords.

=== Lord President of the Council ===
The Lord President of the Council presides over His Majesty's Most Honourable Privy Council, otherwise known as the Privy Council, though different governments have given the office various additional duties (as Churchill did after the Second World War). Since 1951, the office has usually been held by either the Leader of the House of Commons or the Leader of the House of Lords, with the other serving as Lord Privy Seal, though the office can be given to other high-ranking government ministers.

=== Lord Privy Seal ===
The Lord Privy Seal (formally the Lord Keeper of His Majesty's Privy Seal) was responsible for the monarch's privy seal, until the use of such seal became obsolete, and is now considered a sinecure position, usually granted to the Leader of one or other of the Houses of Parliament.

=== Lord Great Chamberlain ===
The Lord Great Chamberlain (formally the Lord Great Chamberlain of England) originally had financial duties pertaining to the royal Court, though these duties have now been assumed by the Lord High Treasurer. The Chamberlain also has charge of the Palace of Westminster (working within the House of Lords), and is responsible for arrangements during the State Opening of Parliament, a role which he shares with the Earl Marshal.

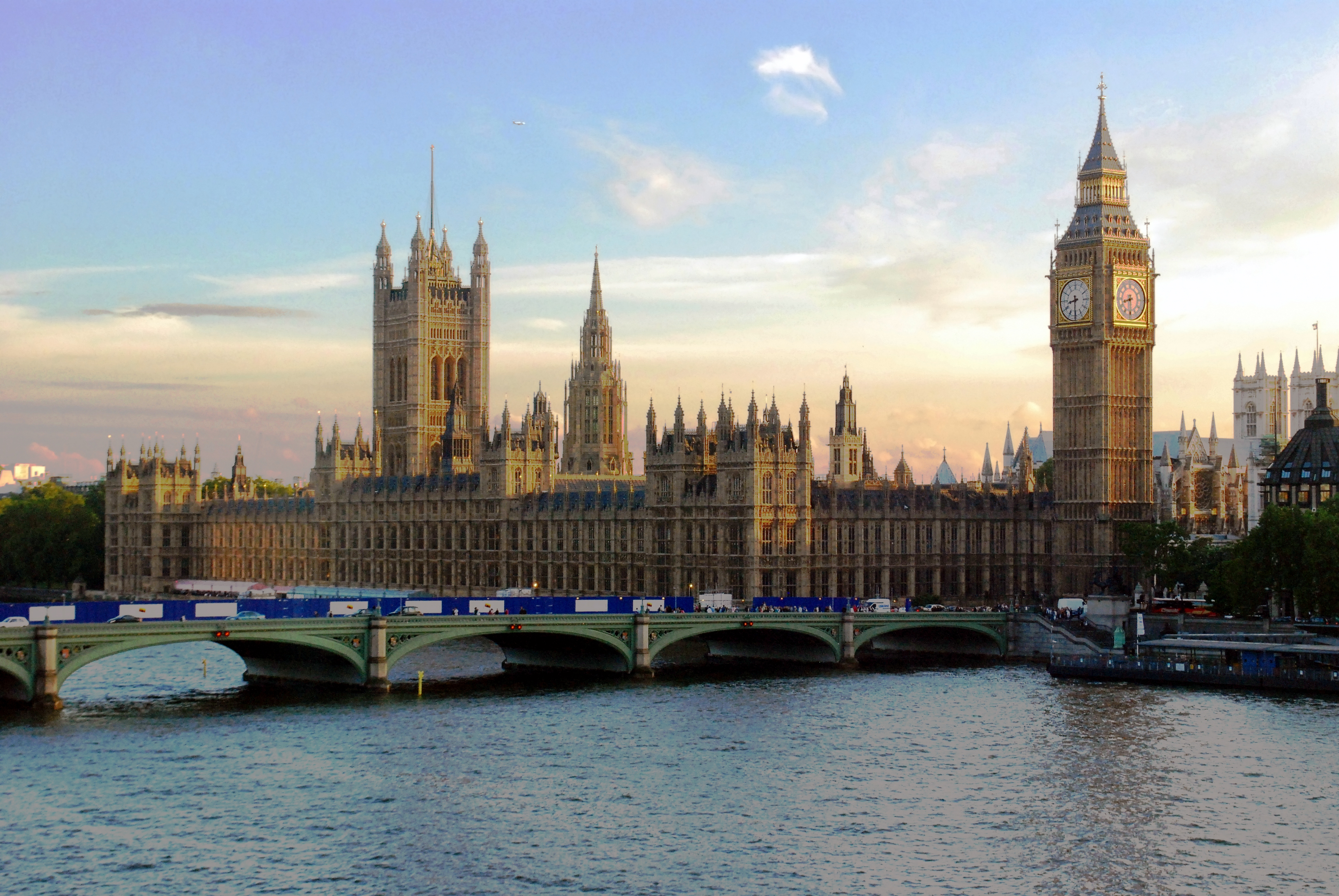
The Lord High Steward, the Lord Chancellor, the Lord Great Chamberlain and the Earl Marshal all hold duties pertaining to Parliament, especially within the House of Lords.

The office was originally held by the Earls of Oxford. Later, however, the Chamberlainship came to be inherited by the Earl of Lindsey and then his multiple heirs, who later became the Dukes of Ancaster and Kesteven. The 3rd Duke left two daughters as heirs. The House of Lords ruled that the two sisters were jointly Lord Great Chamberlain and could appoint a Deputy to fulfil the functions of the office. The same ruling was applied in 1902 for the then joint office holders, the 1st Earl of Ancaster, the 4th Marquess of Cholmondeley, and the 1st Earl Carrington. In 1912 an agreement was reached that the office should rotate every reign amongst themselves and their heirs, with the Cholmondeleys serving every other reign, and the heirs of Ancaster and Carrington every four reigns each.

The House of Lords Act 1999 removed the automatic right of hereditary peers to sit in the House of Lords, but the Act provided that the Lord Great Chamberlain and the Earl Marshal be exempt from such a rule, so that they may continue to carry out their ceremonial functions in the House.

=== Lord High Constable ===
The Lord High Constable (formally the Lord High Constable of England) was the commander of the royal armies and the Master of the Horse and, in conjunction with the Earl Marshal, president of the Court of Chivalry or Court of Honour. The office was originally inherited by the Earls of Hereford, though it reverted to the Crown in 1512 on the attainder of Edward Stafford, 3rd Duke of Buckingham, and is now reinstated only for the day of a coronation (where he commands the whole of the coronation troops). The Earl Marshal of England assumed the place of the Constable in the royal palace in the command of the royal armies.

The office of Earl Marshal has been held by the Dukes of Norfolk since 1672. As a symbol of office, the Earl Marshal carries a baton of gold with black finish at each end, represented in saltire behind the Duke's coat of arms.

=== Earl Marshal ===
The Earl Marshal (formally the Earl Marshal and Hereditary Marshal of England), held in conjunction with the office Marshal of England, was originally responsible for the monarch's horses and stables, as well as taking charge over the royal armies; these duties were shared with the Constable. His duties evolved to ceremonial responsibilities in regard to the organisation of major ceremonial state occasions, most notably coronations, state funerals, and the State Opening of Parliament.

The Earl Marshal also remains to have charge over the College of Arms, and issues warrants for the grant of arms in England, Wales and Ireland. His Majesty's High Court of Chivalry, with jurisdiction over all matters relating to heraldry, is presided over by the Earl Marshal.

=== Lord High Admiral ===
The Lord High Admiral (formally the Lord High Admiral of the United Kingdom) is the ceremonial head of the Royal Navy, holding no command at sea but, rather, jurisdiction over maritime affairs, including courts. The office is vested in the Crown, who may otherwise dispense it to other individuals (mainly members of the Royal Family), or put it under commission, notably when it was held by the Board of Admiralty, from 1708 to 1964.

== Scotland ==
The term "officer of state" is sometimes used loosely of any great office under the Crown. As in England, many offices are hereditary. A number of historical offices ended at, or soon after, the Treaty of Union 1707. There are also a number of Officers of the Crown and Great Officers of the Royal Household. These Officers of State were also called "Officers of the Crown" despite there being a separate group of officers so named that are not officers of state and, unlike the officers of state, did not sit or vote in meetings.

=== Officers of State ===
Order	Office	Holder during 1707	Current holder	Notes
Greater Officers of State
1	Lord High Chancellor of Scotland	James Ogilvy; 1st Earl of Seafield	—	Merged with Lord High Chancellor of England in 1701 to form the office of Lord High Chancellor of Great Britain.
2	Lord High Treasurer of Scotland (Lord High Treasurer, Comptroller, Collector-General and Treasurer of the New Augmentation)	In commission: Commissioners of the Treasury of Scotland — James Ogilvy; 1st Earl of Seafield (Lord High Chancellor); David Boyle; 1st Earl of Glasgow (Treasurer-depute); The Honourable; Francis Montgomerie (Treasurer in Parliament)	—	Merged with Lord High Treasurer of England in 1701 to form the office of Lord High Treasurer of Great Britain.
3	Lord Keeper of the Privy Seal of Scotland	James Douglas; 2nd Duke of Queensberry	—	Vacant since the death of Gavin Campbell, 1st Marquess of Breadalbane in 1921.
4	Lord Secretary of Scotland (Secretary of State for Scotland)	Hugh Campbell; 3rd Earl of Loudoun; John Erskine; 23rd and 6th Earl of Mar	—	Office abolished in 1709.
Lesser Officers of State
5	Lord Clerk Register	David Boyle; 1st Earl of Glasgow	Lady Elish Angiolini	Since 1817, also Keeper of the Signet in Scotland.
6	Lord Advocate (His Majesty's (Lord) (Note: The office of Lord Advocate is referred to as His Majesty's Lord Advocate in formal correspondence, though 'Lord' is dropped in some cases, such as case citations (for example, in [2020] UKSC 10, the office is referred to as His Majesty's Advocate, without 'Lord').) Advocate)	Sir James Stewart	Ruth Charteris	—
7	Lord Treasurer-depute	David Boyle; 1st Earl of Glasgow	—	Office abolished by the Acts of Union 1707.
8	Lord Justice Clerk	Adam Cockburn; Lord Ormiston	John Beckett; Lord Beckett	—
Abolished Officers of State
n/a	Comptroller of Scotland	—	—	Merged into the office of Lord High Treasurer of Scotland.
n/a	Master of Requests for Scotland	—	—	Merged into the office of Lord Secretary of Scotland.

=== Officers of the Crown ===
Order	Office	Current holder	Notes
1	Lord President of the Council of Scotland	—	Privy Council of Scotland abolished in 1708.
2	Lord High Chamberlain of Scotland	—	Resigned to the Crown by Charles Lennox, 1st Duke of Richmond, in 1703.
3	Lord High Steward of Scotland	Prince William; The Duke of Rothesay as Prince and Great Steward of Scotland	Merged with the office of Lord Steward, and later with the Crown when Robert II inherited the throne of Scotland; re-granted to the heir apparent, now the Duke of Cornwall. Previously this was Charles, Prince of Wales; however, the death of Queen Elizabeth II on 8 September 2022 resulted in the accession of the Prince of Wales as King Charles III.
4	Lord High Constable of Scotland	Merlin Hay; 24th Earl of Erroll	Held by the Hay family of Erroll since the 12th century.
5	Knight Marischal of Scotland	—	Vacant since the death of William Hamilton, 11th Duke of Hamilton, in 1863.
6	Earl Marischal of Scotland	—	Office was forfeited by George Keith, 10th Earl Marischal, in 1716.
— (Note: Number is unknown; sources are unclear on the matter.)	Lord High Admiral of Scotland		Resigned to the Crown by Charles Lennox, 1st Duke of Richmond, in 1703, and abolished in 1707, with the last holder, David Wemyss, 4th Earl of Wemyss, becoming Vice Admiral of Scotland.
—	Keeper of the Great Seal of Scotland	John Swinney; MSP for Perthshire North	Held by the Secretary of State for Scotland (1926–1999) and, since 1999, by the First Minister.

=== History ===
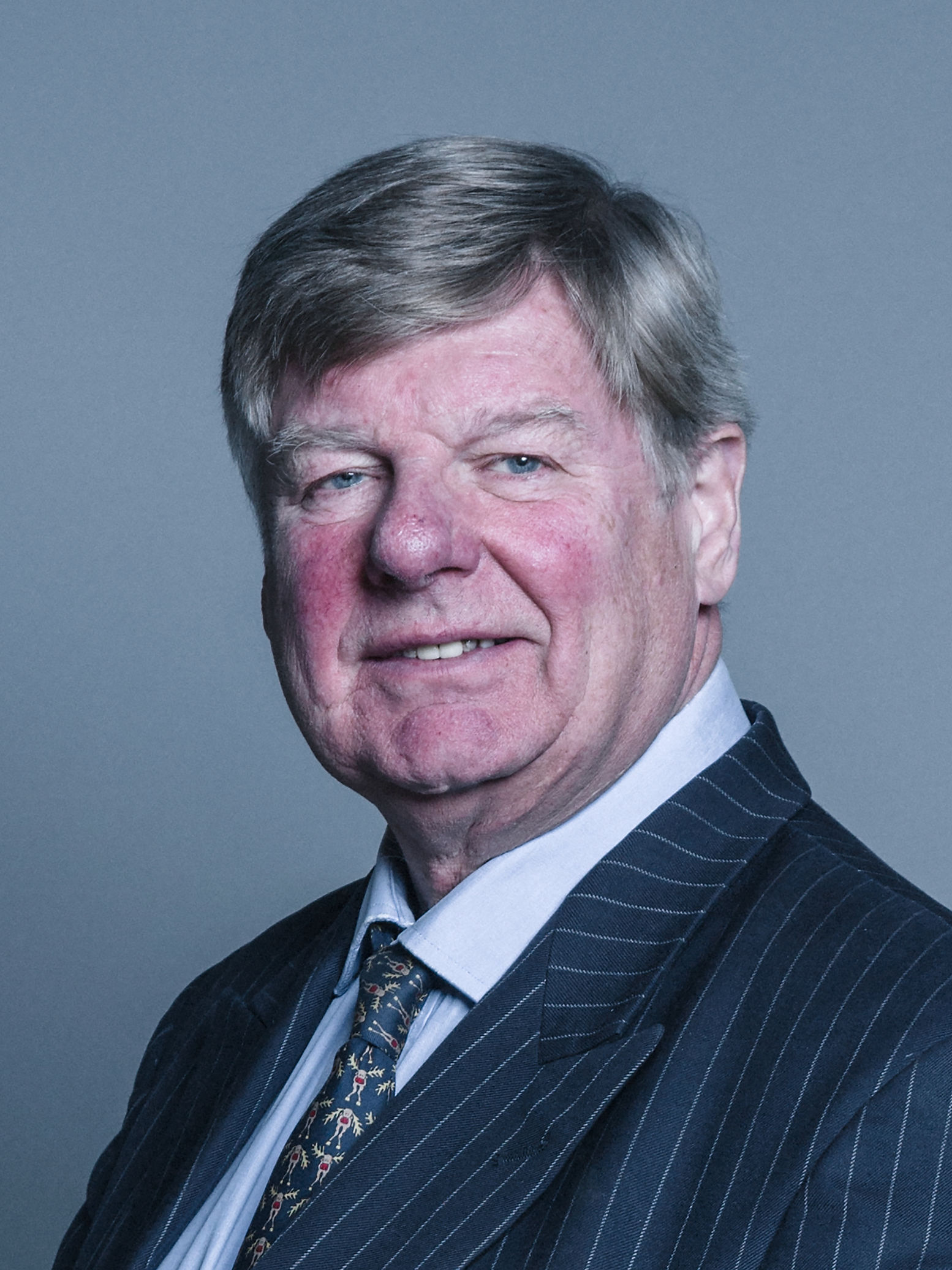
The Earls of Erroll have held the office of Lord High Constable of Scotland since 1309: the current holder is the 24th Earl, Merlin Hay

After the abolition of the Mayor of the Palace, France established seven officers of the crown (ordered by rank): the high constable, the high admiral, the high or great chancellor, the great justiciar, the great chamberlain, the great protonotary, and the great steward or seneschal. These offices were duplicated in the Kingdom of Scotland. By the time of King Malcolm II, the great protonotary was extinct and the great justiciar was replaced by the Lord Justice General.

The post of High Constable is held by the Earls of Erroll. Originally, the heads of the Keith family held the office of Earl Marischal but, in 1716, the holder was attainted for treason, and the office has not been re-granted. The Dukes of Argyll are the Hereditary Masters of the Household. All other officers are Crown appointments. Many of these offices, though originally associated with political power, are now only ceremonial.

The remaining officers are related to Scotland's judiciary. The Lord Justice General was originally an important noble, though in the 19th century the office was combined with that of Lord President of the Court of Session. Now, the Lord Justice General is the head of Scotland's judiciary. The Lord Clerk Register is an officer with miscellaneous functions that include conducting the elections of Scottish representative peers, and registering births and deaths. The Lord Advocate is at the head of the law offices of Scotland; all prosecutors act in his/her name. The Lord Justice Clerk serves as a deputy of the Lord Justice General. Finally, the Lord Lyon King of Arms is the sole judge in the Lyon Court, which determines cases relating to heraldry.

Prior to the Union of 1707 there were eight officers of state: four greater officers, and four lesser officers. This was limited by an act of parliament, such that two officers of state, Comptroller and Master of Requests, were merged with Lord High Treasurer and Lord Secretary respectively. The greater officers were the Lord High Chancellor, Lord High Treasurer, Lord Privy Seal and Lord Secretary; the lesser officers were the Lord Clerk Register, Lord Advocate, Lord Treasurer-depute and Lord Justice Clerk, with the Lord Clerk Register the only one fixed in precedency.

A number of offices ended at, or soon after, the Union of 1707. These include the High Chancellor, the High Treasurer, the Secretary of Scotland, the Treasurer-depute, the President of the Privy Council, and the High Admiral of Scotland.

== See also ==
- Great Officers of State
- Lord Warden of the Cinque Ports
- Garter Principal King of Arms
- College of Arms
- Lord Lyon King of Arms
