= Lord Great Chamberlain =

Great Officer of State for England

Lord Great Chamberlain of England
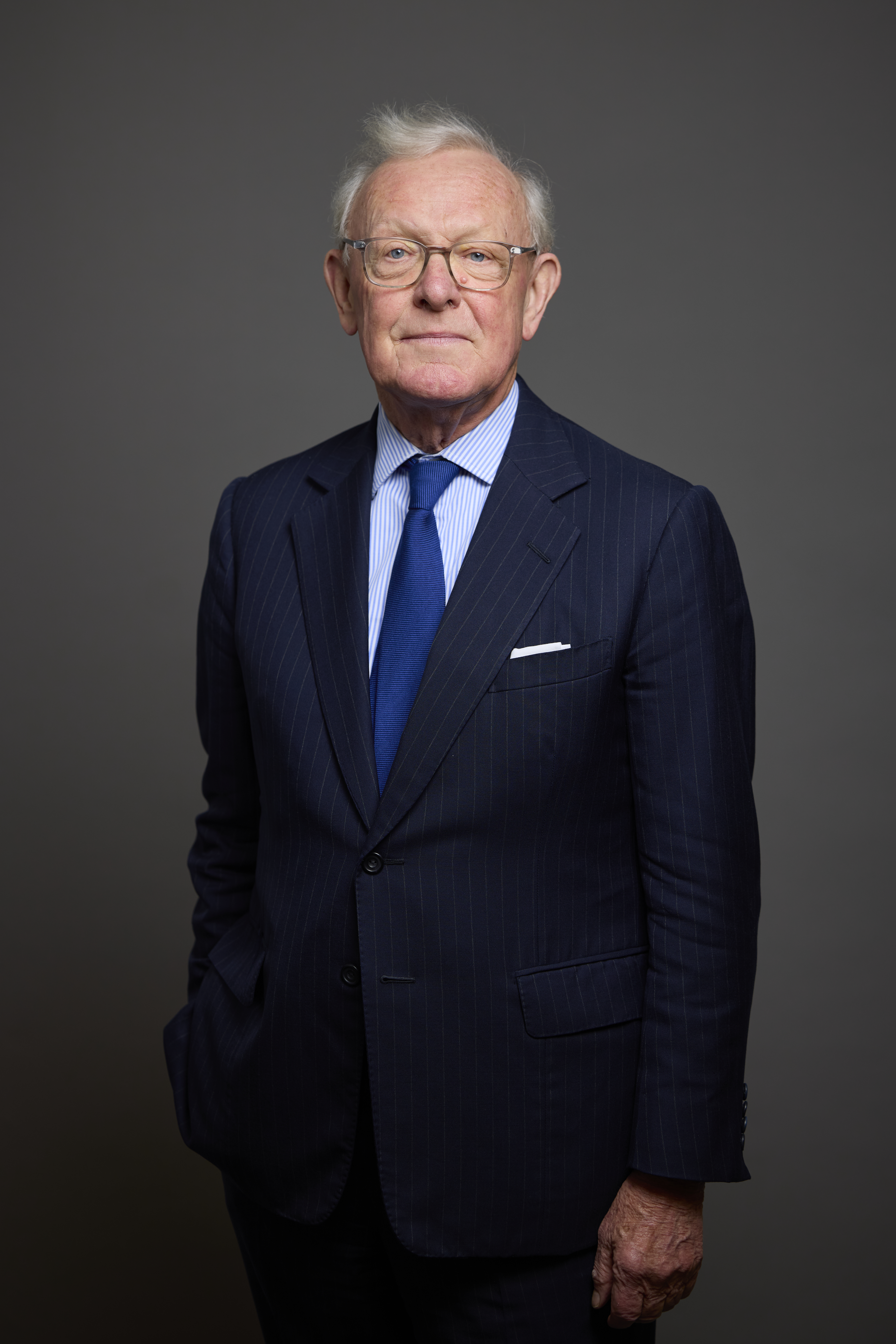
- Incumbent; Rupert Carington, 7th Baron Carrington since 8 September 2022 Joint hereditary officeholders: Cholmondeley share: The 7th Marquess of Cholmondeley (50%); Ancaster share: The 28th Baroness Willoughby de Eresby (25%); Carrington share: The 10th Earl of Albemarle (5%); Nicholas Llewellen Palmer (5%); Harry Legge-Bourke (5%); Lorraine Wilson (1.66%); Tatiana Dent (1.66%); Ines Garton (1.66%); The 8th Marquess of Donegall (1%); Jan Witold Kwiatkowski (1%); Mark Hamilton-Russell (1%); Christopher Findlay (1%); Michael Basset (1%); Last updated 14 February 2025
- Style: The Right Honourable
- Type: Great Officer of State
- Appointer: The Monarch
- Term length: At His Majesty's pleasure
- Formation: c. 1126
- First holder: Robert Malet
- Superseded by: Lord High Treasurer (in monetary affairs)
- Succession: Hereditary
- Salary: Unpaid

The Lord Great Chamberlain of England is the sixth of the Great Officers of State, ranking beneath the lord privy seal but above the lord high constable. The office of Lord Great Chamberlain was first created around 1126 and has been in continuous existence since 1138. The incumbent is Rupert Carington, 7th Baron Carrington.

== Duties ==
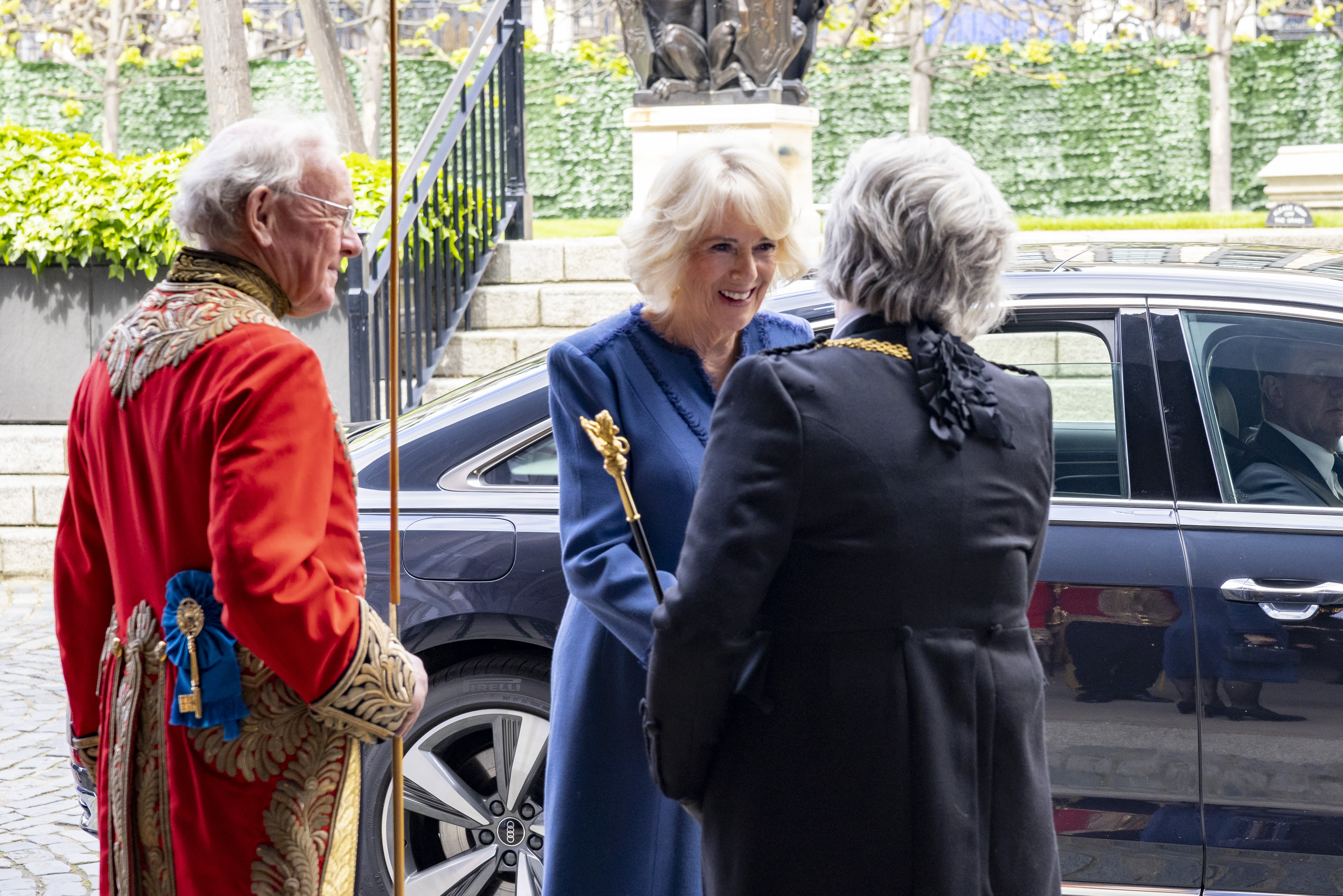
The Lord Great Chamberlain, Lord Carrington, on the occasion of a royal visit to the Palace of Westminster in 2023 (wearing his scarlet court uniform with gold key insignia and carrying his wand of office).

The Lord Great Chamberlain is entrusted by the Sovereign with custody of the Palace of Westminster, the seat of the British Parliament, and serves as his representative therein. From the Restoration until 1963, the Lord Great Chamberlain was responsible for physical plant and facility management throughout the Palace of Westminster, in effect serving as a property manager for the entire parliamentary estate. Today, the Lord Great Chamberlain enjoys plenary jurisdiction in those precincts of the Palace of Westminster not assigned to either the House of Lords or the House of Commons: namely, the Royal Apartments, Central Lobby, and the Crypt Chapel. To this end, the Lord Great Chamberlain is responsible for the use, preservation, and occupation of such spaces. In addition, the Lord Great Chamberlain is one of the three commissioners who exercise joint control and maintenance over Westminster Hall; the other commissioners are the Lord Speaker of the House of Lords and the Speaker of the House of Commons.

The Lord Great Chamberlain performs other less routine functions as custodian of the Palace of Westminster. For example, the Lord Great Chamberlain welcomes foreign heads of state visiting the Palace of Westminster. Likewise, the Lord Great Chamberlain is responsible for attending upon the Sovereign and other members of the British royal family whenever any one of them is present on the parliamentary estate. In the latter case, the Lord Great Chamberlain is authorised to make any administrative arrangements necessary for delivery of services required by the Sovereign and their family.

However, the Lord Great Chamberlain's most publicly visible parliamentary role is organising state openings of Parliament. In making the necessary arrangements, the Lord Great Chamberlain is assisted by Black Rod and consults the Earl Marshal, who is responsible for preparing the Order of Ceremonial distributed to attendees and martialing the Sovereign's procession. On the day of the state opening, the Lord Great Chamberlain receives the Sovereign at the Norman Porch, enrobes him or her with the Robe of State and the Imperial State Crown in the Robing Room, and participates in the Sovereign's procession through the Royal Gallery and the Prince's Chamber into the Lords Chamber. It is also the Lord Great Chamberlain who, upon the command of the Sovereign, directs Black Rod to summon members of the House of Commons to attend the House of Lords for the purpose of hearing the speech from the throne.

Parliamentary responsibilities aside, the Lord Great Chamberlain also has a major part to play in royal coronations, having the right to dress the monarch on coronation day and to serve the monarch water before and after the coronation banquet. Likewise, the Lord Great Chamberlain invests the monarch with the insignia of rule during the coronation service. On state occasions like coronations, the Lord Great Chamberlain wears a distinctive scarlet court uniform and bears a gold key and a white staff as the insignia of his office.

The office of Lord Great Chamberlain is distinct from the non-hereditary office of Lord Chamberlain of the Household, a position in the monarch's household. This office arose in the 14th century as a deputy of the Lord Great Chamberlain to fulfil the latter's duties in the Royal Household, but now they are quite distinct.

The House of Lords Act 1999 removed the automatic right of hereditary peers to sit in the House of Lords, but the Act provided that a hereditary peer exercising the office of Lord Great Chamberlain (as well as the Earl Marshal) be exempt from such a rule, in order to perform ceremonial functions. Further reforms in the House of Lords (Hereditary Peers) Act 2026 removed the right to sit and vote from all remaining hereditary peers, while retaining the ceremonial functions of these two officeholders.

== Succession ==
The position is a hereditary one, held since 1780 in gross. At any one time, no single person actually exercises the office of Lord Great Chamberlain. The various individuals who hold fractions of the office are properly each Joint Hereditary Lord Great Chamberlain. They choose one individual of the rank of a knight or higher to be the Deputy Lord Great Chamberlain. Under an agreement made in 1912, the right to exercise the office for a given reign rotates among three families (of the then three joint office holders) in proportion to the fraction of the office held. For instance, the Marquesses of Cholmondeley hold one-half of the office, and may therefore exercise the office or appoint a deputy every alternate reign. Whenever one of the three shares of the 1912 agreement is split further, the joint heirs of this share have to agree among each other, who should be their deputy or any mechanism to determine who of them has the right to choose a deputy.

== History of the office ==
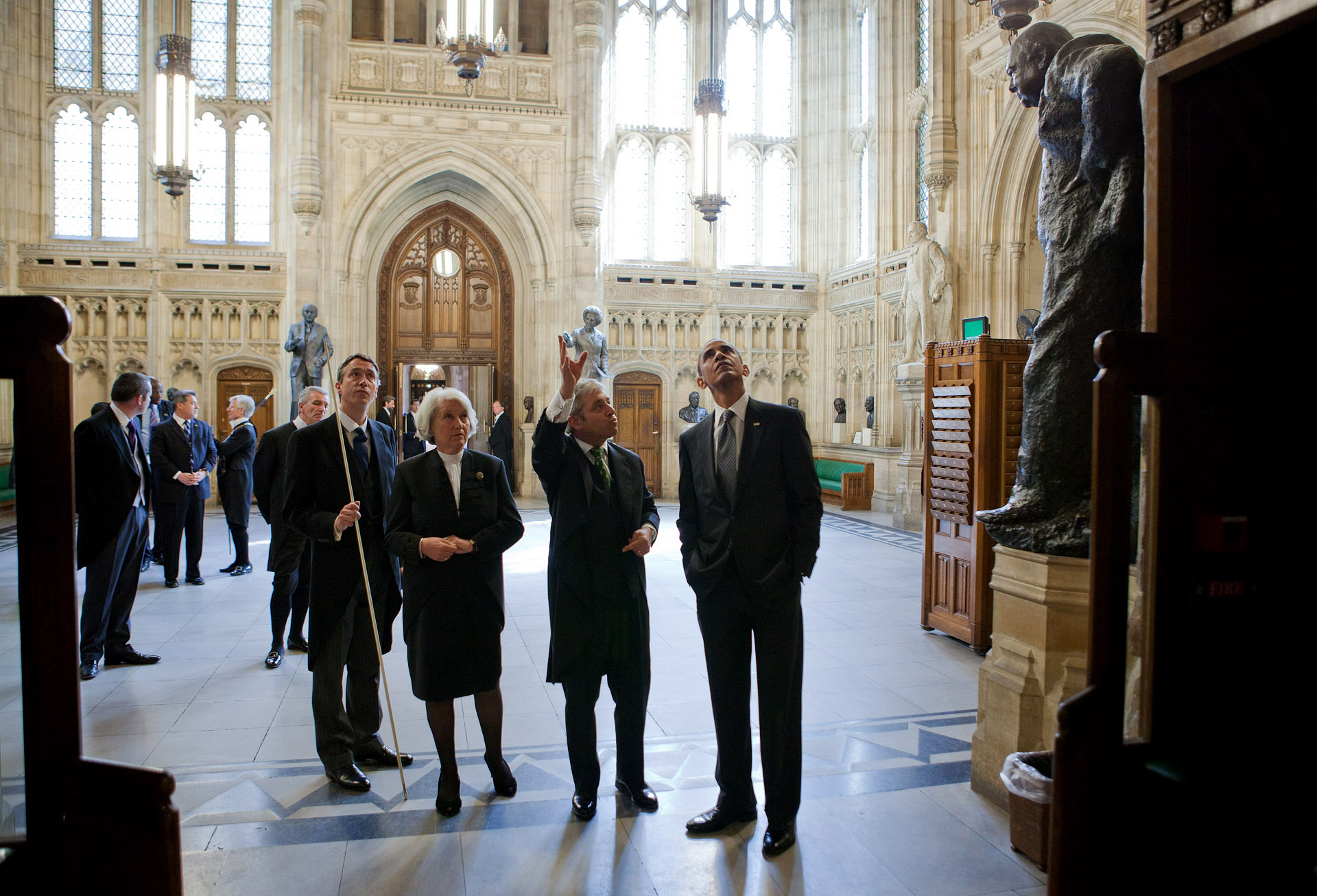
The Lord Great Chamberlain, the 7th Marquess of Cholmondeley (left), holding his white staff of office; the Lord Speaker, Baroness Hayman; and the Speaker of the House of Commons, John Bercow, showing US President Barack Obama around Members' Lobby during a tour of the Palace in May 2011.

The office was originally held by Robert Malet, a son of one of the leading companions of William the Conqueror. In 1133, however, Henry I declared Malet's estates and titles forfeit, and awarded the office of Lord Great Chamberlain to Aubrey de Vere, whose son was created Earl of Oxford. Thereafter, the Earls of Oxford held the title almost continuously until 1526, with a few intermissions due to the forfeiture of some earls for treason. In 1526, however, John de Vere, 14th Earl of Oxford died, leaving his aunts as his heirs. The earldom was inherited by a more distant heir-male, his second cousin. Henry VIII then decreed that the office belonged to the Crown, and was not transmitted along with the earldom. The King appointed John de Vere, 15th Earl of Oxford to the office, but the appointment was deemed for life and was not hereditary. The family's association with the office was interrupted in 1540, when the 15th Earl died and Thomas Cromwell, the King's chief adviser, was appointed Lord Great Chamberlain. After Cromwell's attainder and execution later the same year, the office passed through a few more court figures, until 1553, when it was passed back to the de Vere family to John de Vere, 16th Earl of Oxford, again as an uninheritable life appointment. Later, Mary I ruled that the Earls of Oxford were indeed entitled to the office of Lord Great Chamberlain on an hereditary basis.

Thus, the sixteenth, seventeenth and eighteenth Earls of Oxford held the position on a hereditary basis until 1626, when Henry de Vere, 18th Earl of Oxford died, again leaving a distant relative as heir male, but a closer one as a female heir. The House of Lords eventually ruled that the office belonged to the heir general, Robert Bertie, 14th Baron Willoughby de Eresby, who later became Earl of Lindsey. The office remained vested in the Earls of Lindsey, who later became Dukes of Ancaster and Kesteven.

In 1779, however, Robert Bertie, 4th Duke of Ancaster and Kesteven died, leaving two sisters as female heirs, and an uncle as an heir male. The uncle became the 5th and last Duke, but the House of Lords ruled that the two sisters were jointly Lord Great Chamberlain and could appoint a Deputy to fulfil the functions of the office. The barony of Willoughby de Eresby fell into abeyance between the two sisters, but George III terminated the abeyance and granted the title to the elder sister, Priscilla Bertie, 21st Baroness Willoughby de Eresby. The office of Lord Great Chamberlain, however, was divided between Priscilla and her younger sister Georgiana. Priscilla's share was eventually split between two of her granddaughters, and has been split several more times since then. By contrast, Georgiana's share has been inherited by a single male heir each time; that individual has in each case been the Marquess of Cholmondeley, a title created for Georgiana's husband.

=== 20th and 21st centuries ===
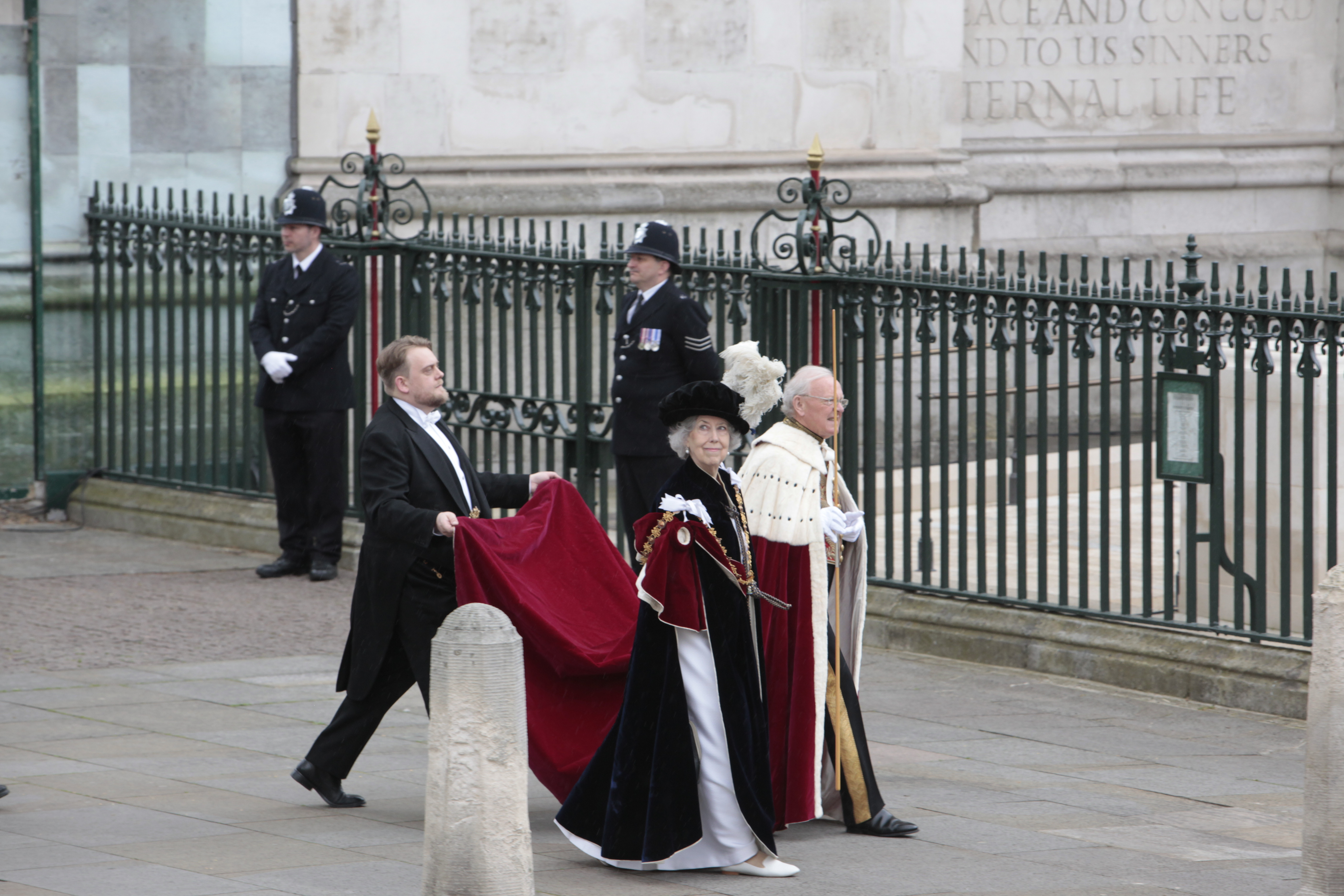
6 May 2023: Lord Carrington (Lord Great Chamberlain since 2022) on his way to the Coronation of Charles III and Camilla (with Baroness Manningham Buller).

In 1902 it was ruled by the House of Lords that the then joint office holders (Gilbert Heathcote-Drummond-Willoughby, 1st Earl of Ancaster, George Cholmondeley, 4th Marquess of Cholmondeley, and Charles Wynn-Carington, 1st Earl Carrington, later Marquess of Lincolnshire) had to agree on a deputy to exercise the office, subject to the approval of the Sovereign. Should there be no such agreement, the Sovereign should appoint a deputy until an agreement be reached.

In 1912 an agreement was reached. The office, or right to appoint the person to exercise the office, would thereafter rotate among the three joint office holders and their heirs after them, changing at the start of each successive reign. Cholmondeley and his heirs would serve in every other reign; Ancaster and Carrington would each serve once in four reigns.

As the Cholmondeley share and the Ancaster share (held since 1983 by Jane Heathcote-Drummond-Willoughby, 28th Baroness Willoughby de Eresby) are not further split, each of these holders decides in his or her turn to act as Lord Great Chamberlain or to name a person who will act as Lord Great Chamberlain. The Carrington share was divided at his death among his five daughters and their heirs, and has since been further divided, with 11 people holding shares as of September 2022. At accession of Charles III the turn fell to the Carrington heirs who named their cousin Rupert Carington, 7th Baron Carrington, to act as Lord Great Chamberlain. Being descended from the Earl's younger brother he himself has no share of the office.

On 6 May 2023, the Lord Great Chamberlain presented spurs to King Charles III as part of Charles' coronation. Spurs are included among the first English coronation ornaments and were presented in the coronation of Richard I in 1189.

== Lord Great Chamberlains, 1130–1779 ==
Portrait	Name	Term of office		Monarch (reign)
	Robert Malet	1130	1133	Henry I (1100–1135)
	Aubrey de Vere II	1133	1141	Henry I (1100–1135)
	Aubrey de Vere II	1133	1141	Stephen (1135–1154)
	Aubrey de Vere; 1st Earl of Oxford	1141	1194	Stephen (1135–1154)
	Aubrey de Vere; 1st Earl of Oxford	1141	1194	Henry II (1154–1189)
	Aubrey de Vere; 1st Earl of Oxford	1141	1194	Richard I (1189–1199)
	Aubrey de Vere; 2nd Earl of Oxford	1194	1214	Richard I (1189–1199)
	Aubrey de Vere; 2nd Earl of Oxford	1194	1214	John (1199–1216)
	Robert de Vere; 3rd Earl of Oxford	1214	1221	John (1199–1216)
	Robert de Vere; 3rd Earl of Oxford	1214	1221	Henry III (1216–1272)
	Hugh de Vere; 4th Earl of Oxford	1221	1263	Henry III (1216–1272)
	Robert de Vere; 5th Earl of Oxford	1263	1265	Henry III (1216–1272)
	unclear, perhaps vacant	1265	1267	Henry III (1216–1272)
	unclear, perhaps again Robert de Vere; 5th Earl of Oxford	1267	1296	Henry III (1216–1272)
	unclear, perhaps again Robert de Vere; 5th Earl of Oxford	1267	1296	Edward I (1272–1307)
	Robert de Vere; 6th Earl of Oxford	1296	1331	Edward I (1272–1307)
	Robert de Vere; 6th Earl of Oxford	1296	1331	Edward II (1307–1327)
	Robert de Vere; 6th Earl of Oxford	1296	1331	Edward III (1327–1377)
	John de Vere; 7th Earl of Oxford	1331	1360	Edward III (1327–1377)
	Thomas de Vere; 8th Earl of Oxford	1360	1371	Edward III (1327–1377)
	Robert de Vere; Duke of Ireland	1371	1388	Edward III (1327–1377)
	Robert de Vere; Duke of Ireland	1371	1388	Richard II (1377–1399)
	John Holland; 1st Duke of Exeter	1389	1399	Richard II (1377–1399)
	Aubrey de Vere; 10th Earl of Oxford	1399	1400	Henry IV (1399–1413)
	Richard de Vere; 11th Earl of Oxford	1400	1417	Henry IV (1399–1413)
	Richard de Vere; 11th Earl of Oxford	1400	1417	Henry V (1413–1422)
	John de Vere; 12th Earl of Oxford	1417	1462	Henry V (1413–1422)
	John de Vere; 12th Earl of Oxford	1417	1462	Henry VI (1422–1461)
	John de Vere; 12th Earl of Oxford	1417	1462	Edward IV (1461–1470)
	John de Vere; 13th Earl of Oxford	1462	1464	Edward IV (1461–1470)
	Richard Neville; 16th Earl of Warwick	1464	1471	Edward IV (1461–1470)
	Richard Neville; 16th Earl of Warwick	1464	1471	Henry VI (1470–1471)
	unclear	1471	1475	Edward IV (1471–1483)
	Henry Percy; 4th Earl of Northumberland	1475	1485	Edward IV (1471–1483)
	Henry Percy; 4th Earl of Northumberland	1475	1485	Edward V (1483)
	Henry Percy; 4th Earl of Northumberland	1475	1485	Richard III (1483–1485)
	John de Vere; 13th Earl of Oxford	1485	1513	Henry VII (1485–1509)
	John de Vere; 13th Earl of Oxford	1485	1513	Henry VIII (1509–1547)
	John de Vere; 14th Earl of Oxford	1513	1526	Henry VIII (1509–1547)
	John de Vere; 15th Earl of Oxford	1526	1540	Henry VIII (1509–1547)
	Thomas Cromwell; 1st Earl of Essex	1540	1540	Henry VIII (1509–1547)
	Robert Radcliffe; 1st Earl of Sussex	1540	1542	Henry VIII (1509–1547)
	Edward Seymour; 1st Duke of Somerset	1543	1547	Henry VIII (1509–1547)
	John Dudley; 1st Duke of Northumberland	1547	1549	Edward VI (1547–1553)
	William Parr; 1st Marquess of Northampton	1549	1553	Edward VI (1547–1553)
	John de Vere; 16th Earl of Oxford	1553	1562	Mary I (1553–1558)
	John de Vere; 16th Earl of Oxford	1553	1562	Elizabeth I (1558–1603)
	Edward de Vere; 17th Earl of Oxford	1562	1604	Elizabeth I (1558–1603)
	Edward de Vere; 17th Earl of Oxford	1562	1604	James I (1603–1625)
	Henry de Vere; 18th Earl of Oxford	1604	1625	James I (1603–1625)
	Robert Bertie; 1st Earl of Lindsay	1625	1642	Charles I (1625–1649)
	Montagu Bertie; 2nd Earl of Lindsay	1642	1666	Charles I (1625–1649)
	Montagu Bertie; 2nd Earl of Lindsay	1642	1666	Interregnum (1649–1660)
	Montagu Bertie; 2nd Earl of Lindsay	1642	1666	Charles II (1660–1685)
	Robert Bertie; 3rd Earl of Lindsay	1666	1701	Charles II (1660–1685)
	Robert Bertie; 3rd Earl of Lindsay	1666	1701	James II (1685–1688)
	Robert Bertie; 3rd Earl of Lindsay	1666	1701	Mary II (1689–1694); William III (1689–1702)
	Robert Bertie; 1st Duke of Ancaster and Kesteven	1701	1723	Mary II (1689–1694); William III (1689–1702)
	Robert Bertie; 1st Duke of Ancaster and Kesteven	1701	1723	Anne (1702–1714)
	Robert Bertie; 1st Duke of Ancaster and Kesteven	1701	1723	George I (1714–1727)
	Peregrine Bertie; 2nd Duke of Ancaster and Kesteven	1723	1742	George I (1714–1727)
	Peregrine Bertie; 2nd Duke of Ancaster and Kesteven	1723	1742	George II (1727–1760)
	Peregrine Bertie; 3rd Duke of Ancaster and Kesteven	1742	1778	George II (1727–1760)
	Peregrine Bertie; 3rd Duke of Ancaster and Kesteven	1742	1778	George III (1760–1820)
	Robert Bertie; 4th Duke of Ancaster and Kesteven	1778	1779	George III (1760–1820)

== Joint hereditary Lord Great Chamberlains, 1780–present ==
The fractions show the holder's share in the office, and the date they held it. The current (as of 2022) holders of the office are shown in bold face.

Joint hereditary Lord Great Chamberlains, 1780–present

Peregrine Bertie, 3rd Duke of Ancaster and Kesteven
Priscilla Bertie, 21st Baroness Willoughby de Eresby; 1/2 1780–1828	Georgiana Cholmondeley, Marchioness of Cholmondeley; 1/2 1780–1838
Peter Drummond-Burrell, 22nd Baron Willoughby de Eresby; 1/2 1828–1865	George Cholmondeley, 2nd Marquess of Cholmondeley; 1/2 1838–1870	William Cholmondeley, 3rd Marquess of Cholmondeley; 1/2 1870–1884
Albyric Drummond-Willoughby, 23rd Baron Willoughby de Eresby; 1/2 1865–1870	Clementina Drummond-Willoughby, 24th Baroness Willoughby de Eresby; 1/4 1870–1888	Charlotte Augusta Carrington, Lady Carrington; 1/4 1870–1879	Charles George Cholmondeley
Gilbert Heathcote-Drummond-Willoughby, 1st Earl of Ancaster; 1/4 1888–1910	Charles Wynn-Carington, 1st Marquess of Lincolnshire; 1/4 1879–1928	George Cholmondeley, 4th Marquess of Cholmondeley; 1/2 1884–1923
Gilbert Heathcote-Drummond-Willoughby, 2nd Earl of Ancaster; 1/4 1910–1951	Marjorie Wilson, Baroness Nunburnholme; 1/20 1928–1968	Lady Alexandra Llewellen Palmer; 1/20 1928–1955	Ruperta Legge, Countess of Dartmouth; 1/20 1928–1963	Judith Keppel, Countess of Albemarle	Lady Victoria Weld-Forester; 1/20 1928–1966	George Cholmondeley, 5th Marquess of Cholmondeley; 1/2 1923–1968
James Heathcote-Drummond-Willoughby, 3rd Earl of Ancaster; 1/4 1951–1983	Charles Wilson, 3rd Baron Nunburnholme; 1/20 1968–1974	Brig. Anthony Llewellen Palmer; 1/20 1955–1990	Col. Charles Timothy Llewellen Palmer	Lady Mary Findlay; 1/100 1963–2003	Lady Elizabeth Basset; 1/100 1963–2000	Lady Diana Matthews; 1/100 1963–1970	Lady Barbara Kwiatkowska; 1/100 1963–2013	Josceline Chichester, Marchioness of Donegall; 1/100 1963–1995	Derek Keppel, Viscount Bury; 1/20 1928–1968	Sir Henry Legge-Bourke; 1/20 1966–1973	Hugh Cholmondeley, 6th Marquess of Cholmondeley; 1/2 1968–1990
**Jane Heathcote-Drummond-Willoughby, 28th Baroness Willoughby de Eresby**; 1/4 1983–present	Ben Wilson, 4th Baron Nunburnholme; 1/20 1974–1998	Julian Llewellen Palmer; 1/20 1990–2002	Cdr Jonathan Findlay; 1/100 2003–2015	Bryan Basset; 1/100 2000–2010	Col James Hamilton-Russell; 1/100 1970–2025	**Jan Witold Kwiatkowski**; 1/100 2013–present	**Patrick Chichester, 8th Marquess of Donegall**; 1/100 1995–present	**Rufus Keppel, 10th Earl of Albemarle**; 1/20 1968–present	William Legge-Bourke; 1/20 1973–2009	**David Cholmondeley, 7th Marquess of Cholmondeley**; 1/2 1990–present
The Hon. **Lorraine Wilson**; 1/80 1998–2022; 1/60 2022–present	The Hon. **Tatiana Dent**; 1/80 1998–2022; 1/60 2022–present	The Hon. **Ines Garton**; 1/80 1998–2022; 1/60 2022–present	The Hon. Ysabel Williams; 1/80 1998–2022	**Nicholas Llewellen Palmer**; 1/20 2002–present	**Christopher Findlay**; 1/100 2015–present	David Basset; 1/100 2010	**Michael James Basset**; 1/100 2010–present	**Mark Hamilton-Russell**; 1/100 2025-present	Capt. **Harry Legge-Bourke**; 1/20 2009–present

== Persons exercising the office of Lord Great Chamberlain, 1780–present ==
Portrait	Name	Term of office		Monarch (reign)
	Peter Burrell; 1st Baron Gwydyr	1780	1820	George III (1760–1820)
	Peter Burrell; 1st Baron Gwydyr	1780	1820	George IV (1820–1830)
	Peter Drummond-Burrell; 22nd Baron Willoughby de Eresby	1821	1830	George IV (1820–1830)
	George Cholmondeley; 2nd Marquess of Cholmondeley	1830	1837	William IV (1830–1837)
	Peter Drummond-Burrell; 22nd Baron Willoughby de Eresby	1837	1865	Victoria (1837–1901)
	Albyric Drummond-Willoughby; 23rd Baron Willoughby de Eresby	1865	1870	Victoria (1837–1901)
	Gilbert Heathcote-Drummond-Willoughby; 25th Baron Willoughby de Eresby	1871	1901	Victoria (1837–1901)
	George Cholmondeley; 4th Marquess of Cholmondeley	1901	1910	Edward VII (1901–1910)
	Charles Wynn-Carington; 1st Marquess of Lincolnshire	1910	1928	George V (1910–1936)
	William Legge; Viscount Lewisham	1928	1936	George V (1910–1936)
	George Cholmondeley; 5th Marquess of Cholmondeley	1936		Edward VIII (1936)
	Gilbert Heathcote-Drummond-Willoughby; 2nd Earl of Ancaster	1936	1951	George VI (1936–1952)
	James Heathcote-Drummond-Willoughby; 3rd Earl of Ancaster	1951	1952	George VI (1936–1952)
	George Cholmondeley; 5th Marquess of Cholmondeley	1952	1966	Elizabeth II (1952–2022)
	Hugh Cholmondeley; 6th Marquess of Cholmondeley	1966	1990	Elizabeth II (1952–2022)
	David Cholmondeley; 7th Marquess of Cholmondeley	1990	2022	Elizabeth II (1952–2022)
	Rupert Carington; 7th Baron Carrington	2022	present	Charles III (2022–present)
