= David Cholmondeley, 7th Marquess of Cholmondeley =

British filmmaker (born 1960)

The Most Honourable The Marquess of Cholmondeley GCVO DL
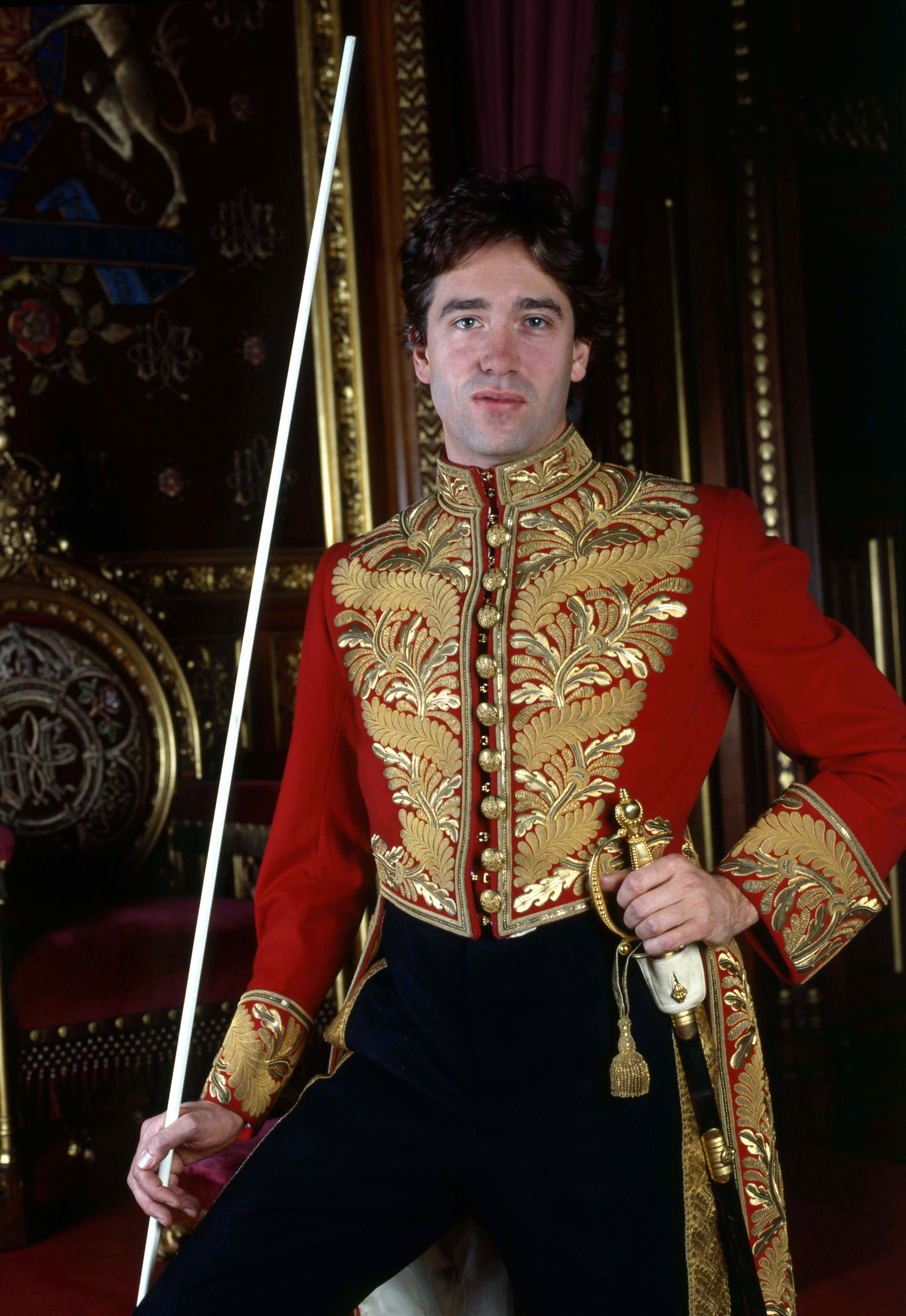
- Lord Cholmondeley at the Palace of Westminster in 1992, wearing the ceremonial dress of Lord Great Chamberlain and holding a white staff of office, borne by certain senior officers of Royal Households

Permanent Lord in Waiting
- Incumbent
- Assumed office 17 March 2023
- Monarch: Charles III

Lord Great Chamberlain
- In office 13 March 1990 – 8 September 2022
- Monarch: Elizabeth II
- Preceded by: The 6th Marquess of Cholmondeley
- Succeeded by: The 7th Baron Carrington

Member of the House of Lords
- Lord Temporal
- Hereditary peerage 8 May 1990 – 11 November 1999
- Preceded by: The 6th Marquess of Cholmondeley
- Succeeded by: Seat abolished
- Ex officio as Lord Great Chamberlain; 11 November 1999 – 8 September 2022
- Succeeded by: The 7th Baron Carrington

Personal details
- Born: David George Philip Cholmondeley; 27 June 1960 (age 66) Cholmondeley Castle, Malpas, Cheshire, England
- Spouse: Rose Hanbury (m. 2009)
- Children: Alexander Cholmondeley, Earl of Rocksavage; Lord Oliver Cholmondeley; Lady Iris Cholmondeley
- Parents: Hugh Cholmondeley, 6th Marquess of Cholmondeley; Lavinia Leslie
- Profession: Filmmaker, Estate Management

David George Philip Cholmondeley, 7th Marquess of Cholmondeley, GCVO, DL (/ˈtʃʌmli/ CHUM-lee; born 27 June 1960), styled Viscount Malpas from birth until 1968, and subsequently Earl of Rocksavage until 1990, is a British peer and filmmaker who served as Lord Great Chamberlain of England from 1990 to 2022.

== Early life and education ==
Lord Cholmondeley is a descendant of Sir Robert Walpole (1676–1745), the first Prime Minister of Great Britain. He is the son of Hugh Cholmondeley, 6th Marquess of Cholmondeley, and Lavinia, Marchioness of Cholmondeley (née Leslie). He is also a descendant of both the Rothschild family and the Sassoon family through his paternal grandmother, Sybil Sassoon. He has three older sisters: the Ladies Rose, Margot (previously married to Tony Huston), and Caroline (married to Baron Rodolphe d'Erlanger).

Like many members of his family, Cholmondeley was educated at Eton College. He later studied at the Sorbonne in Paris.

== Career ==
=== Film industry ===
Lord Cholmondeley is a filmmaker. As David Rocksavage, he also appeared in a small part in Eric Rohmer's film 4 aventures de Reinette et Mirabelle (1987). His professional name is derived from his title of Earl of Rocksavage.

He has made the following documentaries for television:

- 1979, The Gentlemen Factory, about Eton College, (co-directed with Simon Dewhurst), BBC2 and Rank cinemas.
- 1984, Madeleine Castaing, FR3
- 1986, Portrait of My Grandmother, Anglia TV

In 1995, he directed the film adaptation of Truman Capote's novel Other Voices, Other Rooms.

In 2007, he directed Shadows in the Sun, starring Jean Simmons and James Wilby, which was shot in Norfolk. The film was released in 2009.

=== Inherited title ===
Cholmondeley became Marquess of Cholmondeley on 13 March 1990, upon the death of his father. Cholmondeley also inherited a half share of the office of Lord Great Chamberlain, and succeeded his father in exercising the function of the office for the duration of Queen Elizabeth II's reign. As Lord Great Chamberlain, Cholmondeley was ex officio a member of the House of Lords and attended the House of Lords in his ceremonial role such as at the State Opening of Parliament, although he did not sit in the House of Lords for debates as he was on a leave of absence. Upon Queen Elizabeth II's death on 8 September 2022, Lord Cholmondeley ceased to be Lord Great Chamberlain and a member of the House of Lords, with the office of the Lord Great Chamberlain passing to Rupert Carington, 7th Baron Carrington.

== Lands and estates ==
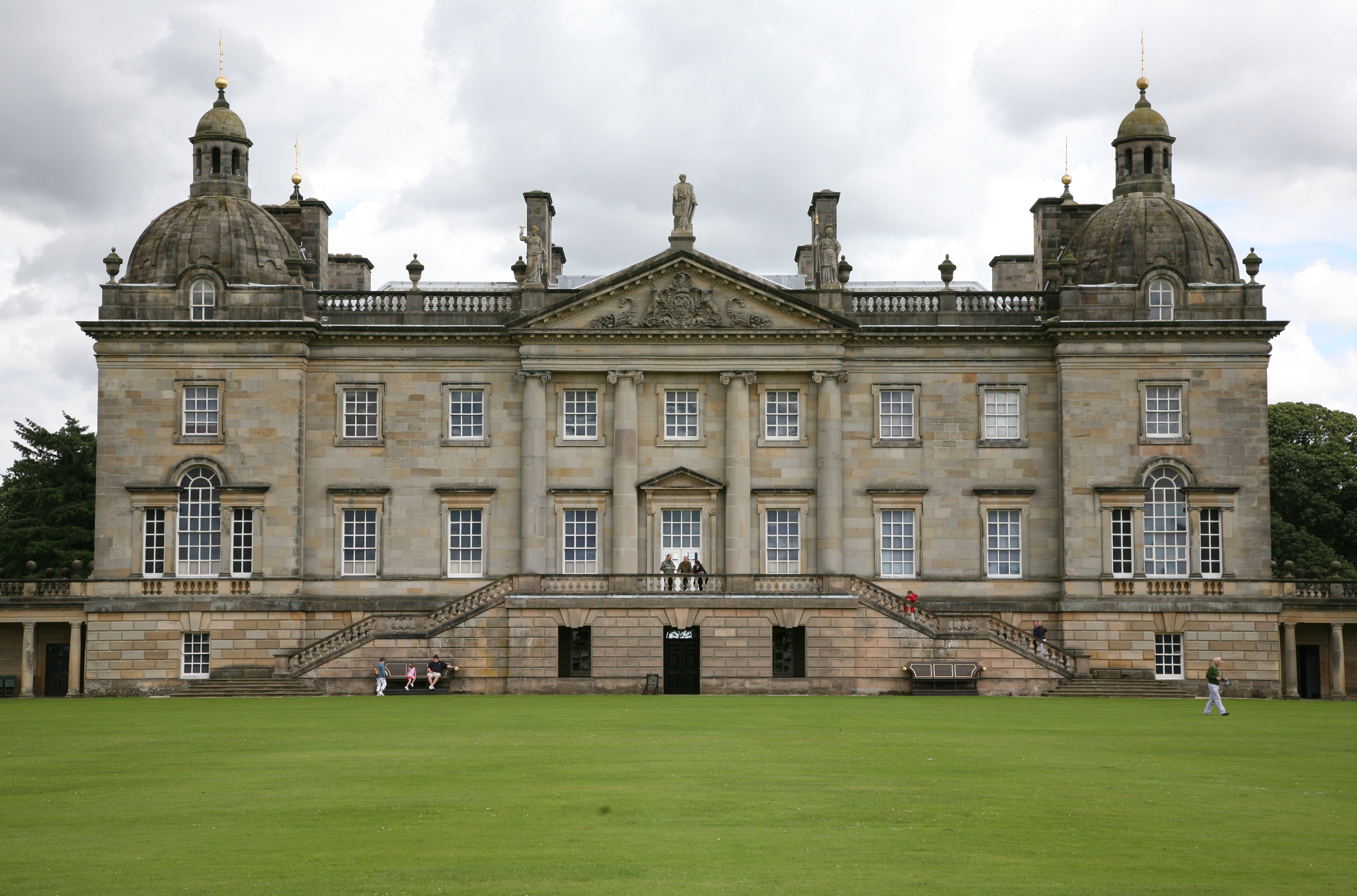
Houghton Hall, Norfolk

The family seats are Houghton Hall in Norfolk, and Cholmondeley Castle, which is surrounded by a 7,500-acre (3,000-hectare) estate near Malpas, Cheshire.

According to the Sunday Times Rich List in 2008, Cholmondeley has an estimated net worth of approximately £60m, attributed primarily to his inherited landholdings. Houghton Hall, ancestral home of the Marquesses of Cholmondeley since the establishment of the title in 1815, opens some of its rooms to the public, as well as the walled garden and extensive sculpture park.

The gardens of Cholmondeley Castle are also open to the public.

Cholmondeley was the co-author of the 2014 monograph on Houghton Hall published by Rizzoli.

In 2000 Cholmondeley commissioned Garlinda Birkbeck to photograph all the residents of his estates and the buildings within them in a survey that was bound in three volumes.

== Position at court ==
In 1974, at the age of fourteen, Cholmondeley, then known as the Earl of Rocksavage, was appointed as a Page of Honour to Queen Elizabeth II. He relinquished this role upon reaching the age limit in 1976.

One moiety of the ancient office of Lord Great Chamberlain is a Cholmondeley inheritance. This hereditary honour came into the Cholmondeley family through the marriage of the first Marquess of Cholmondeley to Lady Georgiana Charlotte Bertie, daughter of General Peregrine Bertie, 3rd Duke of Ancaster and Kesteven. The second, fourth, fifth, sixth and seventh holders of the marquessate have all held this office.

Cholmondeley exercised the office of Lord Great Chamberlain from 1990 to 2022, during the reign of Elizabeth II; in the event Charles III ceased to be king before Cholmondeley's death, he would either exercise the office again or nominate a deputy to act on his behalf. In March 2023, he was appointed a permanent lord-in-waiting.

== Marriage and children ==
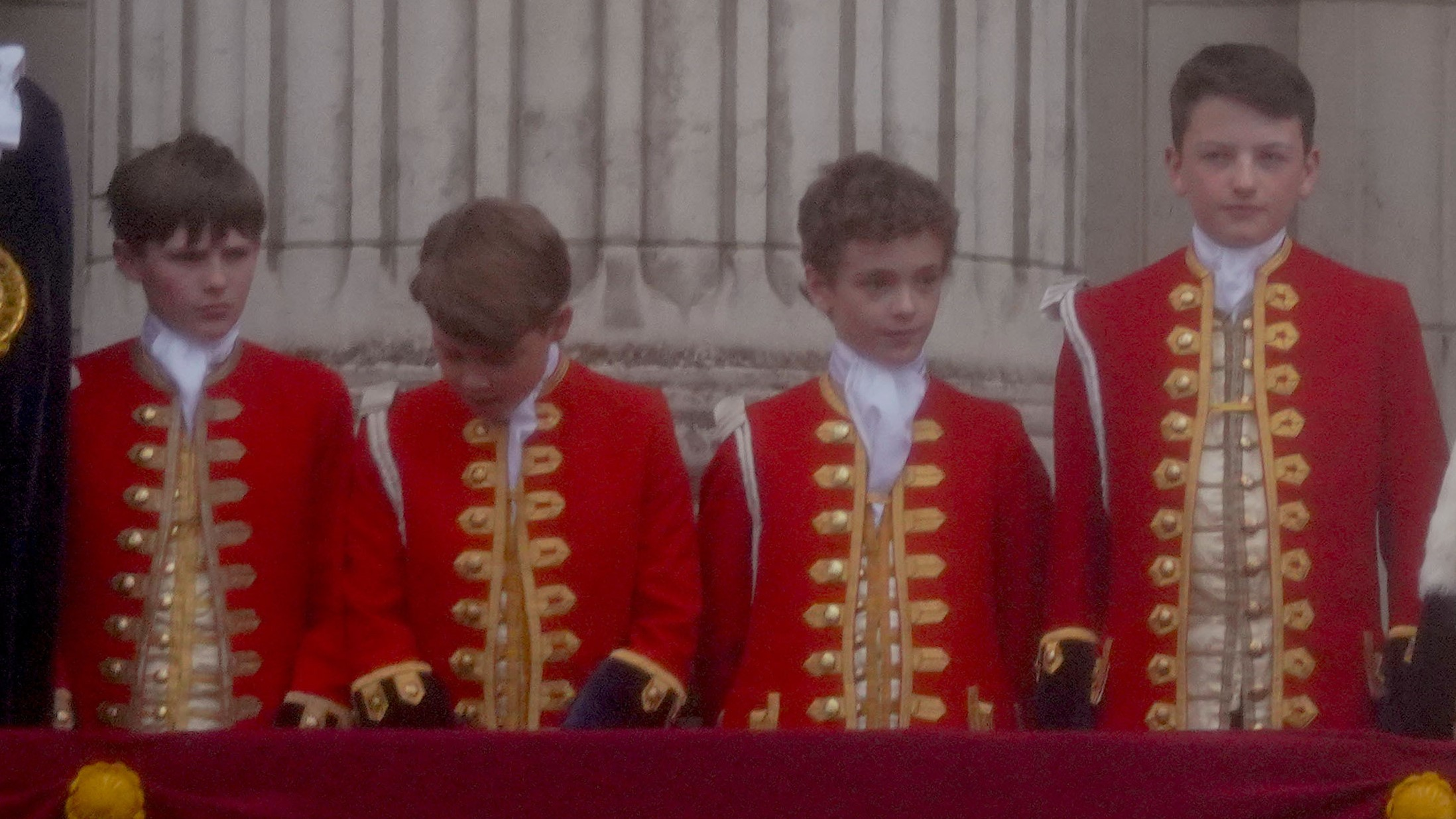
David's second son, Lord Oliver (third from left), in 2023

Lord Cholmondeley married Sarah Rose Hanbury, a fashion model, on 24 June 2009, their engagement having been announced two days prior. She is a daughter of Timothy Hanbury, a website designer, and Emma Hanbury (née Longman), a fashion designer. The landed gentry Hanbury family lived at Holfield Grange, Coggeshall, Essex.

Her maternal grandmother is Lady Elizabeth Lambart, daughter of Field Marshal Rudolph Lambart, 10th Earl of Cavan; Lady Elizabeth was one of the bridesmaids at the 1947 wedding of Princess Elizabeth; her paternal grandmother, Sara, was the daughter of racing driver Sir Tim Birkin, 3rd Baronet.

On 12 October 2009, the Marchioness gave birth to twin sons, Alexander Hugh George and Oliver Timothy George. The elder son, Alexander, as heir apparent to the Marquessate, bears the courtesy title of Earl of Rocksavage; his brother is known as Lord Oliver Cholmondeley.

In March 2016, the Marquess and Marchioness had their third child, a daughter, Lady Iris Marina Aline Cholmondeley.

Lord Oliver Cholmondeley was a page of honour at the coronation of King Charles III and Queen Camilla on 6 May 2023 at which the Marquess wore his Coronation robes. He subsequently served as a page of honour to the King.

== Titles, styles and arms ==
Lord Cholmondeley's coat of arms

- 27 June 1960 – 16 September 1968: Viscount Malpas
- 16 September 1968 – 13 March 1990: Earl of Rocksavage
- 13 March 1990 – present: The Most Honourable The Marquess of Cholmondeley

As the eldest son of the heir apparent of the 5th Marquess, he was known from birth by the courtesy title of Viscount Malpas. Upon his grandfather's death, he became the heir to the marquessate and was thus known by the courtesy title of Earl of Rocksavage, before inheriting the marquessate in 1990. He also inherited the following subsidiary titles:

- Earl of Cholmondeley (Peerage of England)
- Earl of Rocksavage (Peerage of the United Kingdom)
- Viscount Cholmondeley (Peerage of Ireland)
- Viscount Malpas (Peerage of England)
- Baron Cholmondeley (Peerage of England)
- Baron Newborough (Peerage of Ireland)
- Baron Newburgh (Peerage of Great Britain)

== Honours ==
- In the Queen's Birthday Honours List for 2007, Lord Cholmondeley was made a Knight Commander of the Royal Victorian Order (KCVO) for his 17 years of service as Lord Great Chamberlain.
- In the Honours List on the Demise of HM Queen Elizabeth II, Lord Cholmondeley was promoted to a Knight Grand Cross of the Royal Victorian Order (GCVO).
- He was awarded the UK Version of the Queen Elizabeth II Golden Jubilee Medal in 2002.
- He was awarded the UK Version of the Queen Elizabeth II Diamond Jubilee Medal in 2012.
- He serves as a Deputy Lieutenant of the County of Norfolk. This gives him the post-nominal letters "DL" for life.

== Notes ==
Court offices
Preceded by David Bland	Page of Honour; 1974–1976	Succeeded by Charles Loyd
Preceded by The 6th Marquess of Cholmondeley	Lord Great Chamberlain; 1990–2022	Succeeded by The 7th Baron Carrington
Peerage of the United Kingdom
Preceded by Hugh Cholmondeley	Marquess of Cholmondeley; 1990–present	Incumbent; Heir apparent: Alexander Cholmondeley, Earl of Rocksavage
Orders of precedence in the United Kingdom
Preceded by Charles Paget, 8th Marquess of Anglesey	Gentlemen	Succeeded by The 9th Marquess of Ailesbury
