= Rose Hanbury =

English model and peeress (born 1984)

The Most Honourable The Marchioness of Cholmondeley
- Born: Sarah Rose Hanbury; 15 March 1984 (age 42)
- Spouse: The 7th Marquess of Cholmondeley (m. 2009)
- Education: Stowe School
- Alma mater: Open University
- Occupations: Peeress; model; political staffer

Sarah Rose Cholmondeley, Marchioness of Cholmondeley (/ˈtʃʌmli/ CHUM-lee; née Hanbury; born 15 March 1984) is a British peeress, former model, and former political staffer. She is married to the 7th Marquess of Cholmondeley.

== Early life ==
Sarah Rose Hanbury is the daughter of Timothy Hanbury, a website designer, and Emma Hanbury (née Longman), a fashion designer. Her elder sister Marina is the third wife of the 7th Earl of Durham. The Hanbury family lived at Holfield Grange, Coggeshall, Essex. Her maternal grandmother was Lady Elizabeth Lambart (1924–2016), daughter of Field Marshal The 10th Earl of Cavan; Lady Elizabeth was one of the bridesmaids at the 1947 wedding of Princess Elizabeth and Lieutenant Philip Mountbatten; her paternal grandmother, Sara, was the daughter of racing driver Sir Henry Birkin, 3rd Baronet.

Hanbury was educated at Stowe School and earned a degree from the Open University.

== Career ==
Hanbury worked as a fashion model, signing with agency Storm at the age of 23, and was briefly a researcher for Conservative politician Michael Gove.

== Personal life ==
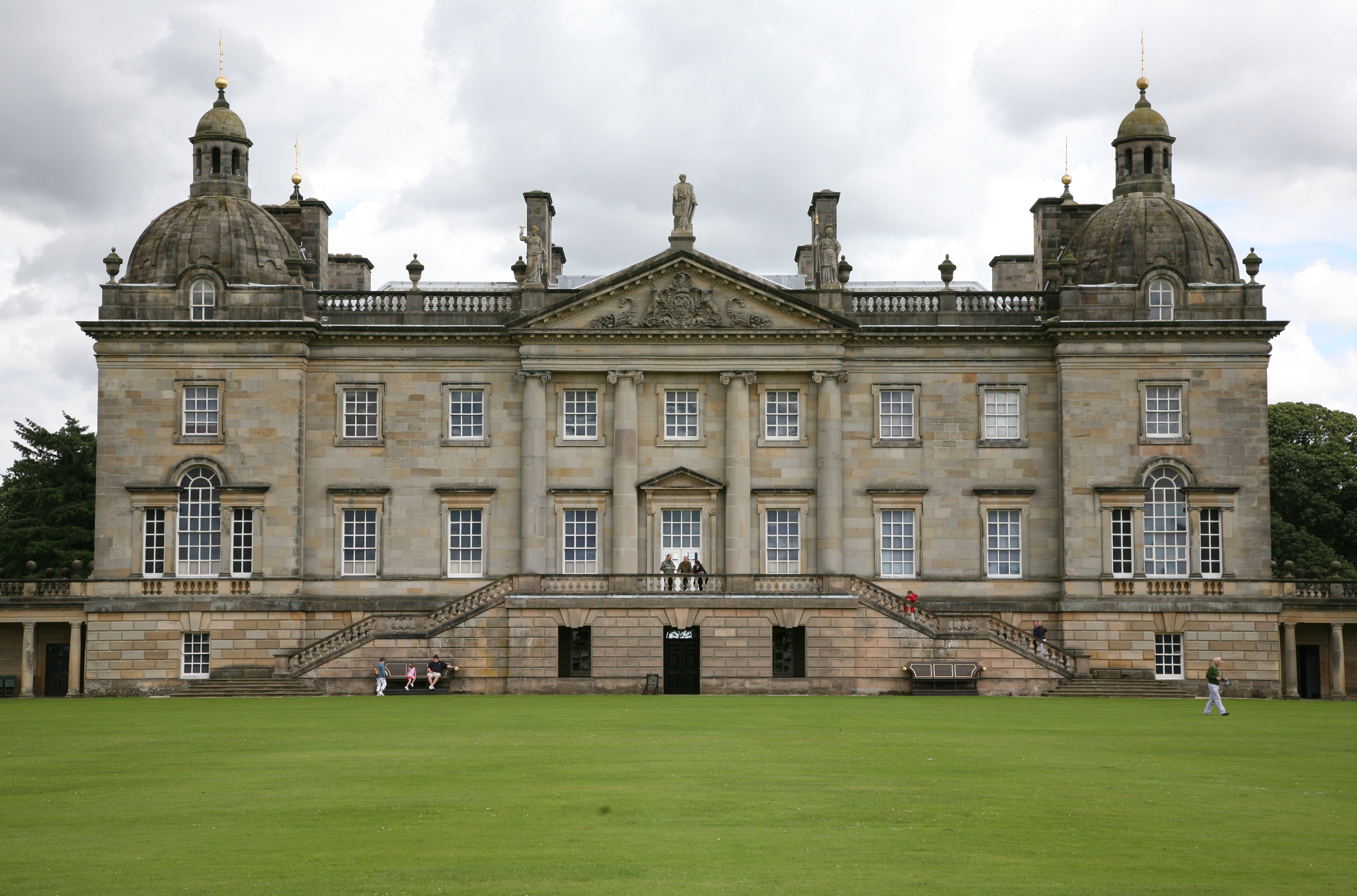
Houghton Hall

On 24 June 2009, Hanbury married the 7th Marquess of Cholmondeley at Chelsea Town Hall, their engagement having been announced two days earlier; the day before the wedding it was announced that she was expecting twins.

They have three children.

The family lives at Houghton Hall, Norfolk. The Marchioness is a patron of the charity East Anglia's Children's Hospices (EACH), along with the Princess of Wales.

Her son, Lord Oliver, was a page of honour at the coronation of King Charles III and Queen Camilla on 6 May 2023 which was also attended by both the Marchioness and her husband.

== Honours ==
- 6 May 2023: King Charles III Coronation Medal
