= Lord High Treasurer =

English government position

Lord High Treasurer of the United Kingdom
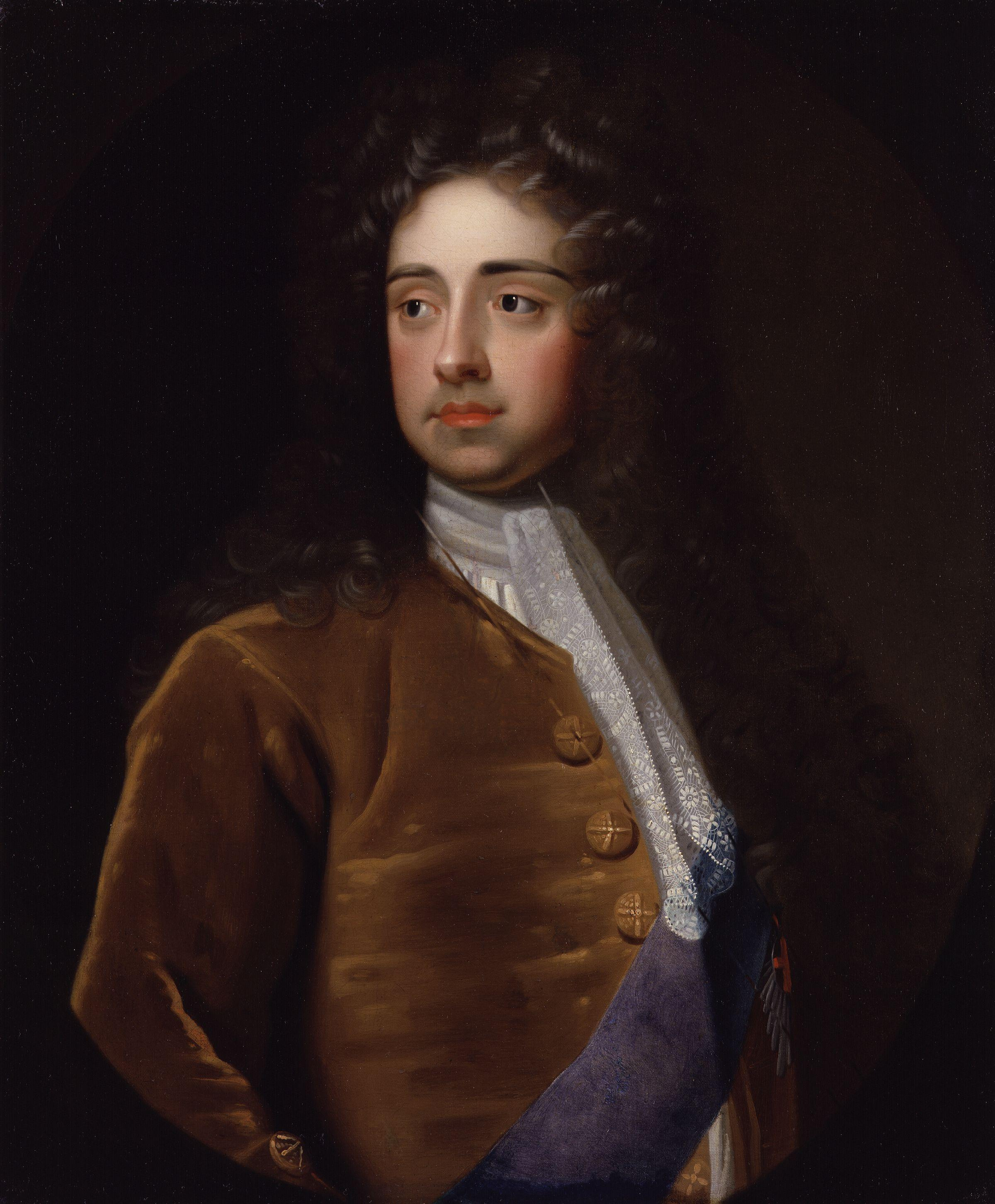
- Charles Talbot, 1st Duke of Shrewsbury, last holder of the office as Lord High Treasurer of Great Britain in 1714
- His Majesty's Treasury
- Type: Great Officer of State
- Appointer: The Monarch
- Term length: At His Majesty's Pleasure
- Precursor: Lord High Treasurer of Great Britain; Lord High Treasurer of Ireland
- Formation: 1817 (United Kingdom); 1714 (Great Britain); c. 1126 (England)
- First holder: Nigel of Ely as Lord High Treasurer of England
- Final holder: Charles Talbot, 1st Duke of Shrewsbury as Lord High Treasurer of Great Britain
- Superseded by: Prime Minister of the United Kingdom and First Lord of the Treasury; Chancellor and Under Treasurer of His Majesty's Exchequer and Second Lord of the Treasury; Lords Commissioners of His Majesty's Treasury

The lord high treasurer (also referred to as lord treasurer and as lord high treasurer and treasurer of the exchequer) was an English government position and subsequently a British government position since the Acts of Union of 1707 between England and Scotland. A holder of the post would have been the third-highest-ranked Great Officer of State in England, below the lord high steward and the lord high chancellor of Great Britain.

The lord high treasurer functioned as the head of His Majesty's Treasury. The office has, since the resignation of Charles Talbot, 1st Duke of Shrewsbury in 1714, been vacant.

Although the United Kingdom of Great Britain and Ireland was created in 1801, it was not until the Consolidated Fund Act 1816 that the separate offices of lord high treasurer of Great Britain and lord high treasurer of Ireland were united into one office as the "lord high treasurer of the United Kingdom of Great Britain and Ireland" on 5 January 1817.

Section 2 of the Consolidated Fund Act 1816 also provides that "whenever there shall not be [a Lord High Treasurer of the United Kingdom of Great Britain and Ireland], it shall ... be lawful for His Majesty, by letters patent under the Great Seal of Great Britain, to appoint Commissioners for executing the Offices of Treasurer of the Exchequer of Great Britain and Lord High Treasurer of Ireland". These are the lords commissioners of the Treasury. In modern times, appointments of the Lords Commissioners of the Treasury were, by convention, given as sinecure positions to the prime minister of the United Kingdom, usually serving as the first lord of the Treasury, and the chancellor of the exchequer, serving as the second lord of the Treasury. Other members of the government, usually whips in the House of Commons, are similarly appointed to serve as the junior lords commissioners of the Treasury.

== Origins ==
The English Treasury seems to have come into existence around 1126, during the reign of Henry I, as the financial responsibilities were separated from the rest of the job that evolved into Lord Great Chamberlain. The Treasury was originally a section of the Royal Household with custody of the King's money. In 1216, a Treasurer was appointed to take control of the Treasury in Winchester. The Treasurer was also an officer of the Exchequer, and supervised the royal accounts. In the 13th and early-14th century the same official was referred to interchangeably as the King's Treasurer and Treasurer of the Exchequer. It was in the 16th century, the office's title of King's Treasurer developed into Lord High Treasurer. By Tudor times, the Lord High Treasurer had achieved a place among the Great Officers of State, behind the Lord Chancellor and above the Master of the Horse. Under the Treason Act 1351 it is treason to kill him.

== Appointment ==
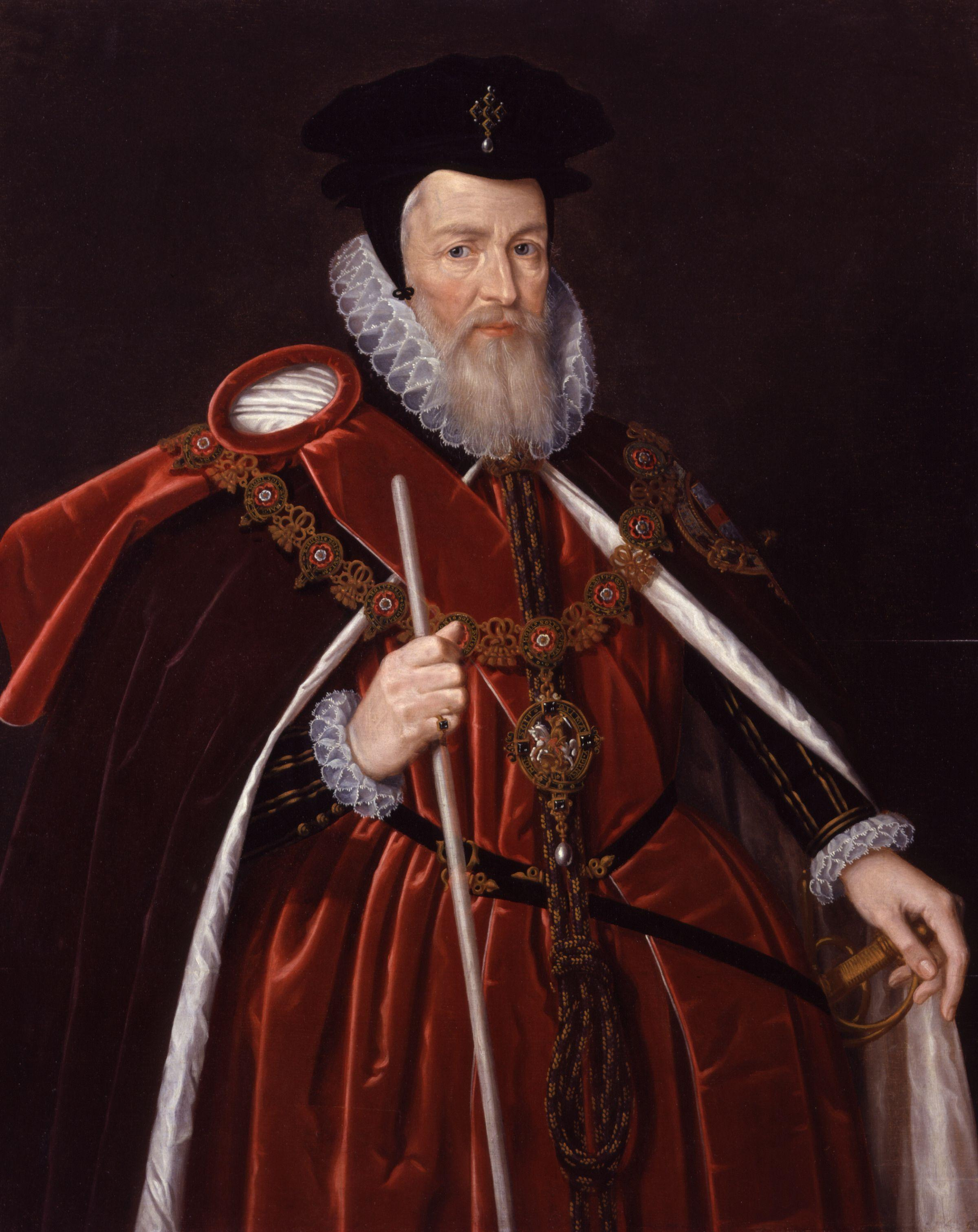
The Lord High Treasurer bears a white staff as his symbol of office. This is William Cecil, 1st Baron Burghley.

The office of Lord High Treasurer is distinct from that of Treasurer of the Exchequer, albeit when the Treasury was held by an individual, he was invariably appointed to both offices. The appointment of Lord High Treasurer was made by the delivery of a white staff to the appointee; whereas that of Treasurer of the Exchequer was made at His Majesty's pleasure by letters patent under the Great Seal of the Realm.

By the 18th century the appointment of a new Lord High Treasurer took place with elaborate ceremony within Westminster Hall and the Exchequer. The new Lord Treasurer, preceded by the clerks of the Treasury, the officers of the Exchequer, his secretary and his sergeant-at-mace, and attended by several Lords and Privy Counsellors, proceeded first to the Court of Chancery where he made his oaths to the Sovereign before the Lord Keeper of the Great Seal; then, accompanied by the Lord Keeper, he proceeded to the Court of Exchequer where the Lord Keeper, seated alongside the Barons of the Exchequer, made a speech explaining the two distinct offices to which the Lord Treasurer was appointed. The latter took the oaths of each respective office, after which his patent was delivered to him and he took his place alongside the Barons. The Lord Keeper having departed, the new Lord Treasurer sat for a time hearing motions in the Court; afterwards he went to take formal possession of each office (or department) of the Exchequer, and then to the Exchequer of Receipt (where a tally was ceremonially struck and the Auditor presented to him the great keys of the Treasury).

== Later history ==
During the sixteenth century, the Lord High Treasurer was often considered the most important official of the government, and became a de facto Prime Minister. Exemplifying the power of the Lord High Treasurer is William Cecil, 1st Baron Burghley, who served in the post from 1572 to 1598. During his tenure, he dominated the administration under Elizabeth I.

== The Treasury in Commission ==
The office was first put in commission on 16 June 1612. Technically, it is the office of Treasurer of the Exchequer that is put into commission, not the office of Lord High Treasurer; when the office of Treasurer of the Exchequer is put into commission, the office of Lord High Treasurer is left vacant. It has remained in commission since 1714.

== See also ==
- List of lord high treasurers of England and Great Britain
- List of lords commissioners of the Treasury
