= Hugh Cholmondeley, 6th Marquess of Cholmondeley =

British aristcrat

The Most Honourable The Marquess of Cholmondeley GCVO MC DL

Lord Great Chamberlain
- In office 1968–1990
- Monarch: Elizabeth II
- Preceded by: George Cholmondeley, 5th Marquess
- Succeeded by: David Cholmondeley, 7th Marquess

Personal details
- Born: George Hugh Cholmondeley; 24 April 1919 St George Hanover Square, London
- Died: 13 March 1990 (aged 70) Cholmondeley Castle, Cheshire
- Spouse: Lavinia Margaret Leslie
- Children: 4, including David
- Parent(s): George Cholmondeley, 5th Marquess of Cholmondeley; Sybil Sassoon
- Education: Magdalene College, Cambridge

Lord Cholmondeley's coat of arms

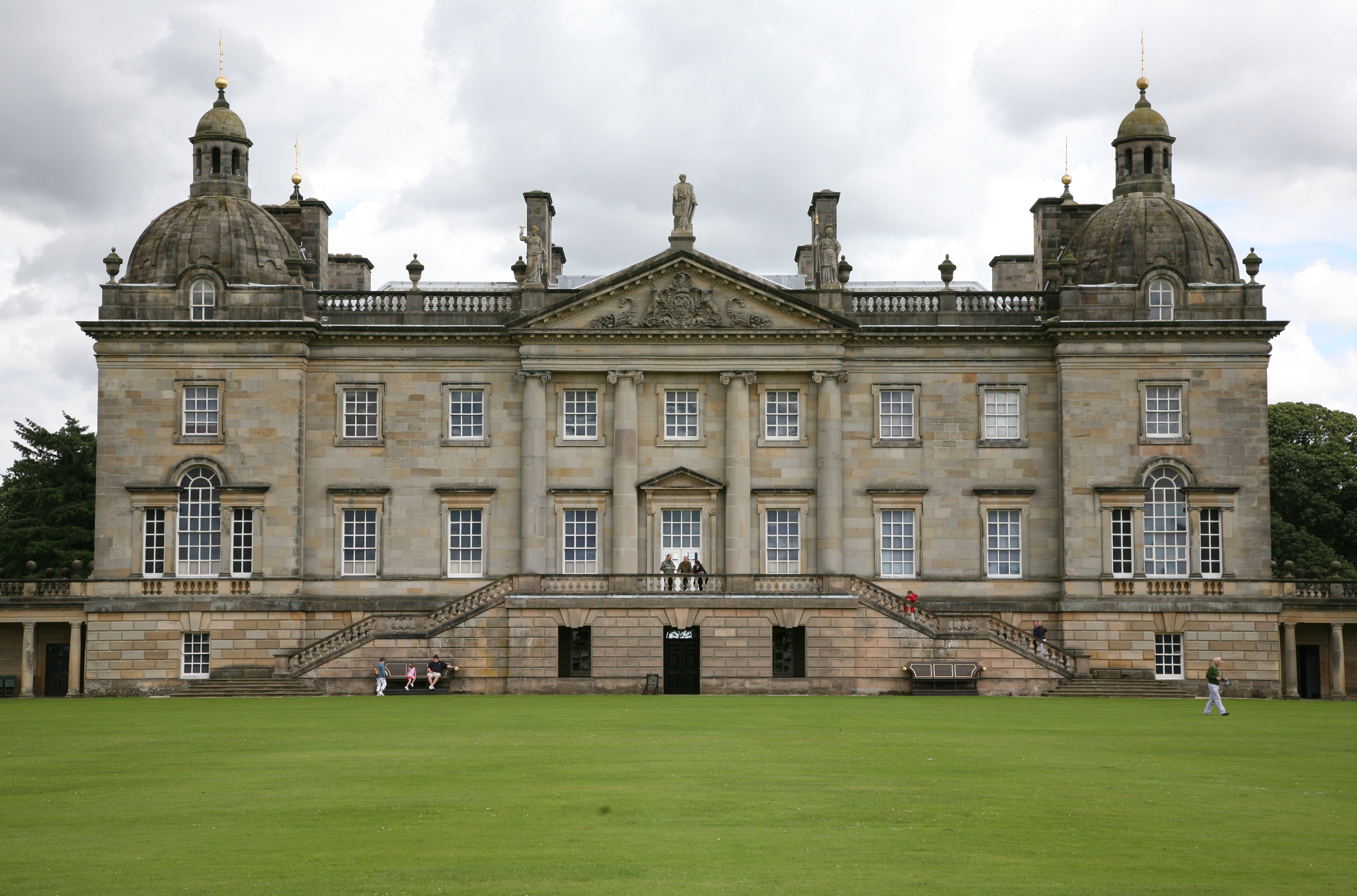
Houghton Hall in Norfolk, ancestral home of the Marquess of Cholmondeley since the establishment of the title in 1815, has now opened some of its rooms to the public.

George Hugh Cholmondeley, 6th Marquess of Cholmondeley GCVO, MC, DL (/ˈtʃʌmli/ CHUM-lee; 24 April 1919 – 13 March 1990), styled Earl of Rocksavage from 1923 until 1968, was a British peer who served as Lord Great Chamberlain of England between 1968 and 1990.

== Life and work ==
Cholmondeley was born in 1919 in St George Hanover Square, London, a descendant of Sir Robert Walpole, the first Prime Minister of Great Britain. He was the son of George Cholmondeley, 5th Marquess of Cholmondeley and Sybil Sassoon, of the Jewish Sassoon and Rothschild families. His mother was Jewish (from a family from Iraq, India, Germany, and France). Like his great-great-grandfather, his great-granduncle, his great-grandfather, his grandfather, his father and his son, Cholmondeley was educated at Eton. He studied at Magdalene College, University of Cambridge.

Cholmondeley served in the British army, initially in the Grenadier Guards and later in the 1st Royal Dragoons. During the Second World War, he saw action in the Middle East, in Italy, in France and in Germany. In 1943, he was decorated with the Military Cross (MC). When Cholmondeley retired from the military in 1949, he had attained the rank of Major.

Cholmondeley succeeded to his father's land, estates and title in 1968. He died at Cholmondeley Castle in Cheshire in 1990.

== Marriage and children ==
Cholmondeley married Lavinia Margaret Leslie (9 September 1921 – 7 November 2015), daughter of Colonel John Leslie, on 14 June 1947. The children of that marriage were:

- Lady Rose Aline Cholmondeley (born 20 March 1948); concert pianist, President of the Chopin Society UK, awarded the Medal for Merit to Culture – Gloria Artis by the Polish government
- Lady Margot Lavinia Cholmondeley (born 27 January 1950); married Walter Anthony Huston (divorced), has issue, including actor Jack Huston
- Lady Caroline Mary Cholmondeley (born 10 April 1952); married Rodolphe Frederic d'Erlanger (son of banker Leo Frédéric Alfred Baron d’Erlanger), has issue
- David George Philip Cholmondeley, 7th Marquess of Cholmondeley (born 27 June 1960)

Lavinia, Dowager Marchioness of Cholmondeley lived at Cholmondeley Castle.

== Lands and estates ==
The family seats are Houghton Hall, Norfolk, and Cholmondeley Castle, which is surrounded by a 7,500-acre (30 km^{2}) estate near Malpas, Cheshire.

== Position at court ==
One moiety part of the ancient office of Lord Great Chamberlain is a Cholmondeley inheritance. This hereditary honour came into the Cholmondeley family through the marriage of the first Marquess of Cholmondeley to Lady Georgiana Charlotte Bertie, daughter of Peregrine Bertie, 3rd Duke of Ancaster and Kesteven. The second, fourth, fifth, sixth and seventh holders of the marquessate have all held this office.

== Notes ==
Court offices
Preceded by The 5th Marquess of Cholmondeley	Lord Great Chamberlain; Acting; 1966–1968	Succeeded by Himself
Preceded by Himself as Deputy	Lord Great Chamberlain; 1968–1990	Succeeded by The 7th Marquess of Cholmondeley
Peerage of the United Kingdom
Preceded by George Cholmondeley	Marquess of Cholmondeley; 1968–1990	Succeeded by David Cholmondeley
