= George Cholmondeley, 5th Marquess of Cholmondeley =

British peer

The Most Honourable The Marquess of Cholmondeley GCVO
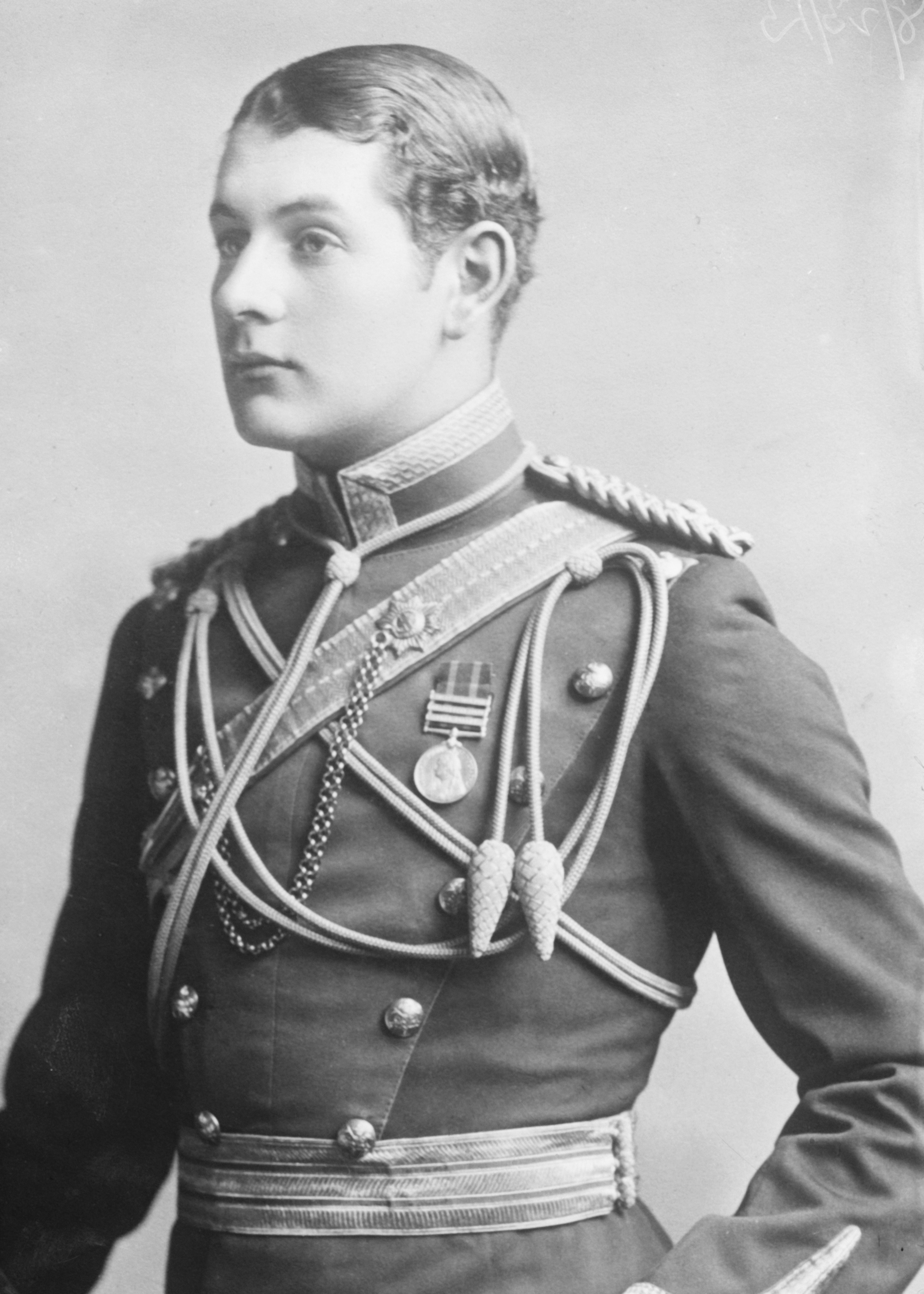
- Earl of Rocksavage, c. 1913

Lord Great Chamberlain of England
- In office 1952–1966
- Monarch: Elizabeth II
- Preceded by: James Heathcote-Drummond-Willoughby, 3rd Earl of Ancaster
- Succeeded by: Hugh Cholmondeley, Earl of Rocksavage (as deputy)
- In office 1936
- Monarch: Edward VIII
- Preceded by: William Legge, Viscount Lewisham (as deputy)
- Succeeded by: Gilbert Heathcote-Drummond-Willoughby, 2nd Earl of Ancaster

Personal details
- Born: George Horatio Charles Cholmondeley; 19 May 1883 Cholmondeley Castle, Malpas, Cheshire, England
- Died: 6 September 1968 (aged 85) London, England
- Spouse: Sybil Sassoon (m. 1913)
- Children: 3
- Parent(s): George Cholmondeley, 4th Marquess of Cholmondeley; Winifred Ida Kingscote

George Horatio Charles Cholmondeley, 5th Marquess of Cholmondeley GCVO (/ˈtʃʌmli/ CHUM-lee; 19 May 1883 – 16 September 1968), styled Earl of Rocksavage from birth until 1923, was a British peer. He was the Lord Great Chamberlain of England in 1936 and also between 1952 and 1966.

== Personal life ==
Cholmondeley was a direct descendant of Sir Robert Walpole, the first Prime Minister of Great Britain. He was born in Cholmondeley Castle, near Malpas, Cheshire, the son of George Cholmondeley, 4th Marquess of Cholmondeley and Winifred Ida Kingscote. In the years before he succeeded to his father's title, he was a well-known tennis and polo player.

He was also an authority on penmanship, championing a script which became known as the "Cholmondeley Italic", and was the first president of the Society for Italic Handwriting. In 1950, he established the Cholmondeley Prize, a handwriting contest between the students of Eton and Harrow. Winchester joined in 1952 and the schools have continued the annual competition since.

== Military career ==
Cholmondeley fought in the Second Boer War (1899–1901), serving as a "Railway Staff Officer", first with the Royal Sussex Regiment and from October 1901 as second lieutenant of the 9th Lancers. In 1905, he attained the rank of lieutenant in the 9th Lancers. He was aide-de-camp to the viceroy of India, and he fought in the First World War, during which he gained the rank of captain in the 9th Lancers.

In 1923 Cholmondeley succeeded to his father's estates and peerages, becoming known by the highest of those titles, Marquess of Cholmondeley. In the 1953 Coronation Honours he was made a Knight Grand Cross of the Royal Victorian Order.

== Lands and estates ==
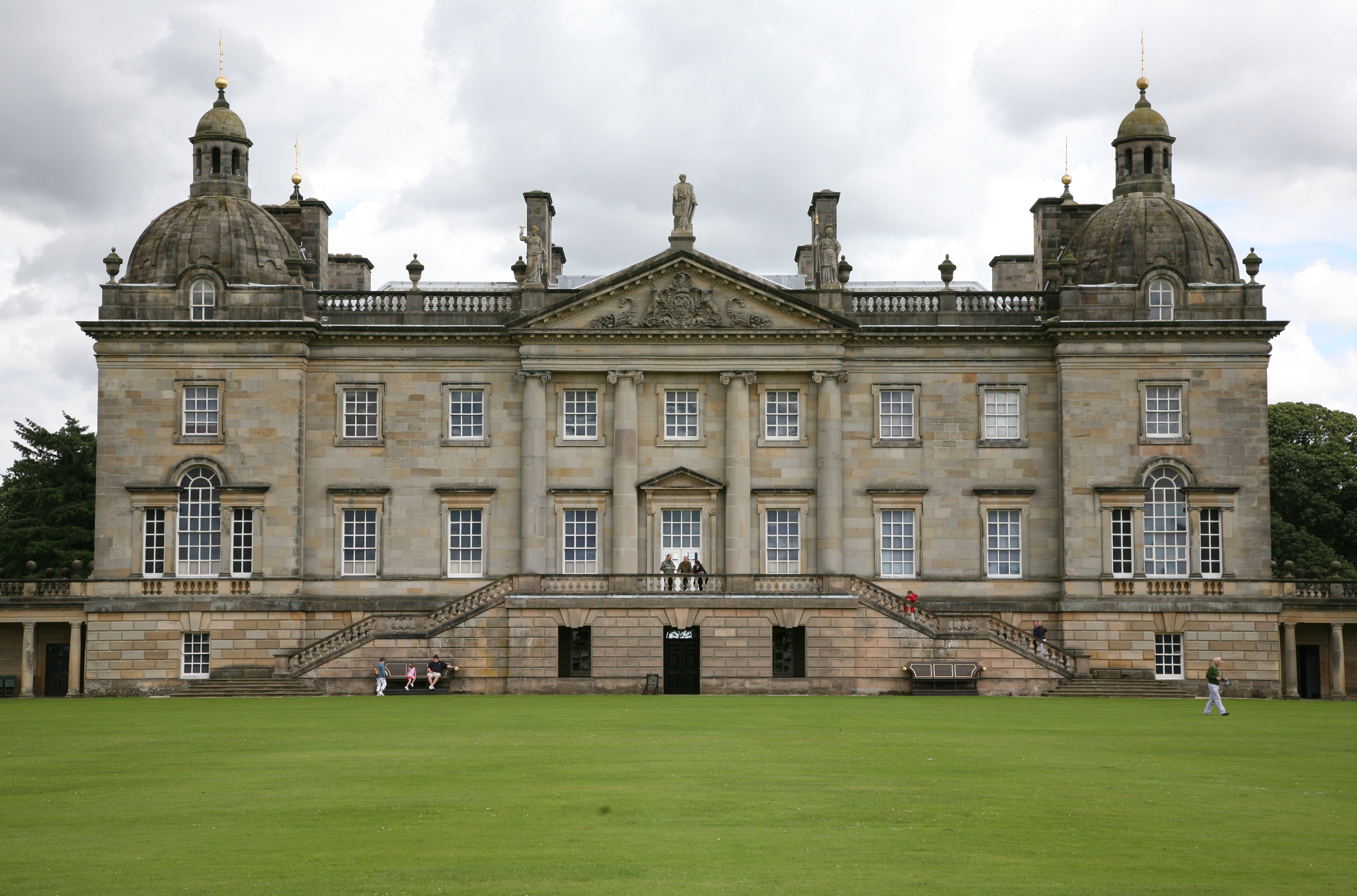
Houghton Hall, Norfolk, seat of the Marquesses of Cholmondeley since the title was created

The family seats are Houghton Hall, Norfolk, and Cholmondeley Castle, which is surrounded by a 7,500 acres (30 km^{2}) estate near Malpas, Cheshire.

The Cholmondeleys bought Wenbans near Wadhurst in Sussex in the mid-1890s. After major restoration work in the 1920s and 1930s, the rustic farm only 50 miles (80 km) from London was reported to have been used as a romantic getaway by the then Prince of Wales, who later became Edward VIII. The property was sold around the time of the abdication crisis of 1936 and the accession of George VI.

== Lord Great Chamberlain ==
The ancient office of Lord Great Chamberlain changes at the beginning of each monarch’s reign, as the right to it is divided between three families; one moiety of that right belongs to the Marquesses of Cholmondeley, having come to them as a result of the marriage of the first Marquess to Lady Georgiana Charlotte Bertie, daughter of Peregrine Bertie, 3rd Duke of Ancaster and Kesteven. The second, fourth, fifth, sixth and seventh holders of the marquessate have all held this office.

The 5th Marquess succeeded to the office in 1936, at the beginning of the reign of Edward VIII, which proved to be short. He bore the Royal Standard at the coronation of King George VI in 1937. He was again appointed at the beginning of the reign of Elizabeth II in 1952.

== Family ==
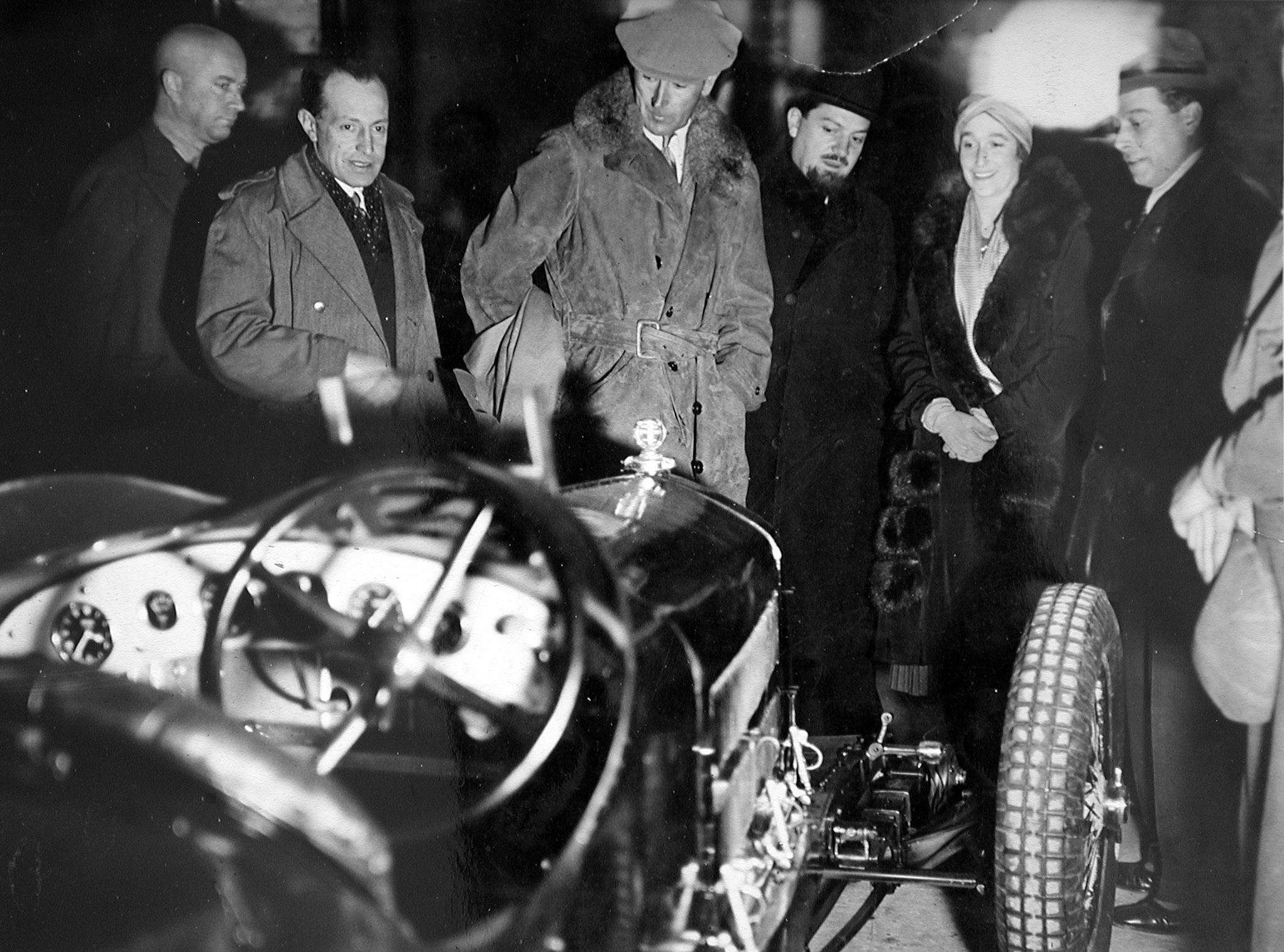
Visit to Alfa Romeo by the marquess (third from left), Italo Balbo (fourth), Lady Cholmondeley (fifth), Prospero Gianferrari (sixth), c. 1930

The wealth of the Cholmondeley family was greatly enhanced by Cholmondeley's marriage to Sybil Sassoon (1894–1989), a member of the Sassoon family and the Rothschild family, Jewish banking families, with origins in Baghdad, India, Germany, and France. She was heiress to her brother Sir Philip Sassoon. The couple were married on 6 August 1913, and they had two sons and one daughter:

- Lady Aline Caroline Cholmondeley (5 October 1916 – 30 June 2015)
- George Henry Hugh, 6th Marquess of Cholmondeley (24 April 1919 – 1990)
- Lord John George Cholmondeley (15 November 1920 – October 1986)

Cholmondeley died in 1968 and is buried in the Church of St Martin on the Houghton Hall estate.

His great-grandson is actor Jack Huston.

== See also ==
- Cholmondeley Award (poetry), established by the marchioness in 1966

Court offices
Preceded by Viscount Lewisham	Lord Great Chamberlain; 1936	Succeeded by The 2nd Earl of Ancaster
Preceded by The 3rd Earl of Ancaster	Lord Great Chamberlain; 1952–1966	Succeeded by Earl of Rocksavage
Peerage of the United Kingdom
Preceded by George Cholmondeley	Marquess of Cholmondeley; 1923–1968	Succeeded by George Cholmondeley
