= George Cholmondeley, 4th Marquess of Cholmondeley =

British peer

The Most Honourable The Marquess of Cholmondeley PC DL
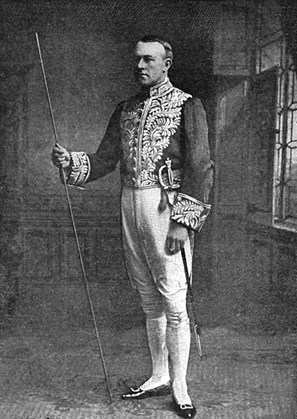

Lord Great Chamberlain of England
- In office 1901–1910
- Monarch: Edward VII
- Preceded by: The Earl of Ancaster
- Succeeded by: The Earl Carrington

Personal details
- Born: George Henry Hugh Cholmondeley; 3 July 1858 Kirtlington Park, Oxfordshire, England
- Died: 16 March 1923 (aged 64)
- Spouse: Winifred Ida Kingscote (m. 1879)
- Children: 3, including George
- Parent(s): George Cholmondeley; Susan Caroline Dashwood

George Henry Hugh Cholmondeley, 4th Marquess of Cholmondeley PC DL (/ˈtʃʌmli/ CHUM-lee; 3 July 1858 – 16 March 1923) was a British peer and a hereditary joint Lord Great Chamberlain of England. He exercised the office of Lord Great Chamberlain during the reign of King Edward VII (1901–1910).

== Biography ==
Cholmondeley was a direct descendant of Sir Robert Walpole, the first Prime Minister of Great Britain.

He was born at Kirtlington Park, Oxfordshire, the eldest son of George Cholmondeley, and Susan Caroline Dashwood.

As his father died prior to his grandfather, Cholmondeley succeeded to his grandfather's land, estates and title upon his death in 1884.

He was a Lieutenant in the service of the Cheshire Yeomanry. Later, he held the office of Deputy Lieutenant of Norfolk.

== Lands and estates ==
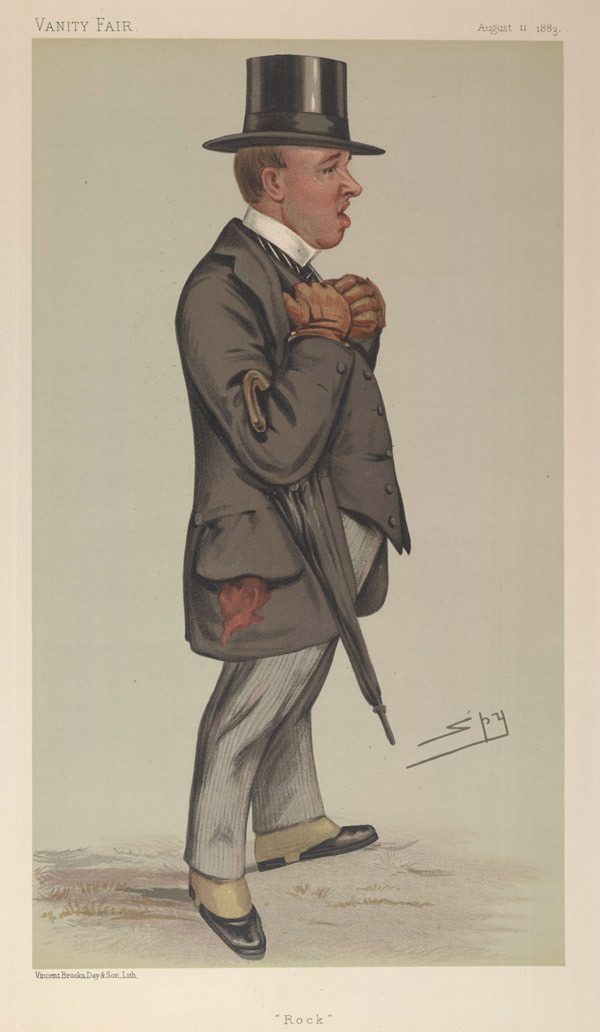
Caricature of Lord Cholmondeley by "Spy", Vanity Fair, 1883

He inherited approximately 34,000 acres (140 km^{2}) of land from his grandfather. The family seats are Houghton Hall, Norfolk, and Cholmondeley Castle, which is surrounded by a 7,500 acres (30 km^{2}) estate near Malpas, Cheshire.

The Cholmondeleys bought Wenbans near Wadhurst in Sussex in the mid-1890s. After major restoration work in the 1920s and 1930s, the rustic farm only 50 miles (80 km) from London was reported to have been used as a romantic getaway by the Prince of Wales (later Edward VIII).

== Position at court ==
One moiety part of the ancient office of Lord Great Chamberlain is a Cholmondeley inheritance. This hereditary honour came into the Cholmondeley family through the marriage of the first Marquess of Cholmondeley to Lady Georgiana Charlotte Bertie, daughter of Peregrine Bertie, 3rd Duke of Ancaster and Kesteven. The second, fourth, fifth, sixth and seventh holders of the marquessate have all held this office, which changes between the heirs of the two daughters of the Duke with each new reign.

The 4th Marquess of Cholmondeley was appointed to the office in September 1901, after the succession of King Edward VII earlier that year. He held the office until the King died and was succeeded by his son King George V in 1910. Cholmondeley was invested as a Privy Counsellor on 24 July 1901.

== Family ==
Cholmondeley married Winifred Ida Kingscote on 16 July 1879 at St George's, Hanover Square in Hanover Square, London. Cholmondeley's bride was the daughter of Colonel Sir Robert Nigel Fitzhardinge Kingscote and Lady Emily Marie Curzon, and the granddaughter of Richard Curzon-Howe, 1st Earl Howe.

The children of that marriage were:

- Lady Lettice Joan Cholmondeley (23 May 1882 – 2 November 1946)
- George Horatio Charles Cholmondeley, 5th Marquess of Cholmondeley (19 May 1883 – 16 September 1968)
- Lt Col Lord George Hugo Cholmondeley OBE MC (17 October 1887 – 26 August 1958)

== Death ==
On 20 February 1923, Cholmondeley was thrown from his horse while riding at Cholmondeley Castle. The horse tripped over a tree root and rolled over its rider. He had suffered a broken thigh and other injuries but seemed to be making progress. He died unexpectedly three weeks later at 64; his death was attributed to heart failure. It was his fourth serious accident in 15 years. In an obituary, The Times wrote that the marquess "was first and foremost a sportsman... despite his experience and mastery of horsemanship, he was a very unlucky rider."

His son, George Horatio, succeeded him as Marquess of Cholmondeley.

== Notes ==
Court offices
Preceded by The Earl of Ancaster	Lord Great Chamberlain; 1901–1910	Succeeded by The Earl Carrington
Peerage of the United Kingdom
Preceded by William Cholmondeley	Marquess of Cholmondeley; 1884–1923	Succeeded by George Cholmondeley
