= Cholmondeley (surname) =

Cholmondeley (/ˈtʃʌmli/ CHUM-lee) is a surname. Notable people with the surname include:

- Charles Cholmondeley (intelligence officer) (1917–1982), British intelligence officer
- David Cholmondeley, 7th Marquess of Cholmondeley (born 1960), British peer and Lord Great Chamberlain of England
- George Cholmondeley, 2nd Earl of Cholmondeley (1666–1733), English soldier
- George Cholmondeley, 3rd Earl of Cholmondeley (1703–1770), British peer and Whig politician
- George Cholmondeley, 1st Marquess of Cholmondeley (1749–1827), British peer and politician
- George Cholmondeley, 2nd Marquess of Cholmondeley (1792–1870), British peer and politician
- George Cholmondeley, 4th Marquess of Cholmondeley (1858–1923), British peer and Lord Chamberlain of England
- George Cholmondeley, 5th Marquess of Cholmondeley (1883–1968), British peer and Lord Great Chamberlain of England
- George Cholmondeley, Viscount Malpas (1724–1764), British soldier and MP
- Hugh Cholmondeley, 1st Earl of Cholmondeley (1662–1725)
- Hugh Cholmondeley, 6th Marquess of Cholmondeley (1919–1980), British peer and Lord Great Chamberlain of England
- Hugh Cholmondeley, 2nd Baron Delamere (1811–1887), British peer and politician
- Hugh Cholmondeley, 3rd Baron Delamere (1870–1931), British settler in Kenya
- Hugh Cholmondeley, 5th Baron Delamere (born 1934), British peer and Kenyan landowner
- Hugh Cholmondeley, 6th Baron Delamere, British peer and Kenyan
- Hugh Cholmondeley (soldier) (1513–1596), English soldier
- James Cholmondeley (1708–1775), British soldier and MP
- Lionel Berners Cholmondeley (1858–1945), British missionary in Japan and historian
- Mary Cholmondeley (1859–1925), English writer
  - Mary Cholmondeley (disambiguation), various
- Reginald Cholmondeley (1826–1896), English landowner, artist and collector
- Richard Cholmondeley (c.1460–1521), English farmer and soldier, Lieutenant of the Tower of London from 1513 to 1520
- Robert Cholmondeley, 1st Earl of Leinster (1584–1659), English Royalist
- Robert Cholmondeley, 1st Viscount Cholmondeley (died 1681), English peer
- Thomas Cholmondeley (disambiguation), various
- William Cholmondeley, 3rd Marquess of Cholmondeley (1800–1884), British peer and politician

== See also ==
- Cholmeley
- Cholmley
- Chumley (disambiguation)
