= Earl of Leinster =

Cholmondeley arms: Gules, in chief two esquire's helmets argent in base a garb or.

Earl of Leinster was a title in the Peerage of Ireland. It was created on 3 March 1646 for Robert Cholmondeley. He had already been created a baronet, of Cholmondeley in the County of Chester, in the Baronetage of England on 29 June 1611, and Viscount Cholmondeley in the Peerage of Ireland on 2 July 1628. He was created Baron Cholmondeley in the Peerage of England on 1 September 1648. Lord Leinster died childless in 1659 and the titles became extinct. However, the viscountcy of Cholmondeley was revived two years later in favour of his nephew Robert Cholmondeley (son of Hugh Cholmondeley), who is the ancestor of the Marquesses of Cholmondeley. Also, the Earl's other brother Thomas Cholmondeley was the ancestor of the Barons Delamere.

The family surname is pronounced "Chumley".

== Earls of Leinster (1646) ==
- Robert Cholmondeley, 1st Earl of Leinster (1584–1659)

== Earls of Leinster (1721) ==
- Sophia Charlotte von Kielmansegg, Countess of Leinster (1675–1725), life peerage.

== Family tree ==
Family trees of the Marquess of Cholmondeley, Earl of Leinster, and subsidiary titles

Hugh Cholmondeley; 1513–1596
Viscount Cholmondeley (1st creation), 1628; Earl of Leinster (1st creation), 1646; Baron Cholmondeley (1st creation), 1648
Hugh Cholmondeley d. 1655	Robert Cholmondeley; 1584–1659; Earl of Leinster, Viscount Cholmondeley, and Baron Cholmondeley	Thomas Cholmondeley; 1601–1652
Earldom of Leinster (1st creation, and subsidiary titles) extinct, 1659
Viscount Cholmondeley (2nd creation), 1661
Robert Cholmondeley d. 1681; 1st Viscount Cholmondeley	Thomas Cholmondeley; 1627–1702
Baron Cholmondeley, 1689; Earl of Cholmondeley and Viscount Malpas, 1706	Baron Newborough, 1715; Baron Newburgh, 1716	Earl of Leinster (2nd creation), 1721; Unrelated to the Cholmondeley family, but holding the Leinster title
Hugh Cholmondeley; 1662–1725; 1st Earl of Cholmondeley, Viscount Malpas, and Baron Cholmondeley; 2nd Viscount Cholmondeley	George Cholmondeley; 1666–1733; 2nd Earl of Cholmondeley, Viscount Malpas, and Baron Cholmondeley; 3rd Viscount Cholmondeley, 1st Baron Newborough and Baron Newburgh	Charles Cholmondeley; 1685–1759	Sophia von Kielmansegg; 1675–1725; Countess of Darlington and Countess of Leinster
Earldom of Leinster (2nd creation) extinct, 1725
George Cholmondeley; 1703–1770; 3rd Earl of Cholmondeley, Viscount Malpas, and Baron Cholmondeley; 4th Viscount Cholmondeley, 2nd Baron Newborough and Baron Newburgh
George Cholmondeley; 1724–1764 styled Viscount Malpas	Thomas Cholmondeley; 1726–1779
Marquess of Cholmondeley and Earl of Rocksavage, 1815	Baron Delamere, 1821
George James Cholmondeley; 1749–1827; 1st Marquess of Cholmondeley and Earl of Rocksavage; 4th Earl of Cholmondeley, Viscount Malpas, and Baron Cholmondeley; 5th Viscount Cholmondeley, 3rd Baron Newborough and Baron Newburgh	Thomas Cholmondeley; 1767–1855; 1st Baron Delamere
George Horatio; 1792–1870; 2nd Marquess of Cholmondeley and Earl of Rocksavage; 5th Earl of Cholmondeley, Viscount Malpas, and Baron Cholmondeley; 6th Viscount Cholmondeley, 4th Baron Newborough and Baron Newburgh	William Henry Hugh Cholmondeley; 1800–1884; 3rd Marquess of Cholmondeley and Earl of Rocksavage; 6th Earl of Cholmondeley, Viscount Malpas, and Baron Cholmondeley; 7th Viscount Cholmondeley, 5th Baron Newborough and Baron Newburgh	Hugh Cholmondeley; 1811–1887; 2nd Baron Delamere
Charles George Cholmondeley; 1829–1869
George Henry Hugh Cholmondeley; 1858–1923; 4th Marquess of Cholmondeley and Earl of Rocksavage; 7th Earl of Cholmondeley, Viscount Malpas, and Baron Cholmondeley; 8th Viscount Cholmondeley, 6th Baron Newborough and Baron Newburgh	Hugh Cholmondeley; 1870–1931; 3rd Baron Delamere
George Horatio Charles Cholmondeley; 1883–1968; 5th Marquess of Cholmondeley and Earl of Rocksavage; 8th Earl of Cholmondeley, Viscount Malpas, and Baron Cholmondeley; 9th Viscount Cholmondeley, 7th Baron Newborough and Baron Newburgh	Thomas Pitt Hamilton Cholmondeley; 1900–1979; 4th Baron Delamere
George Hugh Cholmondeley; 1919–1990; 6th Marquess of Cholmondeley and Earl of Rocksavage; 9th Earl of Cholmondeley, Viscount Malpas, and Baron Cholmondeley; 10th Viscount Cholmondeley, 8th Baron Newborough and Baron Newburgh	Hugh George Cholmondeley; 1934–2024; 5th Baron Delamere
David George Philip Cholmondeley, b. 1960; 7th Marquess of Cholmondeley and Earl of Rocksavage; 10th Earl of Cholmondeley, Viscount Malpas, and Baron Cholmondeley; 11th Viscount Cholmondeley, 9th Baron Newborough and Baron Newburgh	Thomas Patrick Gilbert Cholmondeley; 1968–2016
Alexander Hugh George Cholmondeley b. 2009 styled Earl of Rocksavage; Heir apparent to the Marquess of Cholmondeley	Hugh Cholmondeley b. 1998; 6th Baron Delamere	Henry Cholmondeley b. 2000; Heir presumptive to the Baron Delamere

== See also ==
- Marquess of Cholmondeley
- Baron Delamere

Baronetage of England
Preceded by Cotton baronets	Cholmondeley baronets 29 June 1611	Succeeded by Molyneux baronets
