= Hugh Cholmondeley =

Hugh Cholmondeley may refer to:

- Hugh Cholmondeley (soldier) (1513–1596), English soldier
- Hugh Cholmondeley (priest) (1770–1825), Dean of Chester Cathedral 1806–1815
- Hugh Cholmondeley, 1st Earl of Cholmondeley (1662–1725), British peer and politician
- Hugh Cholmondeley, 2nd Baron Delamere (1811–1887), British peer and politician
- Hugh Cholmondeley, 3rd Baron Delamere (1870–1931), British settler in Kenya
- Hugh Cholmondeley, 6th Marquess of Cholmondeley (1919–1990), British peer
- Hugh Cholmondeley, 5th Baron Delamere (1934–2024), British peer

== See also ==
- Hugh Cholmeley (disambiguation)
