= The Cholmondeley Ladies =

17th-century English portrait

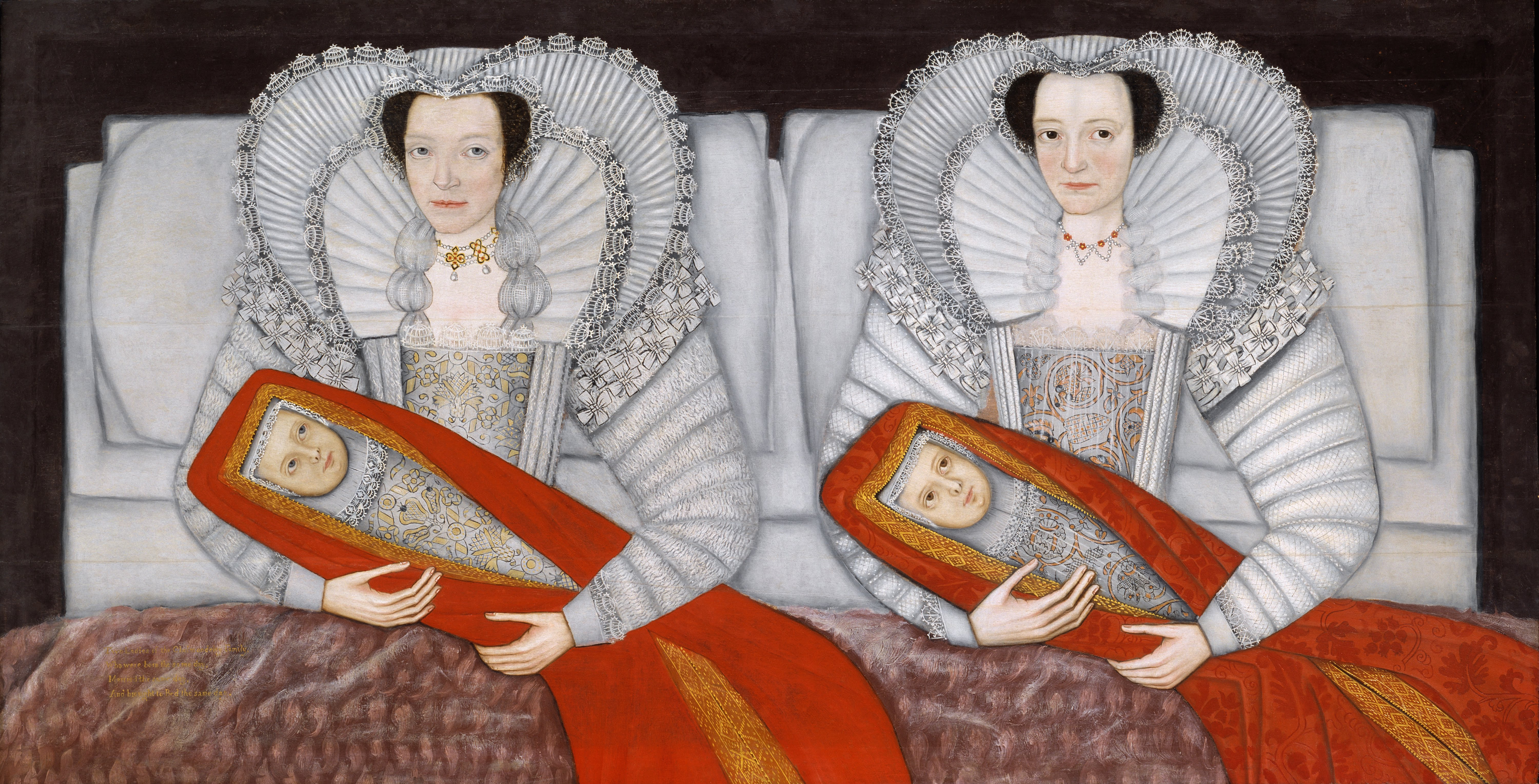
The Cholmondeley sisters and their swaddled babies. c.1600–1610

The Cholmondeley Ladies (pronounced /ˈtʃʌmli/ CHUM-lee) is an early-17th-century English oil painting depicting two women seated upright and side by side in bed, each holding a baby. Measuring 88.6 by 172.3 centimetres (34.9 in × 67.8 in), it was painted on four joined panels of oak, probably in the first decade of the 17th century. According to an inscription in gold lettering to the bottom left of the painting, it shows "Two Ladies of the Cholmondeley Family, Who were born the same day, Married the same day, And brought to Bed the same day."

At first sight, the two women and their two babies appear almost identical, each mother wearing similarly elaborate clothing decorated with lace and jewellery, each baby swaddled in a christening robe and held at a similar angle. On closer inspection, numerous details of the clothing, jewellery, and facial characteristics of the two pairs are seen to differ. The women could be sisters and possibly even twins but their differing eye colours demonstrate that they are not identical twins. The pose is not known to have been used in any other British painting, but was frequently seen in contemporary funerary art.

The artist is unknown, but the work is thought to have been painted near the Cholmondeley family's estates in Cheshire. It is painted on a predominantly white chalk ground, bound with animal glue size, and then primed with lead white and chalk bound with oil. Most of the painting was made using an additive technique, with areas of colours sketched out and then details and shading added in layers, but the faces were painted wet-in-wet. It was most recently cleaned and restored by the Tate in 1959, including restoration of areas of flaking paint. The painting was in the collection of Thomas Cholmondeley, the third son of Sir Hugh Cholmondeley and his wife Lady Mary Cholmondeley (née Holford), who was an ancestor of Baron Delamere. John T. Hopkins (1991) suggests that the portrait shows two daughters of Sir Hugh and Lady Mary Cholmondeley – Lettice, first wife of Sir Richard Grosvenor, 1st Baronet (and mother of Sir Richard Grosvenor, 2nd Baronet), and Mary Calveley (died 1616), wife of George Calveley.

It was presented to the Tate Gallery by an anonymous donor in 1955.
