= Marquess of Cholmondeley =

Title in the Peerage of the United Kingdom

Marquessate of Cholmondeley
- Arms: Gules in chief two Helmets in profile Argent, and in base a Garb Or. Crest: A Demi-Griffin segreant Sable, beaked winged and membered Or, holding between the claws a Helmet as in the arms. Supporters: Dexter: A Griffin Sable, beaked, winged and membered Or, langued Gules. Sinister: A Wolf Or, gorged with a Collar Vair, armed and langued Gules.
- Creation date: 22 November 1815
- Created by: The Prince Regent (acting on behalf of his father King George III)
- Peerage: Peerage of the United Kingdom
- First holder: George Cholmondeley, 4th Earl of Cholmondeley
- Present holder: David Cholmondeley, 7th Marquess of Cholmondeley
- Heir apparent: Alexander Cholmondeley, Earl of Rocksavage (born 2009)
- Remainder to: the first marquess's heirs male of the body lawfully begotten
- Subsidiary titles: Earl of Cholmondeley; Earl of Rocksavage; Viscount Cholmondeley (IRL); Viscount Malpas; Baron Cholmondeley; Baron Newborough (IRL); Baron Newburgh
- Status: Extant
- Seats: Houghton Hall; Cholmondeley Castle
- Motto: Cassis tutissima virtus (Virtue is the safest helmet)

Marquess of Cholmondeley (/ˈtʃʌmli/ CHUM-lee) is a title in the Peerage of the United Kingdom. It was created in 1815 for George Cholmondeley, 4th Earl of Cholmondeley.

== History ==
The Cholmondeley family descends from William le Belward (or de Belward), the feudal lord of the barony of Malpas in Cheshire who acquired the lordship of "Calmundelai" (as it was spelt in the Domesday Book) through his wife Beatrix, daughter of Hugh de Kevelioc, 5th Earl of Chester. Their eldest son David le Belward inherited the feudal barony of Malpas and was the ancestor of the Egerton family. The second son, Robert le Belward, became feudal lord of the barony of Cholmondeley, which he passed to his son Sir Hugh de Cholmondeley (or "Chelmundeleih"), who adopted the new surname.

His lineal descendant was Sir Hugh Cholmondeley (1513–1596), knighted by King Henry VIII. His eldest son was Robert Cholmondeley, 1st Earl of Leinster (Viscount Cholmondeley since 1628, Earl of Leinster after 1646) , while his youngest son Thomas was the ancestor of the Barons Delamere. Another son, his namesake Hugh, was the father of Robert Cholmondeley. He succeeded to the estates of his uncle Lord Leinster and was created Viscount Cholmondeley, of Kells in the County of Meath, in the Peerage of Ireland in 1661. He was succeeded by his eldest son, the second Viscount. He was a supporter of King William III and Queen Mary II and also served as Comptroller of the Household and as Treasurer of the Household. In 1689 he was created Baron Cholmondeley, of Nantwich in the County of Chester, in the Peerage of England, with remainder to his younger brother George Cholmondeley. In 1706 he was further honoured when he was made Viscount Malpas, in the County of Chester, and Earl of Cholmondeley, in the County of Chester, also in the Peerage of England and with the same special remainders.

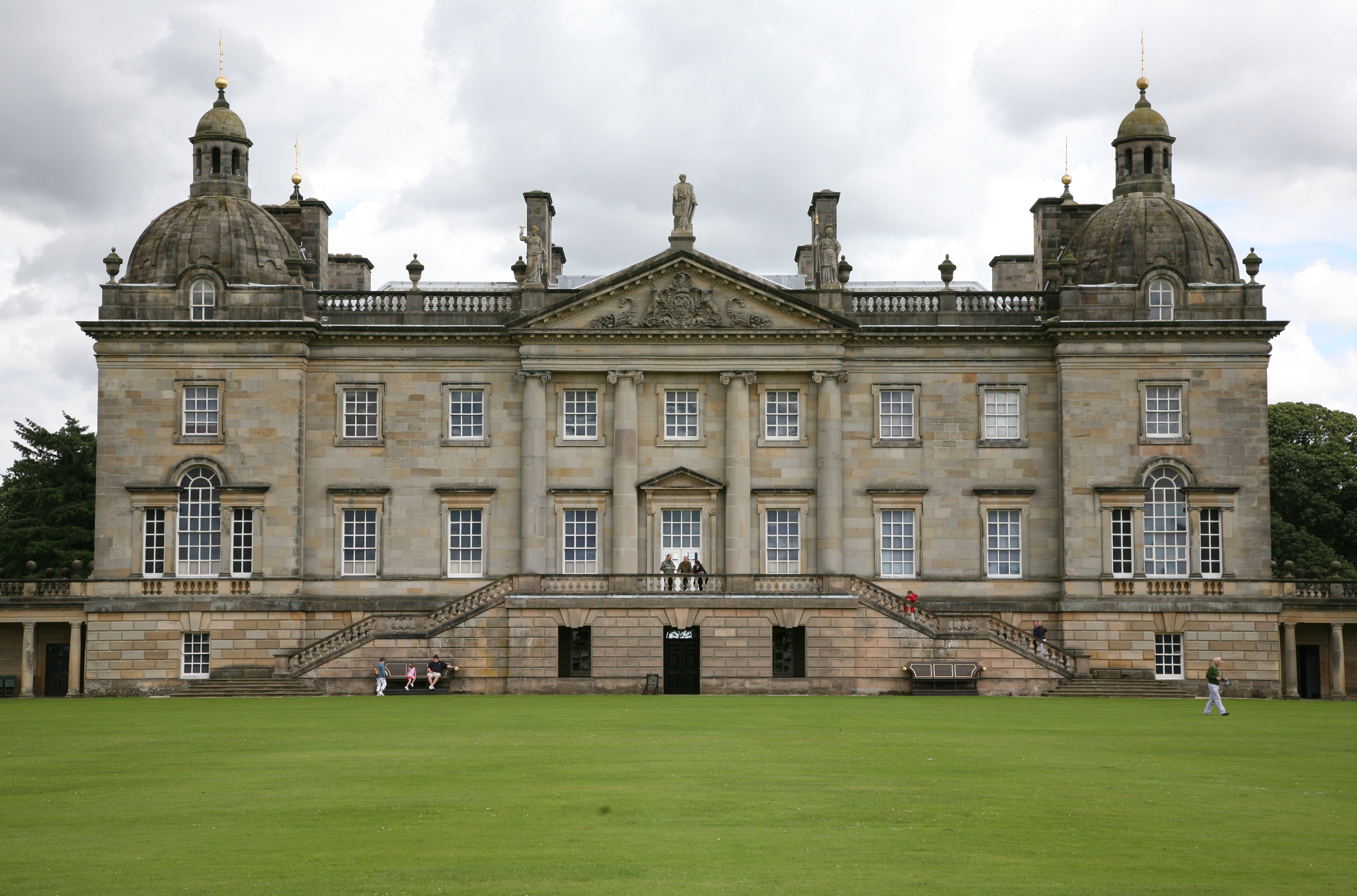
Houghton Hall, the ancestral home of the Marquess of Cholmondeley since the establishment of the title

Lord Cholmondeley never married and was succeeded according to the special remainders (and according to the normal descent in the viscountcy of Cholmondeley) by his younger brother George, the second Earl. He was a prominent military commander and commanded the Horse Guards at the Battle of the Boyne in 1690. In 1715, ten years before he succeeded his elder brother, he was raised to the Peerage of Ireland in his own right as Baron Newborough, of Newborough in the County of Wexford, and in 1716 he was made Baron Newburgh, in the Isle of Anglesey, in the Peerage of Great Britain. On his death the titles passed to his son, the third Earl. He was a politician and held office as Lord Privy Seal and Chancellor of the Duchy of Lancaster.

He was succeeded by his grandson, the fourth Earl. He was the son of George Cholmondeley, Viscount Malpas. Lord Cholmondeley was also a prominent politician and served as Captain of the Yeomen of the Guard and as Lord Steward of the Household. In 1815 he was created Earl of Rocksavage, in the County of Chester, and Marquess of Cholmondeley, in the Peerage of the United Kingdom. He was succeeded by his eldest son, the second Marquess. He represented Castle Rising in the House of Commons but in 1821 he was summoned to the House of Lords through a writ of acceleration in his father's junior title of Baron Newburgh. Lord Cholmondeley was childless and was succeeded by his younger brother, the third Marquess. He sat as Member of Parliament for Castle Rising and South Hampshire. As he outlived most of his children, including the elder son, the third Marquess was succeeded in his titles by his grandson. As of 2024, the titles are held by his great-great-great-grandson, the seventh Marquess, who succeeded his father in 1990.

The courtesy title of the Marquess's heir is Earl of Rocksavage, while Lord Rocksavage's eldest son is known as Viscount Malpas.

The family seats are Houghton Hall, Norfolk, and Cholmondeley Castle, which is surrounded by a 7,500-acre (3,000-hectare) estate near Malpas, Cheshire.

== Lord Great Chamberlain ==
A part of the office of Lord Great Chamberlain came into the Cholmondeley family through the marriage of the first Marquess of Cholmondeley to Lady Georgiana Charlotte Bertie, daughter of Peregrine Bertie, 3rd Duke of Ancaster and Kesteven. The second, fourth, fifth, sixth and seventh holders of the marquessate have all held this office. As Lord Great Chamberlain, the present Marquess was, during the reign of Elizabeth II, along with the Duke of Norfolk (the Earl Marshal), one of only two hereditary peers to retain automatic seats in the House of Lords after the passage of the House of Lords Act 1999.

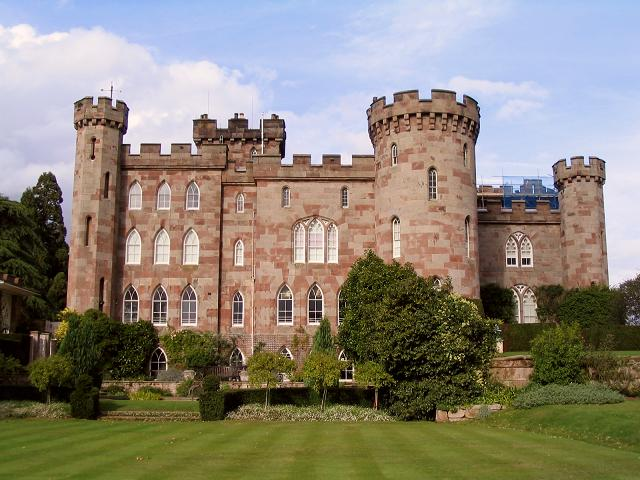
Cholmondeley Castle

== Cholmondeley Room ==
Peers in the House of Lords can hold their 70th birthday parties in the Cholmondeley Room at the Palace of Westminster. Among other uses, Baroness Elliot of Harwood organised a dinner in 1984 for all female Conservative members of Parliament and peers, and this event was held in this venue. The Cholmondeley Room and Terrace and the Attlee Room are available for private functions, sponsored by Members for personal use or for external organisations.

== Viscounts Cholmondeley (first creation, 1628) ==
- Robert Cholmondeley, 1st Viscount Cholmondeley (1584–1659) (after 1646 Earl of Leinster)

== Viscounts Cholmondeley (second creation, 1661) ==
- Robert Cholmondeley, 1st Viscount Cholmondeley (died 1681)
- Hugh Cholmondeley, 2nd Viscount Cholmondeley (1662–1725) (created Earl of Cholmondeley in 1706)

== Earls of Cholmondeley (1706), Viscount Malpas (1706), Baron Newborough (1715), Baron Newburgh (1716) ==
19th-century illustration of the Marquess' coat of arms

- Hugh Cholmondeley, 1st Earl of Cholmondeley (1662–1725)
- George Cholmondeley, 2nd Earl of Cholmondeley (1666–1733)
- George Cholmondeley, 3rd Earl of Cholmondeley (1703–1770)
  - George Cholmondeley, Viscount Malpas (1724–1764)
- George James Cholmondeley, 4th Earl of Cholmondeley (1749–1827) (created Marquess of Cholmondeley in 1815)

== Marquesses of Cholmondeley, Earl of Rocksavage (1815) ==
- George James Cholmondeley, 1st Marquess of Cholmondeley (1749–1827)
- George Horatio Cholmondeley, 2nd Marquess of Cholmondeley (1792–1870)
- William Henry Hugh Cholmondeley, 3rd Marquess of Cholmondeley (1800–1884)
  - Charles George Cholmondeley (1829–1869)
- George Henry Hugh Cholmondeley, 4th Marquess of Cholmondeley (1858–1923), grandson of Third Marquess and son of Charles George Cholmondely
- George Horatio Charles Cholmondeley, 5th Marquess of Cholmondeley (1883–1968)
- George Hugh Cholmondeley, 6th Marquess of Cholmondeley (1919–1990)
- David George Philip Cholmondeley, 7th Marquess of Cholmondeley (b. 1960)

The heir apparent is Alexander Hugh George Cholmondeley, Earl of Rocksavage, the elder of the present holder's twin sons (b. 2009). His younger twin brother is Lord Oliver Timothy George Cholmondeley.

== Family tree and line of succession ==
Family trees of the Marquess of Cholmondeley, Earl of Leinster, and subsidiary titles

Hugh Cholmondeley; 1513–1596
Viscount Cholmondeley (1st creation), 1628; Earl of Leinster (1st creation), 1646; Baron Cholmondeley (1st creation), 1648
Hugh Cholmondeley d. 1655 | Robert Cholmondeley; 1584–1659; Earl of Leinster, etc. | Thomas Cholmondeley; 1601–1652
Earldom of Leinster (1st creation, and subsidiary titles) extinct, 1659
Viscount Cholmondeley (2nd creation), 1661
Robert Cholmondeley d. 1681; 1st Viscount Cholmondeley | Thomas Cholmondeley; 1627–1702
Baron Cholmondeley, 1689; Earl of Cholmondeley and Viscount Malpas, 1706 | Baron Newborough, 1715; Baron Newburgh, 1716 | Earl of Leinster (2nd creation), 1721; Unrelated to the Cholmondeley family, but holding the Leinster title
Hugh Cholmondeley; 1662–1725; 1st Earl of Cholmondeley, etc., 2nd Viscount Cholmondeley | George Cholmondeley; 1666–1733; 2nd Earl of Cholmondeley, etc., 3rd Viscount Cholmondeley, 1st Baron Newborough and Baron Newburgh | Charles Cholmondeley; 1685–1759 | Sophia von Kielmansegg; 1675–1725; Countess of Darlington and Countess of Leinster
Earldom of Leinster (2nd creation) extinct, 1725
George Cholmondeley; 1703–1770; 3rd Earl of Cholmondeley, etc., 4th Viscount Cholmondeley, 2nd Baron Newborough and Baron Newburgh
George Cholmondeley; 1724–1764 styled Viscount Malpas | Thomas Cholmondeley; 1726–1779
Marquess of Cholmondeley and Earl of Rocksavage, 1815 | Baron Delamere, 1821
George James Cholmondeley; 1749–1827; 1st Marquess of Cholmondeley, etc., 4th Earl of Cholmondeley, etc., 5th Viscount Cholmondeley, 3rd Baron Newborough and Baron Newburgh | Thomas Cholmondeley; 1767–1855; 1st Baron Delamere
George Horatio; 1792–1870; 2nd Marquess of Cholmondeley, etc., 5th Earl of Cholmondeley, etc., 6th Viscount Cholmondeley, 4th Baron Newborough and Baron Newburgh | William Henry Hugh Cholmondeley; 1800–1884; 3rd Marquess of Cholmondeley, etc., 6th Earl of Cholmondeley, etc., 7th Viscount Cholmondeley, 5th Baron Newborough and Baron Newburgh | Hugh Cholmondeley; 1811–1887; 2nd Baron Delamere
Charles George Cholmondeley; 1829–1869
George Henry Hugh Cholmondeley; 1858–1923; 4th Marquess of Cholmondeley, etc., 7th Earl of Cholmondeley, etc., 8th Viscount Cholmondeley, 6th Baron Newborough and Baron Newburgh | Hugh Cholmondeley; 1870–1931; 3rd Baron Delamere
George Horatio Charles Cholmondeley; 1883–1968; 5th Marquess of Cholmondeley, etc., 8th Earl of Cholmondeley, etc., 9th Viscount Cholmondeley, 7th Baron Newborough and Baron Newburgh | Thomas Pitt Hamilton Cholmondeley; 1900–1979; 4th Baron Delamere
George Hugh Cholmondeley; 1919–1990; 6th Marquess of Cholmondeley, etc., 9th Earl of Cholmondeley, etc., 10th Viscount Cholmondeley, 8th Baron Newborough and Baron Newburgh | Hugh George Cholmondeley; 1934–2024; 5th Baron Delamere
David George Philip Cholmondeley, b. 1960; 7th Marquess of Cholmondeley, etc., 10th Earl of Cholmondeley, etc., 11th Viscount Cholmondeley, 9th Baron Newborough and Baron Newburgh | Thomas Patrick Gilbert Cholmondeley; 1968–2016
Alexander Hugh George Cholmondeley b. 2009 styled Earl of Rocksavage; Heir apparent to the Marquessate of Cholmondeley | Hugh Cholmondeley b. 1998; 6th Baron Delamere | Henry Cholmondeley b. 2000; Heir presumptive to the Barony Delamere

Line of succession
- George Cholmondeley, 5th Marquess of Cholmondeley (1883–1968)
  - Hugh Cholmondeley, 6th Marquess of Cholmondeley (1919–1990)
    - David Cholmondeley, 7th Marquess of Cholmondeley (born 1960)
      - (1). Alexander Hugh George Cholmondeley, Earl of Rocksavage (b. 2009)
      - (2). Lord Oliver Timothy George Cholmondeley (b. 2009)
  - Lord John George Cholmondeley (1920–1986)
    - (3). Charles George Cholmondeley (b. 1959)

== See also ==
- Earl of Leinster
- Baron Delamere
