= Thomas Cholmondeley =

Thomas Cholmondeley may refer to:

- Thomas Cholmondeley (1627–1702), Member of Parliament (MP) for Cheshire 1670–1679 and 1685–1689
- Thomas Cholmondeley (1726–1779), MP for Cheshire 1756–1768
- Thomas Cholmondeley, 1st Baron Delamere (1767–1855)
- Thomas Cholmondeley, 4th Baron Delamere (1900–1979)
- Thomas Cholmondeley (farmer) (1968–2016), Kenyan farmer, son and heir of the 5th Baron Delamere, convicted of manslaughter (7 May 2009)
