= Lionel Berners Cholmondeley =

British missionary in Japan and historian

Lionel Berners Cholmondeley (11 December 1858 – 21 January 1945) was an ordained Anglican priest, educator, historian and Rector of St. Barnabas' Church at Ushigome in Shinjuku, Tokyo. For thirty years he served as a minister in the Anglican Church in Japan, and variously as a lecturer at Waseda University and honorary chaplain to the British Embassy in Tokyo. As a historian he published the first English-language history of the Bonin Islands, now known as the Ogasawara Islands.

== Early life ==
Lionel Cholmondeley was descended from a younger brother of Robert Cholmondeley, 1st Earl of Leinster and Hugh Cholmondeley, father of Robert Cholmondeley, 1st Viscount Cholmondeley, from whom the Marquesses of Cholmondeley descend.

His grandfather was Thomas Cholmondeley, 1st Baron Delamere. The baron's third son was Revd. Henry Pitt Cholmondeley (15 June 1820 – 14 April 1905), Rector of Broadwells with Adelstrop, who in 1848 married Mary Leigh, fifth daughter of the poet Chandos Leigh, 1st Baron Leigh. This marriage produced nine children; Lionel being the couple's second son, born in Adlestrop in Gloucestershire.

Cholmondeley attended Uppingham School and graduated with a BA in 1882 (subsequently raised to an MA in 1885) from Oriel College, Oxford.

== Career ==
After graduation from Oxford and following in the footsteps of both his father and elder brother Francis, Lionel Cholmondeley followed a path to ordination in Church of England.

Cholmondely became a Christian missionary in Japan (1887–1921), arriving in Tokyo under the auspices of the Society for the Propagation of the Gospel in Foreign Parts (SPG) to serve under Edward Bickersteth, the first Anglican Bishop of South Tokyo.

In July 1902, Cholmondeley succeeded Archdeacon Alexander Croft Shaw as honorary chaplain to the British Embassy, Tokyo, a position he held until his retirement and return to England in 1922.

=== Bonin Islands ===
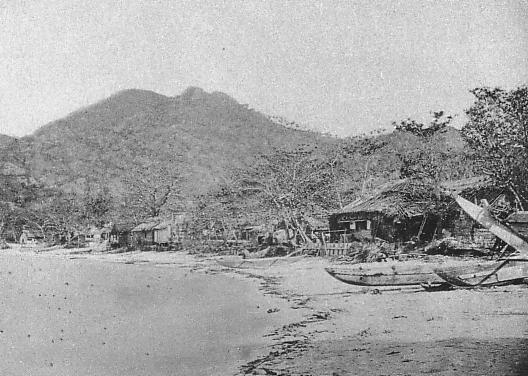
Chichi-jima in the Meiji period during the time frame in which Cholmondeley would have made trips to the island.

Bishop Bickersteth was asked to send a clergyman to visit the English-speaking settlers on the Ogasawara Islands; and in response, he asked Cholmondely to sail to the islands in 1894. This initial trip was followed by sixteen others during the remainder of Cholmondeley's time in Japan.

Among other changes he observed during these years was the completion of undersea cable connections which ensured telegraph communication between the islands and Japan after 1906.

In 1915, Cholmondeley published The History of the Bonin Islands from the Year 1827 to the Year 1876 which included detailed observations of the changes which evolved after annexation by Meiji Japan in 1875.

==== Chronology ====
- 1894—1st visit. Cholmondeley joins Anglican catechist Ishida-san, who had come by previous steamer. This Japanese colleague returned with Cholmondeley to Tokyo.
- 1896—2nd visit. Cholmondeley joins Cameron Johnson, who was staying there at the time. The School-house built this year by settlers.
- 1897—3rd visit.

== Selected works ==
- 1915 – The History of the Bonin Islands from the Year 1827 to the Year 1876. London: Constable & Co. OCLC 4717954
- 1929 – A book of devotions, compiled from many sources and the growth of many years. London. OCLC 315960899
