= Baron Delamere =

Title in the Peerage of the United Kingdom

- Blazon: Arms: Gules two Esquire's Helmets in chief proper in base a Garb Or.; Crests: A Demi Griffin segreant Sable beaked and membered ducally gorged and Wings elevated Or holding between the claws a Helmet as in the Arms.; Supporters: On either side a Griffin Sable beaked membered and Wings elevated ducally gorged and chained Or.
- Creation date: 17 July 1821
- Created by: George IV
- Peerage: United Kingdom
- First holder: Thomas Cholmondeley, 1st Baron Delamere
- Present holder: Hugh Cholmondeley, 6th Baron Delamere
- Heir apparent: None
- Heir presumptive: Henry Cholmondeley
- Status: Extant
- Seat: Sugoni Farm
- Former seat: Vale Royal Great House
- Motto: CASSIS TUTISSIMA VIRTUE (Virtue is the safest helmet)

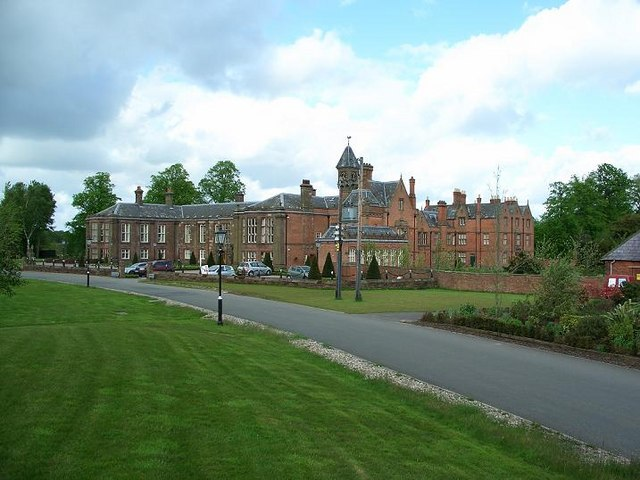
Vale Royal Great House, the former seat of the Barons Delamere.

Baron Delamere, of Vale Royal in the County Palatine of Chester, is a title in the Peerage of the United Kingdom. It was created on 17 July 1821 for Thomas Cholmondeley, a former Member of Parliament for Cheshire. This Vale Royal branch of the Cholmondeley family descends from Thomas Cholmondeley (died 1653), younger brother of Robert Cholmondeley, 1st Earl of Leinster, and Hugh Cholmondeley (1591–1665), ancestor of the Marquesses of Cholmondeley. The first Baron was succeeded by his son. Before acceding to the title in 1855, the second Baron represented Denbighshire and Montgomery in the House of Commons as a Tory.

His eldest son, also named Hugh, acceded to the title in 1887, and in the same year, he immigrated to Kenya, where he acquired a major estate. The third Baron's eldest son inherited his father's title in 1931. In 1934, he attempted to re-establish his family at Vale Royal, the family's country home and baronial seat from the 17th century; however, the great house was requisitioned as a sanatorium during the war years. When it was sold in 1947, the fourth Baron returned to Kenya. As of 2024 the title was held by the sixth Baron, who succeeded his grandfather in 2024.

The family surname is pronounced /ˈtʃʌmli/ CHUM-lee.

== Barons Delamere (1821) ==
- Thomas Cholmondeley, 1st Baron Delamere (1767–1855)
- Hugh Cholmondeley, 2nd Baron Delamere (1811–1887)
- Hugh Cholmondeley, 3rd Baron Delamere (1870–1931)
- Thomas Pitt Hamilton Cholmondeley, 4th Baron Delamere (1900–1979)
- Hugh George Cholmondeley, 5th Baron Delamere (1934–2024)
- Hugh Cholmondeley, 6th Baron Delamere (born 1998)

The heir presumptive is the present holder's brother, Henry Cholmondeley (born 2000)

== Family tree ==
Family trees of the Marquess of Cholmondeley, Earl of Leinster, and subsidiary titles

Hugh Cholmondeley; 1513–1596
Viscount Cholmondeley (1st creation), 1628; Earl of Leinster (1st creation), 1646; Baron Cholmondeley (1st creation), 1648
Hugh Cholmondeley d. 1655	Robert Cholmondeley; 1584–1659; Earl of Leinster, etc.	Thomas Cholmondeley; 1601–1652
Earldom of Leinster (1st creation, and subsidiary titles) extinct, 1659
Viscount Cholmondeley (2nd creation), 1661
Robert Cholmondeley d. 1681; 1st Viscount Cholmondeley	Thomas Cholmondeley; 1627–1702
Baron Cholmondeley, 1689; Earl of Cholmondeley and Viscount Malpas, 1706	Baron Newborough, 1715; Baron Newburgh, 1716	Earl of Leinster (2nd creation), 1721; Unrelated to the Cholmondeley family, but holding the Leinster title
Hugh Cholmondeley; 1662–1725; 1st Earl of Cholmondeley, etc., 2nd Viscount Cholmondeley	George Cholmondeley; 1666–1733; 2nd Earl of Cholmondeley, etc., 3rd Viscount Cholmondeley, 1st Baron Newborough and Baron Newburgh	Charles Cholmondeley; 1685–1759	Sophia von Kielmansegg; 1675–1725; Countess of Darlington and Countess of Leinster
Earldom of Leinster (2nd creation) extinct, 1725
George Cholmondeley; 1703–1770; 3rd Earl of Cholmondeley, etc., 4th Viscount Cholmondeley, 2nd Baron Newborough and Baron Newburgh
George Cholmondeley; 1724–1764 styled Viscount Malpas	Thomas Cholmondeley; 1726–1779
Marquess of Cholmondeley and Earl of Rocksavage, 1815	Baron Delamere, 1821
George James Cholmondeley; 1749–1827; 1st Marquess of Cholmondeley, etc., 4th Earl of Cholmondeley, etc., 5th Viscount Cholmondeley, 3rd Baron Newborough and Baron Newburgh	Thomas Cholmondeley; 1767–1855; 1st Baron Delamere
George Horatio; 1792–1870; 2nd Marquess of Cholmondeley, etc., 5th Earl of Cholmondeley, etc., 6th Viscount Cholmondeley, 4th Baron Newborough and Baron Newburgh	William Henry Hugh Cholmondeley; 1800–1884; 3rd Marquess of Cholmondeley, etc., 6th Earl of Cholmondeley, etc., 7th Viscount Cholmondeley, 5th Baron Newborough and Baron Newburgh	Hugh Cholmondeley; 1811–1887; 2nd Baron Delamere
Charles George Cholmondeley; 1829–1869
George Henry Hugh Cholmondeley; 1858–1923; 4th Marquess of Cholmondeley, etc., 7th Earl of Cholmondeley, etc., 8th Viscount Cholmondeley, 6th Baron Newborough and Baron Newburgh	Hugh Cholmondeley; 1870–1931; 3rd Baron Delamere
George Horatio Charles Cholmondeley; 1883–1968; 5th Marquess of Cholmondeley, etc., 8th Earl of Cholmondeley, etc., 9th Viscount Cholmondeley, 7th Baron Newborough and Baron Newburgh	Thomas Pitt Hamilton Cholmondeley; 1900–1979; 4th Baron Delamere
George Hugh Cholmondeley; 1919–1990; 6th Marquess of Cholmondeley, etc., 9th Earl of Cholmondeley, etc., 10th Viscount Cholmondeley, 8th Baron Newborough and Baron Newburgh	Hugh George Cholmondeley; 1934–2024; 5th Baron Delamere
David George Philip Cholmondeley, b. 1960; 7th Marquess of Cholmondeley, etc., 10th Earl of Cholmondeley, etc., 11th Viscount Cholmondeley, 9th Baron Newborough and Baron Newburgh	Thomas Patrick Gilbert Cholmondeley; 1968–2016
Alexander Hugh George Cholmondeley b. 2009 styled Earl of Rocksavage; Heir apparent to the Marquessate of Cholmondeley	Hugh Cholmondeley b. 1998; 6th Baron Delamere	Henry Cholmondeley b. 2000; Heir presumptive to the Barony Delamere

== See also ==
- Earl of Leinster
- Marquess of Cholmondeley
- Baron Delamer
