= Hugh Cholmondeley (priest) =

Dean of Chester Cathedral 1806–1815

Very Rev. Hugh Cholmondeley FSA (18 December 1772 – 25 November 1815) was an English Anglican priest from the Cholmondeley family. He was Dean of Chester from 1806 until his death.

Cholmondeley was born at Vale Royal Abbey, Cheshire, the fourth son of Thomas Cholmondeley and Dorothy Cowper, daughter and heiress of Edmund Cowper of Overleigh Hall. He was the younger brother of the Thomas Cholmondeley, 1st Baron Delamere.

He was educated at Brasenose College, Oxford. He died in 1815 at the Deanery in Chester.
