= Custos Rotulorum of Cheshire =

This is a list of people who have served as Custos Rotulorum of Cheshire.

- Richard Sampson, Bishop of Coventry and Lichfield bef. 1544–1547
- Sir Thomas Holcroft 1548–1558
- Sir Richard Harpur 1558–1563
- Sir William Gerard bef. 1564 – bef. 1573
- Sir Edward Fitton bef. 1573–1579
- Sir Hugh Cholmondeley (the elder) 1579–1597
- Sir Hugh Cholmondeley (the younger) 1597–1601
- Sir John Egerton 1601–1614
- Sir George Booth, 1st Baronet 1621–1644
- Sir Orlando Bridgeman, 1st Baronet 1644–1646?
- Interregnum
- George Booth, 1st Baron Delamer 1660–1673
- Henry Booth, 2nd Baron Delamer 1673–1682
- William Stanley, 9th Earl of Derby 1682–1688
- William Herbert, 1st Marquess of Powis 1688–1689
- Henry Booth, 1st Earl of Warrington 1689–1694

For later Custodes Rotulorum, see Lord Lieutenant of Cheshire.
