= Thomas Cholmondeley, 1st Baron Delamere =

British politician

The Right Honourable The Lord Delamere
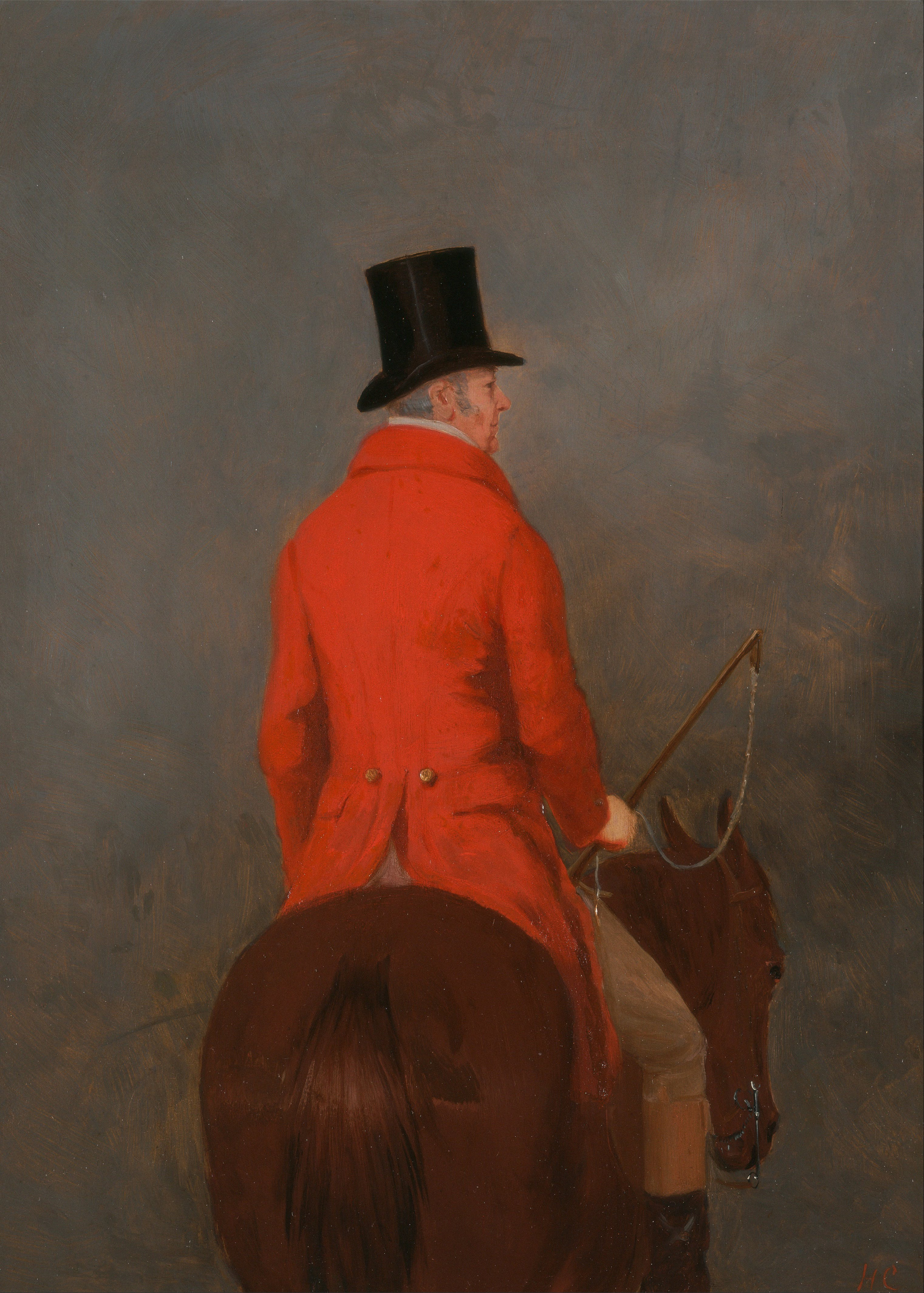
- Portrait of Thomas Cholmondeley, first Lord Delamere, on His Hunter (study for "The Cheshire Hunt at Tatton Park"), c. 1839, Henry Calvert
- Born: Thomas Cholmondeley; 9 August 1767; Beckenham, Kent
- Died: 30 October 1855 (aged 88); London
- Education: Pembroke College, Cambridge
- Occupation: Politician
- Spouse: Henrietta Elizabeth Williams-Wynn (m. 1810; died 1852)
- Children: Hugh Cholmondeley, 2nd Baron Delamere; Thomas Grenville Cholmondeley; Henry Pitt Cholmondeley; Henrietta Charlotte Cholmondeley; Charles Watkin Neville Cholmondeley
- Parents: Thomas Cholmondeley; Dorothy Cowper

Thomas Cholmondeley, 1st Baron Delamere (/ˈtʃʌmli/ CHUM-lee; 9 August 1767 – 30 October 1855), of Vale Royal, Cheshire, was a British landowner and politician. He was elected MP for Cheshire in 1796 (with John Crewe), a seat he held until 1812.

== Background ==
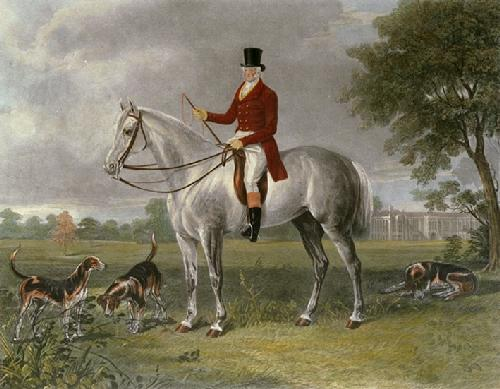
"Lord Delamere," etching by Henry Calvert (1798–1869). Thomas Cholmondeley astride a dappled grey hunter.

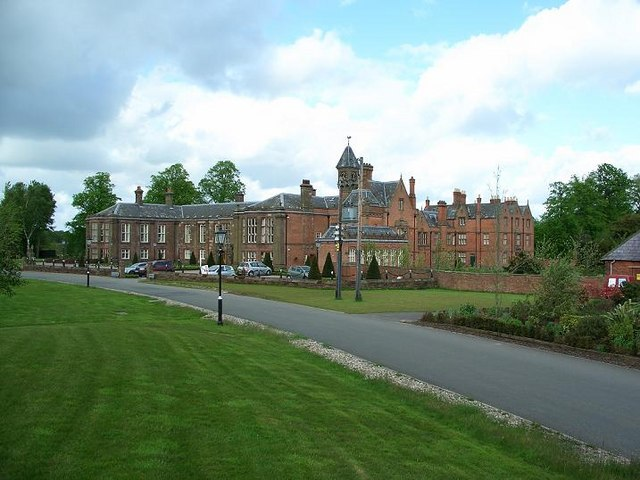
Vale Royal Great House, formerly the seat of the Barons of Delamere – sold in 1947

He was born on 9 August 1767 in Beckenham, Kent, the eldest son of Thomas Cholmondeley (1726–1779), Vale Royal, Cheshire and Dorothy Cowper. On his father's side he descended from a younger brother of Robert Cholmondeley, 1st Earl of Leinster, and Hugh Cholmondeley, father of Robert Cholmondeley, 1st Viscount Cholmondeley, from whom the Marquesses of Cholmondeley descend. Delamere was an indirect descendant of Sir Robert Walpole, the first Prime Minister of Great Britain.

The Cholmondeleys were long established at their seat at Vale Royal Abbey, Cheshire which had been in the family since 1615.

Cholmondeley was admitted to the Middle Temple in 1781 and entered Pembroke College, Oxford in 1785.

== Career ==
He served as High Sheriff of Cheshire in 1792 and then in 1796 was elected to the House of Commons for his father's old seat of Cheshire, which he retained until 1812. On 17 July 1821 he was raised to the peerage as Baron Delamere, of Vale Royal in the County Palatine of Chester. Hugh Cholmondeley, 5th Baron Delamere paints a picture of his early-19th-century ancestor with deft, harsh strokes:

"[The 1st Baron Delamere] was an idiot who decided it would be impressive to have a peerage. He thought he had a bargain when he paid 5,000 for it. The only problem was that the going rate was 1,200. Before he came along we had been content to be shire knights in Cheshire, when William the Conqueror gave us the whole county."

== Family ==
On 17 December 1810, Cholmondeley married Henrietta Elizabeth Williams-Wynn (d. 1852), daughter of Sir Watkin Williams-Wynn, 4th Baronet, and his wife, Charlotte (née Grenville). That union produced five children and numerous grandchildren:

- Hugh (3 October 1811 – 1 August 1887) married Sarah Hay-Drummund, and later married Augusta Emily Seymour.
- Thomas Grenville (4 August 1818 – 9 February 1883) married Katherine Lucy Sykes, and later married Violet Maud Parker
- Henry Pitt (15 June 1820 – 14 April 1905) married Mary Leigh

- Francis Grenville (1850–1937).
- Lionel Berners (1858–1945).
- Edward Chandos (1860–1957).
- Henry Reginald (1862–1947).
- Charles Fiennes (1863–1959).
- Alice Margarette (18__–1937).
- Mary Louisa (18__–1947).
- Rose Evelyn (18__ –1907).
- Eleanor Caroline (18__–1947).

- Henrietta Charlotte (3 June 1823 – 13 August 1874), who married Henry Wilson, 11th Baron Berners.
- Charles Watkin Neville (27 May 1826 – 18 March 1844).—unmarried

The marriage of the baron's third son, Henry, produced nine grandchildren; and of these, Lionel would become chaplain to the British Embassy in Tokyo and would write the first English-language history of the isolated Bonin Islands, including notes of changes which evolved after annexation by Meiji Japan in 1875.

Cholmondeley died in London on 30 October 1855 at the age of 88. He was succeeded in the land, estates and title by his eldest son Hugh Cholmondeley.

== See also ==
- Lionel Berners Cholmondeley

== Notes ==
Parliament of Great Britain
Preceded by John Crew; Sir Robert Salusbury Cotton	Member of Parliament for Cheshire; 1796–1801; With: John Crew	Succeeded by Parliament of the United Kingdom
Parliament of the United Kingdom
Preceded by Parliament of Great Britain	Member of Parliament for Cheshire; 1801–1812; With: John Crew 1801–1802; William Egerton 1802–1806; Davies Davenport 1806–1812	Succeeded by Davies Davenport; Wilbraham Egerton
Peerage of the United Kingdom
New creation	Baron Delamere; 1821–1855	Succeeded by Hugh Cholmondeley
