= Mary Cholmondeley (disambiguation) =

Mary Cholmondeley (1859–1925) was an English novelist.

Mary Cholmondeley may refer to:

- Mary Cholmondeley, Lady Delamere (1906–1986), English heiress and socialite
- Mary Cholmondeley (heiress) (1562–1625), English heiress
- Mary Woffington Cholmondeley (1729–1811), Irish-born actress and socialite
