= Henry Cholmondeley =

English cricketer and solicitor

Personal information
- Full name: Henry Pitt Cholmondeley
- Born: 15 June 1820; Whitegate, Cheshire, England
- Died: 14 April 1905 (aged 84); Broadwell, Gloucestershire, England
- Batting: Unknown

Domestic team information
- Years: Team
- 1844: Marylebone Cricket Club

Career statistics
| Competition | First-class |
|---|---|
| Matches | 1 |
| Runs scored | 8 |
| Batting average | 4.00 |
| 100s/50s | –/– |
| Top score | 4 |
| Catches/stumpings | –/– |
- Source: Cricinfo, 11 September 2021

Henry Pitt Cholmondeley (15 June 1820 – 14 April 1905) was an English first-class cricketer and clergyman.

The son of the Thomas Cholmondeley, 1st Baron Delamere, he was born in June 1820 at Whitegate, Cheshire. He was educated at Rugby School, before going up to Christ Church, Oxford. After gaining his M.A. in 1841, he became a fellow of All Souls College, Oxford. Cholmondley played first-class cricket for the Marylebone Cricket Club (MCC) against Oxford University at Oxford in 1844. Batting twice in the match, he was dismissed in the MCC first innings for 4 runs by Henry Moberly, while in their second innings he opened the batting and was dismissed for the same score by the same bowler. Cholmondeley was ordained in the Church of England and from 1852 was rector at Broadwell with Adlestrop in Gloucestershire. He was made an honorary canon of Gloucester Cathedral in 1877. He died at the rectory at Adlestrop in April 1905. He was married to Mary Leigh, with the couple having nine children, among them the historian Lionel Berners Cholmondeley.
