= Alfred Seymour (cricketer) =

English cricketer

Personal information
- Full name: Alfred Seymour
- Born: 16 February 1843; Brussels, Belgium
- Died: 31 January 1897 (aged 53); Folkestone, Kent, England
- Batting: Unknown

Domestic team information
- Years: Team
- 1869: Lancashire
- 1870: Hampshire

Career statistics
Competition	First-class
Matches	2
Runs scored	47
Batting average	11.75
100s/50s	–/–
Top score	25
Catches/stumpings	1/–
- Source: Cricinfo, 16 January 2010

Alfred Seymour JP (16 February 1843 — 31 January 1897) was an English first-class cricketer and British Army officer.

The third son of the diplomat Sir George Hamilton Seymour and his wife, Gertrude, he was born in Belgium at Brussels in February 1843. He was educated at Rugby School, although he did not represent the college cricket team. Following his education, Seymour enlisted into the 10th Foot by purchasing the rank of ensign in June 1861, before transferring to the 16th Foot the following month. In October of the same year, he transferred again, to the Rifle Brigade. He was promoted to lieutenant in February 1866, and transferred to the 35th Foot in November 1868. He retired from military service in November 1869.

Shortly before his retirement from the army, Seymour made his debut in first-class cricket for Lancashire against Sussex at Hove in August 1869. The following year, he made a single first-class appearance for Hampshire against Lancashire at Old Trafford. He scored 47 runs in these matches, with a highest score of 25. In the early 1870s, he spent two years living in Canada in Toronto. In later life, he was a justice of the peace for Hampshire. Seymour died at Folkestone in January 1897.
