= Hugh Cholmeley =

Hugh Cholmeley may refer to:

- Sir Hugh Cholmeley, 1st Baronet (1600–1657), English MP for Scarborough
- Sir Hugh Cholmeley, 3rd Baronet (c. 1662–1665), of the Cholmeley baronets
- Sir Hugh Cholmeley, 4th Baronet (1632–1689), English MP for Northampton and Thirsk
- Sir Hugh Cholmeley, 3rd Baronet (1839–1904), British MP for Grantham
- Sir Hugh John Francis Sibthorp Cholmeley, 5th Baronet (1906–1964), of the Cholmeley baronets
- Sir (Hugh John), Frederick Sebastian Cholmeley, 7th Baronet (born 1968), of the Cholmeley baronets

== See also ==
- Cholmeley (surname)
- Hugh Cholmondeley (disambiguation)
