= George Hamilton Seymour =

British diplomat

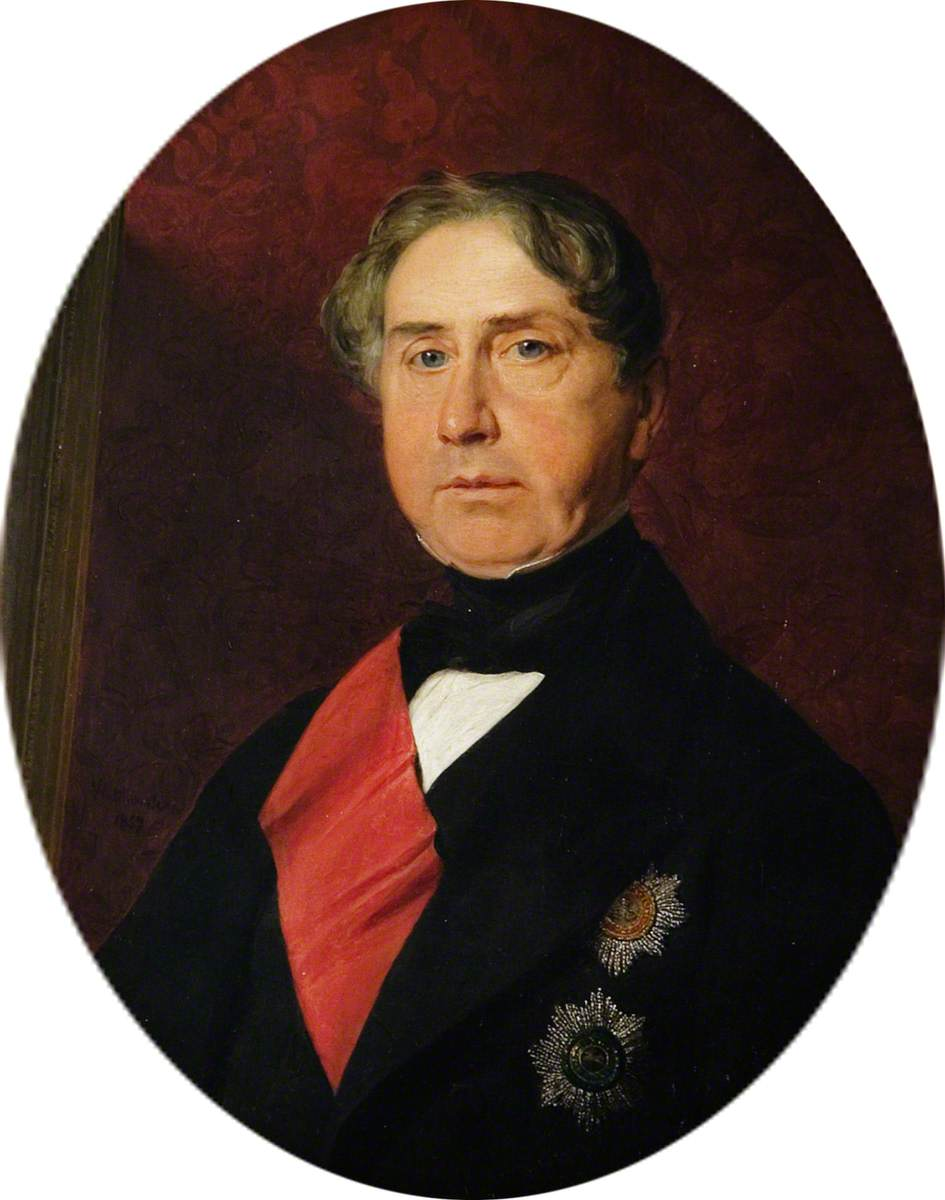

Sir George Hamilton Seymour GCB GCH PC (21 September 1797 – 2 February 1880) was a British diplomat.

Seymour was the son of Lord George Seymour and his wife Isabella, daughter of Rev. George Hamilton. In 1831 he married Gertrude, daughter of Henry Trevor (who later became General Lord Dacre); they had seven children (including the cricketer Alfred Seymour). His daughter, Augusta Emily Seymour, married Hugh Cholmondeley, 2nd Baron Delamere of Vale Royal (b. 3 Oct 1811, d. 1 Aug 1887). He died in February 1880, aged 82. Through his daughter Augusta, he was the maternal grandfather of Hugh Cholmondeley, 3rd Baron Delamere.

Diplomatic posts
| Unknown | Principal Private Secretary to the Secretary of State for Foreign Affairs; 1822 | Succeeded by Lord George Bentinck |
| Preceded by Lord Burghersh as Envoy Extraordinary and Minister Plenipotentiary | Minister Resident to the Grand Duke of Tuscany; 1830–1835 | Succeeded by Ralph Abercromby |
| Preceded by Robert Adair | Envoy Extraordinary and Minister Plenipotentiary to the King of the Belgians; 1836–1845 | Succeeded by Lord Howard de Walden |
| Preceded by Lord Howard de Walden | Envoy Extraordinary and Minister Plenipotentiary to Her Most Faithful Majesty (the Queen of Portugal); 1846–1851 | Succeeded by Sir Richard Pakenham |
| Preceded by John Bloomfield | Envoy Extraordinary and Minister Plenipotentiary at the Court of St Petersburgh; 1851–1854 | Suspended due to the Crimean War Title next held by Lord Wodehouse from 1856 |
| Preceded by The Earl of Westmorland | Envoy Extraordinary and Minister Plenipotentiary to the Emperor of Austria; 1855–1858 | Succeeded by Lord Augustus Loftus |
