= Thomas Cholmondeley (farmer) =

Kenyan farmer

The Honourable Thomas Cholmondeley
- Born: 19 June 1968; Nairobi, Kenya
- Died: 17 August 2016 (aged 48); Nairobi, Kenya
- Education: Eton College
- Occupations: Farmer; businessman
- Spouse: Sally Brewerton (m. 1998; div. 2010)
- Partner: Sally Dudmesh
- Children: 3
- Parents: The 5th Baron Delamere; Ann Renison

Thomas Patrick Gilbert Cholmondeley (/ˈtʃʌmli/ CHUM-lee; 19 June 1968 – 17 August 2016) was a Kenyan farmer. He was the great-grandson of the 3rd Baron Delamere, one of the first and most influential British settlers in Kenya, and was heir to the Delamere title at the time of his death, being the eldest son of the 5th Baron Delamere.

In April 2005, he shot and killed a Kenya Wildlife Service game ranger on his ranch. He claimed self-defence, and the murder case was dropped before going to trial. In May 2006, he shot and killed a poacher on his Soysambu estate near Lake Naivasha. He was acquitted of murder, but found guilty of manslaughter and sentenced to serve eight months in prison. He was released on 23 October 2009, and died in 2016.

== Early life ==
Cholmondeley was a great-grandson of Hugh Cholmondeley, 3rd Baron Delamere (1870–1931), a pioneering settler in Kenya who was the effective "founder" of the White community in that country. Cholmondeley was the only son and heir of the 5th Baron Delamere (b. 1934) and his wife Anne, née Renison. His family is one of the large-scale landowners in Kenya. He was also descended from the family of Sir Robert Walpole, the first Prime Minister of Great Britain.

After prep school at Pembroke House, in the town of Gilgil, Kenya, and Ashdown House School, in the village of Forest Row in East Sussex, England, he was educated at Eton College, from where he was expelled for bad behaviour. After school he worked on various farms for his "pupil year", including time working on Kenneth Matiba's farm, Wangu Embori. He attended the Royal Agricultural College, Cirencester, from 1987 to 1990, and then worked for the Agricultural Mortgage Corporation in Andover, Hampshire.

== Career ==
Back in Kenya from 1991, Cholmondeley started working for the family farming business and was then involved in many developing projects. He decided against returning to Britain, and stayed to work in Kenya, where he was eventually made finance director of the Delamere beef and dairy farms. The Daily Nation reported that the estate became a no-go area for trespassers and locals. As a farmer, he had a reputation for land management and conservation. He established a game cropping enterprise on Soysambu Ranch, the vast family estate in Kenya, which ran from 1992 to 2003, and which employed 15 people as well as building a modern abattoir and cold storage facilities. He was also responsible for the design and layout of the Soysambu Wildlife Sanctuary and the building of Delamere's Camp in 1993, a high-class tourist lodge with a 6,000-acre (24 km^{2}) exclusive sanctuary covering the area around Lake Elmenteita.

He was promoted as director of Delamere Estates in 1994, and the following year the chairman of Nakuru Wildlife Conservancy, a position he was elected to twice again. In his attempts to keep poaching to a minimum he was appointed an honorary game warden. In 1996 he introduced the first centre pivot irrigation into Naivasha and eventually the scheme covered over 600 acres (2.4 km^{2}) and provided employment for approximately 500 people. In the same year he organised the reconstruction of the "Delamere Milk Shop" into a petrol station on the outskirts of Naivasha, the A104 highway. Of note is the constructed wetland to cope with the sewage resulting from over 3,000 customers per day.

His energies turned to building the first straw bale building in Gilgil, the location being on the edge of the Otutu forest. He created the leases and design criteria for two further tourist lodges, Mbweha Camp on the edge of Lake Nakuru National Park, and Mawe Mbili lodge. This is part of the greater plan for the Soysambu Conservancy, together with the establishment of two forestry partnerships covering 510 acres (2.1 km^{2}).

== Shootings ==
On 19 April 2005, Cholmondeley shot game ranger Samson ole Sisina, who was working undercover for the Kenya Wildlife Service on his ranch in Gilgil division, Nakuru District. He arrived at the slaughterhouse after his ranch employees had summoned his help during what seemed to be a robbery. The accusation was that he shot the KWS employee who was dressed in plain clothes, but Cholmondeley insisted it was in self-defence, claiming that the ranger had shot at him first without warning. The Attorney General Amos Wako discontinued the case by issuing a nolle prosequi. This decision was widely criticised by Kenyan media, with many claiming he walked free due to the influence of class and position. There was a public outcry in Nairobi, and from the Maasai who wanted to reclaim ancestral land that was unjustly taken during British colonial rule. Nick Maes, a Sunday Telegraph reporter, years later found a complex man challenged by changing Kenyan conditions, rising criminality in the countryside, and mounting questions about the ethics and legality of colonially derived land in Kenya.

On 10 May 2006, he was taken again into custody for the murder of Robert Njoya Mbugua, an indigenous Kenyan man, looking for food for his family, whom he had discovered on his land with three companions and dogs, carrying the carcass of an antelope. Cholmondeley told police he had shot at the poachers' dogs, which he claimed to be standard practice under Kenya Wildlife Service guidelines, killing two of them, and that he had not intended to shoot Njoya, whom he saw lying wounded in the hedgerow. The dead man's companions disputed that version of events. What was undisputed was that Cholmondeley applied a tourniquet to the bleeding man and shouted for a car to take him to hospital, as well as calling the police.

Cholmondeley was held in detention at the Kamiti Maximum Security Prison after the incident and during the ongoing court proceedings in a cell in the prison outside Nairobi, "like living inside a greasy saucepan infested with rats and cockroaches." Cholmondeley was divorced but a girlfriend, jeweller Sally Dudmesh, visited him in prison every week.

The trial began 25 September 2006. An interlocutory appeal on a question of procedural law was decided on 13 June 2008. He won an appeal to uphold his right to a fair trial. In March 2009, lay assessors in his trial found him not guilty. On 7 May 2009, Judge Muga Apondi, sitting as a single judge and not bound by the lay assessors' verdict, acquitted Cholmondeley of murder but found him guilty of the lesser offence of manslaughter.

The verdict of April 2009 was largely based on the evidence by rally driver Carl Tundo, who had accompanied Cholmondeley to the scene. On 14 May 2009 Cholmondeley was sentenced to serve a further eight months in prison. Apondi said he was imposing a "light" sentence given that he had been imprisoned for three years already, and had tried to help Njoya with first aid and transport to hospital. Cholmondeley was released early for good behaviour in October 2009 after serving five months of his eight-month prison sentence.

In an interview he expressed his opinions:

I've been portrayed as this great monster who goes round shooting black men for sport when my whole life I've striven to move away from racist behaviour ... The problem is I'm a very easy target. I'm a white man, toffee nosed, titled and, on top of that, a white man in Africa ... you know these are really bad things.

While murder carries a mandatory death sentence, manslaughter has a statutory maximum of life imprisonment but with no mandatory minimum sentence under Kenyan law.

BBC Four's Storyville series featured the Cholmondeley trial in an episode titled "Last White Man Standing".

== Personal life ==
Cholmondeley married Sally Brewerton on 16 May 1998. Divorced in 2010, they were the parents of:

- Hugh Cholmondeley, 6th Baron Delamere (b. 1998)
- Henry Cholmondeley (b. 2000)
- Rupert Cholmondeley (b. 2016) son of Wendy Anthony-Hoole

Cholmondeley had been a keen motor sportsman and was Kenya Novice Motocross champion in 1986 and runner-up in the Kenya Enduro championship in 2000. He obtained a private pilot licence in 2000 and flew in Africa and Europe. In 1997 he was gored by a buffalo while walking to a launching site for paragliding in the Maasai Mara.

Cholmondeley died of cardiac arrest on 17 August 2016 while undergoing hip surgery at MP Shah Hospital in Nairobi.

== See also ==
- White people in Kenya
