= Mary Cholmondeley (heiress) =

Mary, Lady Cholmondeley
- Born: Mary Holford baptized 20 January 1562, who Holford, Great Budworth, Cheshire, England
- Died: 15 August 1625; Vale Royal, Whitegate, Cheshire, England
- Resting place: Malpas, Cheshire, England
- Known for: Litigant
- Spouses: Sir Randall Brereton; Sir Hugh Cholmondeley
- Children: 8 children
- Parent(s): Christopher Holford; Elizabeth Mainwaring

Mary, Lady Cholmondeley (née Holford; baptized 20 January 1562 – 15 August 1625) was an English litigant in a 40-year-long dispute over her father's estate. She was the wife of Sir Hugh Cholmondeley (the younger) and had eight children with him.

== Personal life ==
Cholmondeley was born as Mary Holford in late 1562 or January 1563 to Christopher Holford and Elizabeth Mainwaring in Holford manor, Great Budworth, Cheshire, England and christened (baptised) on 20 January 1563. She married, first, Sir Randall Brereton of Malpas but he soon died. Around 1581, she married Sir Hugh Cholmondeley (son of Sir Hugh Cholmondeley). They had eight children, named Robert, Hatton, Hugh, Thomas, Francis, Mary, Lettice, and Frances, before Sir Hugh's death in 1601. Mary Cholmondeley died on 15 August 1625 at the age of sixty-three in Vale Royal, Whitegate, Cheshire, England and was buried the next day in the church at Malpas, Cheshire, England.

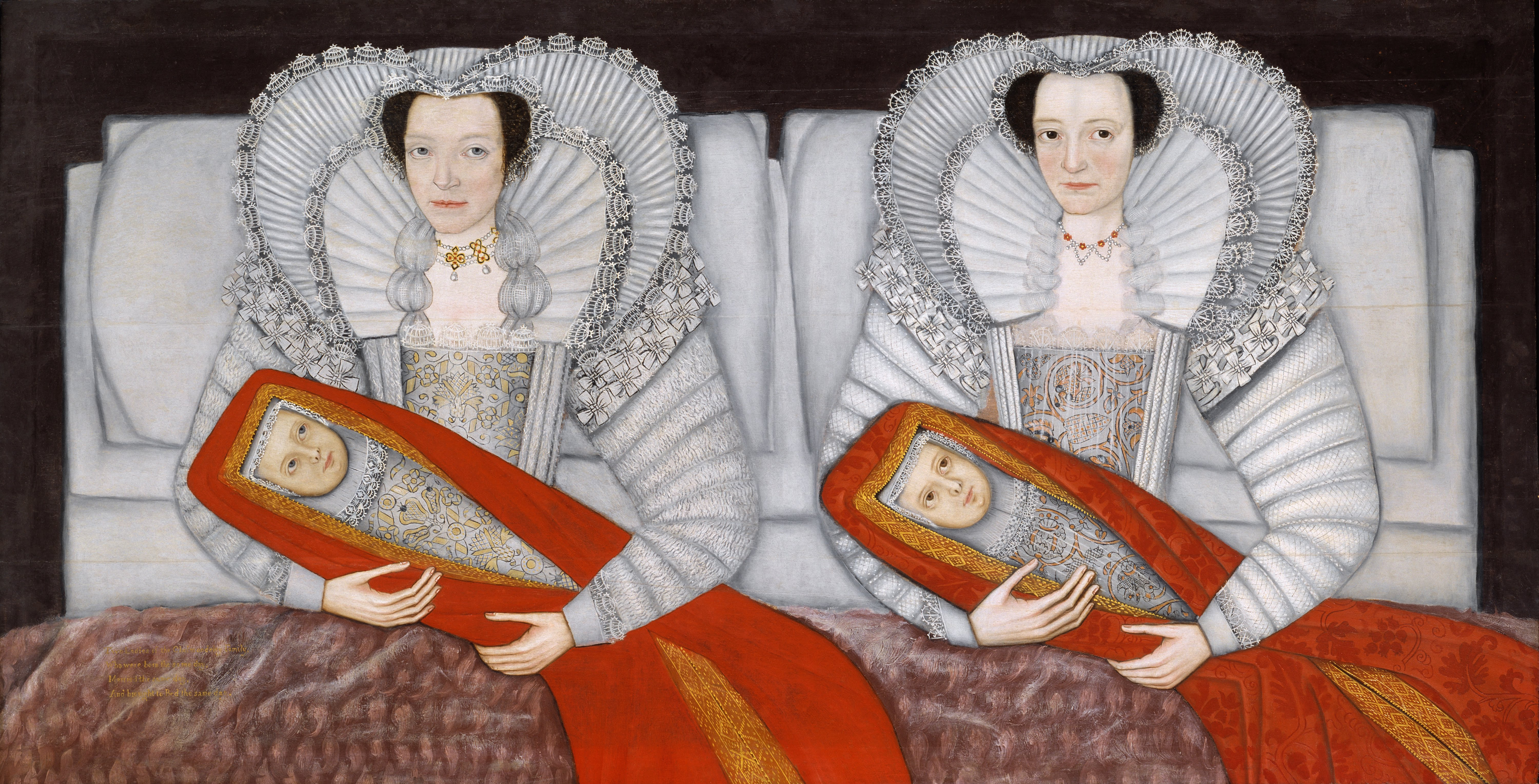
The women pictured in The Cholmondeley Ladies, painted c. 1600-1610, are said to be Mary's daughters or nieces.

== Legal dispute over family estate ==
Cholmondeley came to notice following the legal disputes over Holford Manor and the estates of her father, Christopher Holford, who died on 27 January 1581. His half-brother, George Holford of Newborough, was the next male-heir of the Holfords, but the recently married Mary challenged his legal claim to the land. The lawsuit between them went on for forty years.

Finally, around 1620, they came to a settlement, under which Mary Cholmondeley received the Holford manorhouse and George Holford received the manor of Iscoit in Flintshire. The case was not settled but intercession led to Mary agreeing to share the estate with those who disputed her title. However it was Mary that inherited the manor. She renovated and enlarged the Holford manorhouse.

== Renovation of Vale Royal Abbey ==
In 1615, nearly a century after the Dissolution of the Monasteries, Mary Cholmondeley bought Vale Royal Abbey and its surrounding land. She built a house on the site, rebuilt the old hall, and in 1625 added a lath and plaster wing. James I held court at Vale Royal for three days and dubbed Mary Cholmondeley the "bolde lady of Cheshire" because she rebuffed his offer to advance the political careers of her sons. She lived at Vale Royal from 1616 to her death.
