= Hugh Cholmondeley, 1st Earl of Cholmondeley =

English noble

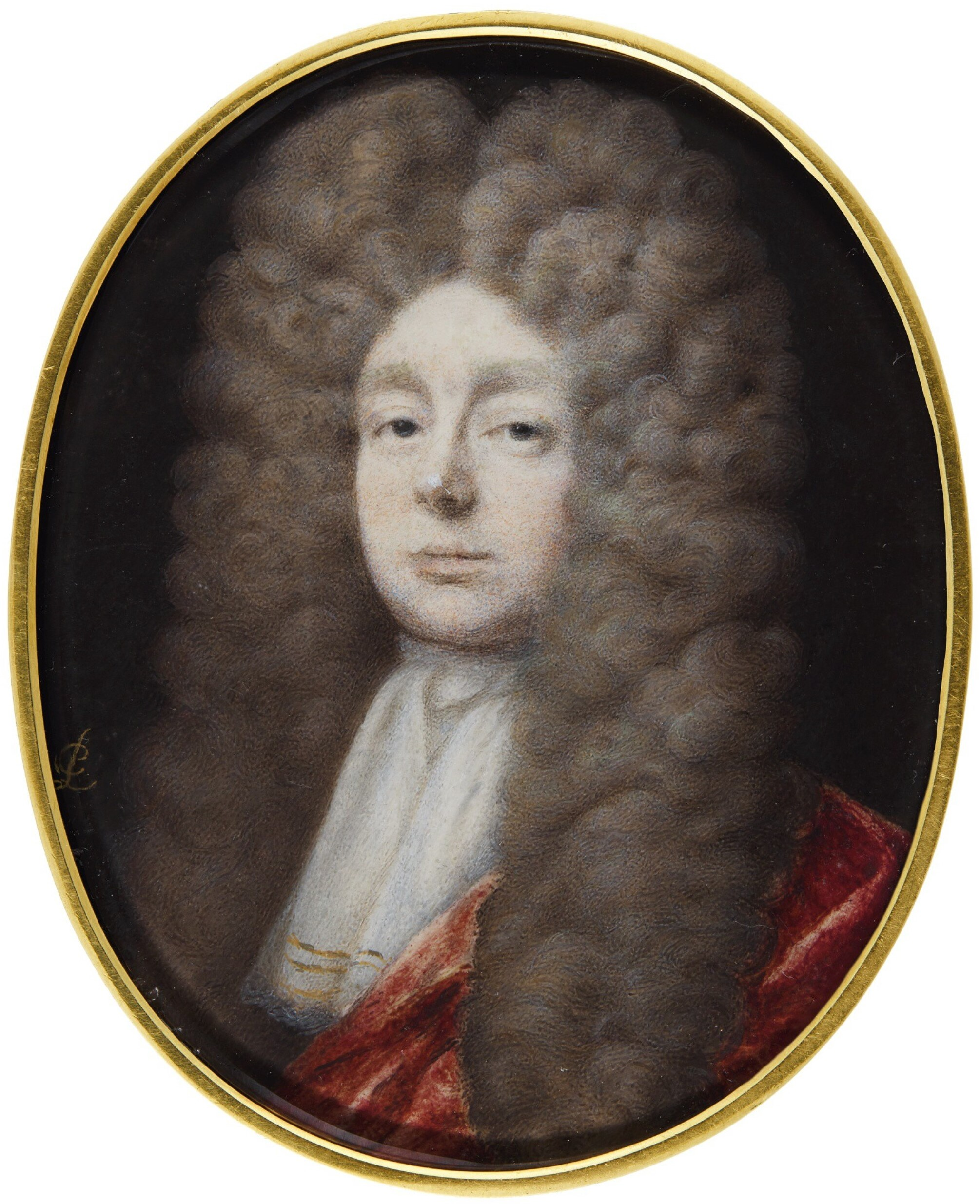
Portrait of Hugh, Baron Cholmondeley, later 1st Earl of Cholmondeley

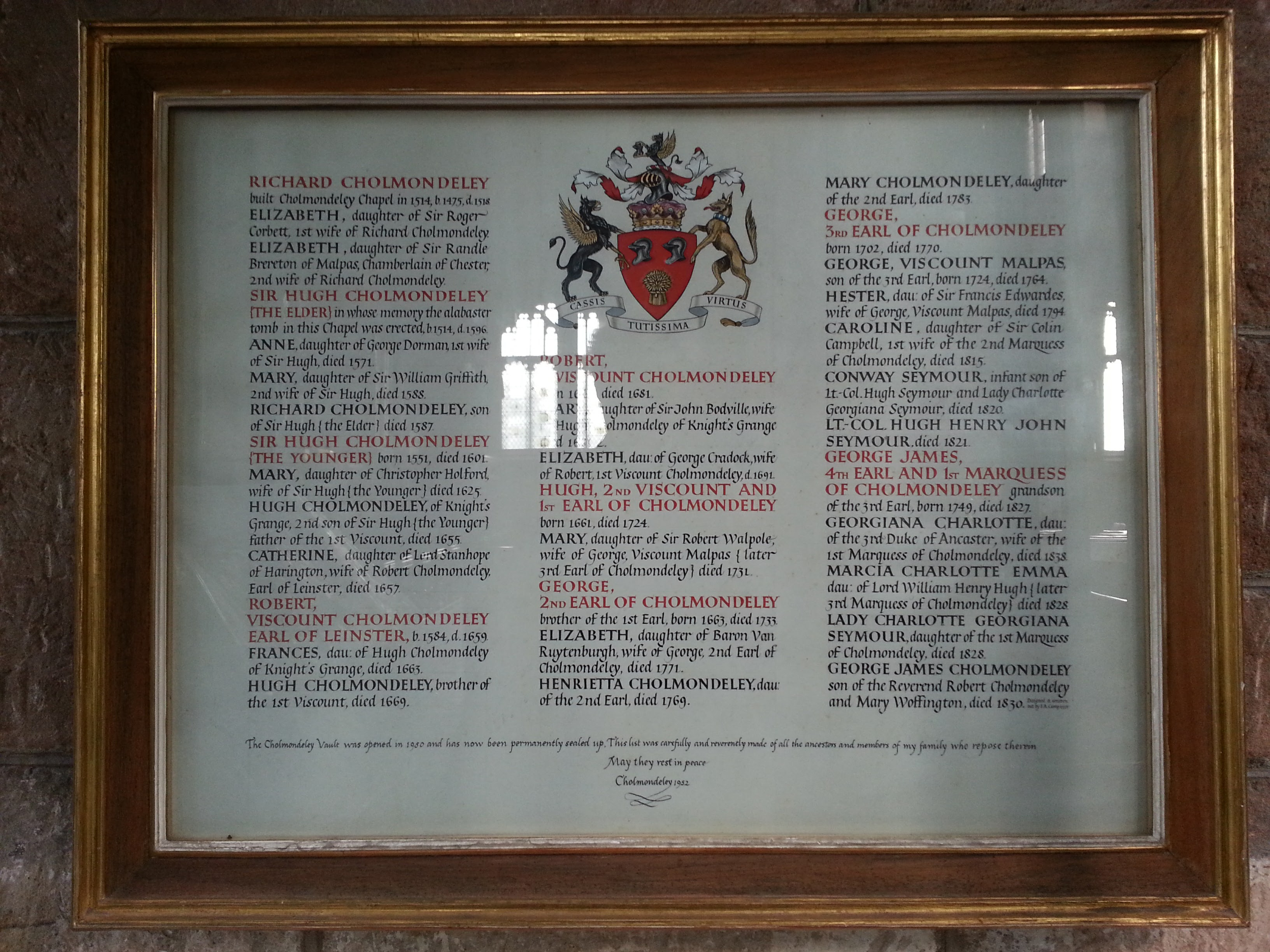
Cholmondeley's listing in the family vault at St Oswald's Church, Malpas

Hugh Cholmondeley, 1st Earl of Cholmondeley, PC (1662 – 18 January 1725), styled The Honourable from birth until 1681 and then known as Viscount Cholmondeley to 1706, was an English peer and politician.

Cholmondeley was the eldest son of Robert Cholmondeley, 1st Viscount Cholmondeley, and Elizabeth Cradock, and was educated at Christ Church, Oxford. In 1681 he succeeded his father as second Viscount Cholmondeley, but as this was an Irish peerage it did not entitle him to a seat in the English House of Lords. He supported the claim of William and Mary to the English throne, and after their accession in 1689 he was rewarded when he was made Baron Cholmondeley, of Namptwich in the County of Chester, in the Peerage of England (which gave him a seat in the House of Lords). The peerage was created with remainder to his younger brother George. In 1706 he was admitted to the Privy Council and made Viscount Malpas, in the County of Chester, and Earl of Cholmondeley, in the County of Chester, with similar remainder.

Lord Cholmondeley was appointed Comptroller of the Household by Queen Anne in 1708. He held this post only until October of the same year, when he was made Treasurer of the Household. He was stripped of this office in 1713 but restored when George I became king in 1714. He also served as Lord Lieutenant of Anglesey, Caernarvonshire, Denbighshire, Flintshire, Merionethshire and Montgomeryshire from 1702 to 1713 and from 1714 to 1725 and of Cheshire between 1703 and 1713 and 1714 and 1725.

Lord Cholmondeley died in January 1725. He never married and was succeeded in his titles by his younger brother George, who had already been elevated to the peerage in his own right as Baron Newborough.

Political offices
Preceded by Sir Thomas Mansel	Comptroller of the Household; 1708	Succeeded by Sir Thomas Felton
Preceded by The Earl of Bradford	Treasurer of the Household; 1708–1713	Succeeded by The Lord Lansdown
Preceded by The Lord Lansdown	Treasurer of the Household; 1714–1725	Succeeded by Paul Methuen
Military offices
Preceded by Peter Shakerley	Governor of Chester; 1705–1713	Succeeded by Thomas Ashton
Preceded by Thomas Ashton	Governor of Chester; 1714–1725	Succeeded by The Earl of Cholmondeley
Honorary titles
Preceded by The Earl of Derby	Lord Lieutenant of North Wales (Anglesey, Caernarvonshire, Denbighshire, Flintshire, Merionethshire and Montgomeryshire); 1702–1713	Succeeded by The Earl of Plymouth
Preceded by The Earl Rivers	Lord Lieutenant of Cheshire; 1703–1713	Succeeded by The Earl of Plymouth
Preceded by The Earl Rivers	Vice-Admiral of Cheshire; 1703–1725	Succeeded by The Earl of Cholmondeley
Preceded by The Earl of Plymouth	Lord Lieutenant of Cheshire and North Wales; 1714–1725	Succeeded by The Earl of Cholmondeley
Peerage of England
New creation	Earl of Cholmondeley; 1706–1725	Succeeded by George Cholmondeley
New creation	Baron Cholmondeley; 1689–1725	Succeeded by George Cholmondeley
Peerage of Ireland
Preceded by Robert Cholmondeley	Viscount Cholmondeley; 1681–1725	Succeeded by George Cholmondeley
