= Thomas Cholmondeley, 4th Baron Delamere =

British peer (1900–1979)

Captain The Right Honourable The Lord Delamere
- Born: Hon. Thomas Pitt Hamilton Cholmondeley; 19 August 1900; Withington, Lancashire, England
- Died: 13 April 1979 (aged 78); Naivasha, Kenya
- Education: Eton College
- Occupations: Farmer, soldier
- Spouses: Phyllis Scott (m. 1924; div. 1944) Ruth Mary Ashley (m. 1944; div. 1955) Diana Caldwell (m. 1955)
- Children: Hon. Elizabeth Cholmondeley; Hon. Anne Garnett; Hugh Cholmondeley, 5th Baron Delamere
- Parents: Hugh Cholmondeley, 3rd Baron Delamere; Lady Florence Anne Cole

Captain Thomas Pitt Hamilton Cholmondeley, 4th Baron Delamere (/ˈtʃʌmli/ CHUM-lee; 19 August 1900 – 13 April 1979), styled The Honourable Thomas Cholmondeley from birth until 1931, was a British peer. Popularly known (from 1931) as Tom Delamere, he lived on and leased the vast estate known as Soysambu Ranch in Kenya.

== Early life ==
Cholmondeley was the eldest son of Hugh Cholmondeley, 3rd Baron Delamere, whom he succeeded in 1931. His mother was Lady Florence Anne Cole, an Anglo-Irish aristocrat who was the daughter of Lowry Cole, 4th Earl of Enniskillen. Cholmondeley was a descendant of the family of Sir Robert Walpole, the first Prime Minister of Great Britain. He was educated at Eton. During the Second World War he served with the Welsh Guards and achieved the rank of Captain.

== Lands and estates ==
In this period, the Cholmondeley family continued to own ancestral land and estates in Cheshire in the North of England. However, Lord Delamere lived, worked and invested most of his life in building modern Kenya. In 1934, Tom Delamere moved his family into Vale Royal Abbey, only to be forced out in 1939 when His Majesty's Government converted Vale Royal to serve as a sanatorium for soldiers of World War II. The Cholmondeleys were restored to possession of the abbey after the war, but by 1947 the house and grounds had been sold.

== Personal life ==
Cholmondeley married on 14 June 1924, Phyllis Anne Scott, daughter of Lord George William Montagu Douglas Scott (younger son of The 6th Duke of Buccleuch) and Lady Elizabeth Emily Manners (daughter of The 7th Duke of Rutland). The children of that marriage were:

- The Hon. Elizabeth Florence Marion (26 December 1926 – 1988).
- The Hon. Anne Jeannetta Essex (2 September 1928 – 18 October 2013).
- Hugh George (18 January 1934 – 7 October 2024).

Cholmondely had become Baron Delamere (in 1931) by the time he and Baroness Delamere were divorced in 1944. Lord Delamere remarried on 15 June 1944 to The Hon. Ruth Mary Clarisse Ashley, daughter of the then late Lt. Col. Lord Mount Temple (a former Conservative Cabinet minister), who was the first (and only) Baron Mount Temple (of the second creation), and Amalia Mary Maud Cassel. This second marriage ended in divorce in 1955.

On 26 March 1955, Lord Delamere married, thirdly, Diana Caldwell, daughter of Seymore Caldwell, better known as Diana Delves-Broughton.

== Death ==
Baron Delamere died at age 78 in April 1979; and he was succeeded in the lands, estates and title by his son from his first marriage, Hugh Cholmondeley, 5th Baron Delamere.

== Notes ==
Peerage of the United Kingdom
Preceded by Hugh Cholmondeley	Baron Delamere; 1931–1979	Succeeded by Hugh Cholmondeley
