= Thomas Cholmondeley (1726–1779) =

18th-century British politician

The Honourable Thomas Cholmondeley
- Arms of Cholmondeley: Gules, in chief two esquire's helmets argent in base a garb or

Member of Parliament for Cheshire
- In office 1756–1768

Personal details
- Born: 24 June 1726 Vale Royal, Cheshire
- Died: 2 June 1779 (aged 52)
- Resting place: Church Minshull, Cheshire
- Spouse: Dorothy Cowper
- Children: Thomas Cholmondeley, 1st Baron Delamere; Charles Cholmondeley; Charles Cholmondeley; Hugh Cholmondeley; Francis Cholmondeley; Robert Cholmondeley; Hester Cholmondeley; Essex Cholmondeley; Dorothy Cholmondeley
- Parents: Charles Cholmondeley; Essex Pitt
- Education: St. John’s College, Cambridge

Thomas Cholmondeley (24 June 1726 – 2 June 1779), of Vale Royal, Cheshire was a British landowner and Tory politician who sat in the House of Commons between 1756 and 1768. He was elected MP for Cheshire in 1756 and 1761.

== Biography ==
Cholmondeley was born on 24 June 1726, the third son of Charles Cholmondeley (1685 – 1756) of Vale Royal, Cheshire and Essex Pitt, daughter of Thomas Pitt of Stratford, Wiltshire. He attended Westminster School from 1740 to 1743 and was admitted to St. John’s College, Cambridge in 1743.

On 29 October 1764, he married Dorothy Cowper, daughter of Edmund Cowper of Overleigh Hall in Cheshire, by whom he had six sons and three daughters:

- Hester Cholmondeley (9 July 1766 – 24 September 1802), married John Drummond, son of banker John Drummond)
- Thomas Cholmondeley, 1st Baron Delamere (1767–1855)
- Charles Cholmondeley (13 October 1768 – 26 October 1768), died in infancy
- Charles Cholmondeley (6 June 1770 – 5 December 1846), married on 13 January 1794, Caroline-Elizabeth Smyth (1773–1818), daughter of Nicholas Smyth of Cubley, Shropshire; sister and coheir of Nicholas Owen Smyth Owen of Condover.
- Essex Cholmondeley (29 October 1771 – buried 4 November 1848)
- Hugh Cholmondeley (18 December 1772 – 25 November 1815), Dean of Chester
- Francis Cholmondeley (1775–1802), died unmarried
- Dorothy Cholmondeley (bapt. 29 October 1776 – 18 March 1853), married Thomas Parker of Astle Hall
- Robert Cholmondeley (9 February 1778 – 1856)

He died on 2 June was buried on 8 June 1779 at Church Minshull, Cheshire.

== Sources ==
- Drummond, Mary M. (1964). "Cholmondeley, Thomas (1726-79), of Vale Royal, Cheshire". In Namier, L.; Brooke, J. (eds.). The History of Parliament: the House of Commons 1754-1790 – via History of Parliament Online.
- Ormerod, George; Helsby, Thomas (1882). The History of the County Palatine and City of Chester: Compiled from Original Evidences in Public Offices the Harleian and Cottonian Mss. Parochial Registers Private Muniments Unpublished Ms. Collections of Successive Cheshire Antiquaries and a Personal Survey of Every Township in the County; Incorporated with a Republication of King's Hale Royal and Leycester's Cheshire Antiquities. Vol. 2 (2nd ed.). George Routledge and Sons. OCLC 223243317.
