= Robert Cholmondeley, 1st Earl of Leinster =

English politician (1584–1659)

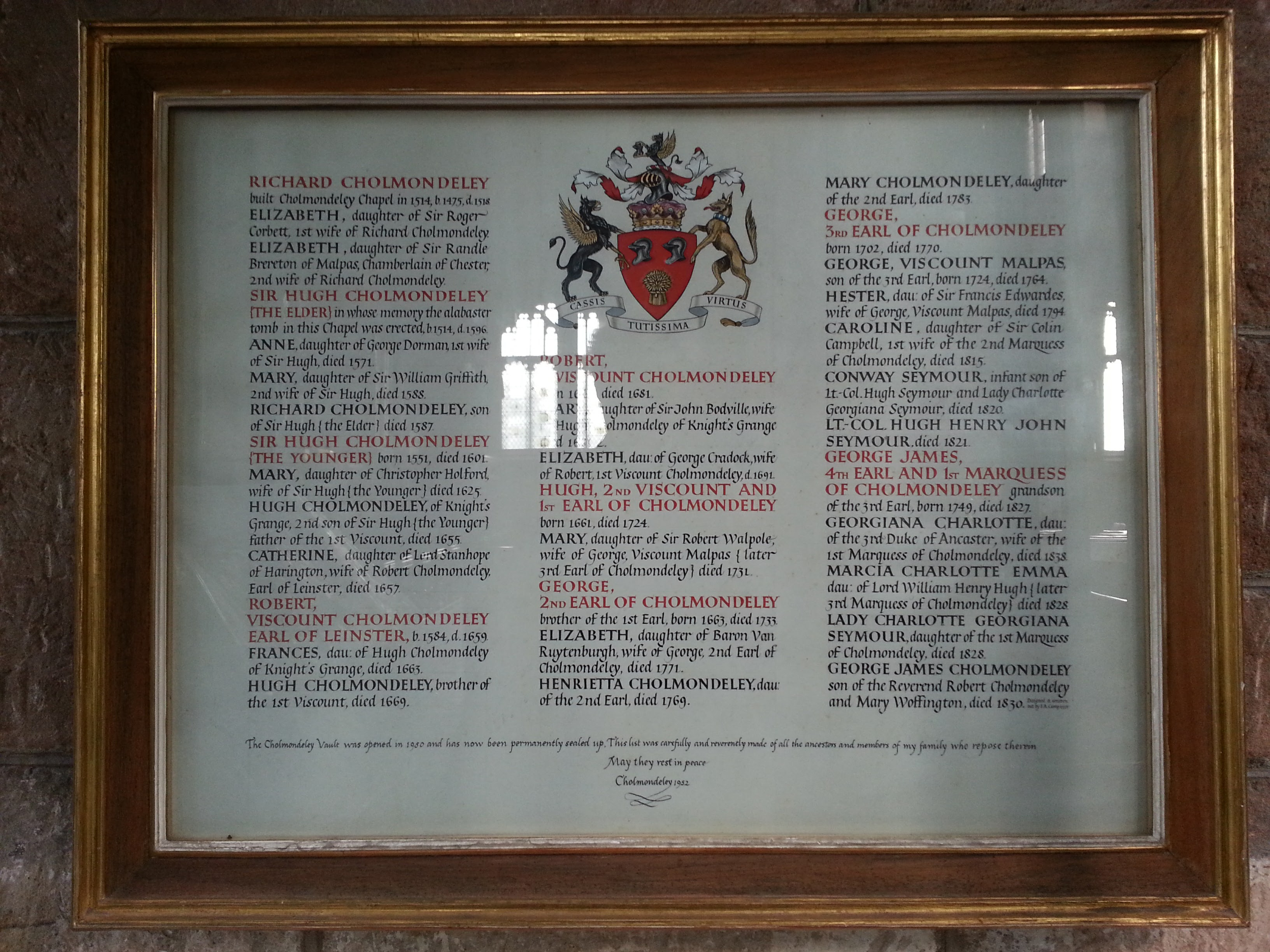
Cholmondeley's listing in the family vault at St Oswald's Church, Malpas.

Robert Cholmondeley, 1st Earl of Leinster (/ˈtʃʌmli/ CHUM-lee; 26 June 1584 – 8 October 1659), was an English Royalist and supporter of Charles I during the English Civil War.

== Life ==
Cholmondeley was born in Crouchend, Highgate, Middlesex, on 26 June 1584, the son of Sir Hugh Cholmondeley and Mary Holford (daughter of Christopher Holford of Holford). He was created a Baronet on 29 June 1611.

He was High Sheriff of Cheshire in 1620 and served as MP for Cheshire in 1625. He was created Viscount Cholmondeley of Kells (Ireland) in 1628 and Baron Cholmondeley of Wich Malbank (i.e. Nantwich in Cheshire) on 1 September 1645. On 5 March 1646, he was created Earl of Leinster in Ireland.

He died 2 October 1659, and was buried in the chancel of Malpas church.

== Family ==
He was married to Catherine Stanhope (daughter of John Stanhope, Lord of Harrington, and sister of Charles Stanhope, Lord Stanhope of Harrington). He died at Cholmondeley on 8 October 1659 and was buried at Malpas. He had no surviving legitimate issue so the family estates passed to his nephew, Robert Cholmondeley, son of his brother Hugh. His titles expired at his death but in 1661 the title of Viscount Cholmondeley was recreated for his nephew.

Parliament of England
Preceded by William Booth; William Brereton	Member of Parliament for Cheshire; 1624; With: Sir Anthony St John	Succeeded by Sir Richard Grosvenor, Bt; Peter Daniel
Baronetage of England
New creation	Baronet (of Cholmondeley); 1611–1659	Extinct
Peerage of England
New creation	Baron Cholmondeley; 1645–1659	Extinct
Peerage of Ireland
New creation	Earl of Leinster; 1646–1659	Extinct
New creation	Viscount Cholmondeley; 1628–1659	Extinct
