= Hugh Cholmondeley, 2nd Baron Delamere =

British politician

The Right Honourable The Lord Delamere
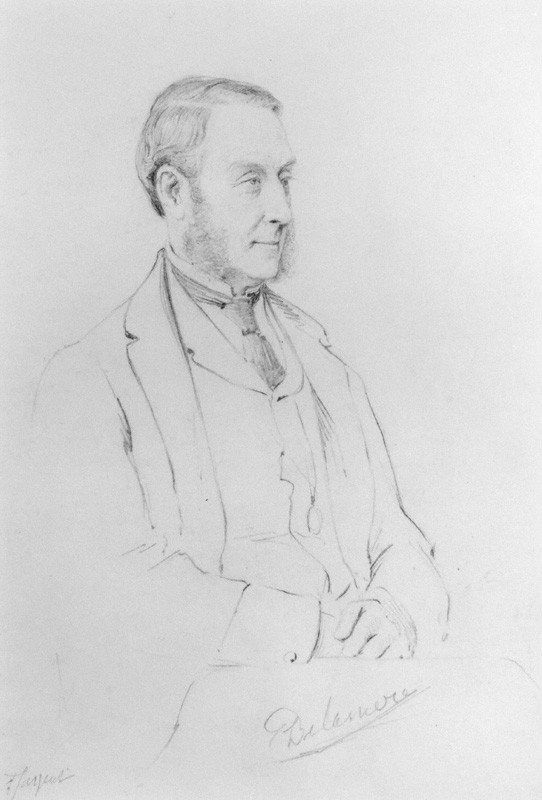
- Pencil drawing of Hugh Cholmondeley, circa 1860s or 1870s
- Born: 3 October 1811; Vale Royal, Cheshire, England
- Died: 1 August 1887 (aged 75); Vale Royal, Cheshire, England
- Education: Eton College
- Occupation: Politician
- Spouses: Lady Sarah Hay-Drummond (m. 1848; died 1859) Augusta Seymour (m. 1860)
- Children: Hugh Cholmondeley, 3rd Baron Delamere; Hon. Sybil Burnaby
- Parents: Thomas Cholmondeley, 1st Baron Delamere; Henrietta Williams-Wynn

Hugh Cholmondeley, 2nd Baron Delamere (/ˈtʃʌmli/ CHUM-lee; 3 October 1811 – 1 August 1887), styled The Honourable from 1821 until 1855, was a British peer and politician.

== Personal ==
Hugh Cholmondeley was the eldest son of Thomas Cholmondeley. His mother was Henrietta Elizabeth Williams-Wynn, daughter of Sir Watkin Williams-Wynn, 4th Baronet, and Charlotte Grenville, and a granddaughter of Prime Minister George Grenville. Lord Delamere was an indirect descendant of Sir Robert Walpole, the first Prime Minister of Great Britain.

In 1848, Cholmondeley married Lady Sarah Hay-Drummond, daughter of Thomas Hay-Drummond, 11th Earl of Kinnoull; and the couple were childless when she died in 1859. He married again in 1860, this time to Augusta Emily Seymour, daughter of Sir George Hamilton Seymour. The children of that marriage were:

- Hugh Cholmondeley, 3rd Baron Delamere (28 April 1870 – 13 November 1931); married, firstly, Lady Florence Cole, daughter of Lowry Cole, 4th Earl of Enniskillen, and Charlotte Baird, in 1899; had issue. He married, secondly, in 1928, Gwladys Beckett, who later became the second female Mayor of Nairobi.
- Hon. Sybil Cholmondeley (29 December 1871 – 26 May 1911); married Algernon Edwyn Burnaby and had issue.

Lady Delamere died in 1911.

== Career ==
Cholmondeley was elected to Parliament for Denbighshire as a Tory in 1840, a seat he held until 1841, and then represented Montgomery from 1841 to 1847. In 1855, Cholmondeley was called to the House of Lords when he succeeded his father as second Baron Delamere.

== Lands and estates ==
In this period, Baron Delamere and his family were inextricable from the history of Cheshire and married into the Hibbert Family of Birtles Hall, Cheshire who had made their fortune in Jamaica. The family seat was at Vale Royal Abbey.

Baron Delamere died at age 75 in August 1887; and he was succeeded in the lands, estates and title by the son from his second marriage, Hugh Cholmondeley.

== Notes ==
Parliament of the United Kingdom
Preceded by Sir Watkin Williams-Wynn, 5th Bt; William Bagot	Member of Parliament for Denbighshire; 1840–1841; With: William Bagot	Succeeded by William Bagot; Sir Watkin Williams-Wynn, 6th Bt
Preceded by John Edwards	Member of Parliament for Montgomery; 1841–1847	Succeeded by David Pugh
Peerage of the United Kingdom
Preceded by Thomas Cholmondeley	Baron Delamere; 1855–1887	Succeeded by Hugh Cholmondeley
