= Hugh Cholmondeley (soldier) =

English soldier

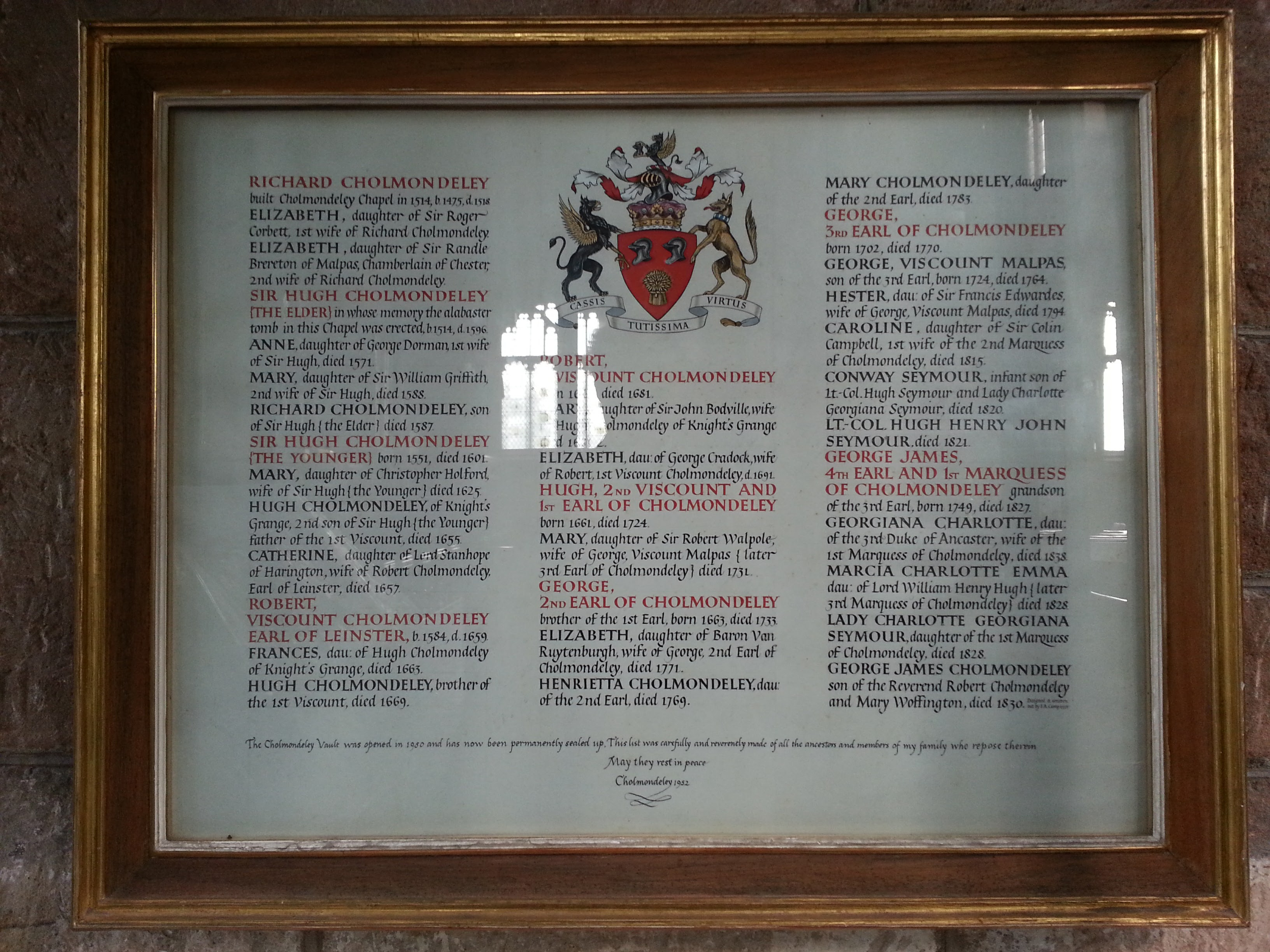
Cholmondeley's listing in the family vault at St Oswald's Church, Malpas

Sir Hugh Cholmondeley (1513 – 6 January 1596) was an English soldier.

== Life ==
Cholmondeley was the second son of Richard Cholmondeley (not to be confused with a cousin, Richard Cholmondeley) and Elizabeth Brereton. The Cholmondeley family had held the lordship of Cholmondeley in Cheshire since the time of the Norman Conquest. He succeeded his elder brother who died in 1539.

He fought against the Scots in 1542 and for this he was knighted by King Henry VIII. In 1557, he raised one hundred men at his own expense and joined the Earl of Derby in his expedition against an invading Scottish army. Apart from his military career he was also High Sheriff (six times between 1547 and 1588), Deputy Lieutenant of Cheshire (1569, 1585, 1587), Custos Rotulorum of Cheshire (1579 to his death) and High Sheriff of Flintshire for 1582–83.

== Family ==
Cholmondeley married heiress Ann Dorman, daughter of George Dorman of Malpas.

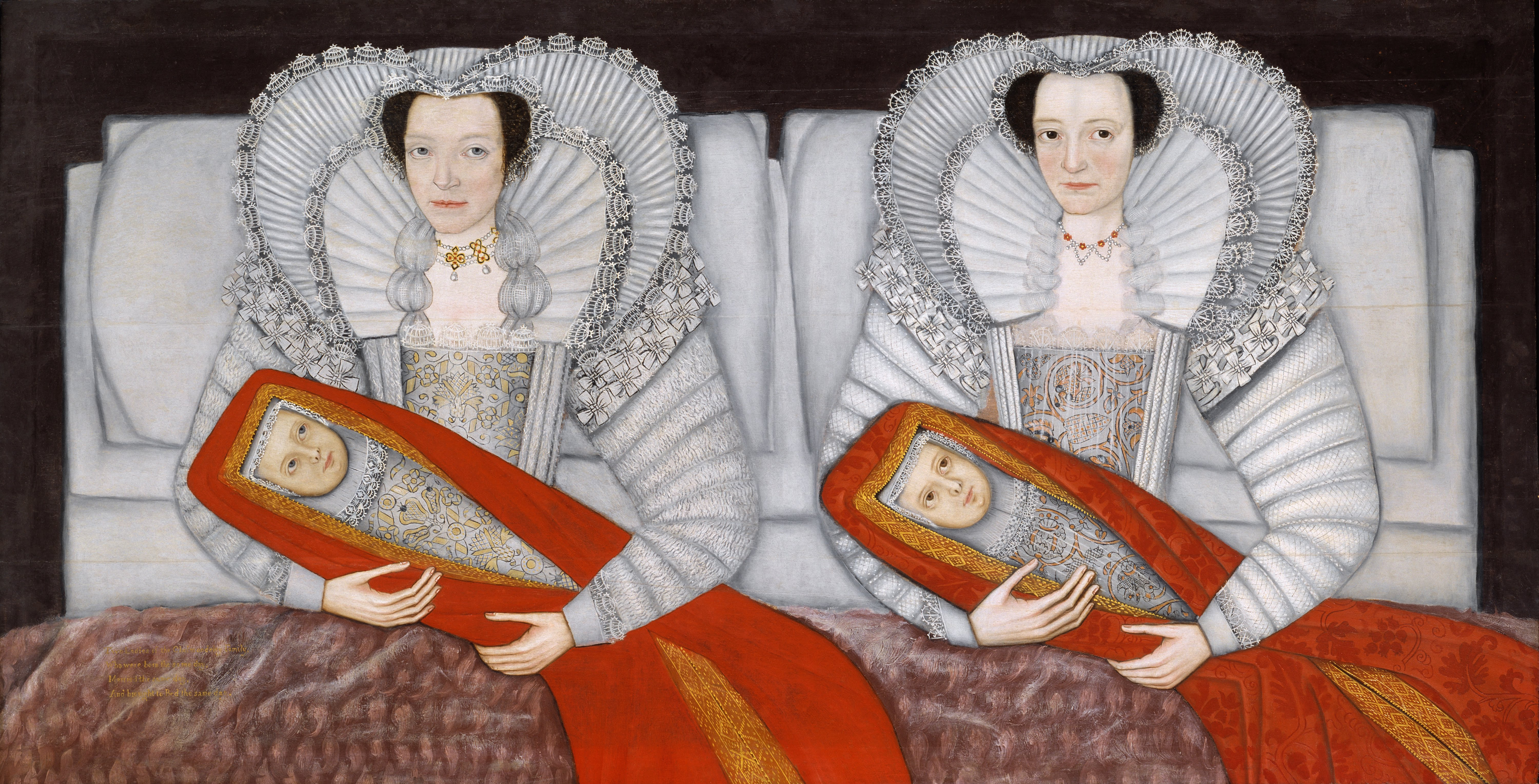
Lettice, Lady Grosvenor, and her sister, Lady Mary Calverley, ca. 1604

Cholmondeley died in January 1596 and was buried at Malpas. He was succeeded by his son, Sir Hugh Cholmondeley (MP for Cheshire in 1585, knighted in 1588, and High Sheriff of Cheshire for 1589).

Sir Hugh the younger (1552–1601) married Mary Holford and had five sons and three daughters. Their eldest son Robert was created Earl of Leinster in 1646; another son, Hugh, was the ancestor of the Marquesses of Cholmondeley; while yet another son, Thomas, was the ancestor of the Barons Delamere; his daughter Lettice Cholmondeley married Sir Richard Grosvenor, 1st Baronet. His wife Lady Cholmondeley gained fame in her own right for her lawsuit against her uncle George Holford over the inheritance of her father's estates.

== Sources ==
- "Cholmley (Cholmondeley), Sir Hugh (by 1513-97), of Cholmondeley, Cheshire". History of Parliament Online.
- Kidd, Charles, Williamson, David (editors). Debrett's Peerage and Baronetage (1990 edition). New York: St Martin's Press, 1990.
