= Robert Cholmondeley, 1st Viscount Cholmondeley =

Anglo-Irish noble

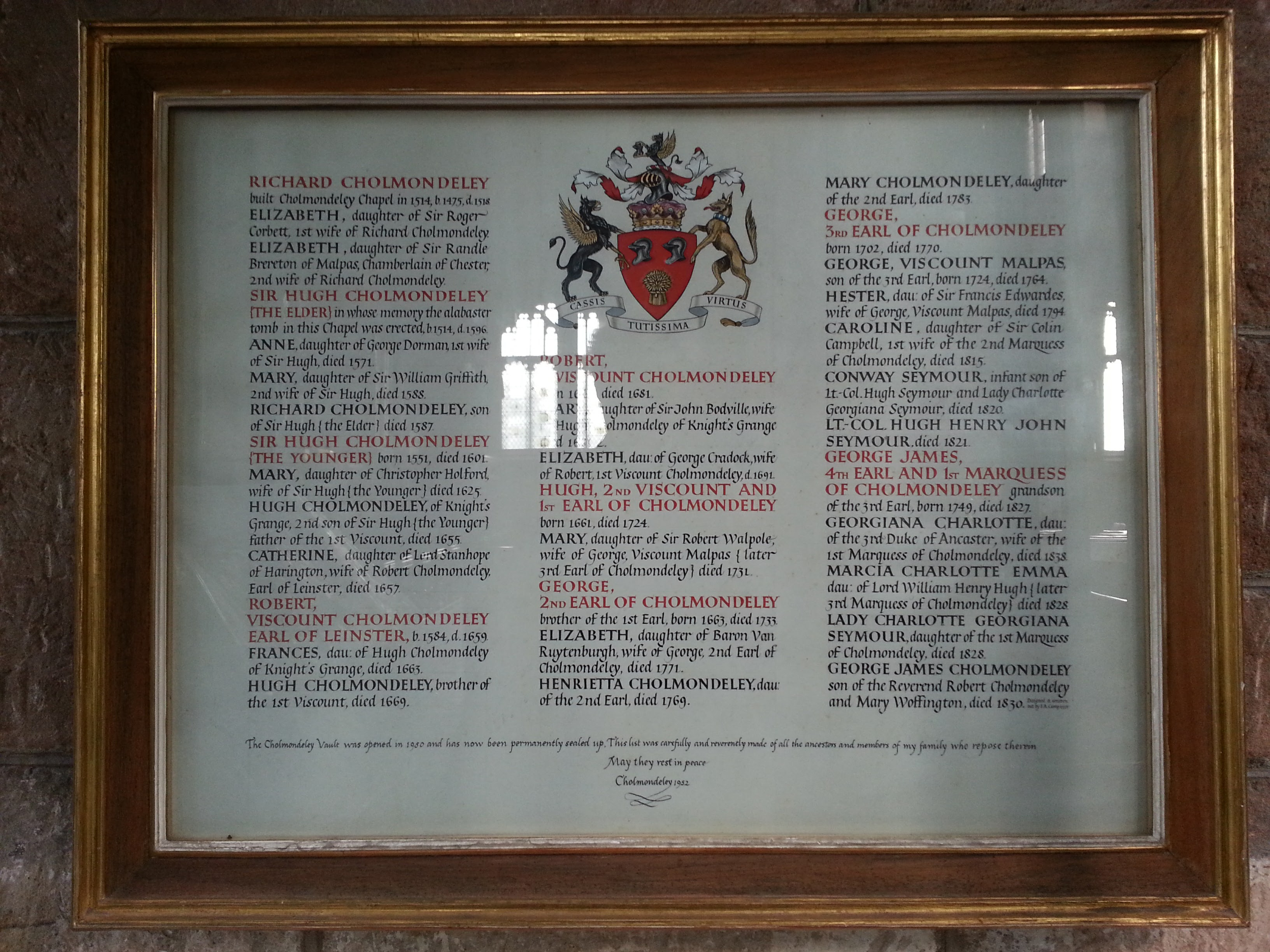
Cholmondeley's listing in the family vault at St Oswald's Church, Malpas

Robert Cholmondeley, 1st Viscount Cholmondeley (died 22 May 1681) was an English peer.

Lord Cholmondeley was the son of Hugh Cholmondeley and Mary Bodvile. Sir Hugh Cholmondeley was his grandfather and Robert Cholmondeley, 1st Earl of Leinster, his uncle. He succeeded to the estates of his uncle Lord Leinster in 1659 and two years later he was raised to the Peerage of Ireland as Viscount Cholmondeley, of Kells in the County of Meath. Cholmondeley married Elizabeth Cradock, daughter of George Cradock of Caverswall Castle. They had five children:

- Hon. Elizabeth Cholmondeley, second wife of John Egerton, of Egerton and Oulton
- Hugh Cholmondeley, 1st Earl of Cholmondeley (1662–1725)
- Hon. Robert Cholmondeley (d. 1678)
- George Cholmondeley, 2nd Earl of Cholmondeley (1666–1673)
- Hon. Richard Cholmondeley (c.1668 – 5 June 1680)

He died in May 1681, and was succeeded in the viscountcy by his eldest son Hugh, who was created Earl of Cholmondeley in 1706. His second surviving son George became a prominent soldier.

Peerage of Ireland
New creation	Viscount Cholmondeley; 1661–1681	Succeeded by Hugh Cholmondeley
