= Hugh Cholmondeley, 5th Baron Delamere =

British hereditary peer (1934–2024)

The Right Honourable The Lord Delamere

Member of the House of Lords
- Lord Temporal
- as a hereditary peer 13 April 1979 – 11 November 1999
- Preceded by: The 4th Baron Delamere
- Succeeded by: Seat abolished (Note: Under the House of Lords Act 1999.)

Personal details
- Born: Hugh George Cholmondeley; 18 January 1934 London, England
- Died: 7 October 2024 (aged 90) Soysambu Ranch, Kenya
- Party: Crossbench
- Spouse: Anne Renison (m. 1964)
- Children: The Hon. Thomas Cholmondeley
- Parents: Thomas Cholmondeley, 4th Baron Delamere; Phyllis Montagu Douglas Scott
- Education: Eton College; Magdalene College, Cambridge
- Occupation: Farmer

Hugh George Cholmondeley, 5th Baron Delamere (/ˈtʃʌmli/ CHUM-lee; 18 January 1934 – 7 October 2024), styled The Honourable Hugh George Cholmondeley from birth until 1979, was a British peer. He was a well-known figure in the evolution and development of post-colonial Kenya, having inherited the Soysambu ranch, which had been in the family since 1906.

== Family and education ==
Delamere was born in Kensington, London, on 18 January 1934, the eldest son of Thomas Pitt Hamilton Cholmondeley, 4th Baron Delamere (1900−1979) and Phyllis Anne Montagu Douglas Scott (1904−1978), granddaughter of both the 6th Duke of Buccleuch and the 7th Duke of Rutland. Delamere was also descended from the family of Sir Robert Walpole, the first Prime Minister of Great Britain. He was educated at Eton College and Magdalene College, Cambridge, where he was awarded a BA in 1955 and an MA in 1959.

On 11 April 1964, he married Anne Willoughby Renison, daughter of Sir Patrick Muir Renison, former Governor of Kenya, and had one son, who predeceased him:

- The Hon. Thomas Patrick Gilbert Cholmondeley (19 January 1968 – 17 August 2016)

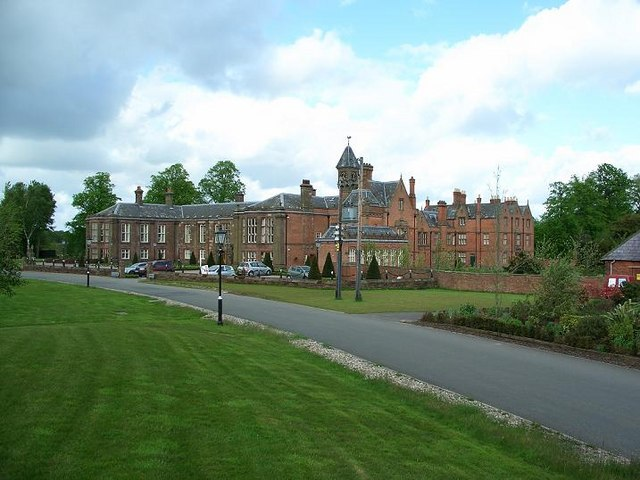
Vale Royal Great House, formerly the seat of the Barons of Delamere – sold in 1947

Delamere died at the Soysambu ranch on 7 October 2024, at the age of 90. His grandson, Hugh Cholmondeley (born 1998), succeeded him as 6th Baron Delamere.

== Work in Kenya ==
Delamere, who spent most of his life in Kenya, played a role in the country's post-colonial evolution and development. He resided at Sugoni Farm on the Soysambu estate.

== Notes ==
Peerage of the United Kingdom
Preceded by Thomas Cholmondeley, 4th Baron	Baron Delamere; 1979–2024; Member of the House of Lords (1979–1999)	Succeeded by Hugh Cholmondeley, 6th Baron
