= SS Persia (1900) =

British passenger liner

Coordinates: 34°10′00″N 26°00′00″E

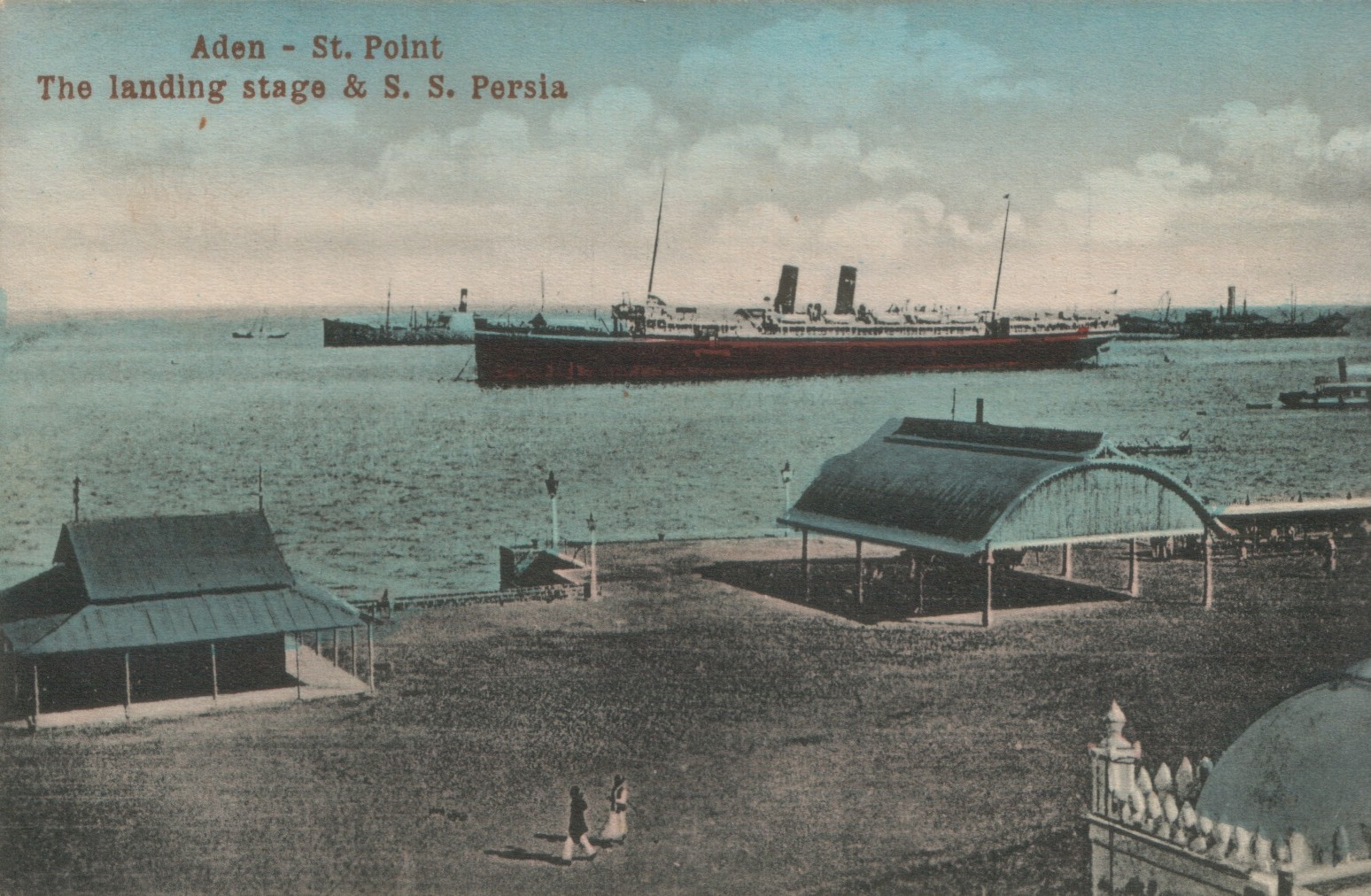
- Postcard of SS Persia at Aden, c. 1900

History

United Kingdom
- Name: SS Persia
- Owner: Peninsular & Oriental Steam Navigation Company
- Port of registry: London
- Builder: Caird & Company, Greenock
- Yard number: 295
- Launched: 13 August 1900
- Fate: Torpedoed and sunk, 30 December 1915

General characteristics
- Type: Cargo-passenger ship
- Tonnage: 7,951 GRT
- Length: 499.8 ft (152.3 m)
- Beam: 54.3 ft (16.6 m)
- Depth: 24.5 ft (7.5 m)
- Propulsion: Triple expansion steam engine
- Speed: 18 knots (33 km/h; 21 mph)

Persia was a Peninsular & Oriental Steam Navigation Company passenger liner, built in 1900 by Caird & Company, Greenock, Scotland. It was torpedoed and sunk without warning on 30 December 1915, by German U-boat U-38.

== History ==
It was 499.8 feet (152.3 m) long, with a beam of 54.3 feet (16.6 m), depth of hold of 24.5 feet (7.5 m) and a size of 7,951 gross register tons (GRT), Persia carried triple expansion steam engines capable of driving the ship at 18 knots (33 km/h; 21 mph).

Wreck location

Persia was sunk off Crete, while the passengers were having lunch, on 30 December 1915, by German World War I U-boat ace Max Valentiner (commanding SM U-38). Persia sank in five to ten minutes, killing 343 of the 519 aboard. One reason for the large number of casualties was that only four of the lifeboats were successfully launched because of the list to port. The sinking was highly controversial, as it was argued that it broke naval international law that stated that merchant ships carrying a neutral flag could be stopped and searched for contraband but not sunk unless the passengers and crew were put in a place of safety (for which lifeboats on the open sea were not sufficient). The Persia was a British ship presenting itself openly to another belligerent. The U-boat fired a torpedo and made no provision for any survivors, under Germany's policy of unrestricted submarine warfare but against the Imperial German Navy's own restriction on attacking passenger liners, the Arabic pledge.

At the time of sinking, Persia was carrying a large quantity of gold and jewels belonging to the Maharaja Jagatjit Singh, of the princely state of Kapurthala, though he himself had disembarked at Marseille. Among the passengers to survive were Colonel Charles Clive Bigham, son of Lord Mersey, 2nd Lieutenant John Lionel Miller-Hallett of the Gurkha Rifles, and John Douglas-Scott-Montagu, 2nd Baron Montagu of Beaulieu. His secretary and mistress Eleanor Thornton, who many believe was the model for the Rolls-Royce "Spirit of Ecstasy" mascot by Charles Sykes, died. Also among the dead were Robert Ney McNeely, American Consul at Aden and a former North Carolina state senator from Union County, Robert Vane Russell, Captain Harry Lawrence Ainsworth, Adjutant of the 10th Gurkha Rifles, American missionary Rev. Homer Russell Salisbury, Frank Morris Coleman, the co-owner of the media company Bennett, Coleman & Company and Mary Fernandez, an Indian travelling ayah who had made the trip several times, working on this trip for a Mrs Bird, with a last address of the Ayah’s House, in Hackney.

The survivors on the four lifeboats were picked up during the second night after the sinking by the minesweeper HMS Mallow. Only 15 of the women on board survived, among them British actress Ann Codrington (The Rossiter Case), who was pregnant with her daughter, Patricia Hilliard. Ann lost her mother, Helen Codrington.

Sixty-seven crewmen from the then Portuguese colony of Goa perished. Most of them were stewards.

The sinking was front-page news on many British newspapers, including the Daily Mirror and the Daily Sketch.

Service personnel who died on the SS Persia are recorded on the Commonwealth War Graves memorial at Shatby, Alexandria, Egypt.

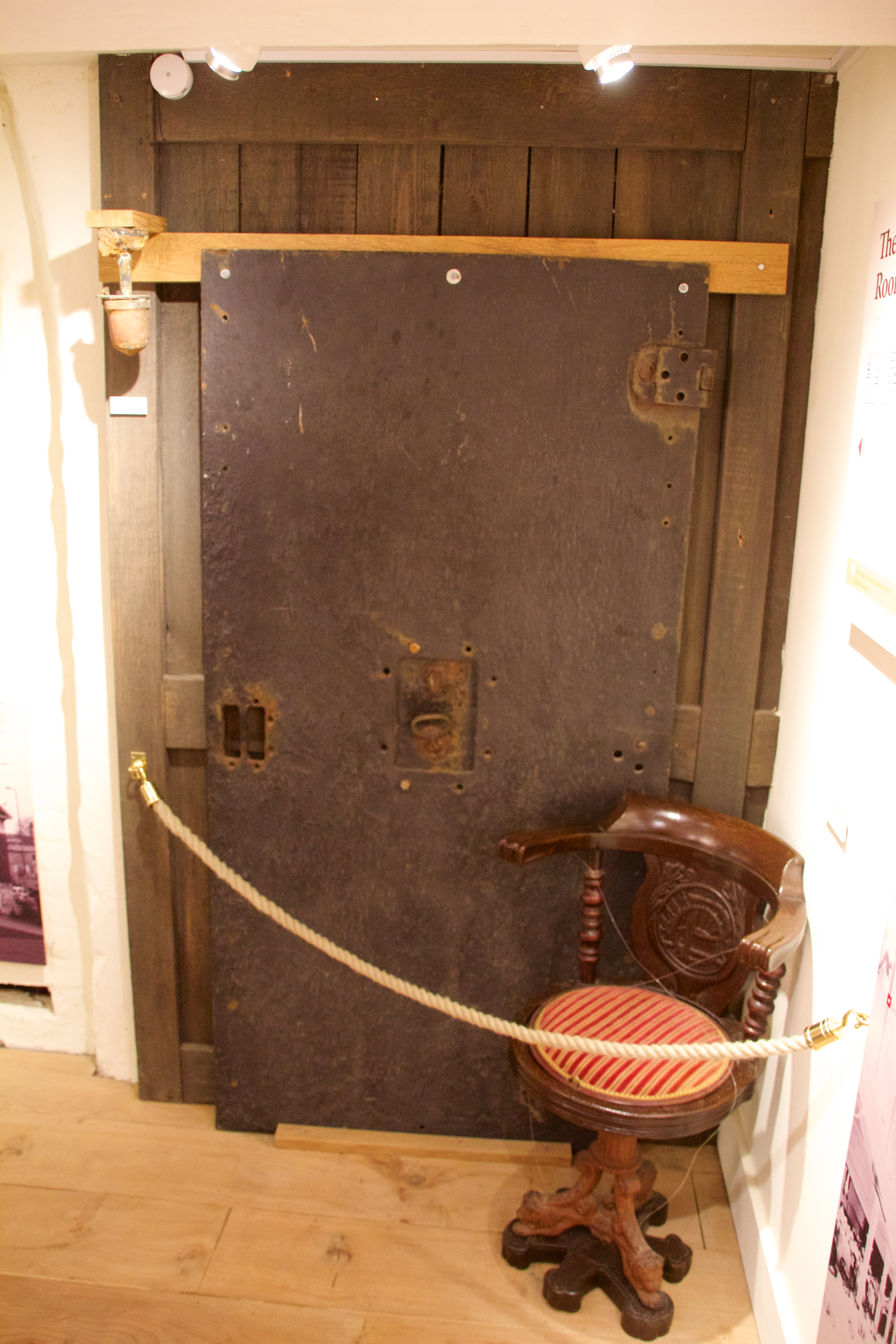
The door to the bullion room, salvaged and now located at Buckler's Hard.

The wreck of Persia was located off Crete in 2003 at a depth of 10,000 feet (3,000 m), and an attempt was made to salvage the treasure located in the bullion room. The salvage attempt met with limited success, retrieving artifacts and portions of the ship, and some jewels from the bullion room. Some of the gems have since been made into commemorative jewellery.

== See also ==
- Treasure hunting (marine)
