= General Wellesley =

General Wellesley may refer to:

- Lord Charles Wellesley (1808–1858), British Army major general
- Arthur Wellesley, 1st Duke of Wellington (1769–1852), British Army general
- Arthur Wellesley, 2nd Duke of Wellington (1807–1884), British Army lieutenant general
