= Jervoise Jervoise =

Jervoise Jervoise may refer to:

- Jervoise Clarke Jervoise (c.1743–1808), English Whig Member of Parliament (MP) for Yarmouth and Hampshire between 1768 and 1808
- Sir Jervoise Clarke-Jervoise, 2nd Baronet (1804–1889), MP for Hampshire 1857–68
