= Francis Compton (Conservative politician) =

English politician & lawyer (1824-1915)

Francis Compton DCL

Member of Parliament for South Hampshire
- In office 1880–1885 Serving with Lord Henry Douglas-Scott-Montagu (1880-1884); Sir Frederick Fitzwygram, Bt. (1884-1885)
- Preceded by: William Cowper-Temple; Lord Henry Douglas-Scott-Montagu
- Succeeded by: Constituency abolished

Member of Parliament for New Forest
- In office 1885–1892
- Preceded by: New constituency
- Succeeded by: John Douglas-Scott-Montagu

Personal details
- Born: 20 November 1824 Lyndhurst, Hampshire, England
- Died: 24 October 1915 (aged 90) Lyndhurst, Hampshire, England
- Party: Conservative
- Parents: Henry Combe Compton (father); Charlotte Mills (mother)
- Relatives: Henry Francis Compton (son); Admiral Sir Henry Codrington (brother-in-law)
- Education: Merton College, Oxford

Francis Compton D.C.L (20 November 1824 – 24 October 1915) was an English lawyer and Conservative Party politician.

== Biography ==
Compton was the son of Henry Combe Compton M.P. of Minstead Manor House, Lyndhurst, Hampshire and his wife Charlotte Mills. He was educated at Merton College, Oxford and became a Fellow of All Souls. He was called to the bar at Lincoln's Inn and Middle Temple in 1850. He was a J.P. for Hampshire.

At the 1880 general election Compton was elected as Member of Parliament (MP) for South Hampshire. When this was divided under the Redistribution of Seats Act 1885, he was elected at the 1885 general election as MP for the New Forest, and held the seat until he retired from the House of Commons at the 1892 election.

Compton lived at Manor House, Minstead, Lyndhurst and died at the age of 90. His son Henry Francis Compton was later MP for New Forest. His sister Catherine married Admiral Sir Henry Codrington.

== Cricket ==
Compton played first-class cricket for Hampshire as well as for the Marylebone Cricket Club and the Gentlemen of the South.

Parliament of the United Kingdom
Preceded by William Cowper-Temple; Lord Henry Douglas-Scott-Montagu	Member of Parliament for South Hampshire; 1880 – 1885; With: Lord Henry Douglas-Scott-Montagu to 1884; Sir Frederick Fitzwygram, Bt. from 1884	Constituency abolished
New constituency	Member of Parliament for New Forest; 1885 – 1892	Succeeded by John Douglas-Scott-Montagu
