= William Cholmondeley, 3rd Marquess of Cholmondeley =

British politician

The Most Honourable The Marquess of Cholmondeley
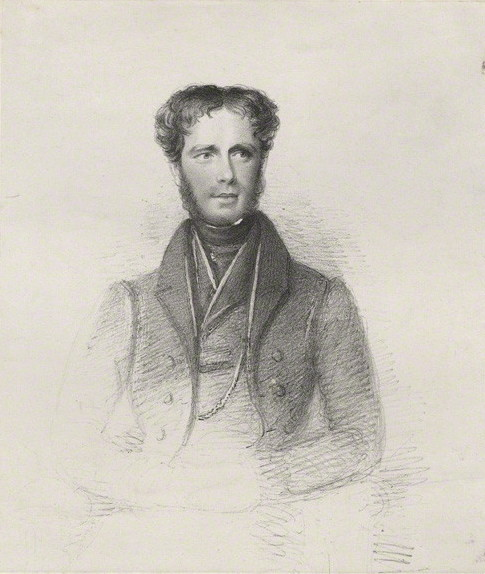
- Lord Cholmondeley in 1832

Personal details
- Born: William Henry Hugh Cholmondeley; 31 March 1800
- Died: 16 December 1884 (aged 84) Houghton Hall, Norfolk, England
- Citizenship: British
- Party: Conservative
- Spouse: Marcia Arbuthnot (m. 1825; died 1878)
- Children: 8
- Parent(s): George Cholmondeley, 1st Marquess of Cholmondeley; Lady Georgiana Charlotte Bertie
- Education: Eton College
- Occupation: Politician and peer

William Henry Hugh Cholmondeley, 3rd Marquess of Cholmondeley (/ˈtʃʌmli/ CHUM-lee; 31 March 1800 – 16 December 1884), styled Lord Henry Cholmondeley from 1815 until 1870, was a British peer and Conservative Member of Parliament.

== Family and education ==
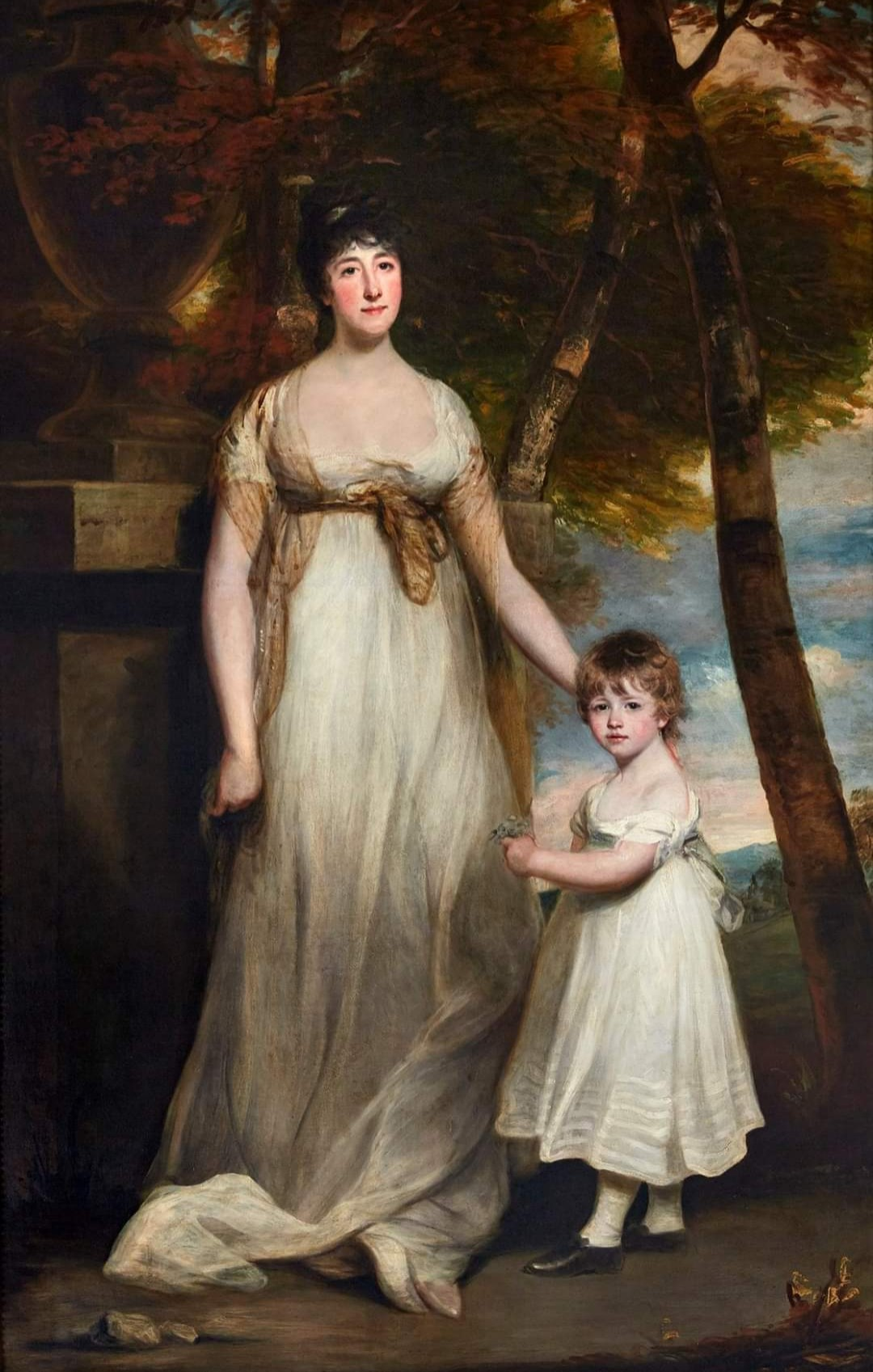
Lady Cholmondeley and her son William Henry Hugh Cholmondeley, 3rd Marquess of Cholmondeley (1805), by Charles Turner

Cholmondeley was the younger of two sons born to George, Fourth Earl of Cholmondeley, who was created the first Marquess of Cholmondeley in 1815. His mother was Lady Georgiana Charlotte, second daughter and co-heir of Peregrine Bertie, 3rd Duke of Ancaster and Kesteven. He was a direct descendant of Sir Robert Walpole, the first Prime Minister of Great Britain.

Like his grandfather, and his elder brother, Cholmondeley was educated at Eton. He then attended Christ Church, Oxford, but apparently left without a degree, as was relatively common among his generation. Cholmondeley's elder brother, George, succeeded to his father's title in 1827 as the 2nd Marquess of Cholmondeley.

== Career ==
In 1822, Cholmondeley was elected to the House of Commons for Castle Rising, a seat he held until 1832, when the constituency was abolished by the Reform Bill. He remained out of Parliament for the next twenty years. In 1852, Cholmondeley was again successful for South Hampshire, representing it for the next five years until 1857.

Cholmondeley was a member of the Canterbury Association from 27 March 1848.

In 1870, Cholmondeley succeeded to his elder brother's title as the third Marquess of Cholmondeley and entered the House of Lords.

== Marriage and issue ==
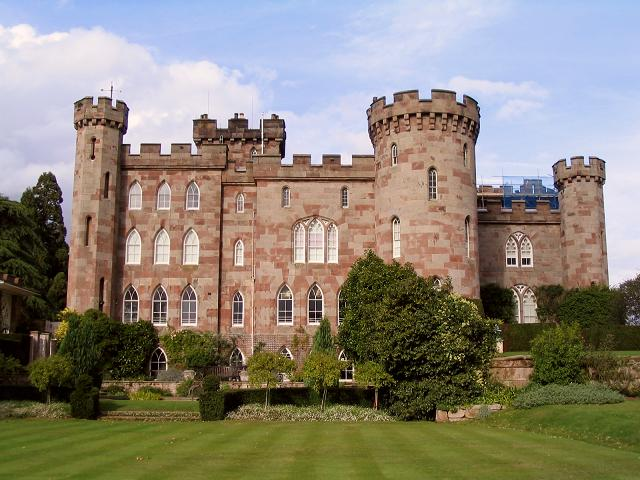
Cholmondeley Castle, Cheshire

On 28 February 1825, Cholmondeley married his first cousin once-removed, Marcia Emma Georgiana Arbuthnot, daughter of Charles Arbuthnot, and Marcia Arbuthnot at Cholmondeley House, which was then in Piccadilly, London. She was the granddaughter of Hester Lisle, lady-in-waiting to Queen Caroline, and a famous witness at the 1806 trial proceedings of Queen Caroline's alleged adultery. The very same Hester Lisle was the daughter of George Cholmondeley, Viscount Malpas and thus paternal aunt of the 3rd Marquess. They had eight children, of whom only two daughters survived him:

- Marcia Charlotte Emma Cholmondeley (22 November 1826 – 7 April 1828)
- Lady Charlotte Georgiana Cholmondeley (4 February 1828 – 17 August 1912)
- Charles George Cholmondeley (9 July 1829 – 7 December 1869)
- Lady Marcia Susan Harriet Cholmondeley (18 April 1831 – 10 June 1927)
- Lord Henry Vere Cholmondeley (4 October 1834 – 25 February 1882)
- Emma Caroline Cholmondeley (11 November 1837 – 26 January 1839)
- Caroline Rachel Cholmondeley (4 July 1840 – 11 March 1863)

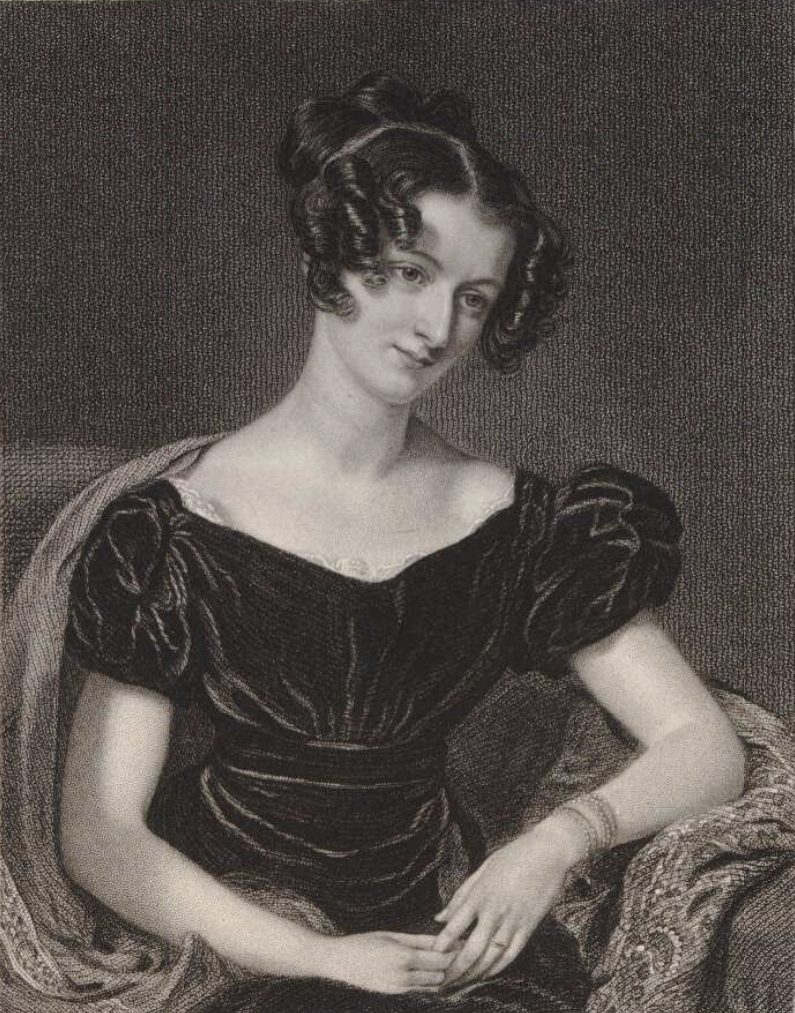
Marcia, Marchioness of Cholmondeley, 1829 engraving

== Lands and estates ==
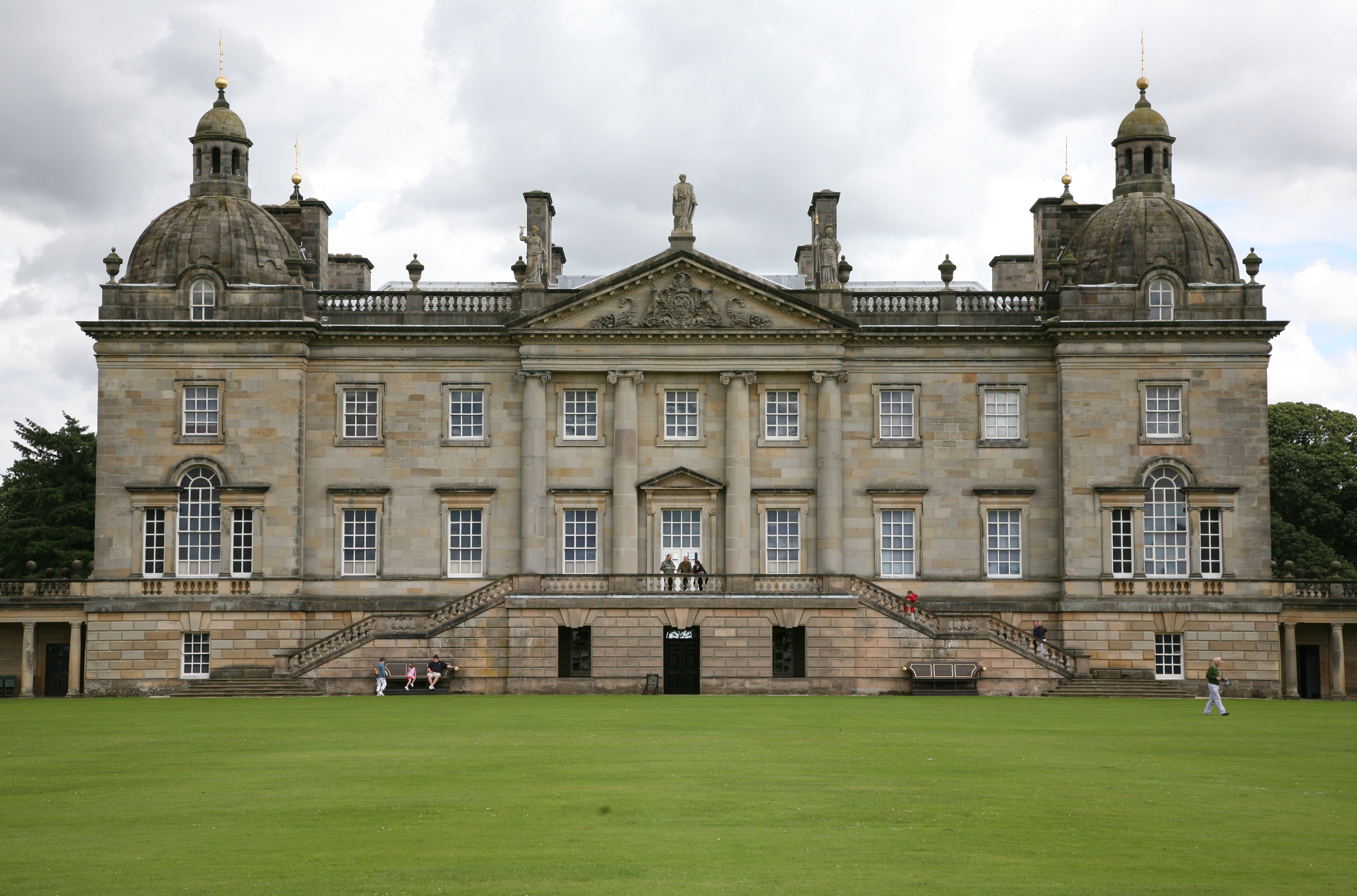
Houghton Hall, ancestral home of the Marquess of Cholmondeley since the establishment of the title in 1815, has now opened some of its rooms and grounds to the public.

The family seats are Houghton Hall, Norfolk, and Cholmondeley Castle, which is surrounded by a 7,500 acres (30 km^{2}) estate near Malpas, Cheshire.

The Marquess was a teetotal Quaker and closed all the alehouses on the estate.

He owned almost 34,000 acres in Cheshire and Norfolk.

== Position at court ==
One moiety part of the ancient office of Lord Great Chamberlain is a Cholmondeley inheritance. This hereditary honour came into the Cholmondeley family through the marriage of the first Marquess of Cholmondeley to Lady Georgiana Charlotte Bertie, daughter of Peregrine Bertie, 3rd Duke of Ancaster and Kesteven. The second, fourth, fifth, sixth and seventh holders of the marquessate have all held this office, but Lord William did not take on the responsibilities of this court function.

== Death and succession ==
Cholmondeley's wife died in 1878. Six years after her death, he himself died at Houghton Hall, aged 84. As both of his sons had died before him, Cholmondeley was succeeded in his titles by his grandson George, Earl of Rocksavage, who was the eldest son of his eldest son, Charles.

Houghton Hall was leased out after his death in 1884 until 1916, after which it was restored by the 5th Viscount. Cholmondeley Castle was occupied by the 4th Marquess, who was fatally injured there.

Parliament of the United Kingdom
Preceded by Earl of Rocksavage; Fulk Greville Howard	Member of Parliament for Castle Rising; 1822–1832; With: Fulk Greville Howard	Constituency abolished
Preceded by Lord Charles Wellesley; Henry Combe Compton	Member of Parliament for South Hampshire; 1852–1857; With: Henry Combe Compton	Succeeded by Sir Jervoise Clarke-Jervoise; Ralph Heneage Dutton
Peerage of the United Kingdom
Preceded by George Horatio Cholmondeley	Marquess of Cholmondeley; 1870–1884	Succeeded by George Henry Hugh Cholmondeley
