= SS R. Ney McNeely =

World War II Liberty ship of the United States

History

United States
- Name: R. Ney McNeely
- Namesake: R. Ney McNeely
- Ordered: as type (EC2-S-C1) hull, MC hull 1513
- Builder: J.A. Jones Construction, Brunswick, Georgia
- Cost: $1,242,218
- Yard number: 129
- Way number: 1
- Laid down: 9 December 1943
- Launched: 29 January 1944
- Sponsored by: Miss Lanelle Rimes
- Completed: 10 February 1944
- Identification: Call Signal: KVOJ
- Fate: Laid up in National Defense Reserve Fleet, James River Group, Lee Hall, Virginia, 27 May 1948; Transferred to US Navy, 28 February 1955

United States
- Name: R. Ney McNeely
- Acquired: 28 February 1955
- Refit: Converted to Auxiliary Minesweeper
- Fate: Laid up in National Defense Reserve Fleet, Wilmington, North Carolina, 16 September 1955; Laid up in National Defense Reserve Fleet, James River Group, Lee Hall, Virginia, 12 March 1965; Sold for scrapping, 9 June 1972

General characteristics
- Class & type: Liberty ship; type EC2-S-C1, standard
- Tonnage: 10,865 LT DWT; 7,176 GRT
- Displacement: 3,380 long tons (3,434 t) (light); 14,245 long tons (14,474 t) (max)
- Length: 441 feet 6 inches (135 m) oa; 416 feet (127 m) pp; 427 feet (130 m) lwl
- Beam: 57 feet (17 m)
- Draft: 27 ft 9.25 in (8.4646 m)
- Installed power: 2 × Oil fired 450 °F (232 °C) boilers, operating at 220 psi (1,500 kPa); 2,500 hp (1,900 kW)
- Propulsion: 1 × triple-expansion steam engine, (manufactured by Filer and Stowell, Milwaukee, Wisconsin); 1 × screw propeller
- Speed: 11.5 knots (21.3 km/h; 13.2 mph)
- Capacity: 562,608 cubic feet (15,931 m^{3}) (grain); 499,573 cubic feet (14,146 m^{3}) (bale)
- Complement: 38–62 USMM; 21–40 USNAG
- Armament: Varied by ship; Bow-mounted 3-inch (76 mm)/50-caliber gun; Stern-mounted 4-inch (102 mm)/50-caliber gun; 2–8 × single 20-millimeter (0.79 in) Oerlikon anti-aircraft (AA) cannons and/or, 2–8 × 37-millimeter (1.46 in) M1 AA guns

SS R. Ney McNeely was a Liberty ship built in the United States during World War II. She was named after R. Ney McNeely, a State Representative in North Carolina, a member of the North Carolina Senate, a later the American Consul in Aden.

== Construction ==
R. Ney McNeely was laid down on 9 December 1943, under a Maritime Commission (MARCOM) contract, MC hull 1513, by J.A. Jones Construction, Brunswick, Georgia; she was sponsored by Miss Lanelle Rimes, the winner of a contest sponsored by the shipyard to gather scrap metal to help the war effort, and launched on 29 January 1944.

== History ==
She was allocated to the South Atlantic Steamship Co., on 10 February 1944. On 27 May 1948, she was laid up in the National Defense Reserve Fleet in Wilmington, North Carolina.

=== Conversion to minesweeper ===
She was transferred to the US Navy and withdrawn from the Reserve Fleet on 28 February 1955, to be converted to a Type EC2-S-22a Auxiliary Minesweeper (YAG). After her conversion, which included the installation of remote control propulsion equipment, 1,000 US gal/min (3.8 m^{3}/min) diesel ballast pumps, and the addition of 190 long tons (193 t) of rock ballast to holds 2,3,4, and 5, she was returned to the Wilmington fleet on 16 September 1955, and no YAG hull number was assigned.

== Disposal ==
On 12 March 1965, she was transferred to the National Defense Reserve Fleet, James River Group, Lee Hall, Virginia. On 9 June 1972, she was sold to the Union Minerals & Alloy Corp., for $35,212.54, to be scrapped. She was Withdrawn from the fleet on 14 August 1972.

== Bibliography ==
- "Jones Construction, Brunswick GA". www.ShipbuildingHistory.com. 13 October 2010.
- "Liberty Ships – World War II".
- Maritime Administration. "R. Ney McNeely". Ship History Database Vessel Status Card. U.S. Department of Transportation, Maritime Administration.
- Davies, James (May 2004). "Specifications (As-Built)" (PDF). p. 23.
- "SS R. Ney McNeely".
