= John Willis Fleming =

British politician

Willis's Name Act 1813
- Act of Parliament
- Parliament of the United Kingdom
- Long title: An Act to enable John Fleming Barton Willis Esquire, and his Issue, to take the Name of Fleming, and bear the Arms of the Fleming Family, pursuant to the Will of John Fleming Esquire, deceased.
- Citation: 53 Geo. 3. c. 78 Pr.

Dates
- Royal assent: 7 July 1813

John Willis Fleming (28 November 1781 – 4 September 1844) was an English landed proprietor and Conservative Member of Parliament.

He was born at Bletchley in Buckinghamshire, the son of Rev. Thomas Willis and Catherine Hyde. He was educated at Eton College. He was the great-grandson of the antiquary Browne Willis, and of Benedict Calvert, 4th Baron Baltimore and Charlotte Lee, Lady Baltimore.

He was commissioned as a Captain in the South Hampshire Militia in 1803, became Lieutenant-Colonel in 1808, and resigned in 1813.

He changed his name by a private act of Parliament, Willis's Name Act 1813 (53 Geo. 3. c. 78 Pr.) from John Fleming Barton Willis to John Fleming, and he was also known thereafter as John Willis Fleming. In 1813 he married Christopheria Buchanan, by whom he had four sons and four daughters. He was High Sheriff of Hampshire in 1817. He was elected Member of Parliament for Hampshire in 1820, and again in 1826 and 1830; and jointly with Henry Combe Compton for South Hampshire in 1835, 1837, and 1841.

John Willis Fleming died at Athens, Greece on 18 July 1844, and was buried at St. Nicolas' Church, North Stoneham in Hampshire, near his seat Stoneham Park. The memorial tablet in St. Nicolas was carved by Richard Cockle Lucas of Chilworth.

Parliament of the United Kingdom
Preceded by Thomas Freeman-Heathcote; William John Chute	Member of Parliament for Hampshire; 1820–1831; With: George Purefoy-Jervoise 1820–26; Sir William Heathcote, Bt 1826–31	Succeeded by Charles Shaw-Lefevre; Sir James Macdonald, Bt
Preceded by Viscount Palmerston; Sir George Staunton, Bt	Member of Parliament for South Hampshire; 1835–1842; With: Henry Combe Compton	Succeeded by Lord Charles Wellesley; Henry Combe Compton
