= Spirit of Ecstasy =

Bonnet ornament on Rolls-Royce cars

Spirit of Ecstasy on a vehicle

The Spirit of Ecstasy is the hood ornament of the Rolls-Royce cars. It is in the form of a woman leaning forwards with her arms outstretched behind and above her. Billowing cloth runs from her arms to her back, resembling wings.

== History ==
=== The Whisper, precursor to the Spirit of Ecstasy ===
The first Rolls-Royce motorcars did not feature radiator mascots; they simply carried the Rolls-Royce emblem. When John, 2nd Baron Montagu of Beaulieu commissioned his friend, sculptor Charles Robinson Sykes, who worked in London under the nobleman's patronage, to sculpt a personal mascot for the bonnet/hood of his 1909 Rolls-Royce Silver Ghost, Sykes chose Eleanor Velasco Thornton as his model. Sykes originally crafted a figurine of her in fluttering robes, having placed one forefinger against her lips – to symbolize the secret of the love affair between Thornton and Montagu. The figurine was consequently named The Whisper and is on display at the National Motor Museum in Beaulieu along with other Spirit of Ecstasy figurines.

Only three or four castings were ever made, and only two are believed to have survived.

=== Modern ornament ===
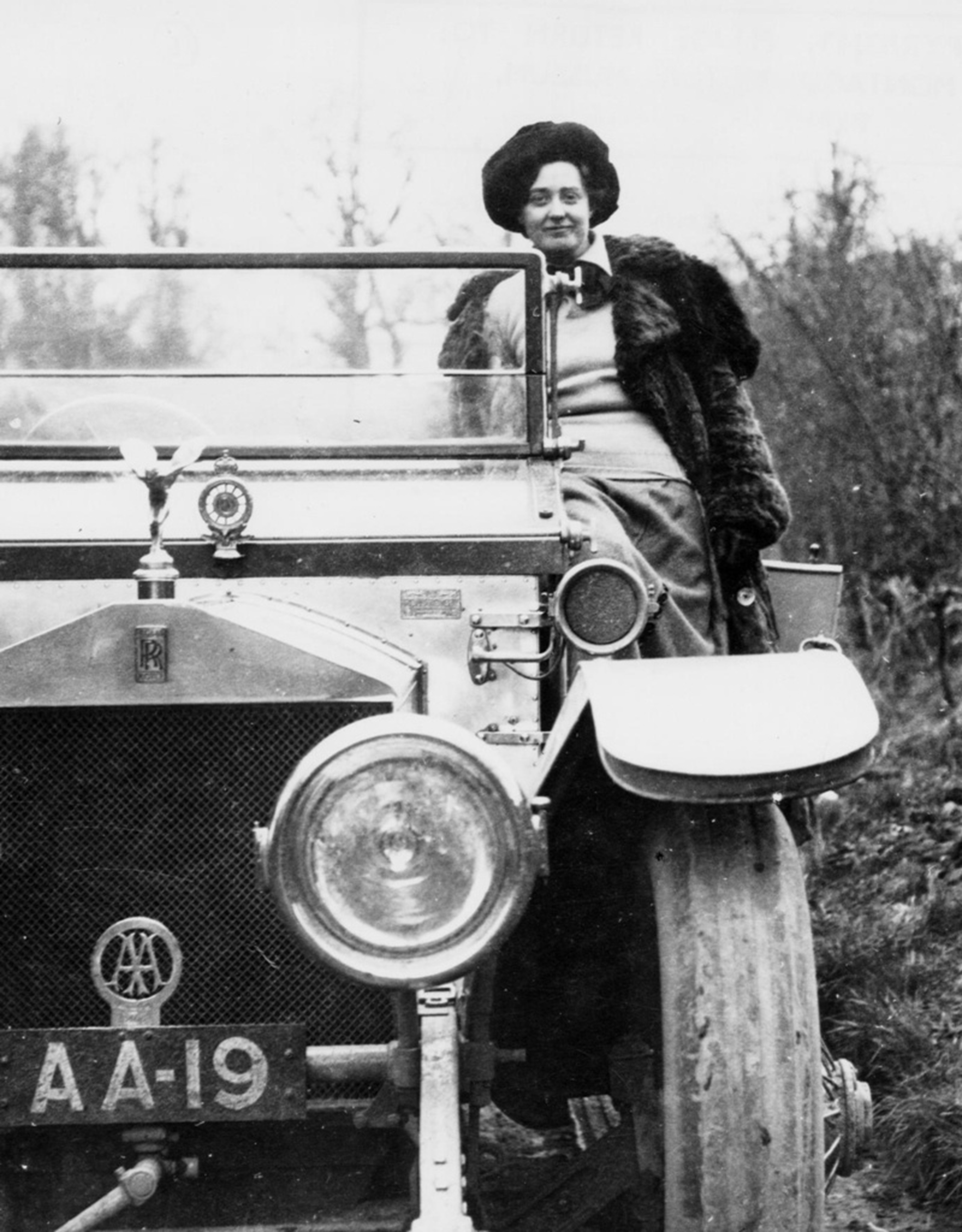
Eleanor Velasco Thornton posing next to Montagu's Silver Ghost, c. 1911. On the hood is seen the Spirit of Ecstasy.

The Spirit of Ecstasy, also called Eleanor, Silver Lady, or Flying Lady, was designed by Sykes, a graduate of London's Royal College of Art, and carries with it a story about secret passion between Montagu, second Baron Montagu of Beaulieu after 1905, a pioneer of the automobile movement, and editor of The Car Illustrated magazine from 1902, and the model for the emblem, Eleanor Velasco Thornton.

Eleanor (also known as Thorn) was the secretary of John Walter, who fell in love with her in 1902 when she worked for him on the aforesaid motoring magazine. Their secret love was to remain hidden, limited to their circle of friends, for more than a decade. The reason for the secrecy was Eleanor's impoverished social and economic status, which was an obstacle to their love. On the other hand, Montagu had been married to Lady Cecil Victoria Constance Kerr since 1889.

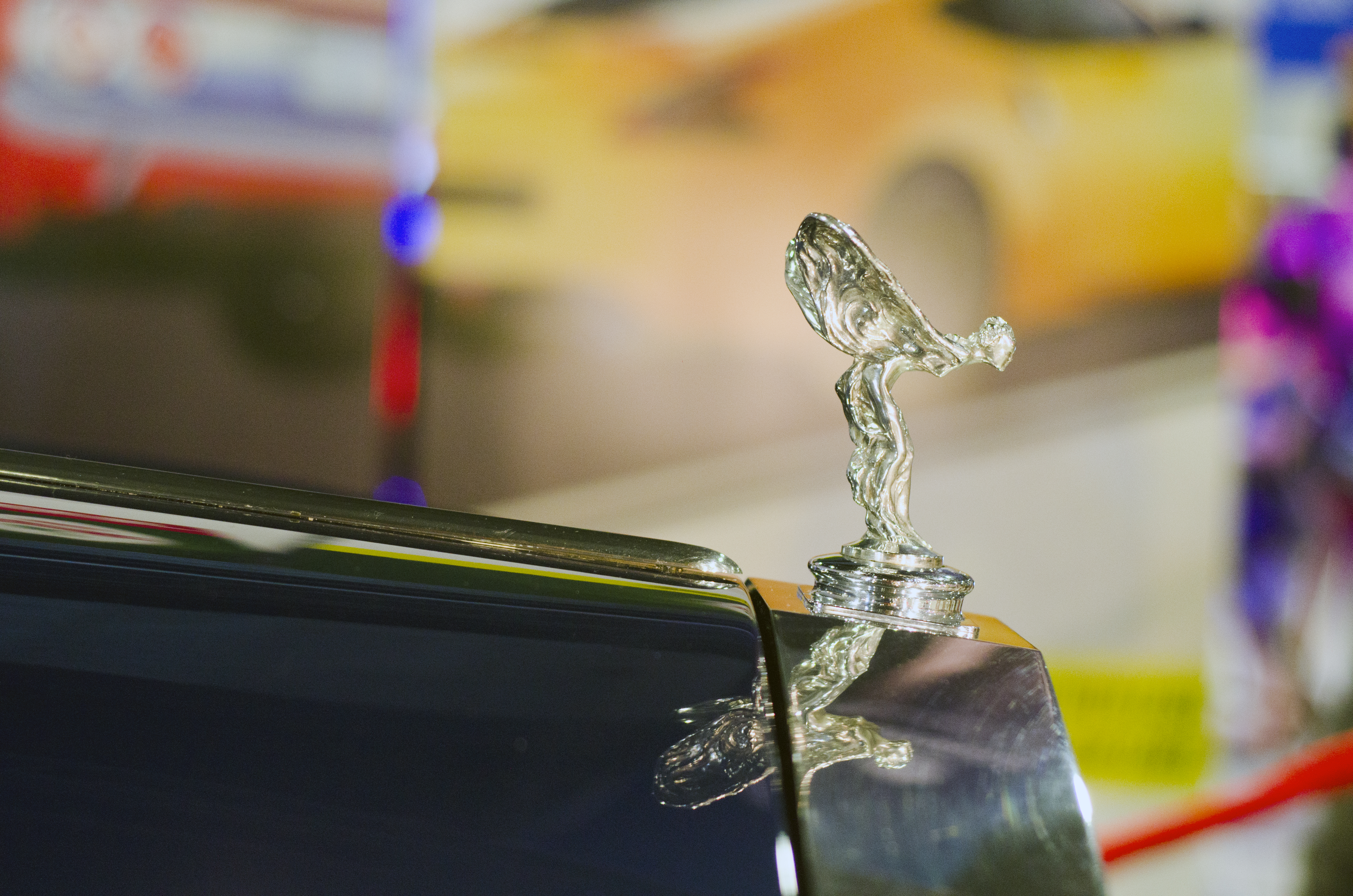
Side view of The Spirit of Ecstasy (1972 Rolls-Royce Silver Shadow)

By 1910 personal mascots had become the fashion of the day. Rolls-Royce were concerned to note that some owners were affixing "inappropriate" ornaments to their cars. Claude Johnson, then managing director of Rolls-Royce Motor Cars, was asked to commission a more dignified and graceful mascot.

He turned to Sykes to produce a mascot which would adorn all future Rolls-Royce cars and become generic to the marque, with the specifications that it should convey "the spirit of the Rolls-Royce, namely, speed with silence, absence of vibration, the mysterious harnessing of great energy and a beautiful living organism of superb grace..."

Sykes' brief from Claude Johnson had been to evoke the spirit of mythical beauty, Nike, whose graceful image was admired in The Louvre, but Sykes was not impressed. He felt that a more feminine representation might be apt.

It was again Miss Thornton whom he had in mind. Sykes chose to modify The Whisper into a version similar to today's Spirit of Ecstasy. He called this first model The Spirit of Speed. Later, Charles Sykes called it "A graceful little goddess, the Spirit of Ecstasy, who has selected road travel as her supreme delight and alighted on the prow of a Rolls-Royce motor car to revel in the freshness of the air and the musical sound of her fluttering draperies."

Claude Johnson devised the description of the Spirit of Ecstasy, he described how Sykes had sought to convey the image of "the spirit of ecstasy, who has selected road travel as her supreme delight...... she is expressing her keen enjoyment, with her arms outstretched and her sight fixed upon the distance."

Royce was ill during the commissioning of the flying lady. He did not believe the figurine enhanced the cars, asserting that it impaired the driver's view, and was rarely seen driving one of his company's vehicles adorned with the mascot.

In February 1911 Sykes presented to Rolls-Royce the Spirit of Ecstasy, which was easily recognisable as being a variation on the theme of The Whisper. The similarity was hardly coincidental because the model for both had been Miss Thornton. The sculptor's signature appeared on the plinth and were either signed "Charles Sykes, February 1911" or "Feb 6, 1911" or "6.2.11". Even after Rolls-Royce took over the casting of the figures in 1948 each Spirit of Ecstasy continued to receive this inscription until 1951.

The Spirit of Ecstasy was also manufactured by the British firm Louis Lejeune Ltd. for a number of years.

Eleanor died on 30 December 1915 when the SS Persia was torpedoed by a U-boat south of Crete. She had been accompanying Lord Montagu who had been directed to assume a command in India. He was thought to have been killed too, but survived and was saved after several days adrift in a life raft.

== Alterations ==
Rolls-Royce ensured it was listed as an optional extra, but in practice it was fitted to almost all cars after that year, becoming a standard fitting in the early 1920s. It was silver plated from 1911 until 1914 when the mascot was made with nickel or chrome alloy to dissuade theft. The only departure from this came in Paris at the competition for the most apposite mascot of 1920, where a gold-plated version won first place. Gold-plated versions were subsequently available at additional cost. The design of the mascot has had eleven main variations in its life. Lowered height of coachwork forced subsequent reductions in the mascot size. Consequently, several alterations in the original design were made.

=== Kneeling version (1934–1939 and 1946–1956) ===
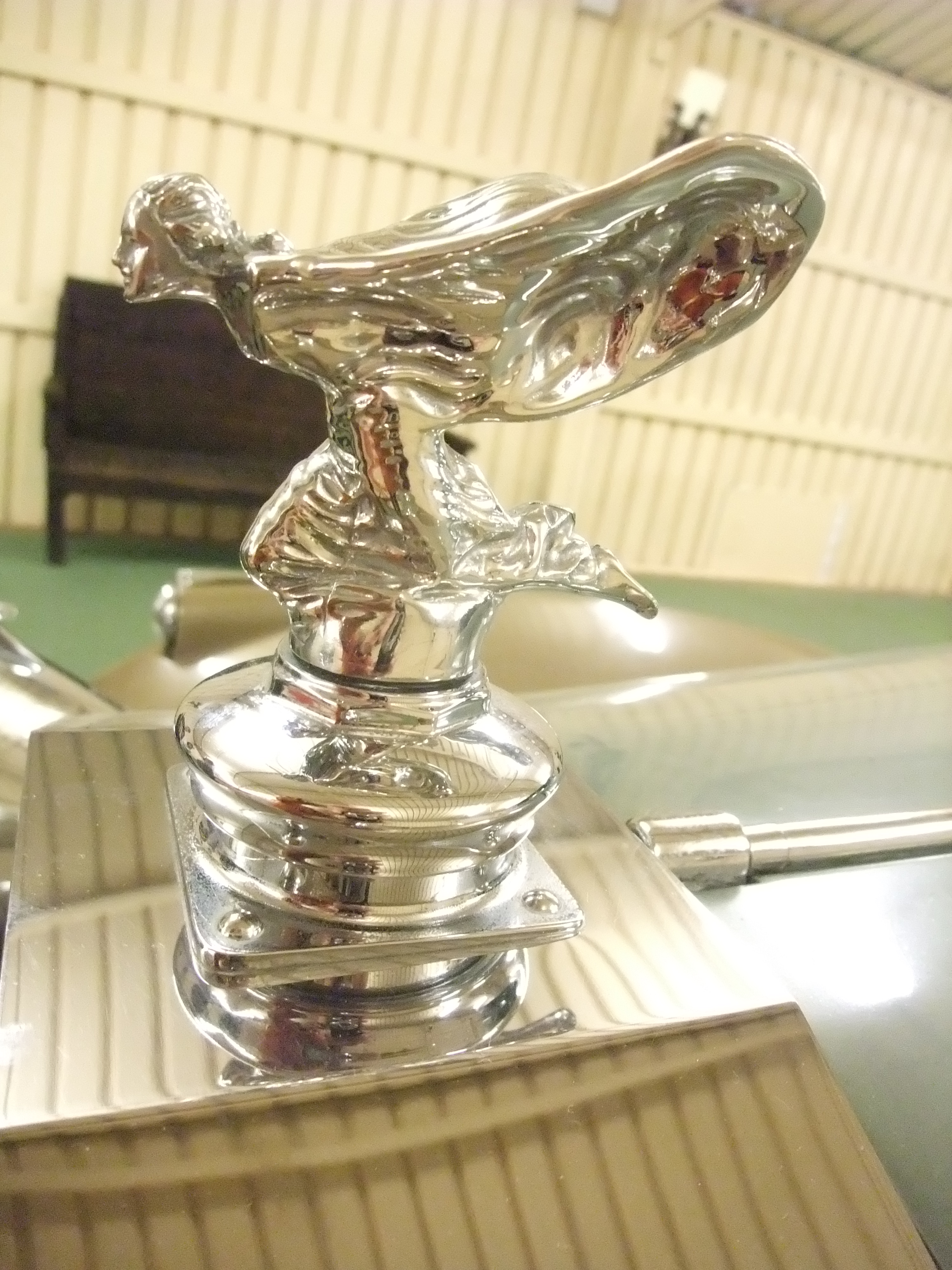
Kneeling version of the Spirit of Ecstasy on a Phantom IV radiator

Sykes was again commissioned by Rolls-Royce in the 1930s to make a lower version of the mascot to suit the needs of the new sports saloons by providing their drivers with a clearer view of the road ahead.

The kneeling lady mascot was unveiled on 26 January 1934 and was a reflection of Eleanor as it was a symbol of the Rolls-Royce. It also had on the plinth the inscription "C. Sykes, 26.1.34", the date when the first piece was finished. This version was, however, discontinued after the Silver Dawn, Phantom IV and Silver Wraith models, in favour of a smaller version of the original standing mascot, and so it remains to date. The last Phantom IV delivered and the final production years of the Silver Wraith carried this standing version.

=== 2003–present ===
Today's Spirit of Ecstasy, from the 2003 Phantom model onward, stands at 3 inches (7.6 cm) and, for the safety of any person being accidentally hit, is mounted on a spring-loaded mechanism designed to retract instantly into the radiator shell if struck from any direction. There is a button within the vehicle which can raise or lower the emblem when pressed. She can also automatically raise or lower when the vehicle is locked and unlocked. She can be made from highly polished stainless steel, stainless with 24-carat gold plating, or from illuminated frosted crystal – the latter two being optional extras. Aftermarket customized versions are also available, including those covered in a matte black paint or studded in diamonds. The company created one as a Fabergé Egg.

=== Spectre redesign ===
A new design was specially made for the all-new-electric Spectre, 111 years after it was first registered as intellectual property in 1911. The figurine has been remodelled with a lower, more dynamic stance that brings her much closer to the original drawings made in the early years of the 20th century. The new design for the Spectre will appear on all future models.

111 years ago today, the Spirit of Ecstasy became an official part of Rolls-Royce. Yet, she has come to represent a spiritual direction for our brand. Her form perfectly captures the marque – she leans forward, expressing our relentless pursuit of progress, and her dress gracefully flows in the wind, echoing the serenity of our products in motion. For Spectre and beyond, she becomes lower and more focussed; braced for unprecedented speed and the exciting future her presence will define. — Anders Warming, Director of Design

The new Spirit of Ecstasy is 82.7 mm tall, compared to the previous height of 100 mm. Her robes have been subtly reshaped to make them more aerodynamic and realistic.

The Spirit of Ecstasy is the most famous and desirable automotive mascot in the world. More than just a symbol, she is the embodiment of our brand, and a constant source of inspiration and pride for the marque and its clients. Like our brand, she has always moved with the times while staying true to her nature and character. In her new form she is more streamlined and graceful than ever before – the perfect emblem for the most aerodynamic Rolls-Royce ever created, and for gracing the prow of our bold electric future. — Torsten Müller-Ötvös, Chief Executive Officer (CEO)

The figurine is now posed as if braced for the wind, with one leg forward, body tucked low, and eyes focused ahead. She has, previously, stood with her feet together, legs straight and tilting at the waist. Her new shape was digitally sculpted.
