= William Cowper-Temple, 1st Baron Mount Temple =

British politician

The Right Honourable The Lord Mount Temple PC
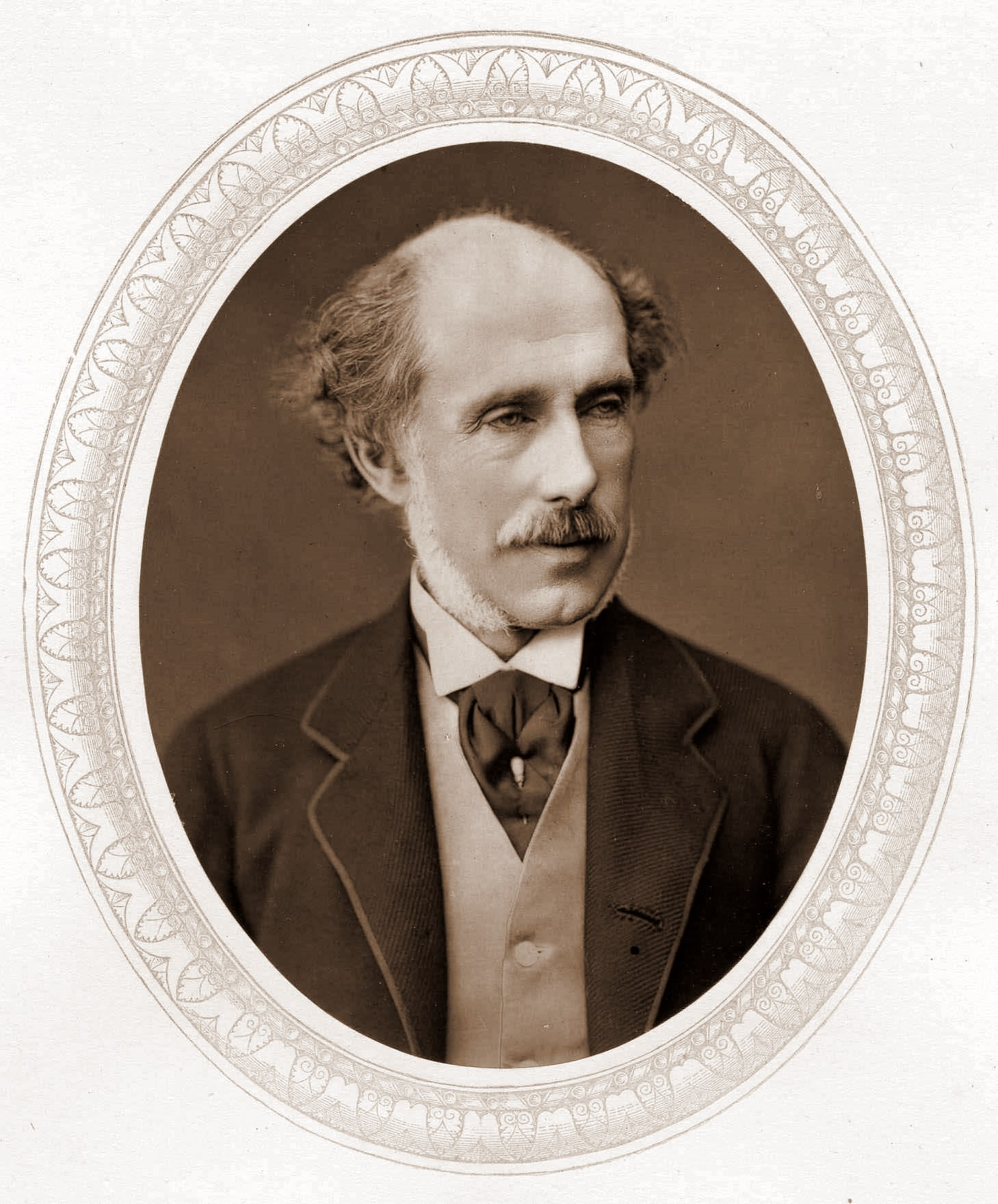

President of the Board of Health
- In office 13 August 1855 – 9 February 1857
- Monarch: Victoria
- Prime Minister: The Viscount Palmerston
- Preceded by: Sir Benjamin Hall, Bt
- Succeeded by: William Monsell
- In office 24 September 1857 – 21 February 1858
- Monarch: Victoria
- Prime Minister: The Viscount Palmerston
- Preceded by: William Monsell
- Succeeded by: Charles Adderley

Paymaster General and Vice-President of the Board of Trade
- In office 12 August 1859 – 9 February 1860
- Monarch: Victoria
- Prime Minister: The Viscount Palmerston
- Preceded by: James Wilson
- Succeeded by: William Hutt

First Commissioner of Works
- In office 9 February 1860 – 26 June 1866
- Monarch: Victoria
- Prime Minister: The Viscount Palmerston; The Earl Russell
- Preceded by: Hon. Henry FitzRoy
- Succeeded by: Lord John Manners

Personal details
- Born: 13 December 1811 Brocket Hall, Hertfordshire
- Died: 16 October 1888 (aged 76) Broadlands, Hampshire
- Party: Liberal
- Spouse(s): (1) Harriet Gurney (d. 1843) (2) Georgina Tollemache (d. 1901)
- Parent(s): Peter Cowper, 5th Earl Cowper; Emily Lamb

William Francis Cowper-Temple, 1st Baron Mount Temple, PC (13 December 1811 – 16 October 1888), known as William Cowper (pronounced "Cooper") before 1869 and as William Cowper-Temple between 1869 and 1880, was a British Liberal statesman.

== Background and education ==
Born at Brocket Hall, Hertfordshire, Cowper was the second son of Peter Cowper, 5th Earl Cowper, and the Hon. Emily Lamb (though since his mother had several lovers there is some doubt about his true paternity). He was the younger brother of George Cowper, 6th Earl Cowper and nephew of Prime Minister Lord Melbourne. His father died in 1837 and in 1839 his mother married future prime minister, Lord Palmerston, who became Cowper's stepfather. He was educated at Eton. After entering the Royal Horse Guards in 1830, he was promoted Captain five years later, eventually attaining the rank of brevet Major in 1852.

== Political career ==
In 1835, Cowper was elected Liberal Member of Parliament for Hertford, a seat he held for the next thirty-three years, and became private secretary to his uncle Prime Minister Lord Melbourne. He was appointed a Groom in Waiting in 1837, and in 1841 served for three months as a Lord of the Treasury under Melbourne, only resuming office five years later as a Lord of the Admiralty when the Whigs returned to power under Lord John Russell. He again held this post under Lord Aberdeen from 1852 to 1855, and in the latter year was made Under-Secretary of State for the Home Department by his stepfather Lord Palmerston when he became prime minister. In August that same year he was appointed President of the Board of Health, and sworn of the Privy Council. Four years later he became Vice-President of the Board of Trade and Paymaster General, only serving for a year before Palmerston appointed him First Commissioner of Works.

In 1866, on the fall of Lord Russell's government, Cowper left office for good. Two years later he was returned to Parliament for Hampshire South, and held this seat until 1880.

Cowper-Temple was involved in the Elementary Education Act 1870 which set up Board Schools (state primary schools, run by elected local school boards) throughout England. He was responsible for the Cowper-Temple clause, an amendment which became section 14 of the act. In order to overcome the concerns of Nonconformists that their children might be taught Anglican doctrine, the clause proposed that religious teaching in the new state schools be non-denominational, which in practice meant learning the Bible and a few hymns. Section 7 of the act also gave parents the right to withdraw their children from any religious instruction provided in board schools, and to withdraw their children at that or other times to attend any other religious instruction of their choice.

When his mother died in 1869, he inherited a number of estates under his stepfather's will, and so took that year under Royal licence the additional surname of Temple. The properties included a 10,000-acre estate on Sligo's Mullaghmore peninsula with its unfinished Classiebawn Castle, commissioned by his stepfather, which he completed by 1874. In 1880 he was raised to the peerage as Baron Mount Temple, of Mount Temple in the County of Sligo. This was a revival of the junior title held by the Viscounts Palmerston, which had become extinct along with the viscountcy on his stepfather's death in 1865.

Apart from his political career Lord Mount Temple organized ecumenical conferences at Broadlands. One of the regular speakers there was George MacDonald.

== Personal life ==
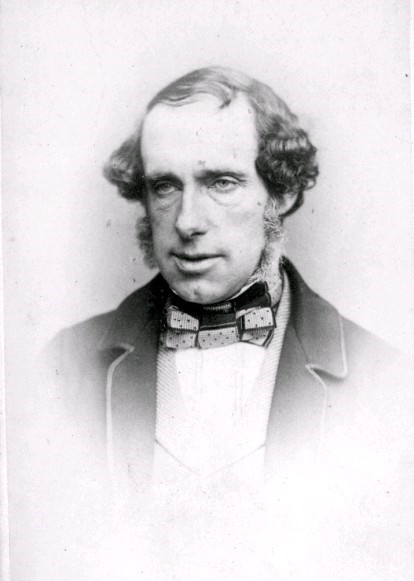
William Cowper-Temple during the second half of the 19th century.

Lord Mount Temple was twice married. He married first Harriet Alicia, daughter of Daniel Gurney, in 1843. After her early death the same year, he married second, in 1848, Georgina Tollemache, daughter of Admiral John Richard Delap Tollemache, and a sister of the 1st Baron Tollemache. Both marriages were childless. He died on 16 October 1888, aged 76, at his home of Broadlands, Hampshire, and was buried at nearby Romsey. His peerage became extinct on his death. Lady Mount Temple died in October 1901, aged 79.

His estates (excluding Shelley House, Chelsea, lived in and inherited by his wife) had already passed to or were inherited by his nephew, the Rt. Hon. Evelyn Ashley, the second son of Anthony Ashley-Cooper, 7th Earl of Shaftesbury. His probate was sworn the next year at £76,123 (equivalent to about £8,600,000 in 2025); and his wife's in 1903 at £8863.

== Legacy ==
The Canadian Pacific passenger SS Mount Temple, launched in 1901, was named for him. The British rock band The Cooper Temple Clause were also named after him.

== Books used for references ==
- Jenkins, Roy. Gladstone (2002)(originally published 1995), Pan ISBN 0-33041-171-3

Parliament of the United Kingdom
Vacant Title last held by Viscount Ingestre; Viscount Mahon	Member of Parliament for Hertford; 1835–1868; With: Viscount Mahon 1835–1852; Thomas Chambers 1852–1857; Sir Walter Townshend-Farquhar, Bt 1857–1866; Robert Dimsdale from 1866	Succeeded by Robert Dimsdale
Preceded by Sir Jervoise Clark-Jervois, Bt; Henry Hamlyn-Fane	Member of Parliament for Hampshire South; 1868–1880; With: Lord Henry Montagu-Douglas-Scott	Succeeded by Francis Compton; Lord Henry Montagu-Douglas-Scott
Political offices
Preceded by Hon. Henry FitzRoy	Civil Lord of the Admiralty; 1846–1852	Succeeded by Hon. Arthur Duncombe
Preceded by Hon. Arthur Duncombe	Civil Lord of the Admiralty; 1852–1855	Succeeded by Sir Robert Peel, Bt
Preceded by Hon. Henry FitzRoy	Under-Secretary of State for the Home Department; 1855	Succeeded by William Nathaniel Massey
Preceded by Sir Benjamin Hall, Bt	President of the Board of Health; 1855–1857	Succeeded by William Monsell
New office	Vice President of the Council; 1857–1858	Succeeded by Charles Adderley
Preceded by William Monsell	President of the Board of Health; 1857–1858	Succeeded by Charles Adderley
Preceded by James Wilson	Vice-President of the Board of Trade; 1859–1860	Succeeded by William Hutt
Preceded by James Wilson	Paymaster General; 1859–1860	Succeeded by William Hutt
Preceded by Hon. Henry FitzRoy	First Commissioner of Works; 1860–1866	Succeeded by Lord John Manners
Peerage of the United Kingdom
New creation	Baron Mount Temple; 1880–1888	Extinct
