= Eleanor Thornton =

British actress and model (1880–1915)

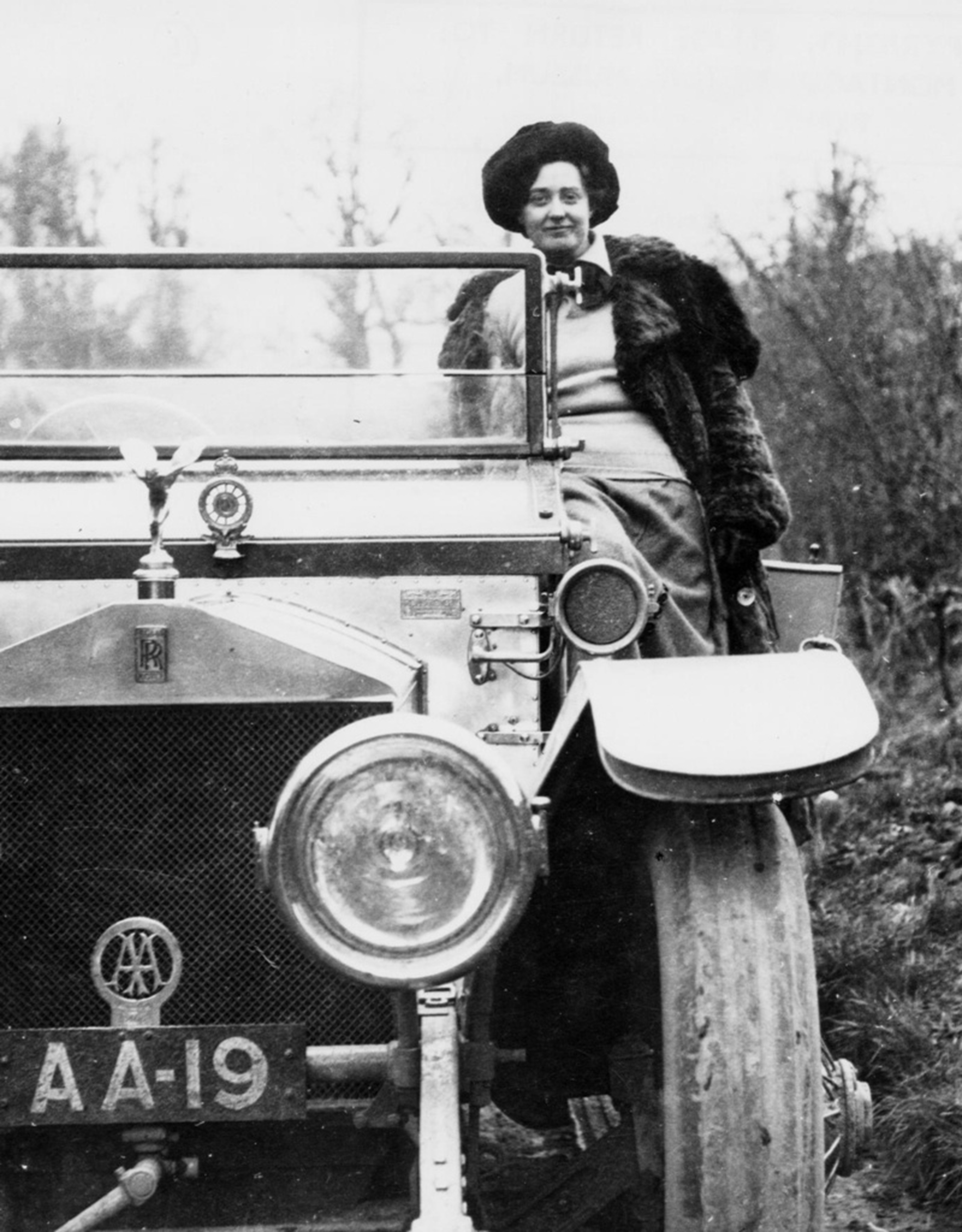
Eleanor Thornton with the original Spirit of Ecstasy in 1911

Eleanor Velasco Thornton (15 April 1880 – 30 December 1915) was an English actress and artist's model.

== Biography ==
Eleanor Velasco Thornton was the name adopted by Nelly Thornton, born at 18 Cottage Grove, Stockwell, London. Her father was Frederick Thornton, an Australian telegraph engineer; her mother was Sarah Ann Thornton.

Despite stories that her mother was Spanish, her mother's family were from humble origins in the City of London, and the names Eleanor and Velasco appear to be merely names she adopted when she started working in the office of a motoring magazine, Car Illustrated, after leaving school.

At 22, she was the secretary of John Edward Scott-Montagu, who became the second Baron Montagu of Beaulieu in 1905. She became his mistress and they had an illegitimate daughter, Joan Eleanor Thornton, whom she gave up for adoption. Thornton posed for sculptor Charles Sykes and may have been the model for his Spirit of Ecstasy, which is used as the bonnet/hood ornament on cars manufactured by Rolls-Royce, as well as a precursor sculpture, The Whisperer.

She drowned with hundreds of other passengers on 30 December 1915 when the SS Persia, on which she was travelling with Montagu through the Mediterranean on the way to India, was torpedoed without warning by the German U-boat U-38, commanded by Max Valentiner. Montagu survived the sinking. The Probate Registry for June 1916 shows that her sister Rose (1887–1945), by that time the last surviving member of her immediate family, administered her will. Amongst her effects was probably a similar silver model of the Spirit of Ecstasy, which it is presumed Rose kept. Rose married Gordon Willis Hayter in 1923, and many years later, the silver model was stolen from the home of Dorothy Hayter, Gordon's second wife.

== Recognition ==
In 2026 a blue plaque honoring her was unveiled on Charlotte Street in Leamington Spa.
