= Elizabeth Varley =

English actress and writer

The Honourable Elizabeth Varley
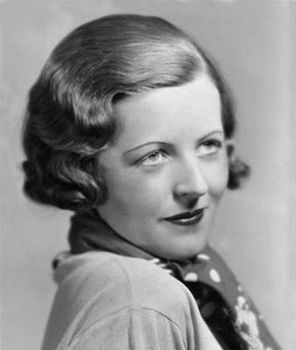
- Varley in 1930
- Born: Elizabeth Susan Douglas-Scott-Montagu; 26 September 1909; Beaulieu Abbey, Hampshire, England
- Died: 6 May 2002 (aged 92)
- Education: St. Margaret's School, Bushey; Royal Academy of Dramatic Arts
- Occupation: Actress
- Years active: 1937–1948
- Spouse: Arthur Noel Claude Varley (m. 1962; died 1985)
- Parent(s): John Douglas-Scott-Montagu, 2nd Baron Montagu of Beaulieu; Lady Cecil Kerr

The Honourable Elizabeth Susan Varley (née Douglas-Scott-Montagu; 26 September 1909 – 6 May 2002) was an English actress and the daughter of John Douglas-Scott-Montagu, 2nd Baron Montagu of Beaulieu. She pursued careers in the entertainment industry, literature and advertising.

== Early life ==
Elizabeth Montagu was born at Beaulieu Abbey, Hampshire, on 26 September 1909, the second daughter of the John Douglas-Scott-Montagu, 2nd Baron Montagu of Beaulieu by his first wife Lady Cecil Kerr, the daughter of Schomberg Kerr, 9th Marquess of Lothian. She was a direct descendant of Charles II and Lucy Walter, through their son, James Scott, 1st Duke of Monmouth. Her mother died in the 1918 flu pandemic. Montagu attended St Margaret's School, Bushey and a finishing school at Lausanne, but she was not interested in society life and chose instead to train as an actress at the Royal Academy of Dramatic Arts from 1932.

== Film and theatre ==
Varley began an acting career at the Newcastle Repertory Company and appeared in several West End stage productions and on BBC Radio dramas. She was personal assistant to Arturo Toscanini while he was in London to conduct at the BBC's London Music Festivals in 1937–1938. She helped Walter Legge found the Philharmonia Orchestra. After the war, she worked on film scripts for directors such as Alexander Korda.

In 1948 Montagu met Graham Greene in Vienna. She showed him (and later Orson Welles) some of its less reputable night clubs, while he worked on the script for The Third Man. She introduced Greene to Peter Smolka, the eastern European correspondent for The Times. Smolka gave Greene stories about the black market in Vienna. She was a committee member of Benjamin Britten's English Opera Group; she also wrote libretti for Rolf Liebermann and Paul Burkhard.

== European travels ==
She travelled extensively through Europe in 1935–1939, and studied at a piano school in Switzerland. When asked about her racial background while applying for a visa at the German consulate in St. Gallen, she angrily swept items – including a portrait of Hitler – from the desktop onto the floor. Her passport was confiscated.

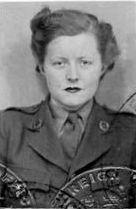
Elizabeth Susan Douglas-Scott-Montagu

Montagu was sent to France at the start of the Second World War as an ambulance driver. After her unit retreated to Bordeaux, she refused to leave and hid at a friend's home for several months. On a train to Switzerland she noticed she was under surveillance, and so asked two hat salesmen for help at the next station. She escaped while hidden under the boxes in their car.

While working at the Political Intelligence Department at the British Embassy in Berne, Montagu translated material from within Germany, including information on what was happening at Treblinka extermination camp.

== Advertising ==
In the 1960s she co-founded Francis-Montagu, a company that produced television advertising. Its clients included Ryvita and Black Magic chocolates.

== Politics ==
Montagu's times in theatrical digs had created strong socialist leanings. She became involved in the women's committee of the Campaign for Nuclear Disarmament.

== Personal life ==
Having been the lover of the classical pianist Renata Borgatti (1894–1964), she became the fourth wife on 29 August 1962 of Colonel Arthur Noel Claude Varley CBE (mil., 1902–1985), founder of the advertising agency Colman, Prentis and Varley. There were no children of the marriage.

She wrote an autobiography, Honourable Rebel: The Memoirs of Elizabeth Montagu (later Elizabeth Varley) (Beaulieu: Montagu Ventures, 2003), ISBN 0952338610. A film of her life, Honourable Rebel, appeared in 2015.
