= Henry Douglas-Scott-Montagu, 1st Baron Montagu of Beaulieu =

British politician (1832–1905)

The Right Honourable The Lord Montagu of Beaulieu JP DL
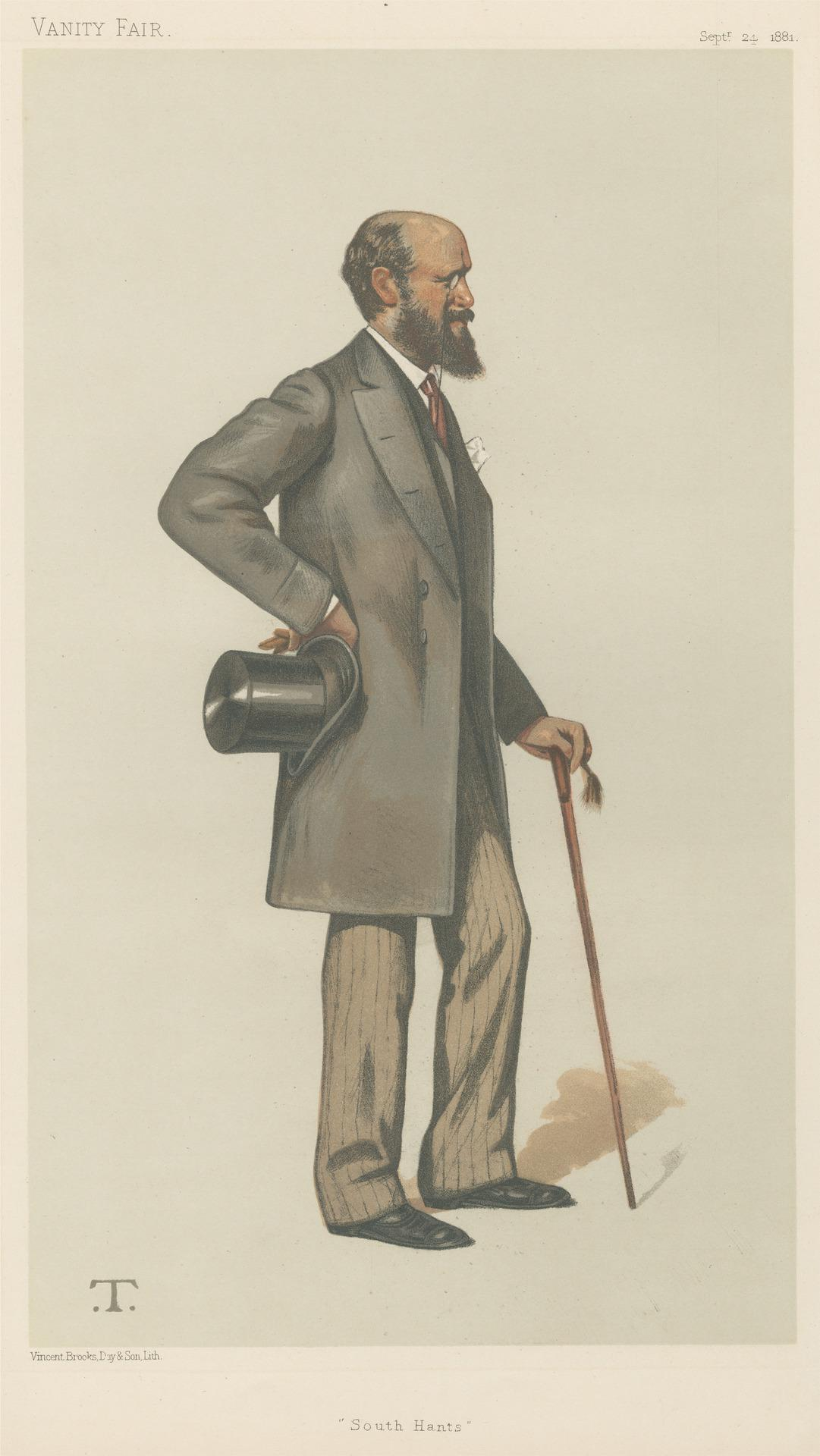
- Scott as caricatured by Théobald Chartran in Vanity Fair, September 1881

Member of the House of Lords Lord Temporal
- In office 29 December 1885 – 4 November 1905; Hereditary Peerage
- Preceded by: Peerage created
- Succeeded by: The 2nd Lord Montagu of Beaulieu

Member of Parliament for South Hampshire
- In office 7 December 1868 – 23 June 1884
- Preceded by: Henry Hamlyn-Fane
- Succeeded by: Sir Frederick Fitzwygram Bt.

Member of Parliament for Selkirkshire
- In office 1 August 1861 – 7 December 1868
- Preceded by: Allan Eliott-Lockhart
- Succeeded by: constituency abolished

Personal details
- Born: Henry John Montagu Douglas Scott; 5 November 1832 Dalkeith, Midlothian, Scotland
- Died: 4 November 1905 (aged 72) Beaulieu, Hampshire, England
- Party: Conservative
- Spouse: Hon. Cecily Montagu-Stuart-Wortley (m. 1865)
- Children: 3, including the 2nd Baron Montagu of Beaulieu
- Parents: Walter Montagu Douglas Scott, 5th Duke of Buccleuch; Lady Charlotte Thynne

Henry John Douglas-Scott-Montagu, 1st Baron Montagu of Beaulieu JP, DL (5 November 1832 – 4 November 1905), styled Lord Henry Scott until 1885, was a British Conservative politician, aristocrat and landowner.

== Background and education ==
Montagu was born at Dalkeith Palace in Midlothian, the second son of Walter Montagu Douglas Scott, 5th Duke of Buccleuch and Lady Charlotte Anne Thynne, daughter of Thomas Thynne, 2nd Marquess of Bath.

He suffered from severe asthma. (Note: He was likely born premature or in frail health, as his birth was not announced for 10 days, which is atypical practice for the era.) He was educated at Eton but was forced to leave after a few years, as it was recommended by physicians he spend the cold British winters in a warmer climate. Accordingly, at 15, he and his tutor, the Rev Henry Stobart, travelled overseas each winter. These trips became longer and took them further afield. Madeira, Egypt, the West Indies, Turkey, Greece, South Africa, and the Pacific Islands were visited over the next 14 years.

In March 1853, he and his friend, Lord Schomberg Kerr and their tutor arrived at Sydney. Young British aristocrats were rare visitors to New South Wales, and Sydney matrons with unmarried daughters ensured they did not lack invitations to dinners, balls and other social events. Lord Henry made many sketches and paintings in the colony, some of which are now held by the Mitchell Library and John Oxley Library in Australia.

He was especially interested in Egypt and before he was 40 had been up and down the Nile seven times. When he got married in 1865, his father gifted him Beaulieu Palace House.

== Political career ==
Montagu sat as Conservative Member of Parliament for Selkirkshire from 1861 to 1868 and for South Hampshire from 1868 to 1884. He was a strong advocate of commoners' rights and helped pass the New Forest Act, 1877 on behalf of the New Forest commoners. He was official Verderer of the New Forest from 1890 to 1892, and Honorary Colonel of the 4th Hampshire Rifle Volunteers from 1885. In 1885, he was raised to the peerage as Baron Montagu of Beaulieu, in the County of Southampton.

== Personal life ==
Lord Montagu of Beaulieu married The Hon. Cecily Susan Stuart-Wortley, daughter of John Stuart-Wortley, 2nd Baron Wharncliffe, in 1865. In 1899, Lady Montagu gave £1 to the Women's Suffrage Auxiliary Fund of the Englishwoman's Review. They had two sons (including John Douglas-Scott-Montagu, 2nd Baron Montagu of Beaulieu) and one daughter, the Honourable Rachel Cecily Montagu-Scott, wife of Henry Forster, 1st Baron Forster. Through his daughter Rachel, he was the maternal grandfather of the actress Mary Hinton.

He died in 1905 at Beaulieu Palace House in Beaulieu, Hampshire, one day prior to his 73rd birthday. The cause of death was heart failure blamed on his lifelong poor health.

== Notes ==
Parliament of the United Kingdom
Preceded by Allen Eliott-Lockhart	Member of Parliament for Selkirkshire; 1861 – 1868	Constituency abolished
Preceded by Henry Hamlyn-Fane; Sir Jervoise Clarke-Jervois, Bt	Member of Parliament for South Hampshire; 1868 – 1884; With: Hon. William Cowper to 1880; Francis Compton from 1880	Succeeded by Francis Compton; Sir Frederick Fitzwygram, Bt
Peerage of the United Kingdom
New creation	Baron Montagu of Beaulieu; 1885 – 1905	Succeeded by John Douglas-Scott-Montagu
