= Henry Hamlyn-Fane =

British soldier and politician

Member of Parliament for South Hampshire
- In office 11 July 1865 – 11 November 1868 Serving with Sir Jervoise Clarke-Jervoise, Bt
- Preceded by: Sir Jervoise Clarke-Jervoise, Bt/Hon. Ralph Dutton
- Succeeded by: Hon. William Cowper/Lord Henry Douglas-Scott-Montagu

Personal details
- Born: Henry Fane; 5 September 1817 Fulbeck, Lincolnshire
- Died: 27 December 1868 (aged 51) Sopley, Hampshire
- Party: Conservative
- Spouse: Susan Hester (m. 1850)
- Children: 6
- Relatives: Sir James Hamlyn-Williams, 3rd Baronet (father-in-law)
- Profession: Soldier, politician

Military service
- Allegiance: United Kingdom
- Branch/service: British Army
- Rank: Lieutenant-Colonel
- Unit: 4th Light Dragoons

Lieutenant-Colonel Henry Edward Hamlyn-Fane (5 September 1817 – 27 December 1868), known as Henry Fane until 1861, was a British soldier and Conservative politician.

== Background ==
Born Henry Fane, he was the eldest son of Reverend Edward Fane, son of Henry Fane, younger son of Thomas Fane, 8th Earl of Westmorland. His mother was Maria, daughter of Walter Parry Hodges. In 1861 he assumed by Royal licence the additional surname of Hamlyn, which was that of his father-in-law (see below).

== Military and political career ==
Hamlyn-Fane was a Lieutenant-Colonel in the 4th Light Dragoons. In 1865 he was returned to Parliament for Hampshire South, a seat he held until November 1868.

== Family ==
Hamlyn-Fane married Susan Hester, daughter of Sir James Hamlyn-Williams, 3rd Baronet, in 1850, through which marriage Clovelly court, Clovelly, Devon, came into the Fane family. They had two sons and four daughters. Hamlyn-Fane died at his country seat, Avon Tyrrell, Hampshire, in December 1868, aged 51. His wife only survived him by a few months and died at Clovelly Court in May 1869, aged 45.

== See also ==
- Earl of Westmorland

Parliament of the United Kingdom
Preceded by Sir Jervoise Clarke-Jervois, Bt; Hon. Ralph Dutton	Member of Parliament for Hampshire South; 1865–1868; With: Sir Jervoise Clarke-Jervois, Bt	Succeeded by Hon. William Cowper; Lord Henry Douglas-Scott-Montagu
