= John Douglas-Scott-Montagu, 2nd Baron Montagu of Beaulieu =

British politician

Brigadier The Right Honourable The Lord Montagu of Beaulieu KCIE CSI VD DL
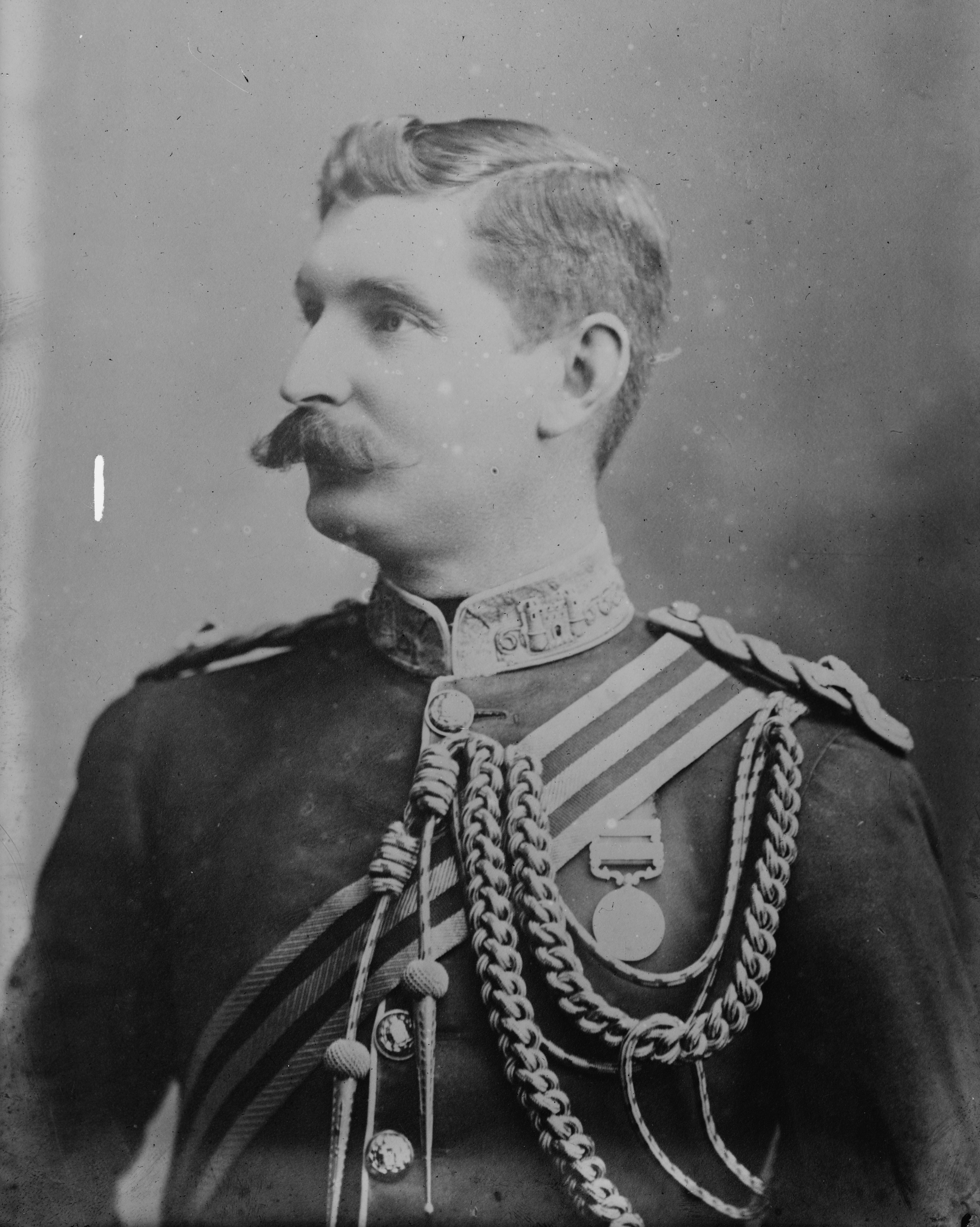
- The Lord Montagu of Beaulieu c. 1915

Member of the House of Lords Lord Temporal
- In office 5 November 1905 – 30 March 1929; Hereditary Peerage
- Preceded by: The 1st Lord Montagu of Beaulieu
- Succeeded by: The 3rd Lord Montagu of Beaulieu

Member of Parliament for New Forest
- In office 26 July 1892 – 4 November 1905
- Preceded by: Francis Compton
- Succeeded by: Henry Francis Compton

Personal details
- Born: 10 June 1866
- Died: 30 March 1929 (aged 62)
- Spouse(s): Lady Cecil Kerr (m. 1889; died 1919) Alice Pearl Crake (m. 1920)
- Children: 7, including Elizabeth and Edward, 3rd Lord Montagu of Beaulieu
- Parent(s): Henry Douglas-Scott-Montagu, 1st Baron Montagu of Beaulieu; Cecily Susan Stuart-Wortley

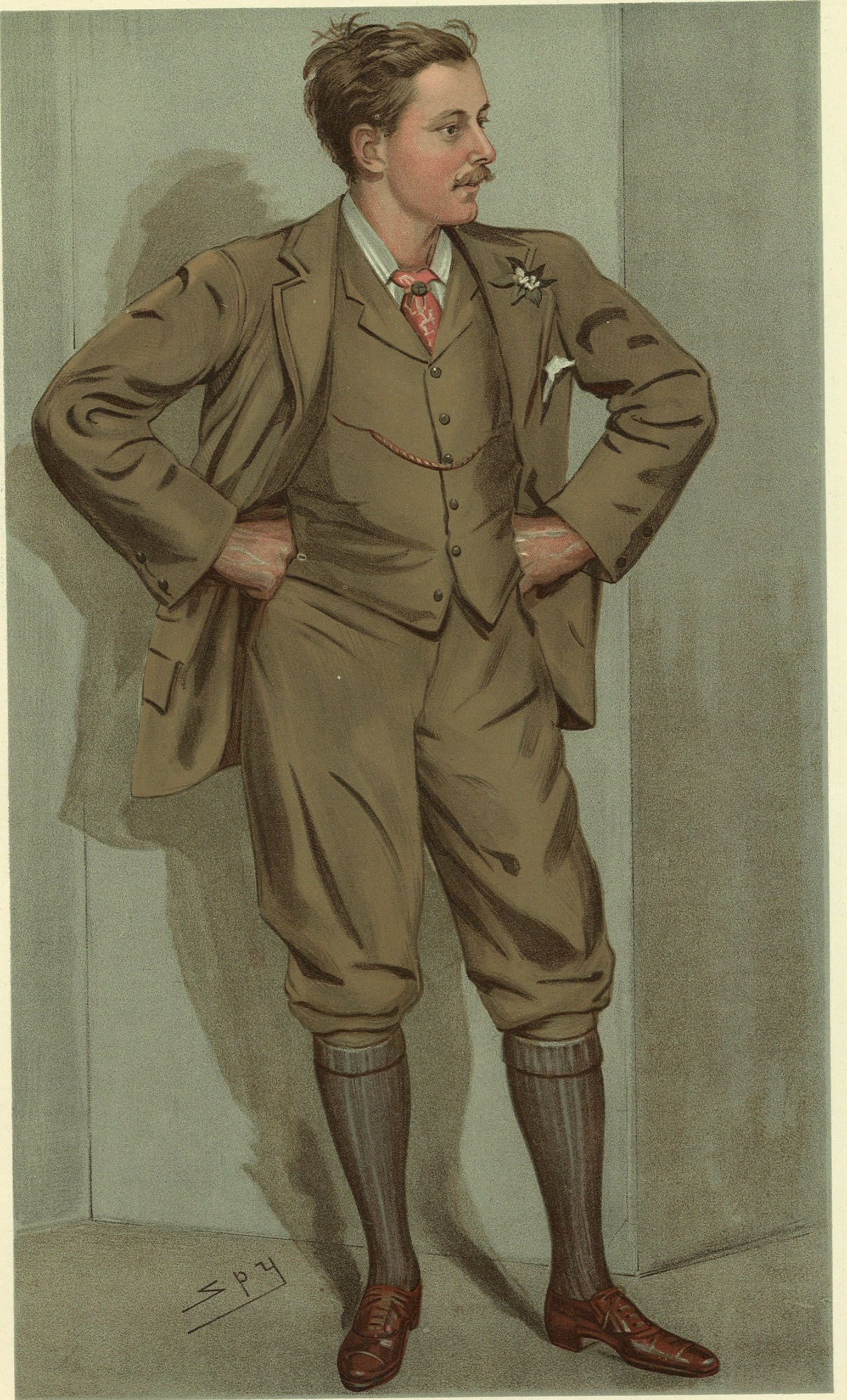
J. W. E. Montagu-Scott from Vanity Fair

John Walter Edward Douglas-Scott-Montagu, 2nd Baron Montagu of Beaulieu KCIE CSI DL (10 June 1866 – 30 March 1929), was a British Conservative politician, soldier and promoter of motoring. He was the father of Edward Douglas-Scott-Montagu, 3rd Baron Montagu of Beaulieu who would go on to found the National Motor Museum, Beaulieu in Montagu's memory.

== Background, education and early life ==
Montagu was the eldest son of Henry Montagu-Scott, 1st Baron Montagu of Beaulieu, second son of Walter Montagu Douglas Scott, 5th Duke of Buccleuch. His mother was the Hon. Cecily Susan, daughter of John Stuart-Wortley, 2nd Baron Wharncliffe. He went to Eton College where he rowed, and shot for his school at Wimbledon.

He then went to New College, Oxford and helped the New College boat to the Head of the River. He rowed for the Oxford Etonians in the 1887 Grand Challenge Cup with Guy Nickalls and Douglas McLean although without success. He worked for a year in the sheds of the London and South Western Railway and became a practical engineer. He subsequently travelled around the world with his cousin, Lord Ancram, and his friend, Lord Ennismore.

== Political career ==
Montagu entered Parliament for New Forest in 1895, a seat he held until 1905, when he succeeded his father in the barony and entered the House of Lords. During the First World War Montagu was an acting member of the War Aircraft Committee from March to April 1916 and an adviser on Mechanical Transport Services to the Indian government (with the rank of Honorary Brigadier-General). He is chiefly remembered as a promoter of motoring and was the founder and editor of The Car Illustrated magazine and a member of the Road Board.

His wife was the founder of the Ladies Automobile Club in 1903. Nearly half of the first fifty members who paid the two guineas annual membership fee were women with titles. Lady Millicent Sutherland was the first elected President in 1904 and Ada Annie Watney and Edith Vane-Tempest-Stewart, Marchioness of Londonderry were founders and members of the first committee of the Ladies Automobile Club.

== Family ==
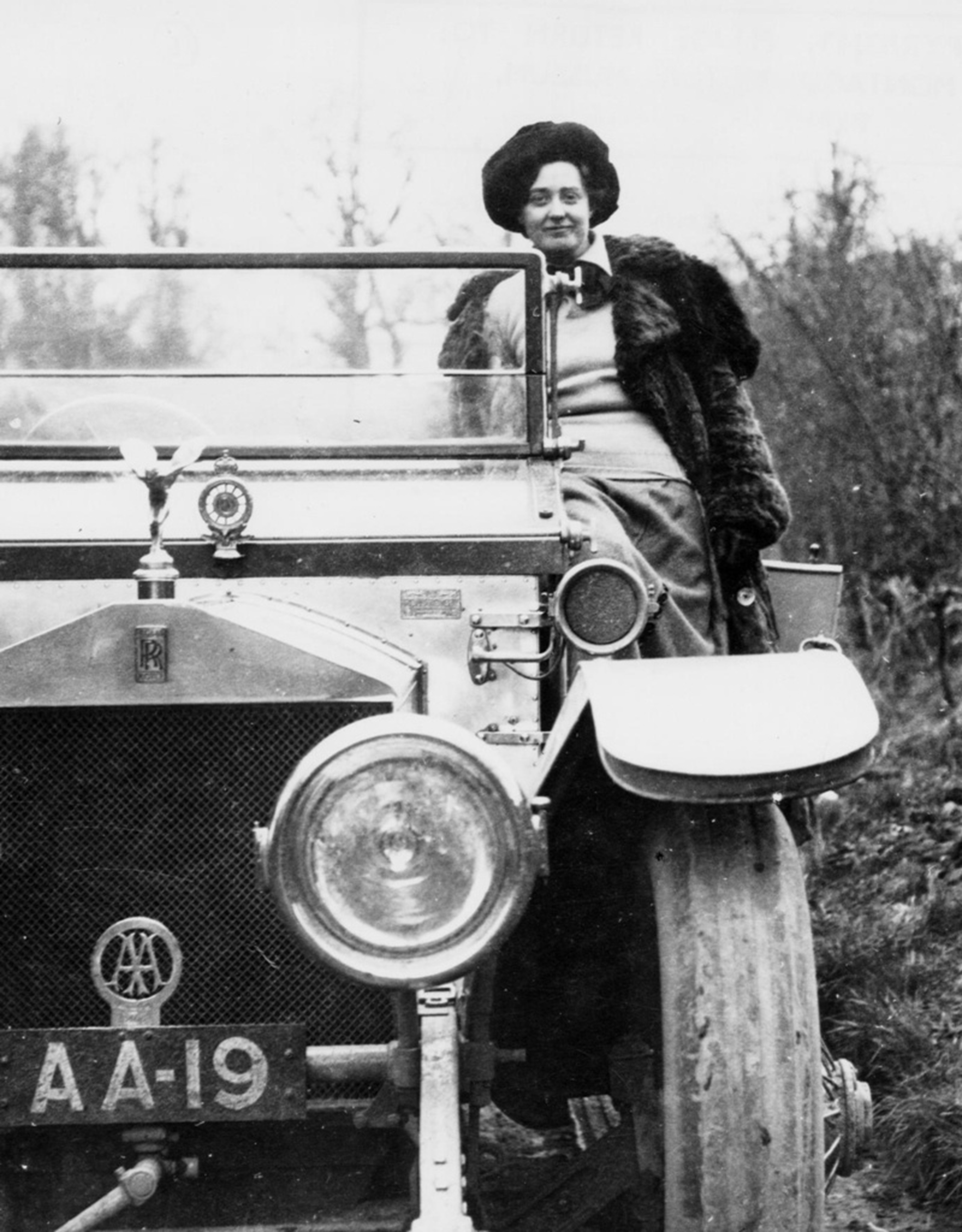
Eleanor Velasco Thornton

Lord Montagu of Beaulieu married firstly his cousin Lady Cecil Kerr, daughter of Schomberg Kerr, 9th Marquess of Lothian and Lady Victoria Montagu Douglas Scott in 1889. She died in September 1919, aged 53. He married secondly Alice Pearl, daughter of Major Edward Barrington Crake, in 1920. There were children from both marriages, including Elizabeth. Lord Montagu of Beaulieu died in March 1929, aged 62, and was succeeded in the barony by his only son, Edward. Lady Montagu of Beaulieu later remarried and died in April 1996, aged 101.

During his first marriage Beaulieu had a daughter by his mistress and secretary Eleanor Velasco Thornton. Wanting an appropriate mascot for his Rolls-Royce, and using Eleanor Thornton as a model, the sculptor Charles Robinson Sykes was commissioned to design the precursor (called "The Whisper") of the Spirit of Ecstasy; the famous winged mascot that has adorned nearly every Rolls-Royce car since 1911. On 30 December 1915, with Thornton, Montagu was on board the SS Persia sailing through the Mediterranean on the way to India when the ship was torpedoed without warning by the German U-boat U-38 commanded by Max Valentiner. Thornton drowned, along with hundreds of others, but Montagu survived the sinking.

Parliament of the United Kingdom
Preceded by Francis Compton	Member of Parliament for New Forest; 1892 – 1905	Succeeded by Henry Francis Compton
Peerage of the United Kingdom
Preceded by Henry Douglas-Scott-Montagu	Baron Montagu of Beaulieu; 1905–1929	Succeeded by Edward Douglas-Scott-Montagu
