= South Hampshire (constituency) =

Former parliamentary constituency in the United Kingdom

- Former county constituency for the House of Commons
- Context of 1832-1868. Extract from 1837 result: the southern 'doubly' blue (mainland) area.
- County: Hampshire

1832–1885
- Seats: Two
- Created from: Hampshire
- Replaced by: New Forest; Fareham; Winchester (minor addition to)

South Hampshire (formally the Southern division of Hampshire) was a parliamentary constituency in the county of Hampshire, which returned two Members of Parliament (MPs) to the House of Commons of the Parliament of the United Kingdom, elected by the bloc vote system.

It was created under the Great Reform Act for the 1832 general election, and abolished by the Redistribution of Seats Act 1885 for the 1885 general election.

== Boundaries ==
1832–1885: The Petty Sessional Divisions of Fareham, Lymington, Ringwood, Romsey and Southampton, and the Town and County of the Town of Southampton.

== Members of Parliament ==
Election	1st Member	1st Party	2nd Member	2nd Party
1832	The Viscount Palmerston	Whig	Sir George Staunton, Bt	Whig
1835	John Willis Fleming	Conservative	Henry Combe Compton	Conservative
1842 by-election	Lord Charles Wellesley	Conservative	Henry Combe Compton	Conservative
1852	Lord William Cholmondeley	Conservative	Henry Combe Compton	Conservative
1857	Sir Jervoise Clarke-Jervoise	Whig	Hon. Ralph Dutton	Conservative
1859	Sir Jervoise Clarke-Jervoise	Liberal	Hon. Ralph Dutton	Conservative
1865	Sir Jervoise Clarke-Jervoise	Liberal	Henry Hamlyn-Fane	Conservative
1868	Hon. William Temple	Liberal	Lord Henry Montagu-Douglas-Scott	Conservative
1880	Francis Compton	Conservative	Lord Henry Montagu-Douglas-Scott	Conservative
1884 by-election	Francis Compton	Conservative	Sir Frederick Fitzwygram, Bt	Conservative
1885	constituency abolished			

== Election results ==
=== Elections in the 1830s ===
General election 1832: South Hampshire
Party	Candidate	Votes	%
Whig	Viscount Palmerston	1,627	36.7
Whig	George Staunton	1,542	34.8
Tory	John Willis Fleming	1,266	28.5
Majority		276	6.3
Turnout		2,762	87.9
Registered electors		3,143	
Whig win (new seat)			
Whig win (new seat)			

General election 1835: South Hampshire
Party	Candidate	Votes	%	±%
Conservative	John Willis Fleming	1,746	27.3	+13.1
Conservative	Henry Combe Compton	1,689	26.4	+12.2
Whig	Viscount Palmerston	1,504	23.5	−13.2
Whig	George Staunton	1,450	22.7	−12.1
Majority		185	2.9	−3.4
Turnout		3,260	86.1	−1.8
Registered electors		3,785		
Conservative gain from Whig		Swing	+12.9	
Conservative gain from Whig		Swing	+12.4	

General election 1837: South Hampshire
Party	Candidate	Votes	%	±%
Conservative	John Willis Fleming	2,388	27.1	−0.2
Conservative	Henry Combe Compton	2,371	26.9	+0.5
Whig	George Staunton	2,080	23.6	+0.1
Whig	John Ommanney	1,962	22.3	−0.4
Majority		291	3.3	+0.4
Turnout		4,376	78.2	+7.9
Registered electors		5,598		
Conservative hold		Swing	±0.0	
Conservative hold		Swing	+0.3	

=== Elections in the 1840s ===
General election 1841: South Hampshire
Party	Candidate	Votes	%	±%
Conservative	John Willis Fleming	Unopposed		
Conservative	Henry Combe Compton	Unopposed		
Registered electors		5,794		
Conservative hold				
Conservative hold				

Fleming resigned by accepting the office of Steward of the Chiltern Hundreds, causing a by-election.

By-election, 23 August 1842: South Hampshire
Party	Candidate	Votes	%	±%
Conservative	Charles Wellesley	Unopposed		
Conservative hold				

General election 1847: South Hampshire
Party	Candidate	Votes	%	±%
Conservative	Charles Wellesley	Unopposed		
Conservative	Henry Combe Compton	Unopposed		
Registered electors		5,812		
Conservative hold				
Conservative hold				

=== Elections in the 1850s ===
General election 1852: South Hampshire
Party	Candidate	Votes	%	±%
Conservative	William Cholmondeley	Unopposed		
Conservative	Henry Combe Compton	Unopposed		
Registered electors		5,694		
Conservative hold				
Conservative hold				

General election 1857: South Hampshire
Party	Candidate	Votes	%	±%
Conservative	Ralph Dutton	Unopposed		
Whig	Jervoise Clarke-Jervoise	Unopposed		
Registered electors		5,525		
Conservative hold				
Whig gain from Conservative				

General election 1859: South Hampshire
Party	Candidate	Votes	%	±%
Conservative	Ralph Dutton	Unopposed		
Liberal	Jervoise Clarke-Jervoise	Unopposed		
Registered electors		5,865		
Conservative hold				
Liberal hold				

=== Elections in the 1860s ===
General election 1865: South Hampshire
Party	Candidate	Votes	%	±%
Conservative	Henry Hamlyn-Fane	Unopposed		
Liberal	Jervoise Clarke-Jervoise	Unopposed		
Registered electors		5,677		
Conservative hold				
Liberal hold				

General election 1868: South Hampshire
Party	Candidate	Votes	%	±%
Liberal	William Cowper	2,797	25.4	N/A
Conservative	Henry Douglas-Scott-Montagu	2,756	25.1	N/A
Liberal	Clement Milward	2,726	24.8	N/A
Conservative	John Carpenter Garnier	2,716	24.7	N/A
Turnout		5,498 (est)	67.6 (est)	N/A
Registered electors		8,135		
Majority		81	0.7	N/A
Liberal hold		Swing	N/A	
Majority		30	0.3	N/A
Conservative hold		Swing	N/A	

=== Elections in the 1870s ===
General election 1874: South Hampshire
Party	Candidate	Votes	%	±%
Conservative	Henry Douglas-Scott-Montagu	3,878	42.1	−7.7
Liberal	William Cowper-Temple	2,946	32.0	+6.6
Liberal	Clement Swanston	2,382	25.9	+1.1
Majority		932	10.1	+9.8
Turnout		6,542 (est)	68.3 (est)	+0.7
Registered electors		9,578		
Conservative hold		Swing	−2.5	
Liberal hold		Swing	+5.2	

=== Elections in the 1880s ===
General election 1880: South Hampshire
Party	Candidate	Votes	%	±%
Conservative	Francis Compton	Unopposed		
Conservative	Henry Douglas-Scott-Montagu	Unopposed		
Registered electors		10,162		
Conservative hold				
Conservative gain from Liberal				

Douglas-Scott-Montagu resigned, causing a by-election.

By-election, 23 Jun 1884: South Hampshire
Party	Candidate	Votes	%	±%
Conservative	Frederick Fitzwygram	4,209	60.3	N/A
Liberal	William Henry Deverell	2,772	39.7	New
Majority		1,437	20.6	N/A
Turnout		6,981	67.8	N/A
Registered electors		10,296		
Conservative hold		Swing	N/A	

== Sources ==
- Leigh Rayment's Historical List of MPs – Constituencies beginning with "H" (part 1)
- Craig, F. W. S. (1989) [1974]. British parliamentary election results 1885–1918 (2nd ed.). Chichester: Parliamentary Research Services. p. 393. ISBN 0-900178-27-2.
