= Lord Charles Wellesley =

British politician, soldier and courtier (1808-1858)

Major-General Lord Charles Wellesley (16 January 1808 – 9 October 1858) was an Anglo-Irish soldier, Conservative politician, and courtier from the aristocratic Wellesley family. He was the younger son of Prime Minister Arthur Wellesley, 1st Duke of Wellington.

== Early life and education ==
Lord Charles was born at the Chief Secretary's Lodge, Phoenix Park, Dublin, the second of two sons of Arthur Wellesley, 1st Duke of Wellington and Catherine Pakenham Wellesley, Duchess of Wellington.

He was educated at Eton College, and matriculated at Christ Church, Oxford in 1824, aged 16. He was rusticated by the Dean of Christ Church, Samuel Smith, transferring in 1826 to Trinity College, Cambridge.

== Career ==
Lord Charles entered the British Army in January 1824 at age 16. He accompanied his regiment, the 15th Regiment of Foot, to Canada during the Rebellions of 1837–1838. He returned in 1840 with the rank of lieutenant colonel. He retired from the army in 1845.

He was appointed Chief Equerry and Clerk Marshal to Queen Victoria in 1841 and held the post until 1846.

He represented the Conservative Party as the Member of Parliament (MP) for South Hampshire from 1842 to 1852, and the MP for Windsor from 1852 to 1855. As a politician, Lord Charles was a liberal conservative who voted for free trade and supported Prime Minister Sir Robert Peel's progressive policies.

He left Parliament in February 1855 due to loss of sight.

== Marriage and issue ==
Lord Charles married Augusta Sophia Anne Pierrepont, daughter of The Hon. Henry Pierrepont, on 9 July 1844. They had six children:

- Arthur Wellesley (5 May 1845 – 7 July 1846)
- Major Henry Wellesley, 3rd Duke of Wellington (5 April 1846 – 8 June 1900)
- Lady Victoria Alexandrina Wellesley (2 April 1847 – 31 July 1933), named for her godmother Queen Victoria; married in 1877 Ion Hamilton, 1st Baron HolmPatrick
- Colonel Arthur Charles Wellesley, 4th Duke of Wellington (15 March 1849 – 18 June 1934), married in 1872 Kathleen Bulkeley Williams
- Lady Mary Angela Wellesley (21 October 1850 – 26 April 1936), married in 1875 George Arthur Jervoise Scott, son of James Winter Scott
- Georgina Wellesley (15 May 1853 – 3 February 1880), married banker William Rolle Malcolm; mother of Sir Dougal Orme Malcolm (1877–1955)

After several months of declining health, Lord Charles died on 9 October 1858 at Conholt Park, Wiltshire.

When his older brother, Arthur, died in 1884 with no heirs, Lord Charles's eldest surviving son, Henry, inherited his uncle's dukedom as Duke of Wellington. His other surviving children were raised to the rank and precedence of children of a duke in November 1884.

When Henry also died childless in 1900, the peerage passed to Lord Charles' third son Arthur Wellesley, Henry's brother.

Parliament of the United Kingdom
Preceded by Henry Combe Compton; John Willis Fleming	Member of Parliament for South Hampshire; 1842–1852; With: Henry Combe Compton	Succeeded by Sir Jervoise Clarke-Jervoise, 2nd Baronet; Hon. Ralph Dutton
Preceded by John Hatchell	Member of Parliament for Windsor; 1852–1855; With: Charles William Grenfell	Succeeded by Samson Ricardo
