= Frederick Fitzwygram =

British Army general (1823–1904)

Lieutenant-General Sir Frederick Fitzwygram Bt DL JP
- Fitzwygram in 1895

Member of Parliament for Fareham
- In office 1885–1900
- Preceded by: New constituency
- Succeeded by: Arthur Lee

Member of Parliament for Hampshire South
- In office 1884–1885 Serving with Francis Compton
- Preceded by: Francis Compton; Lord Henry John Montagu-Douglas-Scott
- Succeeded by: Constituency abolished

Personal details
- Born: Frederick Wellington John Wigram; 29 August 1823
- Died: 9 December 1904 (aged 81)
- Party: Conservative
- Spouse: Angela Frances Mary Vaughan (m. 1882)
- Parent(s): Sir Robert Fitzwygram, 2nd Baronet; Selina Hayes

Lieutenant-General Sir Frederick Wellington John Fitzwygram, 4th Baronet, DL, JP (29 August 1823 – 9 December 1904) was a British Army cavalry officer, expert on horses and Conservative politician.

== Early life ==
Fitzwygram was born on 29 August 1823. He was the third son of Sir Robert Fitzwygram, 2nd Baronet, and his wife Selina Hayes. In 1832, his father legally changed their surname to Fitzwygram by Royal licence. An elder sister, Augusta Catherine Fitzwygram, married Sir George Baker, 3rd Baronet, and his youngest brother, Loftus Adam Fitzwygram, married Lady Frances Butler-Danvers (sister of John Butler, 6th Earl of Lanesborough).

He became a cavalry officer and served with the 6th (Inniskilling) Dragoons in the Crimean War. He subsequently commanded the Cavalry Brigade at Aldershot.

== Career ==
In 1873 he inherited the Wigram Baronetcy on the death of his elder brother Robert. He purchased the Leigh Park estate, at Havant, in 1874 and developed the grounds and gardens which were frequently thrown open to the public. He was a member of the Royal College of Veterinary Surgeons, and as president from 1875 to 1877 he unified the veterinary profession. He was active in public life. From 1879 to 1884 he was Inspector-General of Cavalry at Aldershot.

Fitzwygram was elected as Member of Parliament for Hampshire South in a by-election in 1884, and when the constituency was restructured, he became MP for Fareham in 1885. He held the seat until 1900, being interested in military and horse related matters in the House of Commons. Based on a series of lectures, published by Smith, Elder in 1862, he wrote an influential book on the care and management of horses Horses and Stables which was first published by Longmans, Green, Reader and Dyer of London in 1869. He was an honorary member of the Manchester Unity of Independent Order of Oddfellows, Royal Naval Lodge, England.

== Career ==
On 17 October 1882, Sir Frederick married Angela Frances Mary Vaughan, a daughter of Thomas Nugent Vaughan and Frances Mary (née Territt, formerly Viscountess Forbes) Vaughn. Her mother was the widow of George Forbes, Viscount Forbes, and from that earlier marriage, Angela had an older half-brother, George Forbes, 7th Earl of Granard, His maternal grandfather was William Territt of Chilton Hall. Together, they lived at Leigh Park at 20 Eaton Square, Belgravia, were the parents of two sons (only one survived childhood) and one daughter:

- Sir Frederick Loftus Francis Fitzwygram, 5th Baronet (1884–1920), who died unmarried.
- Angela Catherine Alice Fitzwygram (1885–1984), who died unmarried.

Sir Frederick died on 9 December 1904 and was succeeded in the baronetcy by his only son, Frederick.

=== Legacy ===
Fitzwygram's memorial in Havant church is the west window illustrating St. Gabriel and St. Michael.

== Arms ==
Coat of arms of Frederick Fitzwygram

Notes
Granted 20 July 1807 by Sir Chichester Fortescue, Ulster King of Arms
Crest
On a mount Vert a hand in armour in fess couped at the wrist Proper charged with an escallop and holding a fleur-de-lis erect Or.
Escutcheon
Argent on a pale Gules three escallops Or over all a chevron engrailed counterchanged and on a chief waves of the sea thereon a ship representing an English vessel of war of the sixteenth century with four masts sails furled Proper colours flying Gules.
Motto
Dulcis Amor Patriae

Parliament of the United Kingdom
Preceded by Francis Compton; Lord Henry John Montagu-Douglas-Scott	Member of Parliament for Hampshire South; 1884 – 1885; With: Francis Compton	Constituency abolished
New constituency	Member of Parliament for Fareham; 1885 – 1900	Succeeded by Arthur Lee
Baronetage of the United Kingdom
Preceded by Robert Fitzwygram	Baronet (of Walthamstow); 1873–1904	Succeeded by Frederick Fitzwygram
