= Henry Combe Compton =

British politician

Henry Combe Compton (1789 – 27 November 1866) was a British Conservative Party politician.

He was elected at the 1835 general election as a member of parliament (MP) for South Hampshire, and held the seat until he stood down from the House of Commons at the 1857 general election.

Parliament of the United Kingdom
Preceded by Viscount Palmerston; Sir George Staunton, Bt	Member of Parliament for South Hampshire; 1835–1857; With: John Willis Fleming 1835–1842; Lord Charles Wellesley 1842–1852; Lord Henry Cholmondeley 1852–1857	Succeeded by Sir Jervoise Clarke-Jervois, Bt; Hon. Ralph Dutton
