= Ralph Dutton (Conservative politician) =

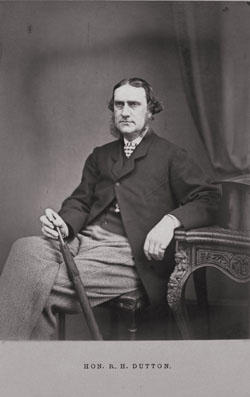
Hon. Ralph Heneage Dutton

The Hon. Ralph Heneage Dutton (5 August 1821 – 8 October 1892), was a British Conservative politician.

== Background ==
Dutton was the third and youngest son of John Dutton, 2nd Baron Sherborne, by his marriage to the Hon. Mary Legge, only child and heiress of Henry Bilson-Legge, 2nd Baron Stawell.

== Political career ==
Dutton was elected Member of Parliament for Hampshire South in 1857, a seat he held until 1865, and then represented Cirencester until 1868.

== Family ==
Dutton married Isabella, daughter of John Mansfield, in 1848. He died in October 1892, aged 71. They had one daughter, Isabella Mary Dutton (1854-1936) who married Sir John Simeon, 4th Baronet.

Parliament of the United Kingdom
Preceded by Henry Combe Compton; Lord William Cholmondeley	Member of Parliament for Hampshire South; 1857–1865; With: Sir Jervoise Clarke-Jervois, Bt	Succeeded by Sir Jervoise Clarke-Jervois, Bt; Henry Hamlyn-Fane
Preceded by Allen Bathurst; Hon. Ashley Ponsonby	Member of Parliament for Cirencester; 1865–1868; With: Allen Bathurst	Succeeded by Allen Bathurst (representation reduced to one member 1868)
