= Charles Robinson Sykes =

English sculptor (1875–1950)

- Born: 18 December 1875
- Died: 6 June 1950 (aged 74)
- Other name: Rilette (as illustrator)
- Occupations: sculptor, illustrator
- Known for: designer, Spirit of Ecstasy

Charles Robinson Sykes (18 December 1875 – 6 June 1950) was an English sculptor, best known for designing the Spirit of Ecstasy mascot which is used on Rolls-Royce cars.

== Early life ==
Sykes was born in 1875 in Brotton, in present-day Redcar and Cleveland, England.

== Sculpting career ==
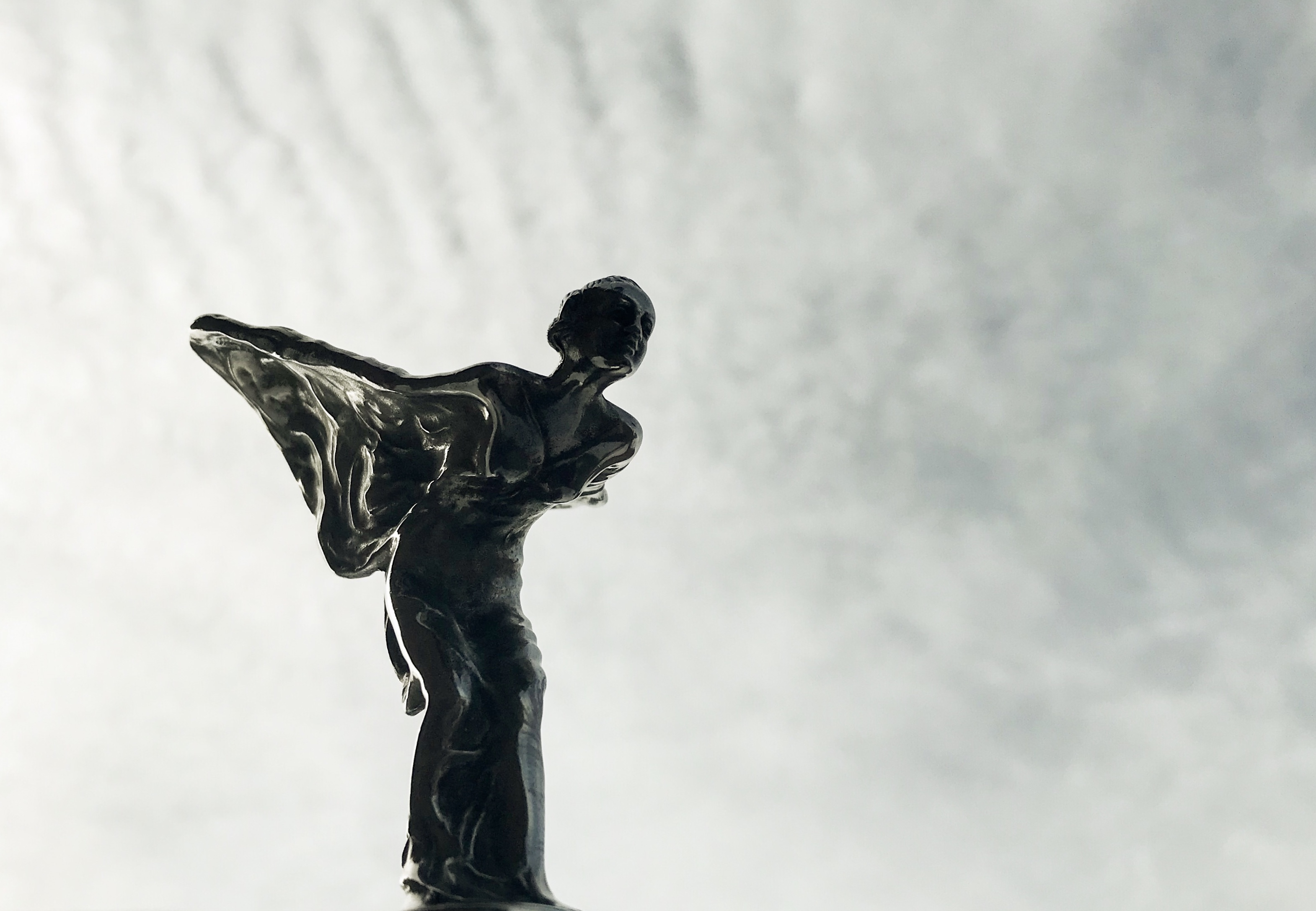
The Spirt of Ecstasy also called Emilie Sculptured by Charles Robinson Sykes

The Spirit of Ecstasy, also called "Emily", "Silver Lady" or "Flying Lady", carries with it a story about a secret passion between John Walter Edward Douglas-Scott-Montagu (second Lord Montagu of Beaulieu after 1905, a pioneer of the automobile movement, and editor of The Car magazine from 1902) and his secret love and the model for the emblem, Eleanor Velasco Thornton.

Sykes was commissioned by Lord Montagu to make a special mascot for his 1909 Rolls-Royce Silver Ghost. Sykes produced a small statue of a young woman in fluttering robes with a forefinger to her lips. It was named "The Whisper" and is to this day unique to the Montagu family's Rolls-Royces. The statue is displayed at the National Motor Museum in Beaulieu.

Sykes was also an illustrator under the pseudonym 'Rilette'. His work appeared on the cover of many issues of the magazine Woman published by Hutchinson and he designed many advertisements, especially for de Reszke cigarettes.
