= Robert Ney McNeely =

American politician

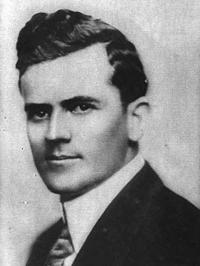

Consul to the Colony of Aden
- In office October 18, 1915 – December 30, 1915
- President: Woodrow Wilson

Member of the North Carolina Senate from the 23 district
- In office 1914 – October 18, 1915

Member of the North Carolina House of Representatives from the Union County district
- In office 1909–1910

Personal details
- Born: Robert Ney McNeely; November 12, 1883 Waxhaw, North Carolina, US
- Died: December 30, 1915 (aged 32) off the coast of Crete
- Cause of death: drowned
- Resting place: lost at sea
- Parents: Robert McNeely (father); Henrietta McNeely (née Belk) (mother)
- Education: University of North Carolina

Robert Ney McNeely (12 November 1883 – 30 December 1915) was a State Representative in North Carolina, a member of the North Carolina Senate, and later the American Consul at Aden. He died while en route to the Colony of Aden when the ship he was traveling on was sunk by a German U-boat, near Crete, in 1915.

== Born in North Carolina ==
Robert Ney McNeely was born on a farm in Jackson Township, Union County, North Carolina, near Waxhaw, on November 12, 1883. His father, Robert, named him after Marshall Ney of France. He was one of eleven children born to Robert and Henrietta McNeely.

== Career ==
When McNeely was 17 he started working as a teacher until 1902. In 1903, he became a rural mail carrier. McNeely started studying law under Judge James C. MacRae and was admitted to the bar in 1907, at Monroe, North Carolina. In 1907, he also served as the City Clerk, in Monroe, and then as Treasurer in 1908.

In 1909, McNeely was elected to represent Union County, in the North Carolina House of Representatives. He only served one two-year term. During this time, he earned his Bachelor of Laws degree from the University of North Carolina. He was next elected, in 1914, to the North Carolina Senate to represent the 23rd district.

In January 1915, McNeely took an examination for appointment to the US Consular Service and passed. He was appointed the American Consul at Aden on October 18, 1915.

== Death ==
McNeely left on the first leg of his trip for Aden on November 27, 1915, sailing from New York City to Liverpool on the Holland America Line's ship SS Rijndam. After arriving in England, he travelled to London, where he remained until December 18, when he boarded the P&O passenger liner Persia, for Aden.

Wreck location

Just after 13:00, on December 30, 1915, the German U-boat U-38 torpedoed Persia off of the island of Crete. McNeely drowned and his body was lost at sea.

== Bibliography ==
- "2 January 1916 – Ted – The Sinking of the Persia". familyletters.co.uk. January 2, 2016.
- "The Sinking of the SS Persia".
