= Sir Jervoise Clarke-Jervoise, 2nd Baronet =

British politician (1804–1889)

Sir Jervoise Clarke-Jervoise, 2nd Baronet (28 April 1804 – 1 April 1889) was a British Liberal Party politician.

Clarke Jervoise was the son of Rev. Samuel Clarke, who assumed the surname of Jervois in 1808 and was made a baronet in 1813.

He was elected at the 1857 general election as a Member of Parliament (MP) for South Hampshire, and held the seat until he stood down from the House of Commons at the 1868 general election.

In 1829, Clarke-Jervoise married Georgiana Thompson, the daughter of George Nesbit Thompson, Esquire, of Chapel Street, Grosvenor Place, London. The couple lived at Idsworth Park, Hampshire, England. They had two sons and three daughters.

Clarke-Jervoise's daughter Teresa married John Delaware Lewis, MP for Devonport. Another daughter, Janet, married James Small, Laird of Dirnanean in Perthshire, Scotland.

Clarke-Jervoise's eldest son, Major Jervoise Clarke-Jervoise, died 22 April 1872. Jervoise's son Arthur succeeded in the baronetcy.

Parliament of the United Kingdom
| Preceded by Henry Combe Compton; Lord Henry Cholmondeley | Member of Parliament for South Hampshire; 1857–1868; With: Hon. Ralph Dutton 1857–1865; Henry Hamlyn-Fane 1865–1868 | Succeeded by Hon. William Cowpe; Lord Henry Douglas-Scott-Montagu |
Baronetage of the United Kingdom
| Preceded by Samuel Jervoise | Baronet (of Idsworth, Hampshire); 1852–1889 | Succeeded by Arthur Henry Clarke-Jervoise |
