= Viscount Bertie of Thame =

Title in the Peerage of the United Kingdom

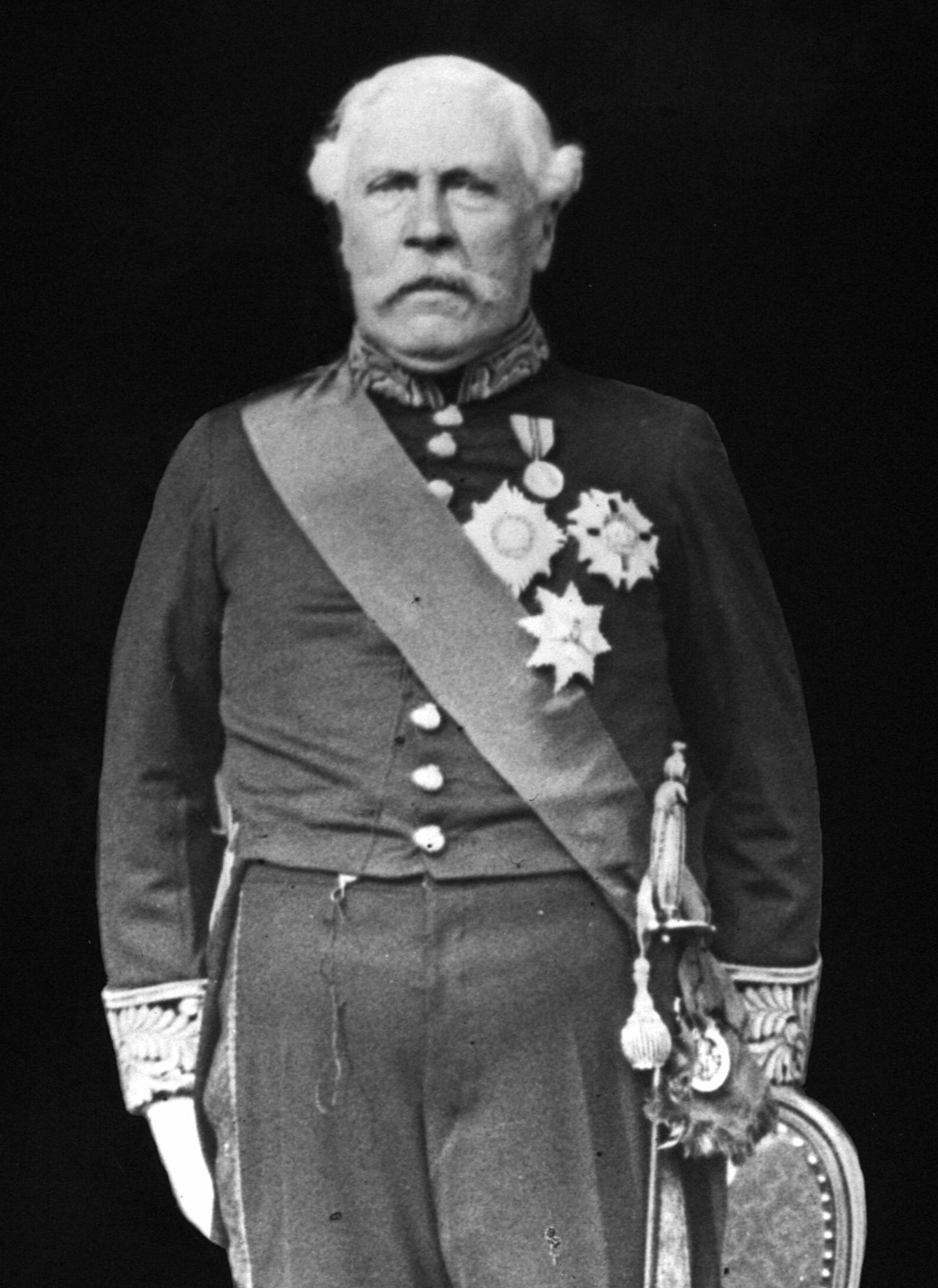
The 1st Viscount Bertie of Thame.

Viscount Bertie of Thame, in the County of Oxford, was a title in the Peerage of the United Kingdom. It was created in 1918 for the prominent diplomat Francis Bertie, 1st Baron Bertie of Thame, on his retirement as British Ambassador to France. He had already been created Baron Bertie of Thame, in the County of Oxford, in 1915, also in the Peerage of the United Kingdom. Bertie was the second son of Montagu Bertie, 6th Earl of Abingdon (see Earl of Abingdon for earlier history of the family). Both titles became extinct on the death of his son, the second Viscount, in 1954.

The titles are pronounced barty of tame.

== Viscounts Bertie of Thame (1918) ==
- Francis Leveson Bertie, 1st Viscount Bertie of Thame (1844–1919)
- Vere Frederick Bertie, 2nd Viscount Bertie of Thame (1878–1954)

== Family tree ==
Peerage family tree of: Abingdon, Ancaster, Ancaster and Kesteven, Bertie of Thame, Gwydyr, Lindsey, Norreys, Thame, and Willoughby

Baron Willoughby, 1313
Robert de Willoughby; 1260–1317; 1st Baron Willoughby
John de Willoughby; 1304–1349; 2nd Baron Willoughby
suffix de Eresby added, c. 1350–1360
John de Willoughby; 1329–1372; 3rd Baron Willoughby de Eresby	John (de) Welles; 1334–1361; 4th Baron Welles
Robert Willoughby; 1349–1396; 4th Baron Willoughby de Eresby	John Welles; 1352–1421; 5th Baron Welles
William Willoughby c. 1370–1409; 5th Baron Willoughby de Eresby	Eudes (or Eudo) Welles; 1387–1417
Robert Willoughby c. 1385–1452; 6th Baron Willoughby de Eresby	Thomas Willoughby	Lionel (de) Welles c. 1406–1461; 6th Baron Welles	Margaret Beauchamp c. 1410 – c. 1482
Joan Willoughby c. 1425–bef. 1462; 7th Baroness Willoughby de Eresby	Richard Welles c. 1428–1470; 7th Baron Welles	Robert Willoughby d. 1465	Cecily Welles	Edward IV; 1442–1483	Margaret Beaufort; 1443–1509
Barony of Welles (1st creation) attainted, 1470
Baron Welles (2nd creation), 1483	Viscount Welles, 1486
Robert Welles d. 1470; 8th Baron Willoughby de Eresby	Joan Welles d. bef. 1475; 9th Baron Willoughby de Eresby	Richard Hastings d. 1503; Baron Welles	Christopher Willoughby; 1453–1498/1499; 10th Baron Willoughby de Eresby	John Welles c. 1450–1498; 1st Viscount Welles	Cecily of York; 1469–1507	Elizabeth of York; 1466–1503	Henry VII of England; 1457–1509
Barony of Welles (2nd creation) possibly extinct, 1503	Viscountcy of Welles extinct, 1498
William Willoughby; 1482–1526; 11th Baron Willoughby de Eresby	Charles Brandon c. 1484–1545; 1st Duke of Suffolk	Mary Tudor; 1496–1533	Louis XII of France; 1462–1515	Henry VIII of England; 1491–1547
Baron Norreys of Rycote, 1572
Henry Norris (c. 1530–1601); 1st Baron Norreys	Richard Bertie; 1516–1582	Katherine Brandon; 1519–1580; 12th Baroness Willoughby de Eresby	Frances Grey; 1517–1559
William Norreys (1552–1579)	Peregrine Bertie; 1555–1601; 13th Baron Willoughby de Eresby	Lady Jane Grey; 1536/1537–1554
Earl of Berkshire and Viscount Thame, 1621	Earl of Lindsey, 1626
Francis Norris; 1582–1624; Earl of Berkshire and Viscount Thame, 2nd Baron Norreys	Robert Bertie; 1582–1642; 1st Earl of Lindsey, 14th Baron Willoughby de Eresby
Earldom of Berkshire and Viscountcy of Thame extinct, 1624
Elizabeth Wray d. 1645; 3rd Baroness Norreys
Bridget Bertie; 1627–1657; 4th Baroness Norreys	Montagu Bertie; 1608–1666; 2nd Earl of Lindsey, 15th Baron Willoughby de Eresby	Martha Cockayne
Earl of Abingdon, 1682
James Bertie; 1653–1669; 1st Earl of Abingdon, 5th Baron Norreys	Robert Bertie; 1630–1701; 3rd Earl of Lindsey, 16th Baron Willoughby de Eresby	Charles Bertie c. 1640 – c. 1710
Duke of Ancaster and Kesteven and Marquess of Lindsey, 1706
Montagu Venables-Bertie; 1673–1743; 2nd Earl of Abingdon, 6th Baron Norreys	James Bertie; 1674–1735	Robert Bertie; 1660–1723; 1st Duke of Ancaster and Kesteven and Marquess of Lindsey, 4th Earl of Lindsey, 17th Baron Willoughby de Eresby	Charles Bertie c. 1678–1730
Willoughby Bertie; 1692–1760; 3rd Earl of Abingdon, 7th Baron Norreys	Peregrine Bertie; 1686–1742; 2nd Duke of Ancaster and Kesteven and Marquess of Lindsey, 5th Earl of Lindsey, 18th Baron Willoughby de Eresby
Peregrine Bertie; 1714–1778; 3rd Duke of Ancaster and Kesteven and Marquess of Lindsey, 6th Earl of Lindsey, 19th Baron Willoughby de Eresby	Brownlow Bertie; 1729–1809; 5rd Duke of Ancaster and Kesteven and Marquess of Lindsey, 8th Earl of Lindsey	Peregrine Bertie c. 1709 – c. 1779
Baron Gwydyr, 1796	Dukedom of Ancaster and Kesteven and Marquessate of Lindsey extinct, 1809
Willoughby Bertie; 1740–1799; 4th Earl of Abingdon, 8th Baron Norreys	Robert Bertie; 1756–1779; 4th Duke of Ancaster and Kesteven and Marquess of Lindsey, 7th Earl of Lindsey, 20th Baron Willoughby de Eresby	Priscilla Bertie; 1761–1828; 21st Baroness Willoughby de Eresby	Peter Burrell; 1754–1820; 1st Baron Gwydyr	Albemarle Bertie; 1744–1818; 9th Earl of Lindsey
Montagu Bertie; 1784–1854; 5th Earl of Abingdon, 9th Baron Norreys	Peter Drummond-Burrell; 1782–1865; 22nd Baron Willoughby de Eresby, 2nd Baron Gwydyr	Lindsey Merrik Peter Burrell
Baron Aveland, 1856
Montagu Bertie; 1808–1884; 6th Earl of Abingdon, 10th Baron Norreys	Gilbert Heathcote; 1794–1867; 1st Baron Aveland	Clementina Drummond-Willoughby; 1809–1888; 24th Baron Willoughby de Eresby	Albyric Drummond-Willoughby; 1821–1870; 23rd Baron Willoughby de Eresby, 3rd Baron Gwydyr	Peter Robert Burrell; 1810–1909; 4th Baron Gwydyr	George Augustus Frederick Albemarle Bertie; 1814–1877; 10th Earl of Lindsey	Montague Peregrine Bertie; 1815–1899; 11th Earl of Lindsey
Baron Bertie of Thame, 1915; Viscount Bertie of Thame, 1918	Earl of Ancaster, 1892
Montagu Arthur Bertie; 1836–1928; 7th Earl of Abingdon	Viscount Bertie of Thame; 1844–1919; 1st Viscount Bertie of Thame and Baron Bertie of Thame	Gilbert Heathcote-Drummond-Willoughby; 1830–1910; 1st Earl of Ancaster, 25th Baron Willoughby de Eresby, 2nd Baron Aveland	Willoughby Merrik Campbell Burrell; 1841–1915; 5th Baron Gwydyr
Barony of Gwydyr extinct, 1915
Montagu Charles Francis Bertie; 1860–1919	Vere Frederick Bertie; 1878–1954; 2nd Viscount Bertie of Thame and Baron Bertie of Thame	Gilbert Heathcote-Drummond-Willoughby; 1867–1951; 2nd Earl of Ancaster, 26th Baron Willoughby de Eresby, 3rd Baron Aveland	Montague Peregrine Albemarle Bertie; 1861–1938; 12th Earl of Lindsey
Viscountcy and Barony of Bertie of Thame extinct, 1954
Montagu Henry Edmund Cecil Towneley-Bertie; 1887–1963; 13th Earl of Lindsey, 8th Earl of Abingdon	Arthur Michael Cosmo Bertie; 1886–c. 1954–1957	Gilbert James Heathcote-Drummond-Willoughby; 1907–1983; 3rd Earl of Ancaster, 27th Baron Willoughby de Eresby, 4th Baron Aveland
Earldom of Ancaster and Barony of Aveland extinct, 1983
Richard Henry Rupert Bertie b. 1931; 14th Earl of Lindsey, 9th Earl of Abingdon	Nancy Jane Marie Heathcote-Drummond-Willoughby b. 1934; 28th Baroness Willoughby de Eresby

== Arms ==
Coat of arms of Viscount Bertie of Thame
Crest A Saracen's head affrontee couped at the shoulders Proper ducally crowned Or and charged on the chest with a fret Azure. Escutcheon Argent three battering-rams fessewise in pale Proper armed and garnished Azure. Supporters Dexter a friar vested in russet grey with a crutch and rosary all Proper, sinister a savage Proper wreathed about the temples and waist with leaves Vert, and each charged on the breast with a fret Azure a crescent for difference. Motto Virtus Ariete Fortior (Valour Is Stronger Than A Battering Ram)

== See also ==
- Earl of Abingdon
- Earl of Lindsey
