= Earl of Abingdon =

Title in the Peerage of England

Earldom of Abingdon held with Earldom of Lindsey
- Arms of Bertie, Earls of Lindsey and Abingdon: Argent, three battering rams, barwise in pale proper, armed and garnished azure
- Creation date: 1682
- Created by: Charles II
- Peerage: Peerage of England
- First holder: James Bertie, 1st Earl of Abingdon
- Present holder: Richard Bertie, 14th Earl of Lindsey, 9th Earl of Abingdon
- Heir apparent: Henry Bertie, Baron Norreys
- Subsidiary titles: Baron Norreys
- Seat: Gilmilnscroft House
- Motto: Loyaltée me oblige (Loyalty binds me)

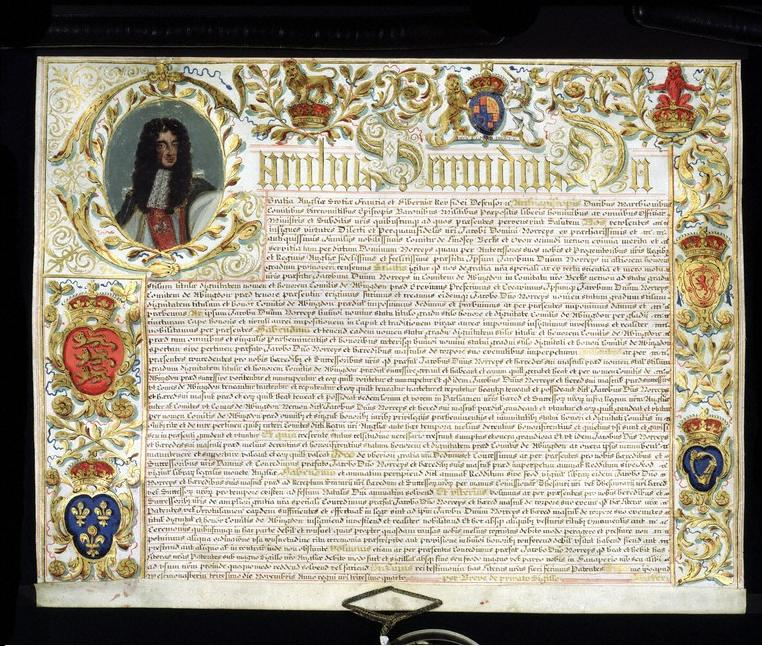
The Grant of deed of Arms of Earl of Abingdon, 1682 V&A Museum nos. W.25:1 to 3-1987

Earl of Abingdon is a title in the Peerage of England. It was created on 30 November 1682 for James Bertie, 5th Baron Norreys of Rycote. He was the eldest son of Montagu Bertie, 2nd Earl of Lindsey, by his second marriage to Bridget, 4th Baroness Norreys de Rycote, and the younger half-brother of Robert Bertie, 3rd Earl of Lindsey (see the Earl of Lindsey and the Baron Willoughby de Eresby for earlier history of the Bertie family). Bridget's family descended from Sir Henry Norris, who represented Berkshire and Oxfordshire in the House of Commons and served as Ambassador to France. In 1572, Sir Henry was summoned by writ to Parliament as Lord Norreys de Rycote. He was succeeded by his grandson, the second Baron. In 1621, he was created Viscount Thame and Earl of Berkshire in the Peerage of England. He had no sons, and on his death in 1624 the viscountcy and earldom became extinct. He was succeeded in the barony by his daughter Elizabeth, the third holder of the title. On her death, the title passed to her daughter, the aforementioned Bridget, the fourth Baroness, and second wife of the second Earl of Lindsey.

Her son James, the aforementioned fifth Baron, was summoned to the House of Lords as Lord Norreys of Rycote (with the precedence of 1572) on 13 April 1675. He was later Lord Lieutenant of Oxfordshire and in 1682 he was honoured when he was made Earl of Abingdon. He was succeeded by his son, the second Earl. He sat as Member of Parliament for Berkshire and Oxfordshire and served as Lord Lieutenant of Berkshire and Oxfordshire. In 1687, Lord Abingdon assumed by Royal licence the additional surname of Venables, which was that of his father-in-law. He died without surviving male issue and was succeeded by his nephew, the third Earl. He was the son of the Hon. James Bertie, second son of the first Earl. His grandson, the fifth Earl, was Lord Lieutenant of Berkshire. His son, the sixth Earl, represented Oxford and Abingdon in the House of Commons and served as Lord Lieutenant of Berkshire. His great-grandson, the eighth Earl (the son of Montagu Charles Francis Towneley-Bertie, Lord Norreys, who had assumed by Royal licence his maternal grandfather's surname of Towneley in 1896), succeeded his distant relative (his fifth cousin thrice removed) the twelfth Earl of Lindsey in the earldom of Lindsey in 1938. However, it was not until 1951 that he was recognised as Earl of Lindsey.

Another member of the Bertie family was the Hon. Francis Bertie, the second son of the sixth Earl of Abingdon. He served as British Ambassador to Italy and France and was created Viscount Bertie of Thame in 1918.

== Barons Norreys of Rycote (1572) ==
- Henry Norris, 1st Baron Norreys of Rycote (c. 1530–1601)
- Francis Norris, 1st Earl of Berkshire, 2nd Baron Norreys of Rycote (1582–1624)
- Elizabeth Wray, 3rd Baroness Norreys of Rycote (d. 1645)
- Bridget (née Wray) Bertie, 4th Baroness Norreys of Rycote (1627–1657)
- James Bertie, 5th Baron Norreys of Rycote (1653–1699) (created Earl of Abingdon in 1682)

== Earls of Abingdon (1682) ==
- James Bertie, 1st Earl of Abingdon (1653–1699)
- Montagu Venables-Bertie, 2nd Earl of Abingdon (1673–1743)
- Willoughby Bertie, 3rd Earl of Abingdon (1692–1760)
- Willoughby Bertie, 4th Earl of Abingdon (1740–1799)
- Montagu Bertie, 5th Earl of Abingdon (1784–1854)
- Montagu Bertie, 6th Earl of Abingdon (1808–1884)
- Montagu Arthur Bertie, 7th Earl of Abingdon (1836–1928)
- Montagu Henry Edmund Towneley-Bertie, 8th Earl of Abingdon (1887–1963) (succeeded as 13th Earl of Lindsey in 1938)
- Richard Henry Rupert Bertie, 14th Earl of Lindsey, 9th Earl of Abingdon (b. 1931)

The heir apparent is the present holder's son Henry Mark Willoughby Bertie, Lord Norreys (b. 1958).
The heir apparent's heir apparent is his son Hon. Willoughby Henry Constantine St Maur Bertie (b. 1996).

The Abingdon Arms in central Oxford was named after the Earl of Abingdon, who owned the site.

Line of succession (simplified)
- Montagu Bertie, 6th Earl of Abingdon (1808–1884)
  - Montagu Bertie, 7th Earl of Abingdon (1836–1928)
    - Montagu Charles Francis Towneley-Bertie, Lord Norreys (1860–1919)
      - Montagu Towneley-Bertie, 13th Earl of Lindsey, 8th Earl of Abingdon (1887–1963)
    - Hon. Arthur Michael Cosmo Bertie (1886–1957)
      - Richard Bertie, 14th Earl of Lindsey, 9th Earl of Abingdon (born 1931)
        - (1). Henry Mark Willoughby Bertie, Lord Norreys (born 1958)
          - (2). Hon. Willoughby Henry Constantine St Maur Bertie (born 1996)
          - (3). Hon. James Frederick Christopher Ninian Bertie (born 1997)
        - (4). Hon. Alexander Michael Richard Bertie (born 1970)
          - (5). Fergus Bertie (born 2000)
    - Hon. James Willoughby Bertie (1901–1966)
      - male issue and descendants in remainder
  - Hon. Alberic Edward Bertie (1846–1928)
    - Aubrey Charles Bertie (1882–1944)
      - Albert Arnaud Bertie (1919–2002)
        - male issue in remainder

== Family tree ==
Peerage family tree of: Abingdon, Ancaster, Ancaster and Kesteven, Bertie of Thame, Gwydyr, Lindsey, Norreys, Thame, and Willoughby

Baron Willoughby, 1313
Robert de Willoughby; 1260–1317; 1st Baron Willoughby
John de Willoughby; 1304–1349; 2nd Baron Willoughby
suffix de Eresby added, c. 1350–1360
John de Willoughby; 1329–1372; 3rd Baron Willoughby de Eresby	John (de) Welles; 1334–1361; 4th Baron Welles
Robert Willoughby; 1349–1396; 4th Baron Willoughby de Eresby	John Welles; 1352–1421; 5th Baron Welles
William Willoughby c. 1370–1409; 5th Baron Willoughby de Eresby	Eudes (or Eudo) Welles; 1387–1417
Robert Willoughby c. 1385–1452; 6th Baron Willoughby de Eresby	Thomas Willoughby	Lionel (de) Welles c. 1406–1461; 6th Baron Welles	Margaret Beauchamp c. 1410 – c. 1482
Joan Willoughby c. 1425–bef. 1462; 7th Baroness Willoughby de Eresby	Richard Welles c. 1428–1470; 7th Baron Welles	Robert Willoughby d. 1465	Cecily Welles	King Edward IV; 1442–1483	Margaret Beaufort; 1443–1509
Barony of Welles (1st creation) attainted, 1470
Baron Welles (2nd creation), 1483	Viscount Welles, 1486
Robert Welles d. 1470; 8th Baron Willoughby de Eresby	Joan Welles d. bef. 1475; 9th Baron Willoughby de Eresby	Richard Hastings d. 1503; Baron Welles	Christopher Willoughby; 1453–1498/1499; 10th Baron Willoughby de Eresby	John Welles c. 1450–1498; 1st Viscount Welles	Cecily of York; 1469–1507	Elizabeth of York; 1466–1503	King Henry VII; 1457–1509
Barony of Welles (2nd creation) possibly extinct, 1503	Viscountcy of Welles extinct, 1498
William Willoughby; 1482–1526; 11th Baron Willoughby de Eresby	Charles Brandon c. 1484–1545; 1st Duke of Suffolk	Mary Tudor; 1496–1533	Louis XII of France; 1462–1515	King Henry VIII; 1491–1547
Baron Norreys of Rycote, 1572
Henry Norris (c. 1530–1601); 1st Baron Norreys	Richard Bertie; 1516–1582	Katherine Brandon; 1519–1580; 12th Baroness Willoughby de Eresby	Frances Grey; 1517–1559
William Norreys (1552–1579)	Peregrine Bertie; 1555–1601; 13th Baron Willoughby de Eresby	Lady Jane Grey; 1536/1537–1554
Earl of Berkshire and Viscount Thame, 1621	Earl of Lindsey, 1626
Francis Norris; 1582–1624; Earl of Berkshire, etc., 2nd Baron Norreys	Robert Bertie; 1582–1642; 1st Earl of Lindsey, 14th Baron Willoughby de Eresby
Earldom of Berkshire and Viscountcy of Thame extinct, 1624
Elizabeth Wray d. 1645; 3rd Baroness Norreys
Bridget Bertie; 1627–1657; 4th Baroness Norreys	Montagu Bertie; 1608–1666; 2nd Earl of Lindsey, 15th Baron Willoughby de Eresby	Martha Cockayne
Earl of Abingdon, 1682
James Bertie; 1653–1669; 1st Earl of Abingdon, 5th Baron Norreys	Robert Bertie; 1630–1701; 3rd Earl of Lindsey, 16th Baron Willoughby de Eresby	Charles Bertie c. 1640 – c. 1710
Duke of Ancaster and Kesteven and Marquess of Lindsey, 1706
Montagu Venables-Bertie; 1673–1743; 2nd Earl of Abingdon, 6th Baron Norreys	James Bertie; 1674–1735	Robert Bertie; 1660–1723; 1st Duke of Ancaster and Kesteven, etc., 4th Earl of Lindsey, 17th Baron Willoughby de Eresby	Charles Bertie c. 1678–1730
Willoughby Bertie; 1692–1760; 3rd Earl of Abingdon, 7th Baron Norreys	Peregrine Bertie; 1686–1742; 2nd Duke of Ancaster and Kesteven, etc., 5th Earl of Lindsey, 18th Baron Willoughby de Eresby
Peregrine Bertie; 1714–1778; 3rd Duke of Ancaster and Kesteven, etc., 6th Earl of Lindsey, 19th Baron Willoughby de Eresby	Brownlow Bertie; 1729–1809; 5rd Duke of Ancaster and Kesteven, etc., 8th Earl of Lindsey	Peregrine Bertie c. 1709 – c. 1779
Baron Gwydyr, 1796	Dukedom of Ancaster and Kesteven and Marquessate of Lindsey extinct, 1809
Willoughby Bertie; 1740–1799; 4th Earl of Abingdon, 8th Baron Norreys	Robert Bertie; 1756–1779; 4th Duke of Ancaster and Kesteven, etc., 7th Earl of Lindsey, 20th Baron Willoughby de Eresby	Priscilla Bertie; 1761–1828; 21st Baroness Willoughby de Eresby	Peter Burrell; 1754–1820; 1st Baron Gwydyr	Albemarle Bertie; 1744–1818; 9th Earl of Lindsey
Montagu Bertie; 1784–1854; 5th Earl of Abingdon, 9th Baron Norreys	Peter Drummond-Burrell; 1782–1865; 22nd Baron Willoughby de Eresby, 2nd Baron Gwydyr	Lindsey Merrik Peter Burrell
Baron Aveland, 1856
Montagu Bertie; 1808–1884; 6th Earl of Abingdon, 10th Baron Norreys	Gilbert Heathcote; 1794–1867; 1st Baron Aveland	Clementina Drummond-Willoughby; 1809–1888; 24th Baron Willoughby de Eresby	Albyric Drummond-Willoughby; 1821–1870; 23rd Baron Willoughby de Eresby, 3rd Baron Gwydyr	Peter Robert Burrell; 1810–1909; 4th Baron Gwydyr	George Augustus Frederick Albemarle Bertie; 1814–1877; 10th Earl of Lindsey	Montague Peregrine Bertie; 1815–1899; 11th Earl of Lindsey
Baron Bertie of Thame, 1915; Viscount Bertie of Thame, 1918	Earl of Ancaster, 1892
Montagu Arthur Bertie; 1836–1928; 7th Earl of Abingdon	Viscount Bertie of Thame; 1844–1919; 1st Viscount Bertie of Thame, etc.	Gilbert Heathcote-Drummond-Willoughby; 1830–1910; 1st Earl of Ancaster, 25th Baron Willoughby de Eresby, 2nd Baron Aveland	Willoughby Merrik Campbell Burrell; 1841–1915; 5th Baron Gwydyr
Barony of Gwydyr extinct, 1915
Montagu Charles Francis Bertie; 1860–1919	Vere Frederick Bertie; 1878–1954; 2nd Viscount Bertie of Thame, etc.	Gilbert Heathcote-Drummond-Willoughby; 1867–1951; 2nd Earl of Ancaster, 26th Baron Willoughby de Eresby, 3rd Baron Aveland	Montague Peregrine Albemarle Bertie; 1861–1938; 12th Earl of Lindsey
Viscountcy and Barony of Bertie of Thame extinct, 1954
Montagu Henry Edmund Cecil Towneley-Bertie; 1887–1963; 13th Earl of Lindsey, 8th Earl of Abingdon	Arthur Michael Cosmo Bertie; 1886–c. 1954–1957	Gilbert James Heathcote-Drummond-Willoughby; 1907–1983; 3rd Earl of Ancaster, 27th Baron Willoughby de Eresby, 4th Baron Aveland
Earldom of Ancaster and Barony of Aveland extinct, 1983
Richard Henry Rupert Bertie b. 1931; 14th Earl of Lindsey, 9th Earl of Abingdon	Nancy Jane Marie Heathcote-Drummond-Willoughby b. 1934; 28th Baroness Willoughby de Eresby

== Arms ==
Coat of arms of the Earl of Abingdon
Crest A Saracen's Head affronté couped at the shoulders proper ducally crowned Or and charged on the chest with a Fret Azure. Escutcheon Argent three Battering Rams fesswise in pale proper beaded armed and garnished Azure. Supporters On the Dexter a Friar habited in russet-grey with a Crutch and Rosary all proper and charged on the breast with a Fret Azure, and on the Sinister a Savage proper wreathed about the temples and waist with Oak Leaves Vert and likewise charged on the breast with a Fret Azure. Motto Virtus Ariete Fortior (Valour is stronger than a battering ram).

== See also ==
- Earl of Lindsey
- Baron Willoughby de Eresby
- Viscount Bertie of Thame
- Andrew Bertie
