= Earl of Lindsey =

Title in the Peerage of England

Earldom of Lindsey held with Earldom of Abingdon
- Arms of Bertie, Earls of Lindsey: Argent, three battering rams, barwise in pale proper, armed and garnished azure
- Creation date: 1626
- Created by: Charles I
- Peerage: Peerage of England
- First holder: Robert Bertie, 1st Earl of Lindsey
- Present holder: Richard Bertie, 14th Earl of Lindsey, 9th Earl of Abingdon
- Heir apparent: Henry Bertie, Baron Norreys
- Subsidiary titles: Baron Norreys
- Seat: Gilmilnscroft House
- Motto: Loyalteé me oblige (Loyalty binds me)

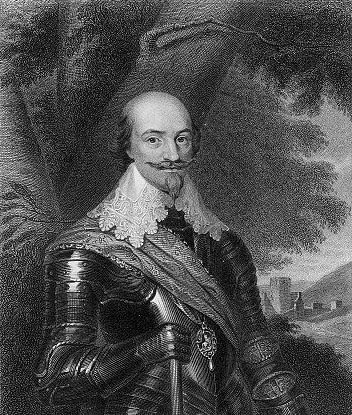
Robert Bertie, 1st Earl of Lindsey.

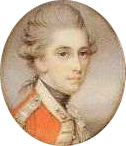
Robert Bertie The 4th Duke of Ancaster.

Earl of Lindsey is a title in the Peerage of England. It was created in 1626 for the 14th Baron Willoughby de Eresby. He was First Lord of the Admiralty from 1635 to 1636 and also established his claim in right of his mother to the hereditary office of Lord Great Chamberlain of England. Lord Lindsey fought on the Royalist side in the Civil War and was mortally wounded at the Battle of Edgehill on 23 October 1642. He was succeeded by his son, the second earl. He also fought at Edgehill and surrendered to the Parliamentarians in order to attend his mortally wounded father. Lord Lindsey later fought at the First Battle of Newbury, Second Battle of Newbury, and at Naseby. His son from his second marriage, James, was created Earl of Abingdon in 1682. He was succeeded by his son from his first marriage to Martha Cockayne, the third Earl. He represented Boston in the House of Commons and served as Lord Lieutenant of Lincolnshire.

His son, the fourth earl, was summoned to the House of Lords in 1690 through a writ of acceleration in his father's junior title of Baron Willoughby de Eresby. He later served as Chancellor of the Duchy of Lancaster and as Lord Lieutenant of Lincolnshire and was one of the Lords Justice before the arrival of King George I. In 1706 he was created Marquess of Lindsey and in 1715 he was further honoured when he was made Duke of Ancaster and Kesteven. Both titles were in the Peerage of Great Britain. His son, the second duke, was called to the House of Lords in 1715 through a writ of acceleration as Baron Willoughby de Eresby. He later served as Lord Lieutenant of Lincolnshire. He was succeeded by his son, the third duke. He was a general in the Army and served as Master of the Horse from 1766 to 1778. He was also Lord Lieutenant of Lincolnshire. His son, the fourth duke, was briefly Lord Lieutenant of Lincolnshire but died unmarried in 1779 at an early age. On his death the barony of Willoughby de Eresby fell into abeyance between his sisters Lady Priscilla and Georgiana, Marchioness of Cholmondeley, who also jointly inherited the office of Lord Great Chamberlain (the abeyance was terminated in 1780 in favour of Priscilla; see the Baron Willoughby de Eresby for later history of this title).

The late Duke was succeeded in the earldom, marquessate and dukedom by his uncle, the fifth duke. He represented Lincoln in Parliament and served as Lord Lieutenant of Lincolnshire. He had no sons and on his death in 1809 the marquessate and dukedom became extinct. He was succeeded in the earldom of Lindsey by his third cousin, the ninth earl. He was the great-grandson of the Hon. Charles Bertie, fifth son of the second earl. Lord Lindsey was a general in the Army and also sat as Member of Parliament for Stamford. On the death in 1938 of his grandson, the twelfth earl, the line of the fifth son of the second earl failed. The late earl was succeeded by his distant relative (his fifth cousin thrice removed) the eighth Earl of Abingdon, who became the thirteenth earl. However, it was not until 1951 the Lord Abingdon was recognised in the earldom of Lindsey. As of 2017 the title is held by his first cousin, the fourteenth Earl of Lindsey and ninth Earl of Abingdon.

The family seat is at Gilmilnscroft House, near Mauchline, in East Ayrshire.

== Earls of Lindsey (1626) ==
Coat of arms of Bertie, the Earls of Lindsey

- Robert Bertie (1582–1642), 1st Earl of Lindsey
- Montagu Bertie (1608–1666), 2nd Earl of Lindsey
- Robert Bertie (1630–1701), 3rd Earl of Lindsey
- Robert Bertie (1660–1723), 4th Earl of Lindsey (created Marquess of Lindsey in 1706 and Duke of Ancaster and Kesteven in 1715)

== Dukes of Ancaster and Kesteven (1715) ==
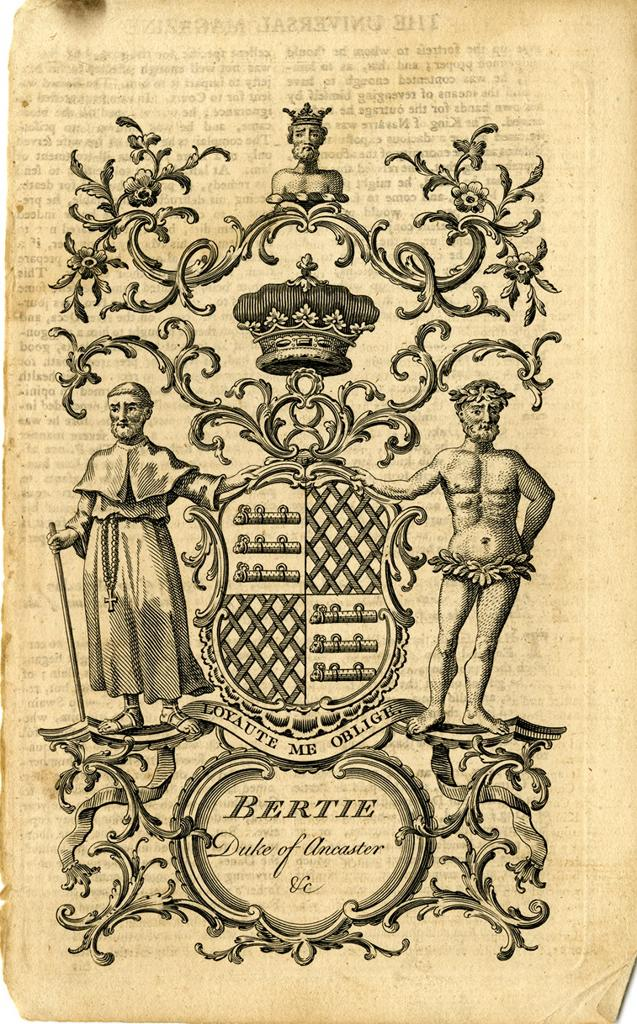
A bookplate showing the coat of arms for Bertie, Duke of Ancaster

- Robert Bertie (1660–1723), 1st Duke of Ancaster and Kesteven and Marquess of Lindsey, 4th Earl of Lindsey
- Peregrine Bertie (1686–1742), 2nd Duke of Ancaster and Kesteven and Marquess of Lindsey, 5th Earl of Lindsey
- Peregrine Bertie (1714–1778), 3rd Duke of Ancaster and Kesteven and Marquess of Lindsey, 6th Earl of Lindsey
- Robert Bertie (1756–1779), 4th Duke of Ancaster and Kesteven and Marquess of Lindsey, 7th Earl of Lindsey
- Brownlow Bertie (1729–1809), 5th Duke of Ancaster and Kesteven and Marquess of Lindsey, 8th Earl of Lindsey

== Earls of Lindsey (1626; Reverted) ==
- Albemarle Bertie (1744–1818), 9th Earl of Lindsey
- George Augustus Frederick Albemarle Bertie (1814–1877), 10th Earl of Lindsey
- Montague Peregrine Bertie (1815–1899), 11th Earl of Lindsey
- Montague Peregrine Albemarle Bertie (1861–1938), 12th Earl of Lindsey
- Montagu Henry Edmund Towneley-Bertie (1887–1963), 13th Earl of Lindsey, 8th Earl of Abingdon
- Richard Henry Rupert Bertie (b. 1931), 14th Earl of Lindsey, 9th Earl of Abingdon

The heir apparent is the present holder's son Henry Mark Willoughby Bertie, Lord Norreys (b. 1958).
The heir apparent's heir apparent is his son Hon. Willoughby Henry Constantine St. Maur Bertie (b. 1996).

Line of succession (simplified)
- Montagu Bertie, 6th Earl of Abingdon (1808–1884)
  - Montagu Bertie, 7th Earl of Abingdon (1836–1928)
    - Montagu Charles Francis Towneley-Bertie, Lord Norreys (1860–1919)
      - Montagu Towneley-Bertie, 13th Earl of Lindsey, 8th Earl of Abingdon (1887–1963)
    - Hon. Arthur Michael Cosmo Bertie (1886–1957)
      - Richard Bertie, 14th Earl of Lindsey, 9th Earl of Abingdon (b. 1931)
        - (1). Henry Mark Willoughby Bertie, Lord Norreys (b. 1958)
          - (2). Hon. Willoughby Henry Constantine St Maur Bertie (b. 1996)
          - (3). Hon. James Frederick Christopher Ninian Bertie (b. 1997)
        - (4). Hon. Alexander Michael Richard Bertie (b. 1970)
          - (5). Fergus Bertie (b. 2000)
    - Hon. James Willoughby Bertie (1901–1966)
      - male issue and descendants in remainder
  - Hon. Alberic Edward Bertie (1846–1928)
    - Aubrey Charles Bertie (1882–1944)
      - Albert Arnaud Bertie (1919–2002)
        - male issue in remainder

== Family tree ==
Peerage family tree of: Abingdon, Ancaster, Ancaster and Kesteven, Bertie of Thame, Gwydyr, Lindsey, Norreys, Thame, and Willoughby

Baron Willoughby, 1313
Robert de Willoughby; 1260–1317; 1st Baron Willoughby
John de Willoughby; 1304–1349; 2nd Baron Willoughby
suffix de Eresby added, c. 1350–1360
John de Willoughby; 1329–1372; 3rd Baron Willoughby de Eresby	John (de) Welles; 1334–1361; 4th Baron Welles
Robert Willoughby; 1349–1396; 4th Baron Willoughby de Eresby	John Welles; 1352–1421; 5th Baron Welles
William Willoughby c. 1370–1409; 5th Baron Willoughby de Eresby	Eudes (or Eudo) Welles; 1387–1417
Robert Willoughby c. 1385–1452; 6th Baron Willoughby de Eresby	Thomas Willoughby	Lionel (de) Welles c. 1406–1461; 6th Baron Welles	Margaret Beauchamp c. 1410 – c. 1482
Joan Willoughby c. 1425–bef. 1462; 7th Baroness Willoughby de Eresby	Richard Welles c. 1428–1470; 7th Baron Welles	Robert Willoughby d. 1465	Cecily Welles	King Edward IV; 1442–1483	Margaret Beaufort; 1443–1509
Barony of Welles (1st creation) attainted, 1470
Baron Welles (2nd creation), 1483	Viscount Welles, 1486
Robert Welles d. 1470; 8th Baron Willoughby de Eresby	Joan Welles d. bef. 1475; 9th Baron Willoughby de Eresby	Richard Hastings d. 1503; Baron Welles	Christopher Willoughby; 1453–1498/1499; 10th Baron Willoughby de Eresby	John Welles c. 1450–1498; 1st Viscount Welles	Cecily of York; 1469–1507	Elizabeth of York; 1466–1503	King Henry VII; 1457–1509
Barony of Welles (2nd creation) possibly extinct, 1503	Viscountcy of Welles extinct, 1498
William Willoughby; 1482–1526; 11th Baron Willoughby de Eresby	Charles Brandon c. 1484–1545; 1st Duke of Suffolk	Mary Tudor; 1496–1533	Louis XII of France; 1462–1515	King Henry VIII; 1491–1547
Baron Norreys of Rycote, 1572
Henry Norris (c. 1530–1601); 1st Baron Norreys	Richard Bertie; 1516–1582	Katherine Brandon; 1519–1580; 12th Baroness Willoughby de Eresby	Frances Grey; 1517–1559
William Norreys (1552–1579)	Peregrine Bertie; 1555–1601; 13th Baron Willoughby de Eresby	Lady Jane Grey; 1536/1537–1554
Earl of Berkshire and Viscount Thame, 1621	Earl of Lindsey, 1626
Francis Norris; 1582–1624; Earl of Berkshire, etc., 2nd Baron Norreys	Robert Bertie; 1582–1642; 1st Earl of Lindsey, 14th Baron Willoughby de Eresby
Earldom of Berkshire and Viscountcy of Thame extinct, 1624
Elizabeth Wray d. 1645; 3rd Baroness Norreys
Bridget Bertie; 1627–1657; 4th Baroness Norreys	Montagu Bertie; 1608–1666; 2nd Earl of Lindsey, 15th Baron Willoughby de Eresby	Martha Cockayne
Earl of Abingdon, 1682
James Bertie; 1653–1669; 1st Earl of Abingdon, 5th Baron Norreys	Robert Bertie; 1630–1701; 3rd Earl of Lindsey, 16th Baron Willoughby de Eresby	Charles Bertie c. 1640 – c. 1710
Duke of Ancaster and Kesteven and Marquess of Lindsey, 1706
Montagu Venables-Bertie; 1673–1743; 2nd Earl of Abingdon, 6th Baron Norreys	James Bertie; 1674–1735	Robert Bertie; 1660–1723; 1st Duke of Ancaster and Kesteven, etc., 4th Earl of Lindsey, 17th Baron Willoughby de Eresby	Charles Bertie c. 1678–1730
Willoughby Bertie; 1692–1760; 3rd Earl of Abingdon, 7th Baron Norreys	Peregrine Bertie; 1686–1742; 2nd Duke of Ancaster and Kesteven, etc., 5th Earl of Lindsey, 18th Baron Willoughby de Eresby
Peregrine Bertie; 1714–1778; 3rd Duke of Ancaster and Kesteven, etc., 6th Earl of Lindsey, 19th Baron Willoughby de Eresby	Brownlow Bertie; 1729–1809; 5rd Duke of Ancaster and Kesteven, etc., 8th Earl of Lindsey	Peregrine Bertie c. 1709 – c. 1779
Baron Gwydyr, 1796	Dukedom of Ancaster and Kesteven and Marquessate of Lindsey extinct, 1809
Willoughby Bertie; 1740–1799; 4th Earl of Abingdon, 8th Baron Norreys	Robert Bertie; 1756–1779; 4th Duke of Ancaster and Kesteven, etc., 7th Earl of Lindsey, 20th Baron Willoughby de Eresby	Priscilla Bertie; 1761–1828; 21st Baroness Willoughby de Eresby	Peter Burrell; 1754–1820; 1st Baron Gwydyr	Albemarle Bertie; 1744–1818; 9th Earl of Lindsey
Montagu Bertie; 1784–1854; 5th Earl of Abingdon, 9th Baron Norreys	Peter Drummond-Burrell; 1782–1865; 22nd Baron Willoughby de Eresby, 2nd Baron Gwydyr	Lindsey Merrik Peter Burrell
Baron Aveland, 1856
Montagu Bertie; 1808–1884; 6th Earl of Abingdon, 10th Baron Norreys	Gilbert Heathcote; 1794–1867; 1st Baron Aveland	Clementina Drummond-Willoughby; 1809–1888; 24th Baron Willoughby de Eresby	Albyric Drummond-Willoughby; 1821–1870; 23rd Baron Willoughby de Eresby, 3rd Baron Gwydyr	Peter Robert Burrell; 1810–1909; 4th Baron Gwydyr	George Augustus Frederick Albemarle Bertie; 1814–1877; 10th Earl of Lindsey	Montague Peregrine Bertie; 1815–1899; 11th Earl of Lindsey
Baron Bertie of Thame, 1915; Viscount Bertie of Thame, 1918	Earl of Ancaster, 1892
Montagu Arthur Bertie; 1836–1928; 7th Earl of Abingdon	Viscount Bertie of Thame; 1844–1919; 1st Viscount Bertie of Thame, etc.	Gilbert Heathcote-Drummond-Willoughby; 1830–1910; 1st Earl of Ancaster, 25th Baron Willoughby de Eresby, 2nd Baron Aveland	Willoughby Merrik Campbell Burrell; 1841–1915; 5th Baron Gwydyr
Barony of Gwydyr extinct, 1915
Montagu Charles Francis Bertie; 1860–1919	Vere Frederick Bertie; 1878–1954; 2nd Viscount Bertie of Thame, etc.	Gilbert Heathcote-Drummond-Willoughby; 1867–1951; 2nd Earl of Ancaster, 26th Baron Willoughby de Eresby, 3rd Baron Aveland	Montague Peregrine Albemarle Bertie; 1861–1938; 12th Earl of Lindsey
Viscountcy and Barony of Bertie of Thame extinct, 1954
Montagu Henry Edmund Cecil Towneley-Bertie; 1887–1963; 13th Earl of Lindsey, 8th Earl of Abingdon	Arthur Michael Cosmo Bertie; 1886–c. 1954–1957	Gilbert James Heathcote-Drummond-Willoughby; 1907–1983; 3rd Earl of Ancaster, 27th Baron Willoughby de Eresby, 4th Baron Aveland
Earldom of Ancaster and Barony of Aveland extinct, 1983
Richard Henry Rupert Bertie b. 1931; 14th Earl of Lindsey, 9th Earl of Abingdon	Nancy Jane Marie Heathcote-Drummond-Willoughby b. 1934; 28th Baroness Willoughby de Eresby

== Arms ==
Coat of arms of the Earl of Lindsey
Crest A Saracen's Head affronté couped at the shoulders proper ducally crowned Or and charged on the chest with a Fret Azure. Escutcheon Argent three Battering Rams fesswise in pale proper beaded armed and garnished Azure. Supporters On the Dexter a Friar habited in russet-grey with a Crutch and Rosary all proper and charged on the breast with a Fret Azure, and on the Sinister a Savage proper wreathed about the temples and waist with Oak Leaves Vert and likewise charged on the breast with a Fret Azure. Motto Virtus Ariete Fortior (Valour is stronger than a battering ram).

== See also ==
- Earl of Ancaster
- Viscount Bertie of Thame
- Lady Charlotte Guest
