= Baron Gwydyr =

Barony in the Peerage of Great Britain

Baron Gwydyr, of Gwydyr in the County of Carnarvon, was a title in the Peerage of Great Britain. It was created on 16 June 1796 for Sir Peter Burrell, 2nd Baronet, who had earlier represented Boston and Haslemere in the House of Commons. The Burrell Baronetcy, of West Grinstead Park in the County of Sussex, had been created in the Baronetage of Great Britain on 5 July 1766 for his great-uncle Merrik Burrell, with remainder to the latter's nephew Peter Burrell (the father of Lord Gwydyr). Merrik Burrell had previously represented Marlow, Grampound, Haslemere and Great Bedwyn in Parliament. Lord Gwydyr married Priscilla Bertie, 21st Baroness Willoughby de Eresby, herself a descendant of the Aberffraw legacy through her grandmother Mary Wynn. They were both succeeded by their eldest son, Peter Drummond-Burrell, 22nd Baron Willoughby de Eresby. On the death in 1865 of his son, the two titles separated. The Barony of Willoughby de Eresby fell into abeyance between the late Baron's sisters (see the Baron Willoughby de Eresby for later history of this title) while the baronetcy and barony of Gwydyr were inherited by his cousin, the fourth Baron. He was the son of the Honourable Lindsey Merrik Peter Burrell, younger son of the first Baron. The baronetcy and barony became extinct on the death of his son, the fifth Baron, on 13 February 1915.

The first Baron Gwydyr was the nephew of Sir William Burrell, 2nd Baronet, from whom the Burrell baronets of Valentine Park are descended.

Gwydyr Mansions in Hove, East Sussex, were named after the 2nd Lord Gwydyr. He had been a friend of the Goldsmid family, upon whose land the development was built in 1890.

Gwydyr House in London was the town-house of the Barons, now hosts the Office of the Secretary of State for Wales

== Burrell baronets, of West Grinstead Park (1766) ==
- Sir Merrik Burrell, 1st Baronet (1699–1787)
- Sir Peter Burrell, 2nd Baronet (1754–1820) (created Baron Gwydyr in 1796)

== Barons Gwydyr (1796) ==
- Peter Burrell, 1st Baron Gwydyr (1754–1820)
- Peter Robert Drummond-Burrell, 2nd Baron Gwydyr, 22nd Baron Willoughby de Eresby (1782–1865)
- Albyric Drummond-Willoughby, 3rd Baron Gwydyr, 23rd Baron Willoughby de Eresby (1821–1870)
- Peter Robert Burrell, 4th Baron Gwydyr (1810–1909)
- Willoughby Merrik Campbell Burrell, 5th Baron Gwydyr (1841–1915)

== Family tree ==
Peerage family tree of: Abingdon, Ancaster, Ancaster and Kesteven, Bertie of Thame, Gwydyr, Lindsey, Norreys, Thame, and Willoughby

Baron Willoughby, 1313
Robert de Willoughby; 1260–1317; 1st Baron Willoughby
John de Willoughby; 1304–1349; 2nd Baron Willoughby
suffix de Eresby added, c. 1350–1360
John de Willoughby; 1329–1372; 3rd Baron Willoughby de Eresby	John (de) Welles; 1334–1361; 4th Baron Welles
Robert Willoughby; 1349–1396; 4th Baron Willoughby de Eresby	John Welles; 1352–1421; 5th Baron Welles
William Willoughby c. 1370–1409; 5th Baron Willoughby de Eresby	Eudes (or Eudo) Welles; 1387–1417
Robert Willoughby c. 1385–1452; 6th Baron Willoughby de Eresby	Thomas Willoughby	Lionel (de) Welles c. 1406–1461; 6th Baron Welles	Margaret Beauchamp c. 1410 – c. 1482
Joan Willoughby c. 1425–bef. 1462; 7th Baroness Willoughby de Eresby	Richard Welles c. 1428–1470; 7th Baron Welles	Robert Willoughby d. 1465	Cecily Welles	Edward IV; 1442–1483	Margaret Beaufort; 1443–1509
Barony of Welles (1st creation) attainted, 1470
Baron Welles (2nd creation), 1483	Viscount Welles, 1486
Robert Welles d. 1470; 8th Baron Willoughby de Eresby	Joan Welles d. bef. 1475; 9th Baron Willoughby de Eresby	Richard Hastings d. 1503; Baron Welles	Christopher Willoughby; 1453–1498/1499; 10th Baron Willoughby de Eresby	John Welles c. 1450–1498; 1st Viscount Welles	Cecily of York; 1469–1507	Elizabeth of York; 1466–1503	Henry VII of England; 1457–1509
Barony of Welles (2nd creation) possibly extinct, 1503	Viscountcy of Welles extinct, 1498
William Willoughby; 1482–1526; 11th Baron Willoughby de Eresby	Charles Brandon c. 1484–1545; 1st Duke of Suffolk	Mary Tudor; 1496–1533	Louis XII of France; 1462–1515	Henry VIII of England; 1491–1547
Baron Norreys of Rycote, 1572
Henry Norris (c. 1530–1601); 1st Baron Norreys	Richard Bertie; 1516–1582	Katherine Brandon; 1519–1580; 12th Baroness Willoughby de Eresby	Frances Grey; 1517–1559
William Norreys (1552–1579)	Peregrine Bertie; 1555–1601; 13th Baron Willoughby de Eresby	Lady Jane Grey; 1536/1537–1554
Earl of Berkshire and Viscount Thame, 1621	Earl of Lindsey, 1626
Francis Norris; 1582–1624; Earl of Berkshire and Viscount Thame, 2nd Baron Norreys	Robert Bertie; 1582–1642; 1st Earl of Lindsey, 14th Baron Willoughby de Eresby
Earldom of Berkshire and Viscountcy of Thame extinct, 1624
Elizabeth Wray d. 1645; 3rd Baroness Norreys
Bridget Bertie; 1627–1657; 4th Baroness Norreys	Montagu Bertie; 1608–1666; 2nd Earl of Lindsey, 15th Baron Willoughby de Eresby	Martha Cockayne
Earl of Abingdon, 1682
James Bertie; 1653–1669; 1st Earl of Abingdon, 5th Baron Norreys	Robert Bertie; 1630–1701; 3rd Earl of Lindsey, 16th Baron Willoughby de Eresby	Charles Bertie c. 1640 – c. 1710
Duke of Ancaster and Kesteven and Marquess of Lindsey, 1706
Montagu Venables-Bertie; 1673–1743; 2nd Earl of Abingdon, 6th Baron Norreys	James Bertie; 1674–1735	Robert Bertie; 1660–1723; 1st Duke of Ancaster and Kesteven and Marquess of Lindsey, 4th Earl of Lindsey, 17th Baron Willoughby de Eresby	Charles Bertie c. 1678–1730
Willoughby Bertie; 1692–1760; 3rd Earl of Abingdon, 7th Baron Norreys	Peregrine Bertie; 1686–1742; 2nd Duke of Ancaster and Kesteven and Marquess of Lindsey, 5th Earl of Lindsey, 18th Baron Willoughby de Eresby
Peregrine Bertie; 1714–1778; 3rd Duke of Ancaster and Kesteven and Marquess of Lindsey, 6th Earl of Lindsey, 19th Baron Willoughby de Eresby	Brownlow Bertie; 1729–1809; 5rd Duke of Ancaster and Kesteven and Marquess of Lindsey, 8th Earl of Lindsey	Peregrine Bertie c. 1709 – c. 1779
Baron Gwydyr, 1796	Dukedom of Ancaster and Kesteven and Marquessate of Lindsey extinct, 1809
Willoughby Bertie; 1740–1799; 4th Earl of Abingdon, 8th Baron Norreys	Robert Bertie; 1756–1779; 4th Duke of Ancaster and Kesteven and Marquess of Lindsey, 7th Earl of Lindsey, 20th Baron Willoughby de Eresby	Priscilla Bertie; 1761–1828; 21st Baroness Willoughby de Eresby	Peter Burrell; 1754–1820; 1st Baron Gwydyr	Albemarle Bertie; 1744–1818; 9th Earl of Lindsey
Montagu Bertie; 1784–1854; 5th Earl of Abingdon, 9th Baron Norreys	Peter Drummond-Burrell; 1782–1865; 22nd Baron Willoughby de Eresby, 2nd Baron Gwydyr	Lindsey Merrik Peter Burrell
Baron Aveland, 1856
Montagu Bertie; 1808–1884; 6th Earl of Abingdon, 10th Baron Norreys	Gilbert Heathcote; 1794–1867; 1st Baron Aveland	Clementina Drummond-Willoughby; 1809–1888; 24th Baron Willoughby de Eresby	Albyric Drummond-Willoughby; 1821–1870; 23rd Baron Willoughby de Eresby, 3rd Baron Gwydyr	Peter Robert Burrell; 1810–1909; 4th Baron Gwydyr	George Augustus Frederick Albemarle Bertie; 1814–1877; 10th Earl of Lindsey	Montague Peregrine Bertie; 1815–1899; 11th Earl of Lindsey
Baron Bertie of Thame, 1915; Viscount Bertie of Thame, 1918	Earl of Ancaster, 1892
Montagu Arthur Bertie; 1836–1928; 7th Earl of Abingdon	Viscount Bertie of Thame; 1844–1919; 1st Viscount Bertie of Thame and Baron Bertie of Thame	Gilbert Heathcote-Drummond-Willoughby; 1830–1910; 1st Earl of Ancaster, 25th Baron Willoughby de Eresby, 2nd Baron Aveland	Willoughby Merrik Campbell Burrell; 1841–1915; 5th Baron Gwydyr
Barony of Gwydyr extinct, 1915
Montagu Charles Francis Bertie; 1860–1919	Vere Frederick Bertie; 1878–1954; 2nd Viscount Bertie of Thame and Baron Bertie of Thame	Gilbert Heathcote-Drummond-Willoughby; 1867–1951; 2nd Earl of Ancaster, 26th Baron Willoughby de Eresby, 3rd Baron Aveland	Montague Peregrine Albemarle Bertie; 1861–1938; 12th Earl of Lindsey
Viscountcy and Barony of Bertie of Thame extinct, 1954
Montagu Henry Edmund Cecil Towneley-Bertie; 1887–1963; 13th Earl of Lindsey, 8th Earl of Abingdon	Arthur Michael Cosmo Bertie; 1886–c. 1954–1957	Gilbert James Heathcote-Drummond-Willoughby; 1907–1983; 3rd Earl of Ancaster, 27th Baron Willoughby de Eresby, 4th Baron Aveland
Earldom of Ancaster and Barony of Aveland extinct, 1983
Richard Henry Rupert Bertie b. 1931; 14th Earl of Lindsey, 9th Earl of Abingdon	Nancy Jane Marie Heathcote-Drummond-Willoughby b. 1934; 28th Baroness Willoughby de Eresby

== See also ==
- Baron Willoughby de Eresby
- Burrell baronets, of Valentine Park
- Peter Burrell (1692–1756)
- Peter Burrell (1724–1775)

Baronetage of Great Britain
Preceded by East baronets	Burrell baronets of West Grinstead Park; 15 July 1766	Succeeded by Cheere baronets
