= Ralph Hastings (died 1495) =

Member of the Parliament of England

Sir Ralph Hastings
- Died: 1495
- Spouse: Amy Tattershall
- Issue: Florence Hastings; Margery Hastings; Elizabeth Hastings; Isabel Hastings; Katherine Hastings; Amy Hastings
- Father: Sir Leonard Hastings
- Mother: Alice Camoys

Sir Ralph Hastings (died 1495), third son of Sir Leonard Hastings, was a supporter of the House of York during the Wars of the Roses. He fought at the Battle of Barnet, and was knighted at the Battle of Tewkesbury. He held numerous offices during the reign of Edward IV, including Keeper of the Lions and Leopards in the Tower of London, and Lieutenant of Guisnes and Captain of Calais.

== Family ==
Ralph Hastings was the third son of Sir Leonard Hastings (d.1396 – 20 October 1455) and Alice Camoys, daughter of Thomas de Camoys, 1st Baron Camoys, by his first wife, Elizabeth Louches. He had three brothers and three sisters:

- William Hastings, 1st Baron Hastings, who married Katherine Neville, sister of Richard Neville, Earl of Warwick, and widow of William Bonville, 6th Baron Harington. He was beheaded 13 June 1483 by order of the future Richard III.
- Richard Hastings, Baron Welles (died 1503), also styled Lord Willoughby, who married firstly Joan Welles, only daughter of Richard Welles, 7th Baron Welles, by his first wife, Joan Willoughby, only daughter of Robert Willoughby, 6th Baron Willoughby de Eresby, and secondly Joan Romondbye (d. 20 March 1505), widow of Richard Pigot, (died c. 15 April 1483), Serjeant-at-law.
- Thomas Hastings.
- Elizabeth Hastings (c. 1450 – 1508), who married, before 1465, Sir John Donne (1450–1503) of Kidwelly, Carmarthenshire, third son of Griffith Donne of Kidwelly by Janet, daughter of Sir John Scudamore, and by him had two sons, Sir Edward Donne (c. 1482 – 1552) and Sir Griffith Donne (c. 1487 – 1543), and two daughters, Anne Donne (c. 1471 – c. 1507), who was the first wife of Sir William Rede of Boarstall, Buckinghamshire, and Margaret Donne (born c.1480), who married Edward Trussell (c.1478 – 16 June 1499) of Elmesthorpe, and was the mother of Elizabeth Trussell (1496–1527), wife of John de Vere, 15th Earl of Oxford.
- Anne Hastings, who married Thomas Ferrers, esquire.
- Joan Hastings, who married John Brokesby, esquire.

== Career ==
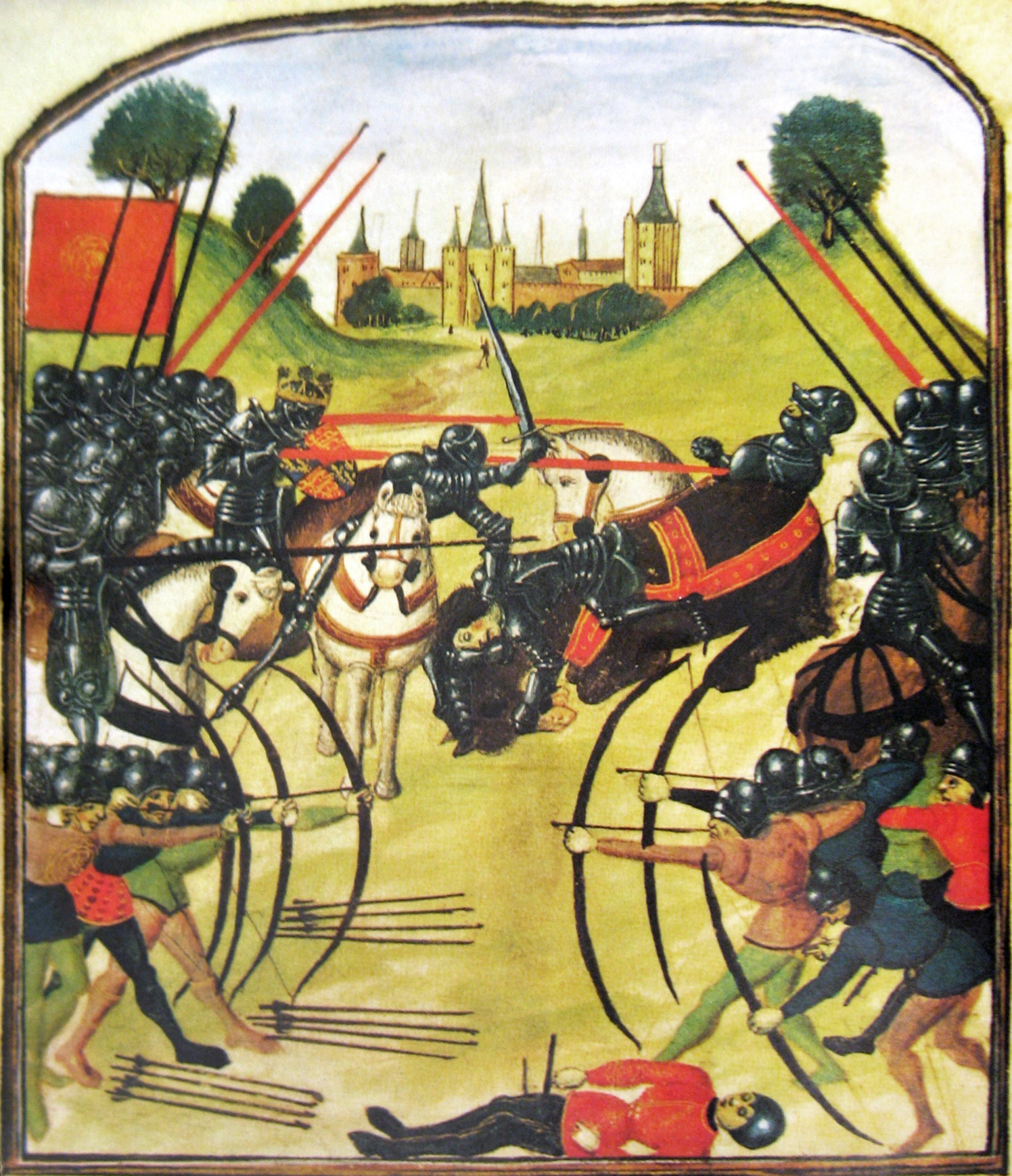
Depiction of the Battle of Tewkesbury, at which Sir Ralph Hastings was knighted

During the Wars of the Roses, Ralph Hastings was a committed supporter of the House of York. He was both an esquire and a knight of the body to Edward IV. He fought at the battles of Barnet on 14 April 1471 and at Tewkesbury on 4 May 1471, where he was knighted. In the same year the King appointed him joint keeper of Rockingham Castle in Kent, and granted him an annuity of 50 marks. In 1462 he was granted the manor of Great Harrowden, forfeited to the crown by the attainder on 4 November 1461 of Sir William Vaux, later slain at Tewkesbury. He held numerous offices during the reign of Edward IV, including Keeper of the Lions and Leopards in the Tower of London.

In 1470 he was Controller of Customs in Lynn, Norfolk, as well as Controller of Petty Customs in London. He was High Sheriff of Northamptonshire in 1471, and represented the county in Parliament as Knight of the Shire in 1472. In 1472 he and his eldest brother, William Hastings, 1st Baron Hastings, were granted licence to found a guild at the church of St Gregory in Northampton. In 1475 he was with the English forces in France, and from 1474 to 1483 was Lieutenant of Guisnes. He also served as Captain of Calais, where his eldest brother, William, was Lieutenant, and in 1483 was granted an annuity of £40 from the town's revenues.

Edward IV died on 9 April 1483, and two months later, on 13 June 1483, the future Richard III had Hastings's eldest brother, William, beheaded at the Tower of London for allegedly conspiring against him. Despite this, on 6 July another of Hastings' brothers, Richard Hastings, Baron Welles, was among the thirty-five peers who attended Richard's coronation.

Hastings died before 1 December 1495. In his will, dated 17 September 1495 he left his manors in Wanstead, Essex, and Woolwich, Kent to his wife, a marriage portion to his daughter Amy, his 'little primer' to his granddaughter, Anne Longueville, and his best horse to his brother, Richard Hastings, Baron Welles.

He requested burial at St Bridget of Syon in Middlesex, and failing that, at Barking Abbey.

== Marriages and issue ==
Hastings married Amy Tattershall, the daughter and co-heir of John Tattershall, esquire, of Woolwich, Kent, and Wanstead, Essex, by Agnes Chicheley, the daughter of John Chicheley, Chamberlain of London and nephew of Archbishop Henry Chicheley. Agnes Chicheley's sister, Margery Chicheley (d. 2 February 1518), married John Roper (died 1488), by whom she was the grandmother of William Roper, son-in-law of Sir Thomas More.

Sir Ralph Hastings and Amy Tattershall had six daughters:

- Florence Hastings (died c.1536), eldest daughter, who married firstly Edmund Grey, 9th Baron Grey (d. 5 May 1511) of Wilton, Herefordshire, by whom she had four sons and two daughters: George Grey, 10th Baron Grey of Wilton, Thomas Grey, 11th Baron Grey of Wilton, Richard Grey, 12th Baron Grey of Wilton, William Grey, 13th Baron Grey of Wilton, Elizabeth Grey, who married John Brydges, 1st Baron Chandos, and Barbara Grey, a nun at Elstow Abbey. Florence Hastings married secondly Richard Brett, gentleman, of Bletchley, Buckinghamshire.
- Margery Hastings, who married John Pole.
- Elizabeth Hastings, who married Sir John Longvile of Wolverton, Buckinghamshire.
- Isabel Hastings, who married Sir John Dyve (d.1536/7) of Bromham, Bedfordshire.
- Katherine Hastings, who married William Norwich.
- Amy Hastings.
