= Baron Welles =

Extinct barony in the Peerage of England

The title of Baron Welles has been created three times. Its first creation was for Adam de Welles on 6 May 1299 in the Peerage of England by writ of summons. This creation was extinguished by attainder in 1469. The title was created a second time in the Peerage of England by writ of summons for Sir Richard Hastings on 15 November 1482 and became extinct on his death. The third creation was on 8 January 1781, in the Peerage of Ireland, for Thomas Knox, later Viscount Northland. It is now a subsidiary title of the Earl of Ranfurly.

== Barons Welles (1299) ==
- Adam de Welles, 1st Baron Welles (d. 1311)
- Robert de Welles, 2nd Baron Welles (1297–1320)
- Adam de Welles, 3rd Baron Welles (1304–1345)
- John de Welles, 4th Baron Welles (1334–1361)
- John de Welles, 5th Baron Welles (1352–1421)
- Lionel de Welles, 6th Baron Welles (1406–1461) (attainted 1461)
- Richard de Welles, 7th Baron Welles (c. 1429–1469/1470) (attainder reversed 1468; attainted 1469/1470)
- Robert de Welles, 8th Baron Welles (ex. 1470)

== Barons Welles (1482) ==
- Richard Hastings, Baron Welles (d. 1503), might have been deprived of title in 1486, due to reversal of attainders in 1485/86 parliament.

== Viscount Welles (1487) ==
- John Welles, 1st Viscount Welles (c. 1450–1499)

== Barons Welles (1781) ==
- Thomas Knox, 1st Baron Welles (1729–1818) (created Viscount Northland 1791)

For further Barons Welles, see Earl of Ranfurly.
