= East baronets of Hall Place (1766) =

Escutcheon of the East baronets of Hall Place

The East baronetcy of Hall Place, Maidenhead, Berkshire was created in the Baronetage of Great Britain for William East on 5 June 1766, who was High Sheriff of Berkshire the same year. He was the son of the barrister William East and his wife Anne Cooke, daughter of George Cooke. The 2nd baronet was appointed High Sheriff of Berkshire in 1822.

== East baronets, of Hall Place (1766) ==
- Sir William East, 1st Baronet (1738–1819)
- Sir Gilbert East, 2nd Baronet (1764–1828). The title was extinct on his death.

== Notes ==
Baronetage of Great Britain
Preceded by Pringle baronets	East baronets of Hall Place; 5 June 1766	Succeeded by Burrell baronets
