= Richard Hastings, Baron Welles =

British royalty

Sir Richard Hastings
- Died: 1503
- Buried: Greyfriars, London
- Issue: Anthony Hastings
- Father: Sir Leonard Hastings
- Mother: Alice Camoys

Sir Richard Hastings, Baron Welles (died 1503), was the son of Sir Leonard Hastings and a younger brother of William Hastings, 1st Baron Hastings. He was a favourite of Edward IV, who granted him the lands of the baronies of Willoughby and Welles after he had married the heiress, Joan Welles. He fought at Tewkesbury. He died in 1503, and was buried at the Greyfriars, London.

== Family ==
Richard Hastings was the second son of Sir Leonard Hastings (1396 – 20 October 1455) and Alice Camoys, daughter of Thomas de Camoys, 1st Baron Camoys, by his first wife, Elizabeth Louches, the daughter and heiress of William Louches. He had three brothers and three sisters:

- William Hastings, 1st Baron Hastings, who married Katherine Neville, sister of Richard Neville, Earl of Warwick, and widow of William Bonville, 6th Baron Harington, slain at the Battle of Wakefield 30 December 1460. He was beheaded 13 June 1483 by order of the future Richard III.
- Sir Ralph Hastings (d.1495) of Harrowden, Northamptonshire, who married Amy Tattershall, daughter and heiress of John Tattershall, esquire, of Woolwich, Kent, and Wanstead, Essex, by whom he had six daughters.
- Thomas Hastings.
- Elizabeth Hastings (c.1450 – 1508), who married, before 1465, Sir John Donne (1450–1503) of Kidwelly, Carmarthenshire, third son of Griffith Donne of Kidwelly by Janet, daughter of Sir John Scudamore, and by him had two sons, Sir Edward Donne (c.1482 – 1552) and Sir Griffith Donne (c.1487 – 1543), and two daughters, Anne Donne (c.1471 – c. 1507), who was the first wife of Sir William Rede of Boarstall, Buckinghamshire, and Margaret Donne (born c.1480), who married Edward Trussell (c.1478 – 16 June 1499) of Elmesthorpe, and was the mother of Elizabeth Trussell (1496–1527), wife of John de Vere, 15th Earl of Oxford.
- Anne Hastings, who married Thomas Ferrers, esquire.
- Joan Hastings, who married John Brokesby, esquire.

== Career ==
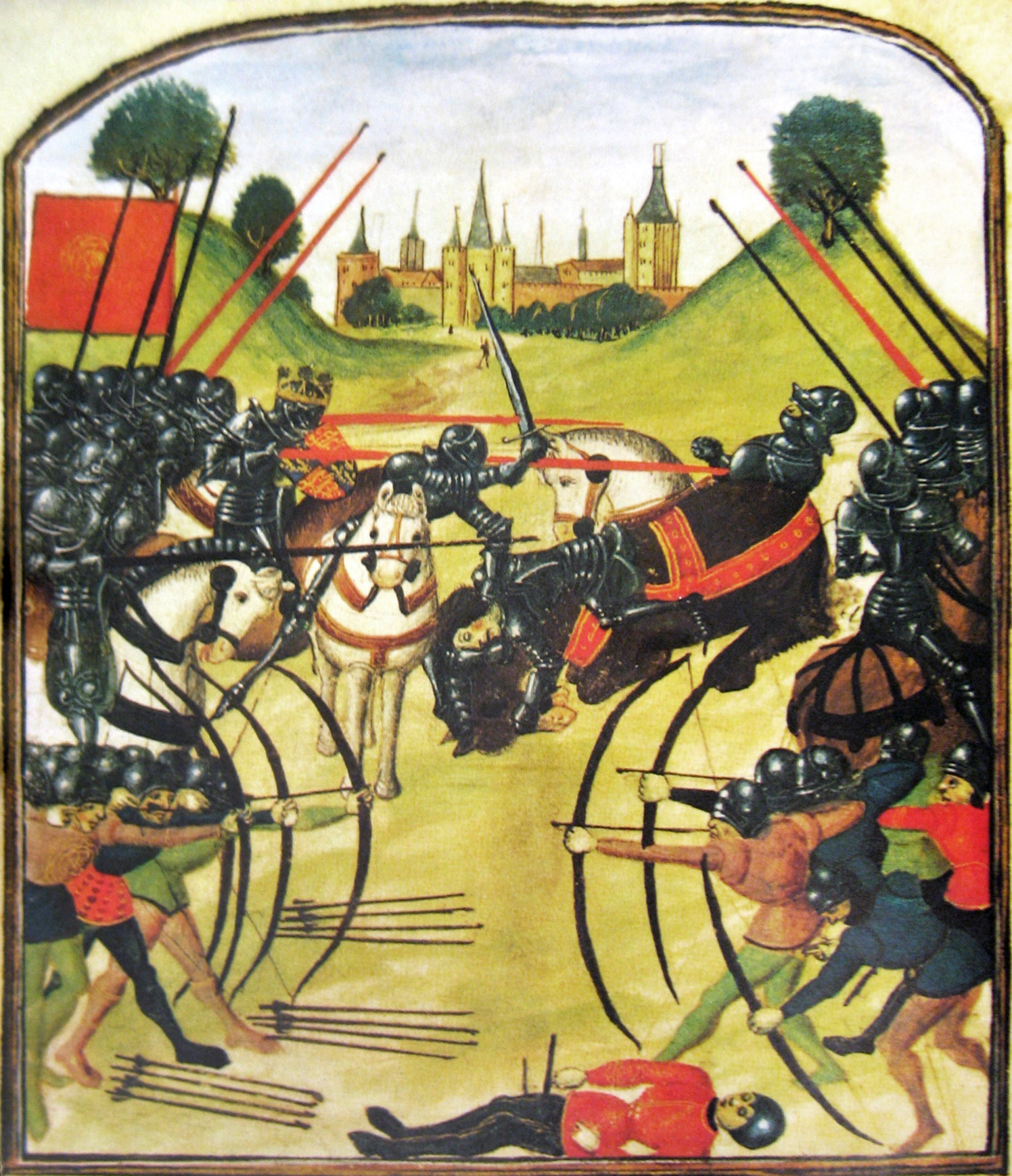
Depiction of the Battle of Tewkesbury, at which Richard Hastings was knighted

During the Wars of the Roses, Hastings was a committed supporter of the House of York. Shortly before 1 June 1470, he married Joan Welles, who was heir to her brother, Robert Welles, 8th Baron Willoughby de Eresby. Her inheritance was complicated by the fact that, as the result of an anti-Yorkist uprising in Lincolnshire, Joan Welles' father, Richard Welles, 7th Baron Welles, and her brother, Sir Robert, had been beheaded by order of Edward IV within a week of each other, her father on 12 March 1470, and her brother on 19 March. A month later, on 25 April 1470, the King seized Sir Robert Welles' lands, but on 1 June 1470, granted them to Joan and her now husband, Sir Richard Hastings, giving them licence to enter all the lands 'which on the death of her father and brother, both tenants-in-chief, should descend to her'. According to modern doctrine, Joan also inherited the baronies of Willoughby and Welles after her brother's execution.

A year later, on 4 May 1471, Hastings fought for the victorious Yorkists at the Battle of Tewkesbury, and was knighted by Edward IV. In 1475 his elder brother, William Hastings, 1st Baron Hastings, was with the King in France, and Hastings was appointed, as deputy for his brother, surveyor of the office of Constable of Nottingham Castle, as well as magistrate of several forests, chases and parks in Nottinghamshire, Derbyshire, Leicestershire and Staffordshire.

Joan Welles died about 1474/5. The exact date of her death is not known; however she likely died shortly before her father and brother were attainted, five years after their executions, by the Parliament of January–March 1475. As a result of the attainders, all their honours were forfeited, including the baronies of Welles and Willoughby, which should have been inherited, respectively, after Joan Welles' death, by her paternal uncle, John Welles, 1st Viscount Welles, and her second cousin, Christopher Willoughby, 10th Baron Willoughby de Eresby. According to some historians, the attainders were passed by Parliament in order to enable Edward IV to grant Joan Welles' lands after her death to her husband, 'the trusted Yorkist Sir Richard Hastings', and accordingly, on 23 January 1475, the King granted Hastings a life interest in the greater part of the Welles and Willoughby estates. Moreover, Hastings was summoned to Parliament from 14 November 1482 to 9 December 1483 by writs directed Ricardo Hastyng de Wellys, whereby he is held to have become either Lord Hastings of Welles, or Lord Welles.

Edward IV died on 9 April 1483. On 13 June 1483 the future Richard III had Hastings's elder brother, William, beheaded at the Tower of London for allegedly conspiring against him. Only a few weeks later, on 6 July, Hastings was among the thirty-five peers who attended Richard's coronation.

On 22 May 1484 the new King granted him an annuity of 1000 marks during life, and on 4 May 1485 granted him, again for life, the office of surveyor of the lordship and manor of Tattershall in Lincolnshire, apart from the castle itself. He was also appointed Master of Game of all deer, either in the park and chase, or elsewhere within the manor.

Richard III died at the Battle of Bosworth on 22 August 1485, and under the new regime of Henry VII, the attainders of Joan Welles' father and brother, as well as the attainder of her uncle, John Welles, were all reversed by the Parliament of 1485/6. John Welles was still living, and with the reversal of his attainder became Lord Welles. Sir Richard Hastings was thus no longer recognized as Lord Welles. In compensation, however, it was enacted in the same year that Hastings should be entitled, for life, to all the lands which had belonged to Joan Welles' father. Having received this grant, until his death Hastings continued to be styled, and styled himself, Lord Willoughby, to the exclusion of Christopher Willoughby, 10th Baron Willoughby de Eresby, who should have inherited the title. In his will, dated 17 September 1495, Hastings' brother, Sir Ralph Hastings, referred to him as 'my brother, Sir Richard Hastings, Lord Willoughby'. In his own will, dated 18 March 1502 and proved 5 October 1503, Hastings referred to himself as 'Richard Hastings, knight, Lord Willoughby'.

He was buried September 1503 at the Greyfriars in London.

In the reign of Elizabeth I, the barony of Willoughby was claimed, in right of his wife, by Richard Bertie, husband of Katherine Willoughby, Duchess of Suffolk, granddaughter of Christopher Willoughby, 10th Baron Willoughby de Eresby.

== Marriages and issue ==
Hastings married firstly Joan Welles, the daughter of Richard Welles, 7th Baron Welles (beheaded 12 March 1470), and his first wife, Joan Willoughby, de jure suo jure Baroness Willoughby, daughter and heiress of Robert Willoughby, 6th Baron Willoughby de Eresby, by his first wife, Elizabeth Montagu, daughter of John Montagu, 3rd Earl of Salisbury. They had one son, Anthony Hastings, who predeceased his father.

He married secondly Joan Romondbye (d. 20 March 1505), widow of Richard Pigot, (died c. 15 April 1483), Serjeant-at-law, by whom he had no issue.

== Notes ==
Peerage of England
Preceded by Robert Welles, 8th Baron Willoughby de Eresby	Baron Welles; 1470–1486	Succeeded by John Welles, 1st Viscount Welles
