= Christopher Willoughby, 10th Baron Willoughby de Eresby =

- Born: 1453
- Died: 1 November 1498 – 13 July 1499
- Spouse: Margaret Jenney
- Issue: William Willoughby, 11th Baron Willoughby de Eresby; Sir Christopher Willoughby; Robert Willoughby; George Willoughby; Richard Willoughby; Edmund Willoughby; Hugh Willoughby; Sir John Willoughby; Sir Thomas Willoughby; Katherine Willoughby; Margaret Willoughby; Elizabeth Willoughby
- Father: Sir Robert Willoughby
- Mother: Cecily Welles

Sir Christopher Willoughby, de jure 10th Baron Willoughby de Eresby, KB (1453 – between 1 November 1498 and 13 July 1499), was heir to his second cousin, Joan Welles, 9th Baroness Willoughby de Eresby, in her own right Lady Willoughby, as well as great-grandson and heir male to William Willoughby, 5th Baron Willoughby de Eresby. Christopher Willoughby was also heir to his elder brother, Robert Willoughby, who died unmarried and underage on 24 March 1467. He was unable to enjoy his inherited title as a result of the attainders of his cousin Joan Welles' father, Richard Welles, 7th Baron Welles, and brother, Robert Welles, 8th Baron Willoughby de Eresby.

== Family ==
Christopher Willoughby, born in 1453, was the second son of Sir Robert Willoughby (d. 30 May 1465) of Parham, Suffolk, and Cecily Welles, the daughter of Lionel de Welles, 6th Baron Welles (d. 29 March 1461), and his first wife, Jane Waterton, the daughter of Robert Waterton (d. 1425), esquire, of Methley, Yorkshire, by Cecily Fleming, daughter of Sir Robert Fleming of Woodhall. He was the grandson of Sir Thomas Willoughby and Joan Arundel (born c. 1407), daughter and co-heiress of Sir Richard Arundel and his wife Alice, and the great-grandson of William Willoughby, 5th Baron Willoughby de Eresby (d. 4 December 1409), and Lucy Le Strange.

After the death of Jane Waterton, circa 1455, Lionel Welles married Margaret Beauchamp (c. 1410 – c. 3 June 1482), widow, successively, of Sir Oliver St John (c. 1398 – 1437) and John Beaufort, 1st Duke of Somerset (d. 27 May 1444), and daughter of Sir John Beauchamp of Bletsoe, Bedfordshire, by his second wife, Edith Stourton, daughter of Sir John Stourton (died c. 1414) of Stourton, Wiltshire.

By her second marriage to John Beaufort, Margaret Beauchamp was the mother of Margaret Beaufort, mother of Henry VII. Christopher Willoughby's mother, Cecily Welles, was thus a step-sister of Margaret Beaufort.

== Career ==
Christopher Willoughby had livery of his lands on 15 July 1474. His second cousin, Joan Welles, 9th Baroness Willoughby de Eresby, died about that time. The exact date of her death is not known; however, she likely died shortly before her father, Richard Welles, 7th Baron Welles, and brother, Robert Welles, 8th Baron Willoughby de Eresby, were attainted, five years after their executions, by the Parliament of January–March 1475. As a result of the attainders, all their honours were forfeited, including the baronies of Welles and Willoughby, which should have been inherited, respectively, after Joan Welles' death, by her uncle of the half blood, John Welles, 1st Viscount Welles, and her second cousin, Christopher Willoughby.

According to some historians, the attainders were passed by Parliament in order to enable Edward IV to grant Joan Welles' lands after her death to her husband, 'the trusted Yorkist Sir Richard Hastings', and accordingly, on 23 January 1475, the king granted Hastings a life interest in the greater part of the Welles and Willoughby estates. Moreover, Hastings was summoned to Parliament from 14 November 1482 to 9 December 1483 by writs directed Ricardo Hastyng de Wellys, whereby he is held to have become either Lord Hastings of Welles, or Lord Welles.

Willoughby was made a Knight of the Bath at the coronation of Richard III on 7 July 1483, and served frequently on commissions in Suffolk from 1483 to 1497.

Under Henry VII, the attainders of Joan Welles' father and brother, as well as the attainder of her uncle, John Welles, were all reversed by the Parliament of 1485/6. John Welles was still living, and with the reversal of his attainder became Lord Welles. Joan Welles' former husband, Sir Richard Hastings, was thus no longer recognized as Lord Welles. In compensation, however, it was enacted in the same year that Hastings should be entitled, for life, to all the lands which had belonged to Joan Welles' father. Having received this grant, until his death Hastings continued to be styled, and styled himself, Lord Willoughby, to the exclusion of Christopher Willoughby, who should have inherited the title.

On 25 November 1487 Willoughby was in attendance at the coronation of Elizabeth of York. In 1499 he was co-heir to his uncle, John Welles, 1st Viscount Welles.

He left a will dated 1 November 1498, which was proved 13 July 1499. He was buried at Campsey Priory, Suffolk, beside his father.

== Marriage and issue ==
Willoughby married, before 28 March 1482, Margaret Jenney (d.1515/16), the daughter of Sir William Jenney of Knodishall, Suffolk, by his first wife, Elizabeth Cawse, daughter of Thomas Cawse, by whom he had nine sons and three daughters:

- William Willoughby, 11th Baron Willoughby de Eresby, who married, as his second wife, María de Salinas, lady-in-waiting to Katherine of Aragon, by whom he had a daughter, Katherine, Duchess of Suffolk
- Sir Christopher Willoughby (d. 1538–40), who married Elizabeth Tailboys (d. 1546), youngest daughter of Sir George Tailboys (d. 24 September 1538), by whom he was the father of William Willoughby, 1st Baron Willoughby of Parham
- Robert Willoughby, a cleric
- George Willoughby
- Richard Willoughby
- Edmund Willoughby
- Hugh Willoughby
- Sir John Willoughby, who married Cecily Wentworth, the widow of Robert Southwell, enquire
- Sir Thomas Willoughby (d. 1545), Chief Justice of the Common Pleas, who married Bridget Rede (d. 1558), daughter of Sir Robert Rede (d. 1519), Chief Justice of the Common Pleas, heiress of Bore Place in Chiddingstone, Kent, by whom he was the father of Robert Willoughby of Bore Place. Sir Robert Rede was an executor of the will of Henry VII. Sir Thomas Willougby's widow Bridget married secondly Anthony Knyvett.
- Katherine Willoughby, who married Sir John Heydon (d. 16 August 1550), eldest son and heir of Sir Henry Heydon.
- Margaret Willoughby, who married Sir Thomas Tyrrell (d. 1551) of Gipping, Suffolk, eldest son of Sir James Tyrrell (beheaded 6 May 1502) and Anne Arundel, daughter of Sir John Arundel (d. 12 November 1473) of Lanherne, Cornwall, by his first wife, Elizabeth Morley, daughter of Thomas, Lord Morley, by whom she had a son, Sir John Tyrrell (d. 1574), who married Elizabeth Munday, the daughter of Sir John Munday (d. 1537), Lord Mayor of London, and a daughter, Anne Tyrrell, who married Sir John Clere of Ormesby, Norfolk
- Elizabeth Willoughby (born c. 1483), who married William Eure, 1st Baron Eure (d. 15 March 1548), by whom she had three sons and three daughters

== Notes ==
Peerage of England
Preceded by Joan Welles	Baron Willoughby de Eresby; 1475–1499	Succeeded by William Willoughby
