= Willoughby Burrell, 5th Baron Gwydyr =

The Lord Gwydyr
- Born: 26 October 1841
- Died: 14 February 1915 (aged 73)
- Occupations: Captain, Rifle Brigade
- Known for: Fellow, Royal Geographical Society

Willoughby Merrik Campbell Burrell, 5th Baron Gwydyr, FRGS (26 October 1841 – 14 February 1915) was a British Army officer and peer.

Burrell was the son of Peter Robert Burrell, 4th Baron Gwydyr and Sophia Campbell. He had only one sibling, Hon. Cicely Burrell (born 1858), a half-sister, from his father's second marriage. On 3 April 1909, Burrell succeeded his father and became the 5th Baron Gwydyr, of Gwydyr, County Carnarvon [G.B., 1796].

He was a Captain in the Rifle Brigade and Honorary Colonel in the 4th Battalion, Suffolk Regiment. He was also a Fellow of the Royal Geographical Society.

On 4 September 1873 at the British Embassy in Paris, he married Mary Banks, the only child of Sir John Thomas Banks who was Regius Professor of Physic at Trinity College, Dublin. They had three children:

1. Catherine Mary Sermonda Burrell, married in 1902 John Henniker-Heaton (1877-1963), who later succeeded as 2nd Baronet Henniker-Heaton.
2. John Percy Burrell (1873–1902)
3. Randulphus Clement Robert Burrell (1876–1882)

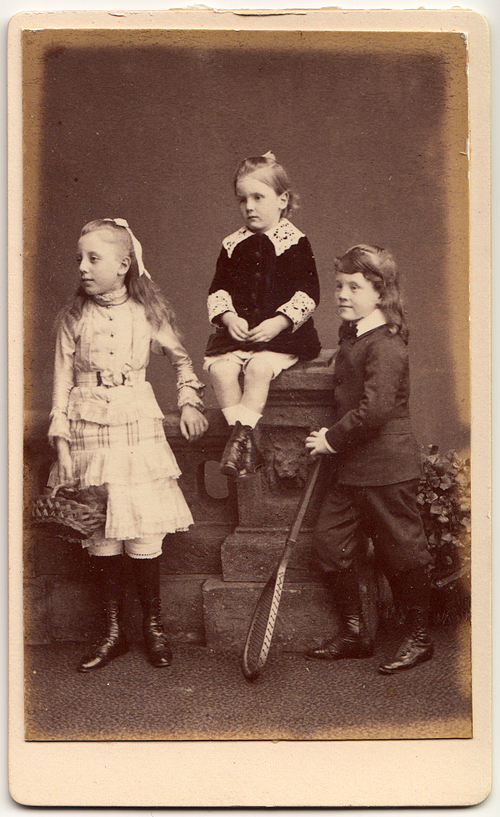
John Percy, Sermonda and Randulphus Clement Burrell, Merrion Square, Dublin. 1882

The family lived at 11 Merrion Square Dublin as well as at Golagh House in County Monaghan. Randulphus died aged 6 in the house on Merrion Square despite Dr. Banks living nearby at number 45. Mary Banks Burrell was an early collector of materials related to Richard Wagner. She died on 26 June 1898 having published the first volume of Wagner's biography. Burrell moved the remaining family to Suffolk where, on 4 June 1901, he married Anne Ord (died 1910), daughter of John Ord, but had no further children. Sermonda attended the Dublin Metropolitan School of Art. Both Burrell and his daughter, Sermonda, were members of the Ipswich Art Club. Burrell commissioned a full-length portrait of Anne from John Lavery who also presented Anne with a less formal portrait as a gift.

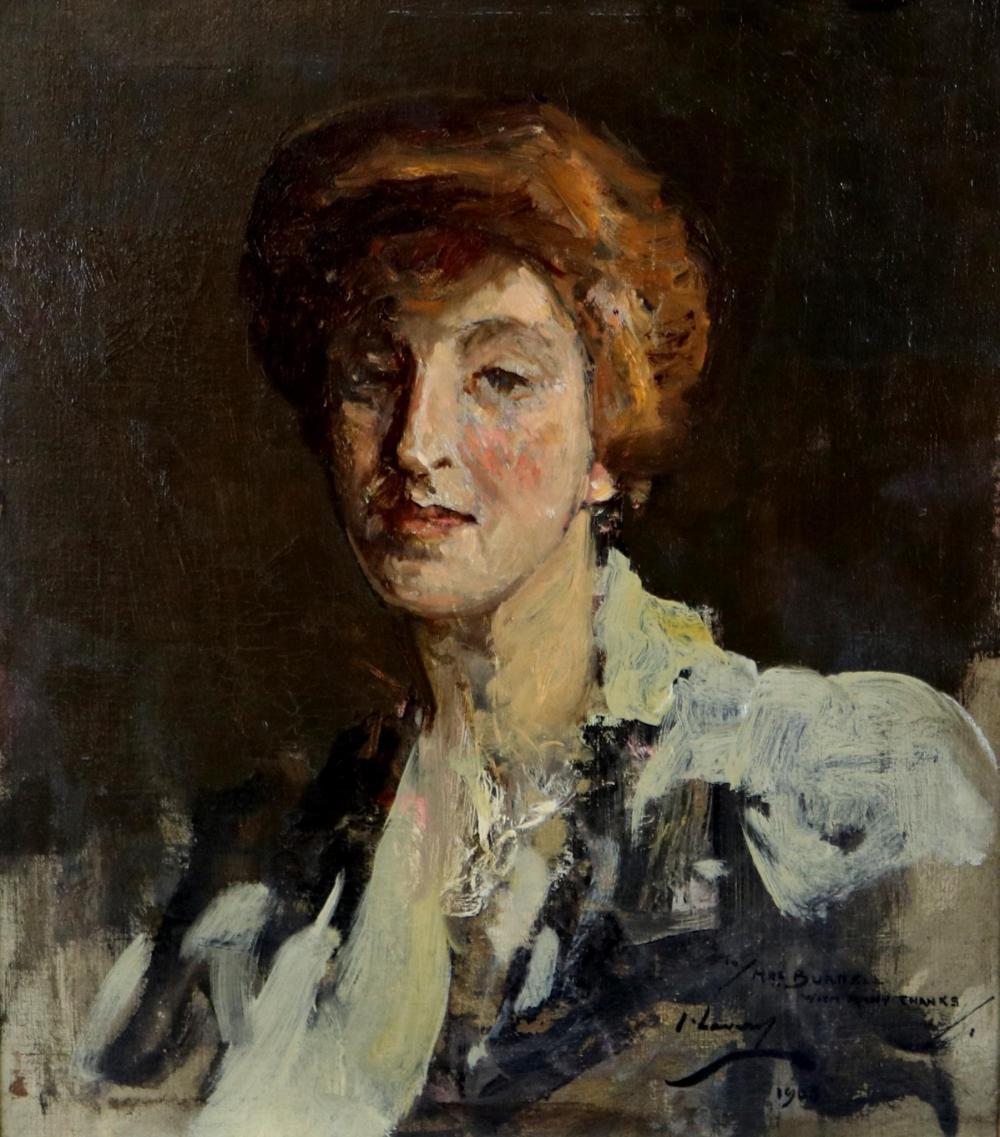
Mrs Burrell, Lavery 1903

Peerage of Great Britain
Preceded by Peter Robert Burrell	Baron Gwydyr; 1909–1915	Extinct
