= Lionel Welles, 6th Baron Welles =

English peer

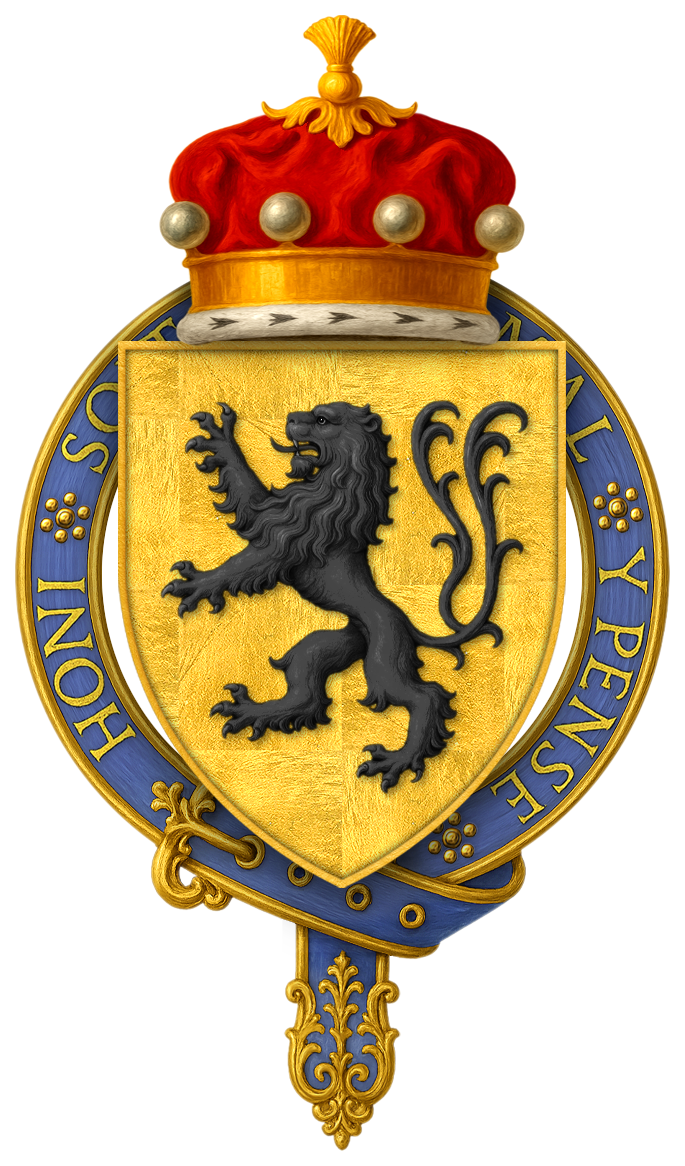
- Arms of Sir Lionel de Welles, 6th Baron Welles, KG
- Born: c. 1406, Conisholme, Lincolnshire
- Died: 29 March 1461; Towton, Yorkshire
- Buried: Methley, Yorkshire
- Spouses: Joan Waterton; Margaret Beauchamp
- Issue: Richard Welles, 7th Baron Welles; John Welles, 1st Viscount Welles; Cecily Welles; Margaret Welles; Eleanor Welles; Katherine Welles
- Father: Eude Welles
- Mother: Maud Greystoke

Lionel de Welles, 6th Baron Welles, KG (c. 1406 – 29 March 1461) was an English peer who served as Lord Lieutenant of Ireland and Joint Deputy of Calais. He was slain fighting on the Lancastrian side at the Battle of Towton, and was attainted on 21 December 1461. As a result of the attainder, his son, Richard Welles, 7th Baron Welles, did not succeed him in the barony of Welles until the attainder was reversed by Parliament in June 1467.

== Family ==
Born about 1406, Lionel Welles was the son of Eudes Welles and Maud Greystoke. On his father's side, he was the grandson of John de Welles, 5th Baron Welles (d. 26 August 1421), and Eleanor Mowbray, and on his mother's side, the grandson of Ralph de Greystoke, 3rd Baron Greystoke and Katherine Clifford, daughter of Roger de Clifford, 5th Baron de Clifford. He had one brother, Sir William Welles, Lord Chancellor of Ireland.

== Career ==
Lionel Welles' father, Eudes Welles, died sometime before 26 July 1417, predeceasing his own father, the 5th Baron. At the death of the 5th Baron in 1421, Lionel Welles thus inherited the Welles barony and lands, but as he was underage, his wardship was granted to his future father-in-law, Robert Waterton (d.1425), a 'trusted retainer of John of Gaunt and the Lancastrian Kings'.

He was knighted at the Parliament at Leicester by the infant Henry VI on 19 May 1426, and had control of his lands on 5 December 1427. He accompanied Henry VI to France in 1430, was summoned to Parliament from 25 February 1432 to 30 July 1460 by writs directed to Leoni de Welles, and was a privy councillor before 12 November 1434. In 1436 he was with Humphrey, Duke of Gloucester, in the expedition sent to relieve the siege of Calais. He was a member of Henry VI's household before February 1438. From 12 February 1438 he resided in Ireland as Lord Lieutenant; according to Hicks, he 'failed to control the contending factions and resigned prematurely in 1442'. In 1441 he was particularly embarrassed at his inability to prosecute Thomas FitzGerald, the Prior of the Knights Hospitallers at Kilmainham, whom he accused of being party to the kidnapping of Lionel's brother William. The Prior produced a royal pardon, and no action was taken against him; nor would he release William until certain demands were met.

His dealings, together with his kinsmen Robert Willoughby, 6th Baron Willoughby de Eresby and Ralph, Lord Cromwell, towards a servant of William Tailboys at Boston, Lincolnshire are complained of in a letter earlier than 1450 to the Viscount Beaumont among the Paston Letters. Together with Richard Woodville, 1st Earl Rivers, he served as Joint Deputy of Calais for his brother-in-law, Edmund Beaufort, 2nd Duke of Somerset, who was Lieutenant of Calais from 1451 to 1455, and apparently remained at Calais until 20 April 1456, when Richard Neville, 16th Earl of Warwick, took over as Lieutenant. Despite these appointments, according to Hicks, Welles was 'essentially a Lincolnshire landowner'; he was a Justice of the Peace and served on other commissions in that county.

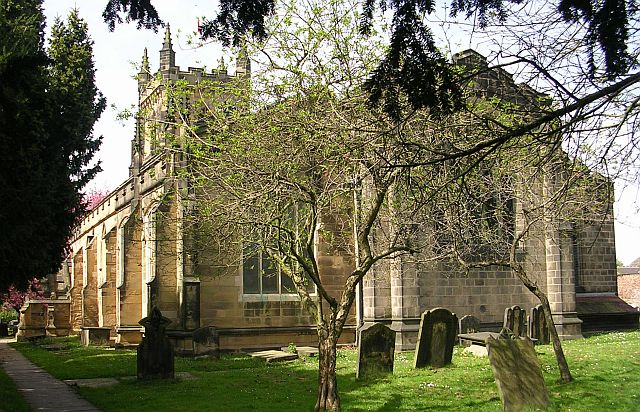
St Oswald's church, Methley, near Leeds

He was installed, together with John Talbot, 2nd Earl of Shrewsbury, as a Knight of the Garter on 14 May 1457, and in October of that year was sent with English reinforcements to Calais.

He was taken prisoner by Yorkist forces at the Battle of Blore Heath on 23 September 1459. In 1461 he was with the army of Queen Margaret, which advanced on London, and won the Second Battle of St Albans on 17 February 1461. He was slain a month later at the Battle of Towton on 29 March 1461, though rumours of his survival ran about. After his death he was attained by Act of Parliament on 21 December 1461, whereby all his honours were forfeited. He was buried with his first wife, Joan Waterton, in the Waterton Chapel in St Oswald's parish church at Methley, Yorkshire, where they have a fine table-tomb monument with recumbent effigies. Welles is shown in full armour with a lion at his feet.

== Marriages and issue ==
Welles married firstly Jane (in some accounts, Cecily) Waterton, daughter of Robert Waterton, esquire, of Waterton, Lincs. and Methley, Yorkshire, and his wife, Cecily Fleming, daughter of Sir Robert Fleming of Woodhall (brother of Richard Fleming, Bishop of Lincoln), by whom he had one son and four daughters:

- Richard Welles, 7th Baron Welles.
- Cecily Welles, who married Sir Robert Willoughby of Parham, Suffolk and was the mother of Christopher Willoughby, 10th Baron Willoughby de Eresby.
- Margaret Welles (d. 13 July 1480), who married first, Sir Thomas Dymoke (executed 12 March 1470), and secondly Robert Radcliffe, esquire.
- Eleanor Welles (died before 1504), who married first, Thomas Hoo, Baron Hoo and Hastings (d. 13 February 1455); secondly Sir James Laurence (died 1490); and third, Hugh Hastings.
- Katherine Welles, who married first, Sir Thomas de la Launde (executed 19 March 1470), and secondly Robert Tempest (d. 23 April 1509), esquire.

Secondly, by licence dated 14 April 1447, he married Margaret Beauchamp, widow successively of Sir Oliver St John (d.1437) and John Beaufort, 1st Duke of Somerset (d. 27 May 1444), and daughter of Sir John Beauchamp of Bletsoe, Bedfordshire, by his second wife, Edith Stourton, daughter of Sir John Stourton, by whom he had one son:

- John Welles, 1st Viscount Welles, who married Cecily of York, the daughter of Edward IV of England.

By his second marriage Welles became the stepfather of Margaret Beaufort, mother of Henry VII.

== Notes ==
Peerage of England
Preceded by John de Welles	Baron Welles; 1421–1461	Succeeded by Attainted (attainder reversed in June 1467 for Richard de Welles)
