= Robert Welles, 8th Baron Willoughby de Eresby =

English peer

- Died: 19 March 1470; Doncaster
- Spouse: Elizabeth Bourchier
- Father: Richard Welles, 7th Baron Welles
- Mother: Joan Willoughby, 7th Baroness Willoughby de Eresby

Robert Welles, 8th Baron Willoughby de Eresby and 8th Baron Welles (died 19 March 1470), was the son of Richard Welles, 7th Baron Welles, and Joan Willoughby, 7th Baroness Willoughby de Eresby. He was the prime mover in an uprising against Edward IV in 1470, although his actions were possibly orchestrated by Richard Neville, 16th Earl of Warwick.

== Family ==
Robert Welles was the only son of Richard Welles, 7th Baron Welles, and Joan Willoughby, in her own right Lady Willoughby, the only daughter and heiress of Robert Willoughby, 6th Baron Willoughby de Eresby, by his first wife, Elizabeth Montagu, daughter of John Montagu, 3rd Earl of Salisbury. He had an only sister, Joan Welles, 9th Baroness Willoughby de Eresby, who married Sir Richard Hastings.

== Career ==
Welles was ordered to be arrested with his mother on 11 May 1461. He was a Justice of the Peace for Lincolnshire from 4 February 1467.

By 1470 discontent with Edward IV's rule had already led to open rebellion under Robin of Redesdale, resulting in the deaths of several senior Yorkists. The King pardoned the rebels, but there was continuing unrest in Lincolnshire. Historian Richard W. Kaeuper argues that the promotion of "parvenu Yorkist loyalists" in the area, and the King's toleration of their violent behaviour and defiance of the law provoked Sir Robert Welles and his father, Richard Welles, 7th Baron Welles, into resistance to the regime. Sir Robert Welles issued a series of proclamations throughout Lincolnshire, calling on men to resist the King who, he claimed, was coming to punish local people for supporting the earlier rebellion of Robin of Redesdale, in breach of the pardon he had given.

In February 1470 Sir Robert Welles attacked Gainsborough Old Hall, the house of Sir Thomas Burgh, Edward IV's Master of Horse. This incident is thought by some historians to have been a plot by Richard Neville, 16th Earl of Warwick, to provoke a reaction from Edward IV; however other historians consider it merely a 'private war'. The King summoned Sir Robert Welles' father, Lord Welles, and uncle, Sir Thomas Dymoke, to London to account for their actions. Both took sanctuary at Westminster Abbey, from which they were lured by the promise of a pardon, which was granted on 3 March 1470. By this time Sir Robert Welles had openly declared for Warwick and George, Duke of Clarence, and after pardoning Lord Welles and Dymoke, the King kept them under restraint while he marched north to personally suppress the Lincolnshire rebellion.

Sir Robert Welles assumed the style 'Captain of the Commons of Lincolnshire', and on 4 March 1470 mustered forces to resist the King. Warwick and Clarence sent letters to the King claiming they were raising armies to support him, hoping to use Sir Robert Welles to draw Edward into a trap by bringing their own armies up when the King pursued Welles. Welles pulled back his forces, but refused to lay down his arms, whereupon the King had Lord Welles and Dymoke executed at Queen's Cross in Stamford on 12 March 1470. Sir Robert Welles gave battle at Empingham at Losecoat Field, and was utterly defeated. He was captured, along with documents proving the complicity of Warwick and Clarence, who were forced to flee the country. Welles confessed his treason, naming Warwick and Clarence as the "partners and chief provokers" of the rebellion, and was beheaded on 19 March 1470 at Doncaster. On 25 April 1470, the King ordered the seizure of his lands.

After the executions of Sir Robert Welles, his only sister, Joan Welles, inherited, according to modern doctrine, the baronies of Willoughby and Welles.

Five years later, both Sir Robert Welles and his father were attainted. The Act of Attainder appears to have been passed by Parliament shortly after the death of Sir Robert Welles' only sister, Joan Welles, and according to some historians, its purpose was to enable Edward IV to grant Joan Welles' lands, after her death, to her former husband, 'the trusted Yorkist Sir Richard Hastings', Accordingly, on 23 January 1475, the King granted Hastings a life interest in the greater part of the Welles and Willoughby estates. Moreover, Hastings was summoned to Parliament from 14 November 1482 to 9 December 1483 by writs directed Ricardo Hastyng de Wellys, whereby he is held to have become either Lord Hastings of Welles, or Lord Welles.

Under Henry VII, the attainders of Sir Robert Welles and his father, as well as the attainder of Sir Robert Welles' uncle of the half blood, John Welles, were all reversed by the Parliament of 1485/6. John Welles was still living, and with the reversal of his attainder became Lord Welles. Sir Richard Hastings was thus no longer recognized as Lord Welles. In compensation, however, it was enacted in the same year that Hastings should be entitled, for life, to all the lands which had belonged to Joan Welles' father. Having received this grant, until his death Hastings continued to be styled, and styled himself, Lord Willoughby, to the exclusion of Christopher Willoughby, 10th Baron Willoughby de Eresby, who should have inherited the title.

== Marriage ==
Sir Robert Welles married Elizabeth Bourchier (d.1470), the daughter of John Bourchier, 1st Baron Berners, and Margery Berners, daughter and heiress of Richard Berners, esquire. She survived him by only a few months, and was buried by his side in the church of the Whitefriars in Doncaster. She left a will dated 2 October 1470.

== Notes ==
Peerage of England
| Preceded by Joan Willoughby | Baron Willoughby de Eresby; 1462–1470 | Succeeded by Joan Welles |
| Preceded by Richard Welles | Baron Welles; 1470 | Succeeded by Joan Welles |
