= Peter Burrell, 4th Baron Gwydyr =

The Lord Gwydyr
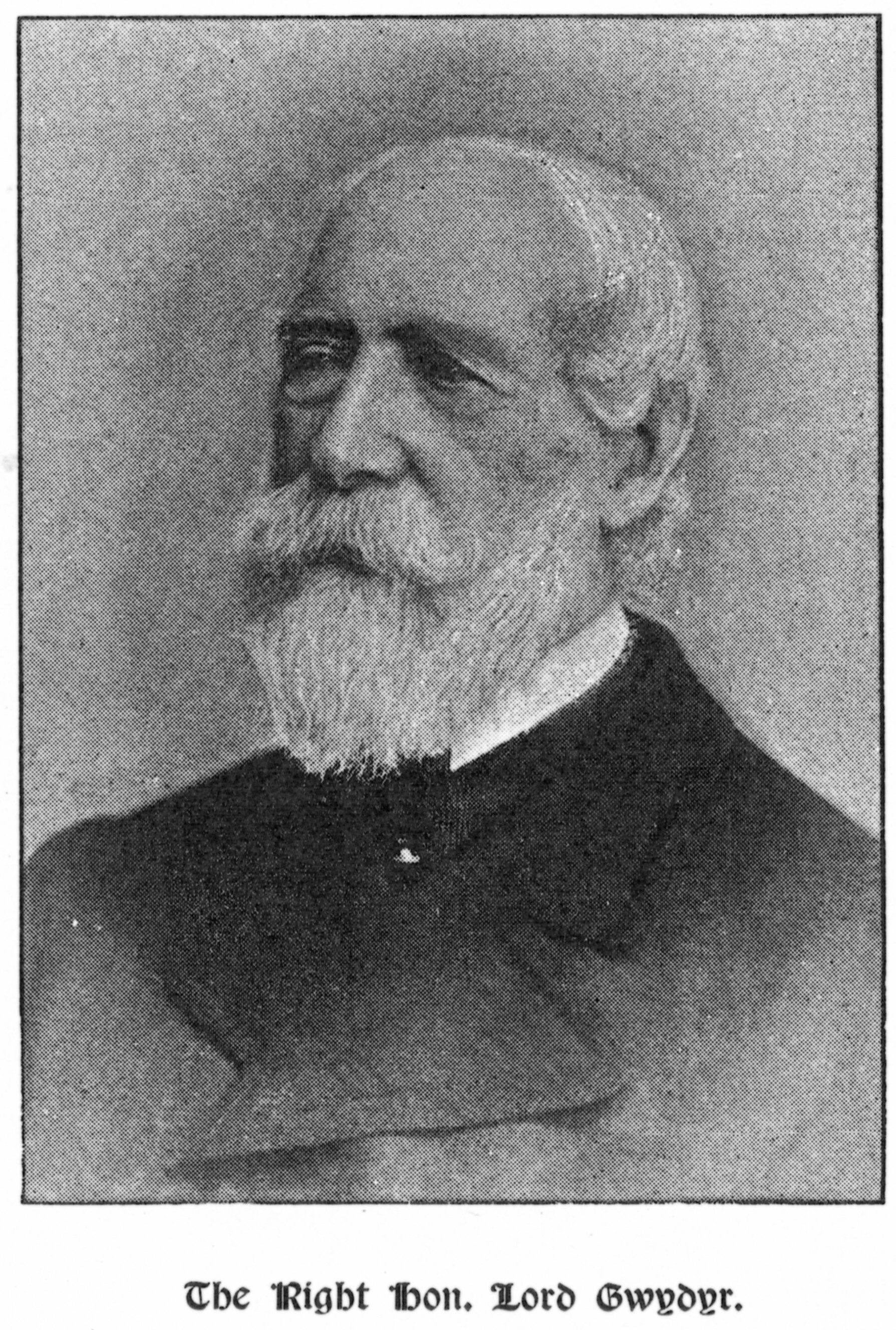
- Pictured in Suffolk Celebrities, 1893
- Born: 24 March 1810; Langley Park, Beckenham, Kent
- Died: 3 April 1909 (aged 99); Ipswich, Suffolk
- Known for: High Sheriff of Suffolk; Secretary to the Lord Great Chamberlain; High Steward of Ipswich; Chairman of Quarter Sessions, Suffolk

Peter Robert Burrell, 4th Baron Gwydyr (24 March 1810 – 3 April 1909) was High Sheriff of Suffolk in 1858. In addition, he was Secretary to the Lord Great Chamberlain, High Steward of Ipswich, and Chairman of Quarter Sessions, Suffolk. Burrell succeeded to the title of 4th Baron Gwydyr, of Gwydyr, County Carnarvon, on 26 August 1870.

Burrell was born at Langley Park, Beckenham. He was the son of Lindsey Merrik Peter Burrell and Frances Daniell, and the grandson of Sir Peter Burrell, 1st Baron Gwydyr.

He married Sophia Campbell in Ipswich on 10 December 1840, and they had one son, Sir Willoughby Burrell, 5th Baron Gwydyr (1841–1915).

Burrell later married Georgina Holford in Gloucestershire on 8 May 1856 and they had one daughter, Hon. Cicely Burrell (born 2 January 1858). Burrell lived at Stoke Park, Ipswich, and is buried at St Mary Church, Belstead, near Ipswich.

Before his death, Burrell was the oldest living member of the peerage.

Peerage of Great Britain
Preceded by Albyric Drummond-Willoughby	Baron Gwydyr; 1870–1909	Succeeded by Willoughby Burrell
