= Richard Welles, 7th Baron Welles =

English nobleman and soldier

- Born: c.1428
- Died: 12 March 1470; Stamford, Lincolnshire, Kingdom of England
- Spouse(s): Joan Willoughby, 7th Baroness Willoughby de Eresby
- Issue: Robert Welles, 8th Baron Willoughby de Eresby; Joan Welles, 9th Baroness Willoughby de Eresby
- Father: Lionel de Welles, 6th Baron Welles
- Mother: Joan Waterton

Richard Welles, 7th Baron Welles (c.1428–1470), was an English nobleman and soldier. From a Lancastrian family, he came to be on good terms with the Yorkist King Edward IV, but was later executed after being associated with a plot against Edward known as the "Welles Uprising".

== Family ==
Richard Welles was the only son of Lionel de Welles, 6th Baron Welles, and his first wife, Joan Waterton. He had four sisters of the whole blood:

- Cecily Welles, who married Sir Robert Willoughby of Parham, Suffolk and was the mother of Christopher Willoughby, 10th Baron Willoughby de Eresby.
- Margaret Welles (d. 13 July 1480), who first married Sir Thomas Dymoke (executed 12 March 1470), and then Robert Radcliffe, esquire.
- Eleanor Welles, who married Thomas Hoo, Baron Hoo and Hastings (d. 13 February 1455).
- Katherine Welles, who first married Sir Thomas de la Launde (executed 15 March 1469), and then Robert Tempest (d. 23 April 1509), esquire.

== Career ==
He married, by 9 January 1449, Joan Willoughby, in her own right Lady Willoughby, the only daughter and heiress of Robert Willoughby, 6th Baron Willoughby de Eresby. He was knighted shortly before 31 January 1453, on which date he had seisin of his wife’s lands, and was on various commissions in Lincolnshire in that year. On or before 15 March 1454 he was a privy councillor. He was summoned to Parliament from 26 May 1455 to 10 August 1469 by writs directed Ricardo Welles de Willughby, thus becoming Lord Willoughby. According to Hicks, having the expectation of the Welles and Waterton inheritances, 'he was destined to be the principal magnate in the Lincolnshire area'.

In his early years he was a supporter of the House of Lancaster, and for service against the Yorkists in Lincolnshire in 1459 was granted £40 yearly from forfeited lands on 21 March 1460. He was in Queen Margaret's army when it advanced on London and won the Second Battle of St Albans on 17 February 1461, and fought at Towton on 29 March 1461; after Towton it was wrongly reported that he had been slain. His father, slain at Towton, was attainted on 21 December 1461 by the victorious Yorkists, whereby all his honours were forfeited, and a result he did not immediately succeed his father in the barony of Welles; however, on 5 February 1462, he was able to obtain a pardon from Edward IV.

He had family connections to the Nevilles through both his first and second wives, and having changed sides in the conflict, assisted the Nevilles in the destruction of the Lancastrian forces in the north of England in 1464. He was with Edward IV at Dover, on 21 August 1463, and was among the Yorkist leaders under the command of John Neville, 1st Marquess of Montagu, who defeated the Lancastrians at the Battle of Hexham on 15 May 1464. He was amply rewarded by Edward IV, being granted his father's forfeited goods on 9 October 1464. On 11 July 1465 he had seisin of his father's forfeited estates. In June 1467 he was fully restored in blood by an Act of Parliament which reversed his father's attainder, by which he acquired 'the additional title of Lord Welles'. In 1468, by order of the King, he was confirmed in his rights against competing claims to his father's lands by his stepmother, Margaret Beaufort, Duchess of Somerset, and his half-brother, John Welles.

Although he had recovered his inheritance, Lord Welles had not achieved dominance in Lincolnshire, where he shared power with Humphrey Bourchier, 1st Baron Cromwell, a kinsman of Edward IV, and with Sir Thomas Burgh, Edward IV's Master of Horse. In February 1470 his only son Sir Robert Welles, attacked Burgh's house, Gainsborough Old Hall. This incident is thought by some historians to have been a plot by the Earl of Warwick to provoke a reaction from the King; however, other historians consider it merely a 'private war'. The King summoned Lord Welles and his brother-in-law, Sir Thomas Dymoke, to London to account for their actions. At first Welles pleaded illness; he afterwards came to London, but took sanctuary at Westminster Abbey, from which he was lured by the promise of a pardon, which was granted on 3 March 1470. By this time Lord Welles' son, Sir Robert, had openly declared for Warwick and George, Duke of Clarence, and after pardoning Lord Welles and Dymoke, the King kept them under restraint while he marched north to personally suppress the Lincolnshire rebellion. Sir Robert Welles refused to lay down his arms, whereupon the King had Lord Welles and Dymoke executed at Queen's Cross in Stamford on 12 March 1470. Sir Robert gave battle at Losecoat Field, but was defeated, and executed at Doncaster on 19 March. Both were attainted, and since Sir Robert had died without issue, the King bestowed the Welles and Willoughby lands on one of his loyal supporters, Sir Richard Hastings, who had married Lord Welles's daughter, Joan, save for lands around Lilford Hall which were acquired by William Browne (Mayor of the Calais Staple) in 1473.

The attainders of Lord Welles and Sir Robert Welles were both later reversed in the first Parliament of Henry VII.

== Marriages and issue ==
Welles married firstly, by 9 January 1449, Joan Willoughby, in her own right Lady Willoughby, the only daughter and heiress of Robert Willoughby, 6th Baron Willoughby de Eresby, by his first wife, Elizabeth Montagu, daughter of John Montagu, 3rd Earl of Salisbury, by whom he had a son and daughter:

- Robert Welles, 8th Baron Willoughby de Eresby, who married Elizabeth Bourchier (d.1470), the daughter of John Bourchier, 1st Baron Berners, and Margery Berners, daughter and heiress of Richard Berners, esquire. She survived him by only a few months, and was buried by his side in the church of the Whitefriars in Doncaster. She left a will dated 2 October 1470.
- Joan Welles, 9th Baroness Willoughby de Eresby, who married Sir Richard Hastings, the second son of Leonard Hastings and Alice Camoys, daughter of Thomas de Camoys, 1st Baron Camoys, by his first wife, Elizabeth Louches, the daughter and heiress of William Louches. He was the brother of William Hastings, 1st Baron Hastings and Sir Ralph Hastings. They had a son, Anthony Hastings, who predeceased his father.

Welles' first wife was living 11 May 1461, but died shortly before 13 February 1462.

He married secondly Margery Strangways, widow of the Neville retainer, John Ingleby, and daughter of Sir James Strangways of Harlsey in Osmotherley, Yorkshire, by his first wife, Elizabeth Darcy, daughter and heiress of Philip Darcy, 6th Baron Darcy. They had no issue. On 8 May 1474 she was said to have been about to take the veil.

== See also ==
- The White Queen (miniseries)
