= Joan Welles, 9th Baroness Willoughby de Eresby =

- Died: before 23 January 1475
- Spouse(s): Sir Richard Hastings
- Issue: Anthony Hastings
- Father: Richard Welles, 7th Baron Welles
- Mother: Joan Willoughby, 7th Baroness Willoughby de Eresby

Joan Welles, de jure 9th Baroness Willoughby de Eresby (d. before 23 January 1475), inherited the baronies of Welles and Willoughby at the death of her brother, Robert Welles, 8th Baron Willoughby de Eresby, in 1470.

== Family ==
Joan Welles was the daughter of Richard Welles, 7th Baron Welles, and his first wife, Joan Willoughby, in her own right Lady Willoughby, daughter and heir of Robert Willoughby, 6th Baron Willoughby de Eresby, and his first wife, Elizabeth Montagu, daughter of John Montagu, 3rd Earl of Salisbury. She had an only brother, Robert Welles, 8th Baron Willoughby de Eresby.

== Career ==
Shortly before 1 June 1470, she married Sir Richard Hastings, a committed supporter of the House of York. Joan Welles was heir to her brother, Robert Welles, 8th Baron Willoughby de Eresby. However her inheritance was complicated by the fact that, as the result of an anti-Yorkist uprising in Lincolnshire, Joan Welles' father, Richard Welles, 7th Baron Welles, and her brother, Sir Robert, had both been beheaded by order of Edward IV within a week of each other, her father on 12 March 1470, and her brother on 19 March. A month later, on 25 April 1470, the King seized Sir Robert Welles' lands, but on 1 June 1470, granted them to Joan and her now husband, Sir Richard Hastings, giving them licence to enter all the lands 'which on the death of her father and brother, both tenants-in-chief, should descend to her'. According to modern doctrine, Joan also inherited the baronies of Willoughby and Welles after her brother's execution.

Joan Welles died about 1474/5. The exact date of her death is not known; however she likely died shortly before her father and brother were attainted, five years after their executions, by the Parliament of January–March 1475. As a result of the attainders, all their honours were forfeited, including the baronies of Welles and Willoughby, which should have been inherited, respectively, after Joan Welles' death, by her uncle of the half blood, John Welles, 1st Viscount Welles, and her second cousin, Christopher Willoughby, 10th Baron Willoughby de Eresby. According to some historians, the attainders were passed by Parliament in order to enable Edward IV to grant Joan Welles' lands after her death to her husband, 'the trusted Yorkist Sir Richard Hastings', and accordingly, on 23 January 1475, the King granted Hastings a life interest in the greater part of the Welles and Willoughby estates. Moreover, Hastings was summoned to Parliament from 14 November 1482 to 9 December 1483 by writs directed Ricardo Hastyng de Wellys, whereby he is held to have become either Lord Hastings of Welles, or Lord Welles.

Under Henry VII, the attainders of Joan Welles' father and brother, as well as the attainder of her uncle, John Welles, were all reversed by the Parliament of 1485/6. John Welles was still living, and with the reversal of his attainder became Lord Welles. Joan Welles' former husband, Sir Richard Hastings, was thus no longer recognized as Lord Welles. In compensation, however, it was enacted in the same year that Hastings should be entitled, for life, to all the lands which had belonged to Joan Welles' father. Having received this grant, until his death Hastings continued to be styled, and styled himself, Lord Willoughby, to the exclusion of Christopher Willoughby, 10th Baron Willoughby de Eresby, who should have inherited the title.

== Marriage and issue ==
Joan Welles married, shortly before 1 June 1470, Sir Richard Hastings (d.1503), by whom she had a son, Anthony Hastings. Sir Richard Hastings was the son of Leonard Hastings and Alice Camoys, daughter of Thomas de Camoys, 1st Baron Camoys, by his first wife, Elizabeth Louches, the daughter and heir of William Louches. He was a younger brother of William Hastings, 1st Baron Hastings. After the death of Joan Welles, he married Joan Romondbye (d. 20 March 1505), widow of Richard Pigot, (died c. 15 April 1483), Serjeant-at-law, by whom he had no issue. He left a will dated 18 March 1502, proved 5 October 1503.

== Notes ==
Peerage of England
Preceded by Robert Welles	Baron Willoughby de Eresby; 1470–1475	Succeeded by Christopher Willoughby
