= Margaret Beauchamp of Bletso =

English noblewoman (c. 1410–1482)

- Lady St John; Duchess of Somerset; Lady Welles
- Born: c. 1410
- Died: before 3 June 1482 (aged 71–72)
- Spouses: Sir Oliver St John; John Beaufort, 1st Duke of Somerset; Lionel de Welles, 6th Baron Welles
- Issue: Sir John St John; Oliver St John; Edith St John; Mary St John; Elizabeth St John; Agnes St John; Margaret St John; Lady Margaret Beaufort; John Welles, 1st Viscount Welles
- Father: Sir John Beauchamp
- Mother: Edith Stourton

Margaret Beauchamp (c. 1410 – before 3 June 1482) was the oldest daughter of Sir John Beauchamp of Bletsoe, and his second wife, Edith Stourton. She was the maternal grandmother of Henry VII.

== Biography ==
Margaret Beauchamp, born about 1410, was the daughter of Sir John Beauchamp of Bletsoe, Bedfordshire, and his second wife, Edith Stourton (d. 13 June 1441), daughter of Sir John Stourton of Stourton, Wiltshire.

In 1421, she became heiress to her only brother, John Beauchamp, who died young and unmarried, from whom she inherited the manors of Lydiard Tregoze in Wiltshire, Ashmore in Dorset, and Bletsoe and Keysoe in Bedfordshire, and, according to modern doctrine, the right to any barony of Beauchamp created by summons to Parliament directed to her great-great-grandfather, Roger Beauchamp, 1st Baron Beauchamp (died 3 January 1380) of Bletsoe.

== Marriages and children ==
She married firstly Sir Oliver St John (died 4 March 1437), son and heir of Sir John St John and Isabel Paveley, daughter and heiress of Sir John Paveley, by whom she had two sons and five daughters:

- Sir John St John (died 1513/14) of Bletsoe, who married Alice Bradshagh, daughter of Sir Thomas Bradshagh, of Haigh, Lancashire. They were great-grandparents of Thomas FitzGerald, 10th Earl of Kildare and also George Boleyn's wife, Jane Boleyn, Viscountess Rochford; her mother was their granddaughter, Alice, daughter of John St John and Sybil Verch Morgan.
- Oliver St John (died 1497), esquire, of Lydiard Tregoze, Wiltshire, who married Elizabeth Scrope, widow successively of Sir John Bigod (died 1461) of Settrington, Yorkshire, and Henry Rochford (died 25 October 1470), esquire, of Stoke Rochford, Lincolnshire, and daughter of Henry Scrope, 4th Baron Scrope of Bolton, and Elizabeth le Scrope, daughter of John Scrope, 4th Baron Scrope of Masham.
- Edith St John, who married Geoffrey Pole esquire. Their son, Richard Pole, was an ardent supporter of his maternal first cousin Henry VII of England. He was created a Knight of the Garter and was married to Margaret Pole, Countess of Salisbury, a member of the House of Plantagenet, which helped to reinforce the Tudor alliance between the houses of Lancaster and York.
- Mary St John, who married Sir Richard Frogenall.
- Elizabeth St John (died before 3 July 1494) who married firstly, before 2 April 1450, as his second wife, William la Zouche, 5th Baron Zouche (died 25 December 1462) of Harringworth, and secondly, before 10 December 1471, as his second wife, John Scrope, 5th Baron Scrope of Bolton (died 17 August 1498).
- Agnes St John, who married David Malpas.
- Margaret St John, Abbess of Shaftesbury.

She married secondly, in 1439, John Beaufort, 1st Duke of Somerset, by whom she had one daughter:

- Lady Margaret Beaufort, Countess of Richmond and Derby, who married Edmund Tudor, 1st Earl of Richmond, by whom she was the mother of Henry VII of the House of Tudor.

She married thirdly, by licence dated 14 April 1447, as his second wife, Lionel de Welles, 6th Baron Welles, by whom she had one son:

- John Welles, 1st Viscount Welles, who married Cecily of York, the daughter of Edward IV of England.

She is buried with her second husband at Wimborne Minster in Dorset.

== Fictional portrayals ==
Margaret Beauchamp figures prominently in the 2010 Philippa Gregory novel The Red Queen, and was played by Frances Tomelty in the 2013 television adaptation The White Queen. Gregory also includes Beauchamp in her 2011 prequel novel The Lady of the Rivers.
