= John Welles, 1st Viscount Welles =

English nobleman (c. 1450–1498)

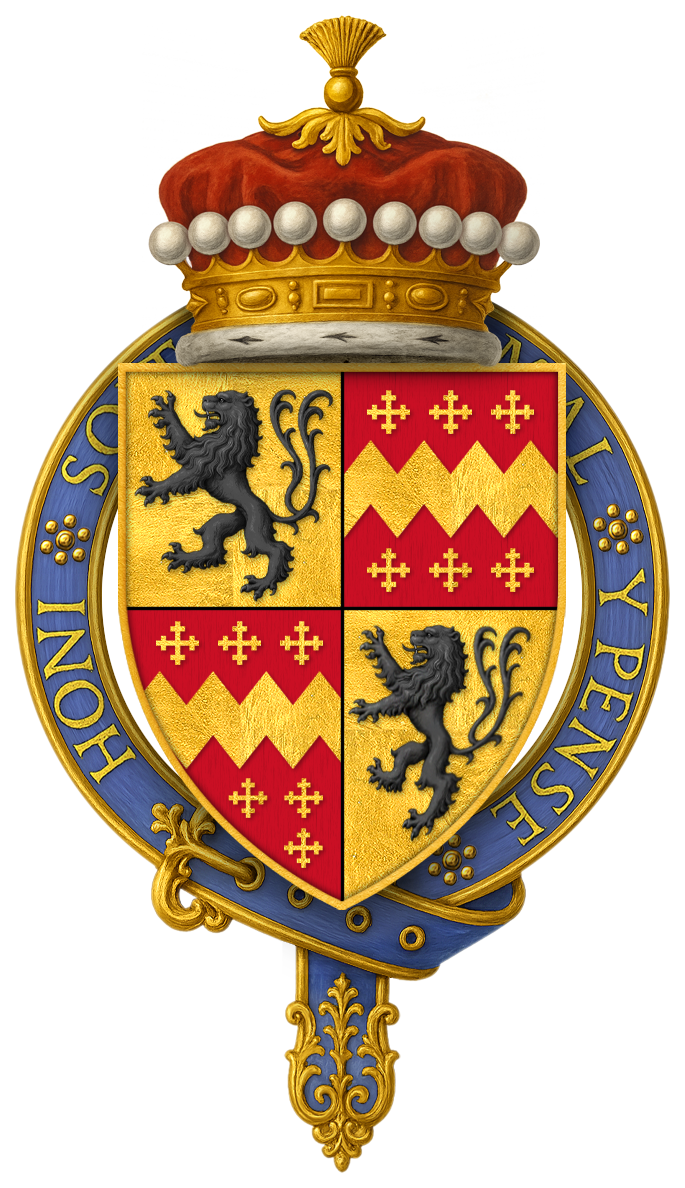
Arms of Sir John Welles, 1st Viscount Welles, KG

John (de) Welles, 1st Viscount Welles, KG (c. 1450 – 9 February 1498) was an English Lancastrian nobleman who was made a Knight of the Garter. He was the son of Lionel de Welles, 6th Baron Welles and Margaret Beauchamp of Bletso. He was the half-brother of Lady Margaret Beaufort and an uncle of Henry VII of England.

John died and was buried in February 1498 in Westminster, England.

== War of the Roses ==
John's father, Lionel de Welles, 6th Baron Welles, was slain at the Battle of Towton in 1461, and his elder half-brother, Richard Welles, 7th Baron Welles, inherited the Welles barony. Richard Welles and his son and heir, Robert Welles, 8th Baron Willoughby de Eresby, were both beheaded in March 1470 for involvement in an uprising against Edward IV in Lincolnshire. After the death of Robert Welles, the Welles barony was inherited, in her own right, by his only sister, Joan Welles. However shortly after Joan Welles' death in about 1474/5, both her father, Richard Welles, and her brother, Robert Welles, were attainted by Act of Parliament, five years after their executions. As a result of the attainders, John Welles was not able to enjoy the title to the Welles barony until the attainders were reversed by Parliament under Henry VII.

A pardon in 1478 did not prevent Welles from participating in Buckingham's rebellion. He escaped to his nephew, the future Henry VII, in Brittany after its collapse. Henry knighted him on 7 August 1485 and he was created Viscount sometime between 15 July and 25 November 1486 and given substantial grants.

== Marriage ==
Some time in December 1487 John married Cecily of York, the daughter of Edward IV and Elizabeth Woodville, making him a member of the royal family. Cecily had been born on 20 March 1469 in Westminster, England, and died on 24 August 1507 either on the Isle of Wight or at Hatfield. The apparent aim of Henry VII was to reward his uncle for loyalty and to keep Cecily from marrying a more ambitious man. John and Cecily had two children, Elizabeth Welles (c. 1489–1498) and Anne Welles (c. 1491 – c. 1499).

He died 9 February 1498 in the City of London. Anne died soon after. His will left almost all of his property to his widow and is as follows:

1499 June 22, The Will of John, Lord Welles In the name of oure Lorde Jeshu, Amen. I, John, Viscounte lorde Wellis, uncle to the Kynge, oure soveraigne lorde, and brodre to the right noble prynces, Margaret, countes of Richemond, naturall and dere modre to oure said soveregne lord, beyng of goode and hole memory, ye viij daie of February, the yere of oure Lorde God 1498, and in the xiiij yere of the regne of our saide soverayne lorde, make this my testament. My bodie to be buried in suche place as [to] the kynge, the quene, my lady, his moder, and my lady, my wife, shalbe thought, most convenyent, and the costis and charge of the same burying, the obsequyes, masses, funeralles and all oder thynges therto convenyent and necessarie. And also I remyt the makyng of my tumbe to the ordre and discrecionn of my saide soverayne lady the quene, my lady his modre, and my wife. And after these charges and costis aforesaid had and done, l will that all the dettis nowe by me dewe or to be dewe be treuly contented and paied. And I will that to the honour of Almighty God in the aulter afore which my bodie shall next lie my executors shall delyver a pair of candelstickes of silver, a masse booke covered with clothe of goolde, a chales of silver and gilte, a vestament of blewe velvet enbrodered with my armes, a pair of litle cruettes of silver and parcellis gilte, and a crosse of silver p[arcell] gilt, which 1 will do remayne there to serve Almyghty God with for ever and in noo oder place. Also I geve and bequethe to my dere beloved lady and wife Cecille, for terme of her lif, all my castelles, manors, landes and tenements, aswell suche as I have purchased as all odre duryng only her life, whome I trust above all oder, that if my goodes and catallis wilnot suffice for the performance of this my laste will, that she will thenne of the revenues of the profittes of my inheritance perform this my laste will. Also I will that a preste be founde for ever after my said wifes decease to sey masse daily for my sowle and all Cristen sowles at the said aulter of the yerely revenues of my purchased landes, and over which my saide lady hath promysed me faithfully to purchase to the same entent if my saide purchased landes suffice not therto. And I will yt suche residue as shall fortune to be of my goodes that my saide dere beloved lady aud wife have theym to her owne use. And I make executors the saide Cecill, my dere beloved wife, and Sr Raynold Bray, knyght, and in my mooste humble wise beseche my said soverayne lorde the kyng and the quenes grace, my lady the kynges modre, to be supervisours

== See also ==
- Lionel de Welles, 6th Baron Welles
- John de Welles, 5th Baron Welles
- Governor Thomas Welles
- Baron Welles
