= Joan Willoughby, 7th Baroness Willoughby de Eresby =

English baroness

- Born: c.1425
- Died: before 13 February 1462
- Spouse(s): Richard Welles, 7th Baron Welles
- Issue: Robert Welles, 8th Baron Willoughby de Eresby; Joan Welles, 9th Baroness Willoughby de Eresby
- Father: Robert Willoughby, 6th Baron Willoughby de Eresby
- Mother: Elizabeth Montagu

Joan Willoughby, de jure suo jure 7th Baroness Willoughby de Eresby (c.1425 - d. before 13 February 1462) was an English baroness in her own right.

== Career ==
Joan Willoughby, born circa 1425, was the daughter of Robert Willoughby, 6th Baron Willoughby de Eresby, and his first wife, Elizabeth Montagu, daughter of John Montagu, 3rd Earl of Salisbury, by his first wife, Maud Francis, daughter of Adam Francis, Lord Mayor of London. On 20 September 1424 the 6th Baron had been granted, for service in the wars in France, the comté of Vendome, and 4 October 1430 the comté of Beaumont-sur-Oise, with remainder to his heirs male. At his death on 25 July 1452 without male issue, these titles became extinct. However his daughter, Joan, according to modern doctrine, succeeded to the title of Baroness Willoughby.

Her husband, Richard Welles, 7th Baron Welles, in consequence of their marriage, was summoned to Parliament from 26 May 1455 to 10 August 1469 as Ricardo Welles de Willughby, thus becoming Lord Willoughby.

Joan Willoughby was still living 11 May 1461, but had died by 13 February 1462.

== Marriage and issue ==
She married, likely before 1446, Richard Welles, 7th Baron Welles (beheaded 12 March 1470), by whom she had a son and a daughter:

- Robert Welles, 8th Baron Willoughby de Eresby (beheaded 19 March 1470, before Battle of Stamford).
- Joan Welles, 9th Baroness Willoughby de Eresby.

== Notes ==
Peerage of England
Preceded by Robert Willoughby	Baron Willoughby de Eresby; 1452–1462	Succeeded by Robert Welles
