= Robert Willoughby, 6th Baron Willoughby de Eresby =

English nobleman and military commander

Robert Willoughby
- 6th Baron Willoughby de Eresby
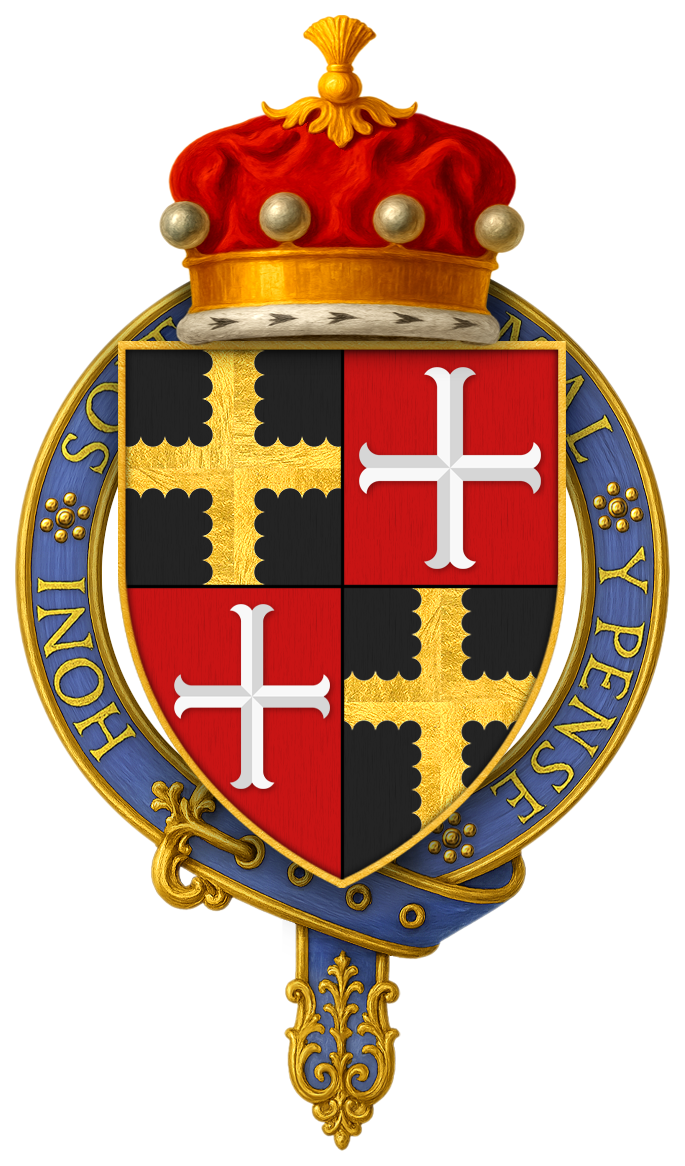
- Quartered arms of Sir Robert Willoughby, 6th Baron Willoughby d'Eresby, KG
- Born: c. 1385
- Died: 25 July 1452 (aged about 67)
- Buried: Mettingham, Suffolk
- Spouses: Elizabeth Montagu; Maud Stanhope
- Issue: Joan, 7th Baroness Willoughby
- Parents: William Willoughby, 5th Baron Willoughby; Lucy le Strange

Robert Willoughby, 6th Baron Willoughby de Eresby KG (c. 1385 – 25 July 1452) was an English nobleman and military commander in the Hundred Years' War.

== Family ==
Robert Willoughby was the son of William Willoughby, 5th Baron Willoughby de Eresby, and his first wife, Lucy le Strange, daughter of Roger le Strange, 5th Baron Strange of Knockin (Shropshire), by Aline, daughter of Edmund FitzAlan, 9th Earl of Arundel. He had a younger brother and three sisters:

- Sir Thomas Willoughby, who married Joan Arundel, daughter and co-heiress of Sir Richard Arundel by his wife, Alice.
- Elizabeth Willoughby, who married Henry Beaumont, 5th Baron Beaumont.
- Margery Willoughby, who married William FitzHugh, 4th Baron FitzHugh.
- Margaret Willoughby, who married Sir Thomas Skipwith.

== Career ==
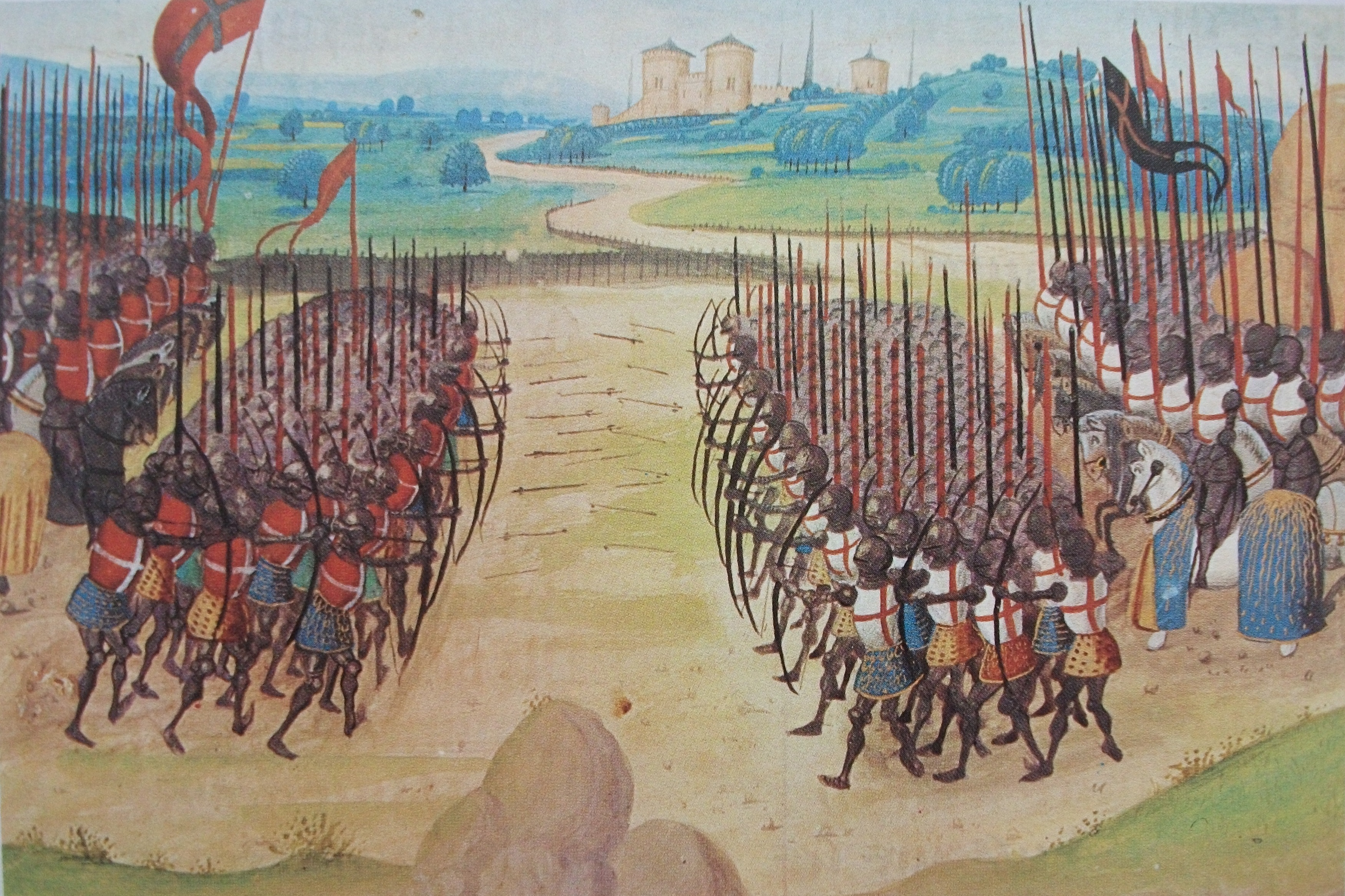
Battle of Agincourt from the Chroniques d’Enguerrand de Monstrelet (early 15th century)

Willoughby's father, the 5th Baron, died on 4 December 1409.

Willoughby, aged 24, succeeded him in the title, and had seisin of his lands 8 February 1410. In 1412/13 he served with Thomas of Lancaster, 1st Duke of Clarence, on his expedition to Normandy and Bordeaux. In April 1415 he attended the great council which approved plans for King Henry V's invasion of France, and on 5 August 1415 he was among the peers who tried Richard, Earl of Cambridge, and Lord Scrope after the discovery of the Southampton Plot on the eve of invasion.

He crossed to France with the King's army, and was present at the taking of Harfleur and at the Battle of Agincourt.

At the death on 29 September 1416 of Isabel, widow of William de Ufford, 2nd Earl of Suffolk, he succeeded to the castle and town of Orford and the manors of Parham and Ufford in Suffolk. In December 1417 he was made a Knight of the Garter. From 1417, according to Cokayne, Complete Peerage, he 'served continually for many years in the French wars'. He was at the siege of Caen in 1417, the siege of Rouen in July 1418, and the siege of Melun from July to November 1420. He accompanied the King back to England in 1421, and was Chief Butler at the coronation of Catherine of Valois on 23 February. According to Cokayne he was at the siege of Meaux from October 1421 to May 1422; however historian Gerald Harriss considers his presence at Meaux uncertain as he was in England gathering reinforcements to take to France in May 1422.

On 31 July and 1 August 1423 he participated in the relief of Cravant, personally forcing the passage of the bridge over the Yonne river. He was with John, Duke of Bedford, then Regent, at the surrender of Ivry on 15 August and at the Battle of Verneuil on 17 August 1424, where he and Sir John Fastolf jointly captured the Duke of Alençon. For these services he was rewarded with a grant, on 20 September 1424, of the comté of Vendôme.

In July and August 1425 he was with Thomas Montagu, 4th Earl of Salisbury, at the siege of Le Mans, thus completing the conquest of Maine. In July of the following year he was with Richard Beauchamp, 13th Earl of Warwick, at Bonneval. In February 1427/8 he was with the Earl of Suffolk at Dreux.

On 17 June 1429 he had licence to accompany Cardinal Henry Beaufort on a crusade against the Hussites. However the forces assembled for the crusade were sent instead to France to assist the Duke of Bedford after the English were defeated at the Battle of Patay on 18 June 1429. He played a major role in Henry VI's coronation expedition in 1430. During this phase of the war the English suffered reverses, and lost ground to the south of Normandy, and on 4 October 1430 Willoughby was granted the comté of Beaumont-sur-Oise in compensation for the comté of Vendôme.

Willoughby was appointed the King's Lieutenant in Lower Normandy before February 1432, where he had mixed success, suffering defeats by the French at Vivoin and the siege of Saint-Céneri-le-Gérei in 1432, but capturing St. Valéry after a siege in July–August 1433. He was Captain of Bayeux in 1433, and of Pont de l'Arche about 1434. In July 1435 he raised a force of 2000 men in England, and with Lords Talbot and Scales besieged Saint-Denis, capturing it in October. He was given command of Paris in October 1435 when Talbot left for Rouen, but for lack of support from English forces was compelled to surrender the Bastille to the French on 17 April 1436.

Willoughby campaigned for the last time in 1437, when Warwick personally requested that he accompany Warwick to Normandy. Willoughby had returned to England by the end of 1438. On 17 July 1439 he had licence to make a pilgrimage to the Holy Land, and according to Harriss, may well have done so as his name does not reappear in English records until May 1443.

He is said to have been made Master of the King's Hart Hounds in 1441–2. In March 1445 he was one of the peers who escorted King Henry VI's wife, Margaret of Anjou, to England. In his latter years he was involved in conflict over control of Lincolnshire with Sir William Tailboys and his allies.

Willoughby died 25 July 1452, aged about 67, without male issue, and was buried in the chantry college at Mettingham, Suffolk. All traces of his tomb have disappeared.

Willoughby's only child, Joan, married Richard Welles, 7th Baron Welles (d.1470), by whom she had a son, Sir Robert Welles, and a daughter, Joan Welles. At Willoughby's death, his lands and title descended to his daughter and son-in-law, Richard de Welles, 7th Baron Welles.

== Marriages and issue ==
Willoughby married firstly, before 21 February 1421, Elizabeth Montagu, daughter of John Montagu, 3rd Earl of Salisbury, by whom he had an only daughter, Joan Willoughby, who married Richard Welles, 7th Baron Welles.

He married secondly, before 8 January 1449, Maud Stanhope, daughter of Sir Richard Stanhope of Rampton, Nottinghamshire, by his second wife, Maud Cromwell, daughter of Ralph Cromwell, 2nd Baron Cromwell, but had no issue by her. His widow married secondly, Sir Thomas Neville, second son of Richard Neville, 5th Earl of Salisbury, slain 30 December 1460 at the Battle of Wakefield, and thirdly, Sir Gervase Clifton, beheaded 6 May 1471 after the Battle of Tewkesbury. Lady Maud alleged that Sir Gervase Clifton had 'wasted and destroyed' more than £1000 worth of jewels, plate and household goods which she brought to the marriage. She died 30 August 1497, and was buried at the Collegiate Church at Tattershall, Lincolnshire.

== Notes ==
Peerage of England
Preceded by William Willoughby	Baron Willoughby de Eresby; 1409–1452	Succeeded by Joan Willoughby
