= Robert Booth (priest) =

Dean of Bristol (1662–1730)

- Dean of Bristol
- Appointed: 1708
- Term ended: 1730
- Predecessor: George Royse
- Successor: Samuel Creswicke
- Other post: Archdeacon of Durham
- Previous post: Archdeacon of Durham

Orders
- Ordination: 1685

Personal details
- Born: 1662 Dunham Massey, Cheshire
- Died: 8 August 1730 (aged 68) The Deanery, Bristol
- Buried: Bristol Cathedral
- Denomination: Anglican
- Spouse: Ann Booth, Mary Hales
- Education: Christ Church, Oxford
- Coat of arms

Robert Booth (1662–1730), an aristocratic 18th-century Anglican priest, served as Archdeacon of Durham from 1691 and also as Dean of Bristol from 1708.

== Early life and family ==
The 6th son of George Booth, 1st Baron Delamer and Lady Elizabeth Grey, eldest daughter of General the Lord Stamford, he was educated at Christ Church, Oxford, graduating as Master of Arts, before receiving, in 1712, the degree of Doctor of Divinity. He married twice, firstly to his distant cousin Ann Booth, daughter of Sir Robert Booth, Lord Chief Justice of Ireland and his second wife Susannah Oxenden, who bore him one son (Barton Booth), and secondly to Mary Hales, who bore 14 children: their youngest son, Nathaniel Booth, succeeded in 1758 as the 4th and last Baron Delamer. His son Robert was MP for Bodmin.

== Ministry ==
Booth was ordained a deacon at Oxford in 1685 by Bishop John Fell. He was appointed Rector of Satterleigh and Warkleigh in Devon, then collated Archdeacon of Durham on 15 May 1691, in October of the same year Booth was presented to a family advowson as Rector of Thornton-le-Moors in the diocese of Chester. Seventeen years later, on 20 May 1708, he was promoted Dean of Bristol and installed in the cathedral on 20 June 1708. Dr Booth held both offices until his death on 8 August 1730, aged 68, being buried at Bristol Cathedral.

== Styles and titles ==
- The Honourable Robert Booth (1662–1685)
- The Honourable and Reverend Robert Booth (1685–1691)
- The Honourable and Venerable Robert Booth (1691–1708)
- The Honourable and Very Reverend Robert Booth (1708–1712)
- The Honourable and Very Reverend Dr Robert Booth (1712–1730)

== See also ==
- Baron Delamer

Church of England titles
Preceded by Denis Granville	Archdeacon of Durham; 1691–1730	Succeeded by George Sayer
Preceded by George Royse	Dean of Bristol; 1708–1730	Succeeded by Samuel Creswicke
