= Simon Robson (priest) =

Simon Robson was Dean of Bristol from 1598 to 1617.

Robson was born in West Morton and educated at St John's College, Cambridge. He held livings at Stainton, County Durham, Birkin, Blyborough and Weare, Somerset.

He died in May 1617.

Church of England titles
Preceded by Anthony Watson	Dean of Bristol; 1598–1617	Succeeded by Edward Chetwynd
