= Viscount Cullen =

Viscount Cullen of Tipperary was a title in the Peerage of Ireland created on 11 August 1642, along with the title Baron Cullen, for Charles Cokayne.

== Derbyshire ==
The ancient family of Cokayne had its origins in Ashbourne, Derbyshire. Charles Cokayne High Sheriff of Northamptonshire in 1636, was the son of Sir William Cokayne of Rushton Hall, Northamptonshire, Lord Mayor of London in 1619. The family seat was Rushton Hall.

On the death of the 6th Viscount in 1810, both titles became dormant. Although the issue male of the 1st Viscount thus became extinct, the titles devolved by special remainder, through the female line, upon Albemarle Bertie, 9th Earl of Lindsey, who, however, never claimed them. They became extinct upon the death of Montague Bertie, 12th Earl of Lindsey, in 1938.

=== George Cokayne—The Complete Peerage ===
Mary Anne Cokayne, daughter of William Cokayne, brother of the fifth Viscount, married William Adams. Their son George Adams changed his name to George Cokayne in 1873 and his son Brien was created Baron Cullen of Ashbourne in 1920.

== Viscounts Cullen (1642) ==
- Charles Cokayne, 1st Viscount Cullen (1602–1661)
- Brien Cokayne, 2nd Viscount Cullen (1631–1687)
- Charles Cokayne, 3rd Viscount Cullen (1658–1688)
- Charles Cokayne, 4th Viscount Cullen (1687–1716)
- Charles Cokayne, 5th Viscount Cullen (1710–1802)
- Borlase Cokayne, 6th Viscount Cullen (1740–1810)
- Albemarle Bertie, 9th Earl of Lindsey, 7th Viscount Cullen (1744–1818)
- George Augustus Frederick Albemarle Bertie, 10th Earl of Lindsey, 8th Viscount Cullen (1814–1877)
- Montague Peregrine Bertie, 11th Earl of Lindsey, 9th Viscount Cullen (1815–1899)
- Montague Peregrine Albemarle Bertie, 12th Earl of Lindsey, 10th Viscount Cullen (1861–1938)

== See also ==
- Cokayne Baronets
