= Montague Bertie, 12th Earl of Lindsey =

English nobleman

The Right Honourable The Earl of Lindsey DL

Personal details
- Born: Montague Peregrine Albemarle Bertie; 3 September 1861
- Died: 2 January 1938 (aged 76)
- Spouse: Millicent Cox (m. 1890; died 1931)
- Relations: David Liddell-Grainger (grandson); Charles Gordon, 11th Marquess of Huntly (cousin); Lord Douglas Gordon (cousin) Ian Liddel-Grainger (Great Grandson)
- Children: Lady Muriel Felicia Vere Bertie
- Parent(s): Montague Bertie, 11th Earl of Lindsey; Felicia Elizabetha Welby
- Education: Eton College
- Alma mater: Magdalene College, Cambridge

Montague Peregrine Albemarle Bertie, 12th Earl of Lindsey, DL (3 September 1861 – 2 January 1938), styled Lord Bertie from 1877 until 1899, was an English nobleman, the only son of Montague Bertie, 11th Earl of Lindsey.

== Early life ==
Bertie was born on 3 September 1861. He was the only son of Montague Bertie, 11th Earl of Lindsey and the former Felicia Elizabetha Welby, the second daughter of Rev. John Earle Welby, Rector of Hareston (and son of Sir William Earle Welby, 1st Baronet) and Felicia Eliza Hole (a daughter of Rev. George Hole, Bishop of Norwich).

His father succeeded to the earldom in 1877 upon the death of his uncle, George Bertie, 10th Earl of Lindsey, who died unmarried. His paternal aunt, Lady Charlotte, was a prominent linguist who married twice, first to John Josiah Guest, 1st Baronet, and, after his death, to Charles Schreiber, MP for Cheltenham and Poole. His paternal grandparents were Albemarle Bertie, 9th Earl of Lindsey and Charlotte Susannah Elizabeth Layard (a daughter of the Very Reverend Charles Layard, Dean of Bristol). After his grandfather's death, his grandmother remarried to the Rev. William Peter Pegus, with whom she had Maria Antoinetta Pegus. His aunt Maria married Charles Gordon, 10th Marquess of Huntly. Among his cousins were Charles Gordon, 11th Marquess of Huntly and Lord Douglas Gordon.

He was educated at Eton and Magdalene College, Cambridge.

== Career ==
On 30 March 1881, he was appointed a second lieutenant in the Northampton and Rutland Militia (later the 4th Battn, The Northamptonshire Regiment). Between 1885 and 1888, he served as an aide-de-camp to Lord Carrington, then Governor of New South Wales.

Lord Bertie was promoted Captain on 29 June 1889, and resigned his commission on 4 May 1891. On 8 September 1893, he was appointed a deputy lieutenant of Lincolnshire.

In 1899, he succeeded his father as Earl of Lindsey.

== Personal life ==
While in Australia, Lord Bertie met and on 12 February 1890 married Millicent Cox (d. 1931), the eldest daughter of the prominent Australian surgeon Dr. James Charles Cox. Together, they were the parents of one daughter:

- Lady Muriel Felicia Vere Bertie (d. 1981); married Henry Liddell-Grainger in 1922 and had issue, including David Liddell-Grainger; after his death, married Sir Malcolm Barclay-Harvey in 1938. She was a grandmother of Ian Liddel-Grainger

Lord Lindsay died on 2 January 1938. Upon his death, the Earldom of Lindsey passed to his fifth cousin thrice removed, the 8th Earl of Abingdon, while the Irish titles of Baron and Viscount Cullen (which he never claimed) became extinct.

Peerage of England
Preceded by Montague Bertie	Earl of Lindsey; 1899–1938	Succeeded by Montague Towneley-Bertie
