= Richard Thompson (priest) =

British clergyman

Richard Thompson, D.D. (b Wakefield 11 March 1648; d Bristol 29 November 1685) was Dean of Bristol from 1684 until his death.

Thompson was born in Wakefield and educated at Magdalene College, Cambridge. He held livings at Duston, Bedminster and Redcliffe.

Church of England titles
Preceded by Samuel Crossman	Dean of Bristol; 1684–1685	Succeeded by William Levett
