= Layard =

Layard is a surname. Notable people with the surname include:

- Austen Henry Layard (1817–1894), British archaeologist, author, and politician
- Charles Peter Layard (1806–1893), first Mayor of Colombo
- Charles Layard (judge) (1849–1916), Chief Justice of Ceylon
- Daniel Peter Layard (1721–1802), English physician
- Edgar Leopold Layard (1824–1900), British ornithologist
- John Layard (1891–1974), English anthropologist and psychologist
- Nina Frances Layard (1853–1935), English poet and antiquary
- Richard Layard, Baron Layard (born 1934), British economist

== See also ==
- Layard Theatre, Canford School, Dorset, England
- Layard's palm squirrel (Funambulus layardi), a rodent
- Layard's parakeet (Psittacula calthrapae), a parrot
- Layard's warbler (Sylvia layardi), an Old World warbler
- Layard's white-eye (Zosterops explorator), a passerine bird
