= Edgar Leopold Layard =

British diplomat and ornithologist

Edgar Leopold Layard CMG, FZS, MBOU
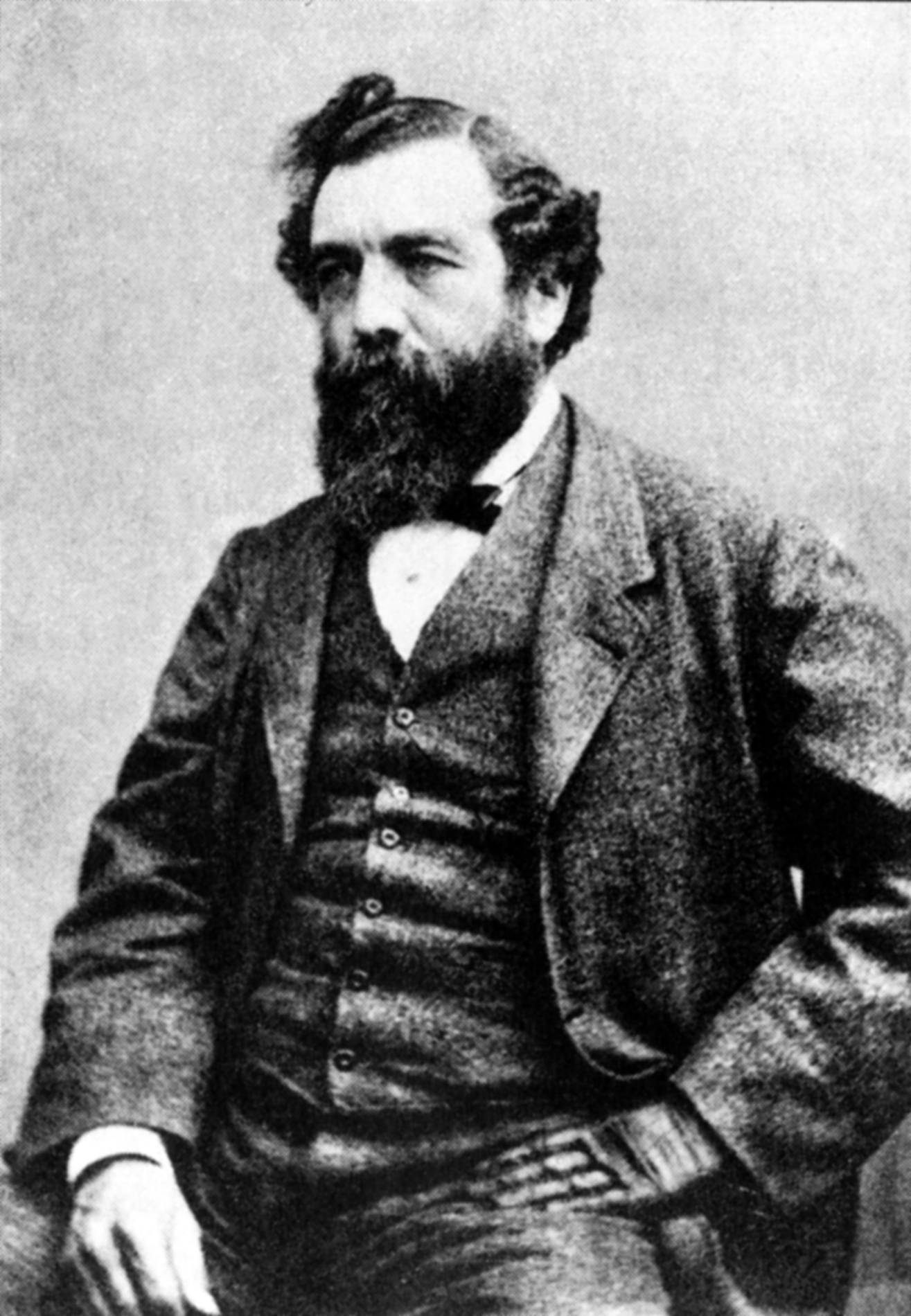
- Born: 23 July 1824; Florence, Italy
- Died: 1 January 1900 (aged 75); Budleigh Salterton, Devon, England
- Occupation: Diplomat
- Known for: Naturalism; Ornithology
- Notable work: The Birds of South Africa
- Spouses: Barbara Anne Calthrop, Jane Catherine Blackett
- Parent: Henry Peter John Layard
- Relatives: Sir Austen Henry Layard (brother)

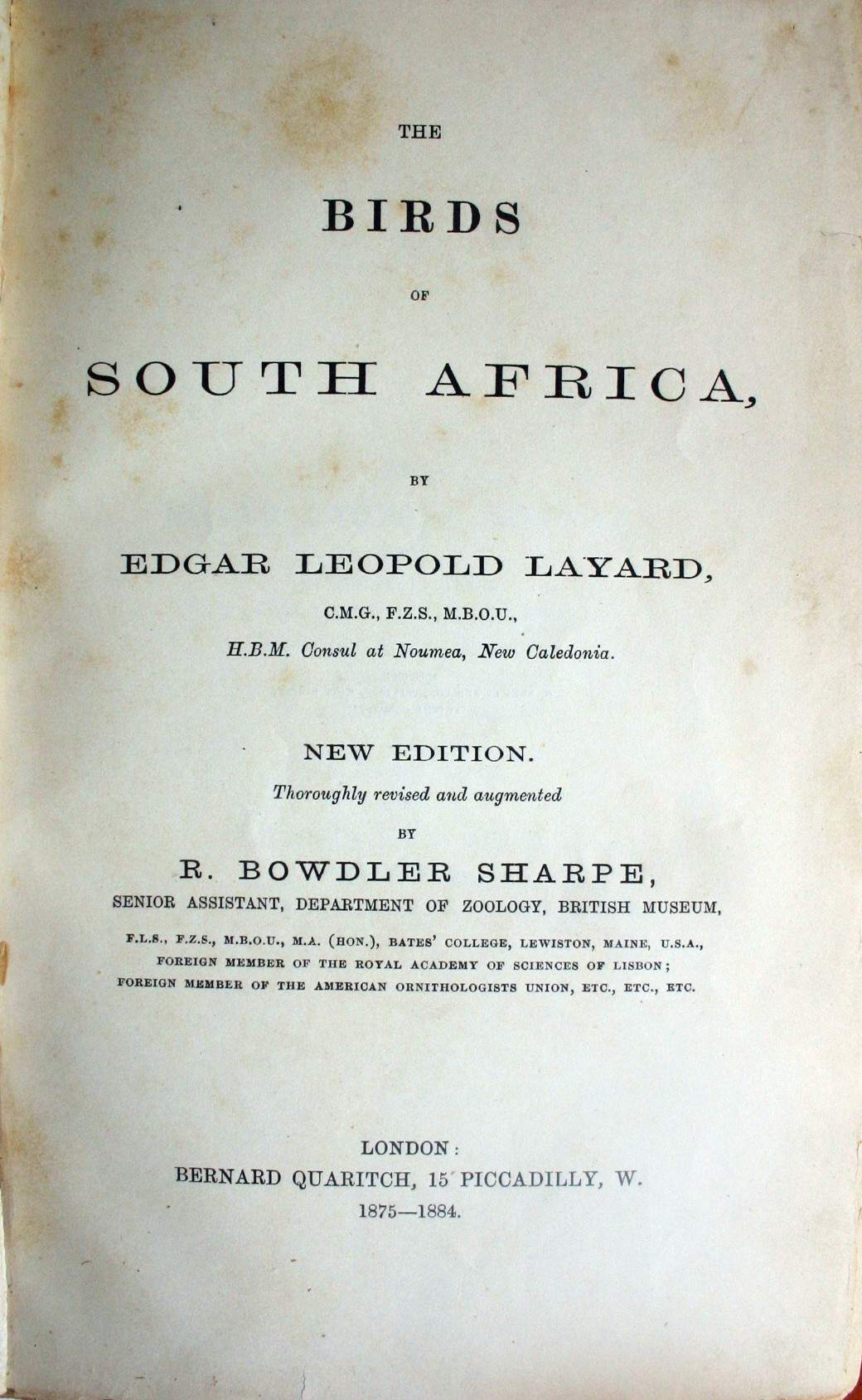
Title page of "Birds of South Africa" 2nd Ed.

Edgar Leopold Layard CMG FZS MBOU, (23 July 1824 – 1 January 1900) was a British diplomat and a naturalist mainly interested in ornithology and to a lesser extent the molluscs. He worked for a significant part of his life in Ceylon and later in South Africa, Fiji and New Caledonia. He studied the zoology of these places and established natural history museums in Sri Lanka and South Africa. Several species of animals are named after him.

== Early life and education ==
Born in the Berti Palace, Florence, Italy, to an English family of Huguenot descent, Layard was the youngest of seven sons (two of the earlier siblings died in infancy) of Henry Peter John Layard of the Ceylon Civil Service (the son of Charles Peter Layard, dean of Bristol, and grandson of Daniel Peter Layard the physician) with his wife Marianne, a daughter of Nathaniel Austen, banker, of Ramsgate. Through her, he was partly of Spanish descent. His uncle was Benjamin Austen, a London solicitor and close friend of Benjamin Disraeli in the 1820s and 1830s. His oldest brother was the archaeologist and politician Sir Austen Henry Layard. His cousin was Nina Frances Layard.

Layard attributed his early interest in natural history to the lack of siblings close to his age. Lacking playmates, he spent time making collections of shells and butterflies. His interests were not approved of by his father who approved only of literary tastes. When he was ten years old the family returned from Italy to England in Surrey. Layard's father died soon after and his mother moved with the children to her parental home in Ramsgate. Here Layard met a taxidermist and naturalist Mr.Thompson (Layard describes his as "of the "Elnis"" and mentions that he was sometime Mayor of Ramsgate) and learnt to skin and mount birds.

After going to school at Richmond he moved to Wheaton Aston and then to Cambridge.

== Career ==
He was to join the clergy but influenced by Leonard Jenyns and Col. Babbington, he felt attracted to zoology. He also met a woman with a taste for zoology who he would later marry. Layard chose to go to Canada but found it too cold and returned after 18 months. Now 21 he heard from a cousin of a vacancy in Ceylon for someone with mechanical skills to work on machinery in a coffee estate. He married Barbara Anne, daughter of Reverend John Calthrop on 18 October 1848 and travelled to Ceylon with his wife, now skilled in art, so as to assist him in his zoological studies.

Reaching Ceylon he fell ill and was attended to by Dr. Robert Templeton (1802–1892). Noticing the butterfly nets, the two became close friends who pursued the study of lepidoptera. Templeton also influenced Sir J.E. Tennent to find Layard an appointment. Layard was appointed a Custom House officer at Balliganbay. A correspondence with Edward Blyth changed his focus from botany to zoology and birds. Blyth sent him a list of all 182 of the known birds from Ceylon and sought specimens of poorly-known species. Layard valued his correspondence with Blyth greatly and was saddened by his death: This was the beginning of a correspondence continued monthly for years, & of the pleasure & profit it was to me, I can give no idea. I used carefully to bind up his letters as they came, & I often now, when I see them, think with a sad heart of the bright intelligence and vast ornithological knowledge that sank with him, in shadows, in the grave.

Layard spent ten years in Ceylon (Sri Lanka), where he studied the local fauna with Robert Templeton. He was forced to leave Ceylon by his and his wife's poor health. Most of their children died in infancy. Before leaving Ceylon, Layard's collection resulted in the number of species going from 182 to 318 species. On one occasion, he was able to use his natural history skills while settling a land dispute in Ceylon between two neighbouring farmers. He settled the disputed position of a filled up drain by digging them up and noticing the remains of a species of mollusc, which was later named after him as Tortulosa layardi (Pfeiffer 1851), along the true drain path. His collections were sent off to England and amounted to 9 tons.

In 1854, he went to the Cape Colony as a civil servant working in the service of the governor George Edward Grey (1812–1898). In addition, from 1855 Layard also took on a spare time position as curator of the South African Museum, and carried out extensive improvements at his own expense as well as building up the museum's collection and exhibits. In December 1855 Charles Darwin wrote to Layard with a description of his research investigating "the variation & origin of species", and requested assistance in obtaining specimens of domesticated animals and birds, particularly pigeons. Layard wrote back, and in June Darwin thanked him cordially for his "very valuable letter". In an expedition from October 1856 to March 1857, Layard visited Mauritius, Mombasa, Zanzibar, Madagascar, and ports on the southern coast of South Africa. In 1865 Layard found a whale which became known as the strap-toothed whale or the Layard's beaked whale, and was formally named Mesoplodon layardii. His work at the Mixed Commission ended when it was abolished in 1870, and Layard then had to return to Britain. He was succeeded at the museum by Roland Trimen. Subsequently, Layard had posts in Brazil, where he collected birds for Arthur Hay (1824–1878).

Edgar Layard administered the government of Fiji from 1874 to 1875 and was honorary British Consul at Nouméa, New Caledonia from 1876. Layard was appointed as an arbitrator to the British and Portuguese Commission at the Cape of Good Hope in 1862. Edgar Layard and his son, Edgar Leopold Calthrop Layard (referred to in the literature as either E.L.C. Layard or Leopold Layard to differentiate him from his father), were active collectors in this region, mainly of bird specimens. Between 1870 and 1881, they visited Fiji, Vanuatu, Samoa, Tonga, the Solomon Islands, New Britain and Norfolk Island. Aside from the South African material, the bird collections they made from their 'home base' of New Caledonia and the Loyalty Islands are the most scientifically important. The Layards sent material to William Sharp MacLeay in Sydney, but also to many other ornithologists. Their specimens have become very scattered. Many went to the British Museum in London. Others went to Henry Baker Tristram, and are now in the National Museums and Galleries on Merseyside in Liverpool, England. Further specimens are in the National Museums of Scotland.

In 1867, Layard published The Birds of South Africa, where he described 702 species. This work was later updated by Richard Bowdler Sharpe (1847–1909).

Layard wrote in his biographical notes:

I don't profess to be a scientific naturalist, I have Never been rich enough to purchase the books required for the study, and my life has been spent in countries where no museums existed, save those I myself established. In Ceylon I founded a museum in connection with the Ceylon Branch of the Royal Asiatic Society of Calcutta, what became of it I do not know, after my connection with the island was severed. At the Cape, the Museum also of my founding still flourishes. All I lay claim to is a certain knowledge of the life history of the Birds of the countries I have inhabited. I have followed them assiduously with their nature haunts, and watched them as closely as I could, and what I have seen I have recorded.

== Personal life ==
Layard's first wife, Barbara Anne Calthrop (died 1886), whom he married in 1845, is commemorated in the specific epithet of Layard's parakeet (Psittacula calthrapae) and he named the brown-breasted flycatcher (Muscicapa muttui) after his Tamil cook, Muttu who he considered as his "fidus Achates" or faithful follower. Only one son survived from the first marriage Edgar Leopold Calthrop Layard (born 21 Sep 1848). Layard married Jane Catherine Blackhall, daughter of General Robert Blackhall, in 1887.

Layard died in Budleigh Salterton, Devon, England on 1 January 1900.

== Commemoration ==
Several species are named after Layard including Layard's tit-babbler (Sylvia layardi) and the squirrel, Funambulus layardi. A species of lizard endemic to Sri Lanka, Nessia layardi (originally placed in the genus Acontias) was named after him by Edward Frederick Kelaart.

== Sources ==
- Bo Beolens and Michael Watkins (2003). Whose Bird? Common Bird Names and the People They Commemorate. Yale University Press (New Haven and London).
- Maurice Boubier (1925) Evolution of ornithology. Bookshop Felix Alcan (Paris), New scientific collection: II + 308 p.
- Barbara Mearns & Richard Mearns (1998). The Bird Collectors. Academic Press (London): xvii + 472 p.
