= Jack Hallam =

Jack Hallam may refer to:

- Jack Hallam (footballer) (1869–1949), footballer for Wales
- Jack Hallam (politician) (born 1942), Australian politician

== See also ==
- John Hallam (1941–2006), Northern Irish actor
- John Hallam (priest) (died 1811), Canon of Windsor
