= Sweet Place =

Christian hymn

- Genre: Hymn
- Text: Samuel Crossman
- Meter: 6.6.6.6.8.8
- Melody: "Christchurch" by Charles Steggall, "Darwall" by John Darwall and Aaron Williams

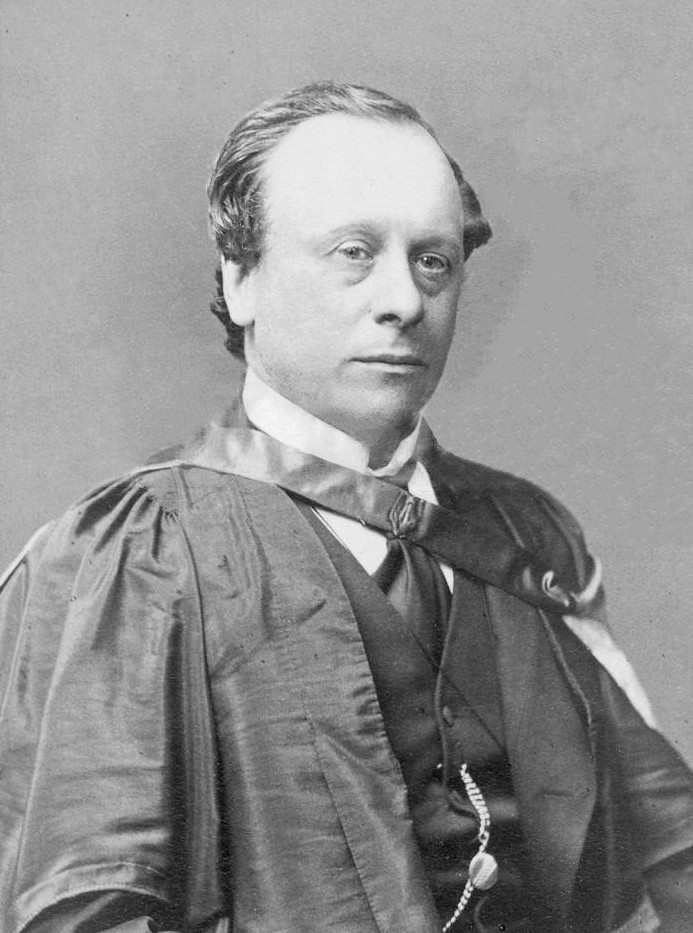
Charles Steggall

Sweet Place is a hymn by Samuel Crossman and music composed by John Darwall and Aaron Williams.

Sweet place; sweet place alone!

The court of God most high,

The heaven of heavens, the throne

Of spotless majesty!

Refrain

O happy place!

When shall I be, my God, with Thee,

To see Thy face?

The stranger homeward bends,

And sigheth for his rest:

Heaven is my home, my friends

Lodge there in Abraham’s breast.

Refrain

Earth’s but a sorry tent,

Pitched but a few frail days,

A short leased tenement;

Heaven’s still my song, my praise.

Refrain

No tears from any eyes

Drop in that holy choir:

But death itself there dies,

And sighs themselves expire.

Refrain

There should temptations cease,

My frailties there should end.

There should I rest in peace

In the arms of my best friend.

Refrain

Jerusalem on high

My song and city is,

My home whene’er I die,

The center of my bliss.

Refrain

Thy walls, sweet city! thine

With pearls are garnished,

Thy gates with praises shine,

Thy streets with gold are spread.

Refrain

No sun by day shines there,

No moon by silent night.

O no! these needless are;

The Lamb’s the city’s light.

Refrain

There dwells my Lord, my King,

Judged here unfit to live;

There angels to Him sing,

And lowly homage give.

Refrain

The patriarchs of old

There from their travels cease:

The prophets there behold

Their longed for Prince of peace.

Refrain

The Lamb’s apostles there

I might with joy behold:

The harpers I might hear

Harping on harps of gold.

Refrain

The bleeding martyrs, they

Within those courts are found;

All clothed in pure array,

Their scars with glory crowned.

Refrain

Ah me! ah me! that I

In Kedar’s tents here stay;

No place like this on high;

Thither, Lord! guide my way.

Refrain
