= Richard Bertie, 14th Earl of Lindsey =

English peer (born 1931)

The Right Honourable The Earl of Lindsey

Personal details
- Born: Richard Henry Rupert Bertie; 28 June 1931 (age 95)
- Spouse: Norah Elizabeth Farquhar-Oliver (after 1957)
- Relations: Montagu Bertie, 7th Earl of Abingdon (grandfather)
- Children: 3
- Parent(s): Hon. Arthur Michael Bertie; Aline Rose Arbuthnot-Leslie
- Education: Ampleforth College

Richard Henry Rupert Bertie, 14th Earl of Lindsey and 9th Earl of Abingdon (born 28 June 1931) is an English peer.

He was a member of the House of Lords from 1963 to 1999, where he belonged to the Conservative group.

== Early life ==
Lindsey is the son of Maj. Hon. Arthur Michael Cosmo Bertie (1886–1957) and, his first wife, Aline Rose (née Arbuthnot-Leslie) Ramsay.

Arthur Bertie was the second son of Montagu Bertie, 7th Earl of Abingdon. Richard Bertie inherited the earldoms in 1963 from a distant cousin Montague Bertie, 12th Earl of Lindsey.

He was educated at Ampleforth College.

== Career ==
Bertie did his national service with the Royal Norfolk Regiment, becoming a second lieutenant on 6 February 1952 with seniority from 3 February 1951. On 25 July 1952, he was given the acting rank of lieutenant, and the promotion was made substantive on 28 June 1954 with seniority from the date of his acting rank. Bertie was transferred to the Regular Army Reserve from the Army Emergency Reserve on 24 September 1957.

Between 1958 and 1996, he was a Lloyd's broker. In 1963, he succeeded his half-cousin as Earl of Lindsey and Abingdon and hereditary High Steward of Abingdon and joined the House of Lords.

== Personal life ==
In 1957, Bertie married Norah Elizabeth Farquhar-Oliver, a descendant of the Farquhar baronets and great-granddaughter of John Hely-Hutchinson, 5th Earl of Donoughmore. Together, they were the parents of two sons and a daughter:

- Henry Mark Willoughby Bertie, Lord Norreys (b. 1958), who married Lucinda Sol Morsoom in 1989.
- Lady Annabel Frances Rose Bertie (b. 1969)
- Hon. Alexander Michael Richard Willoughby Bertie (b. 1970), who married Catherine Davina Cameron, a daughter of Gordon Cameron, in 1998.

He lives at Gilmilnscroft House, near Mauchline, a seat of his wife's family, the Farquhars.

Peerage of England
Preceded by Montagu Towneley-Bertie	Earl of Lindsey; Earl of Abingdon; 1963–present	Incumbent heir apparent: Henry Bertie, Lord Norreys
