= Albemarle Bertie, 9th Earl of Lindsey =

British Army officer and politician (1744–1818)

General The Right Honourable The Earl of Lindsey
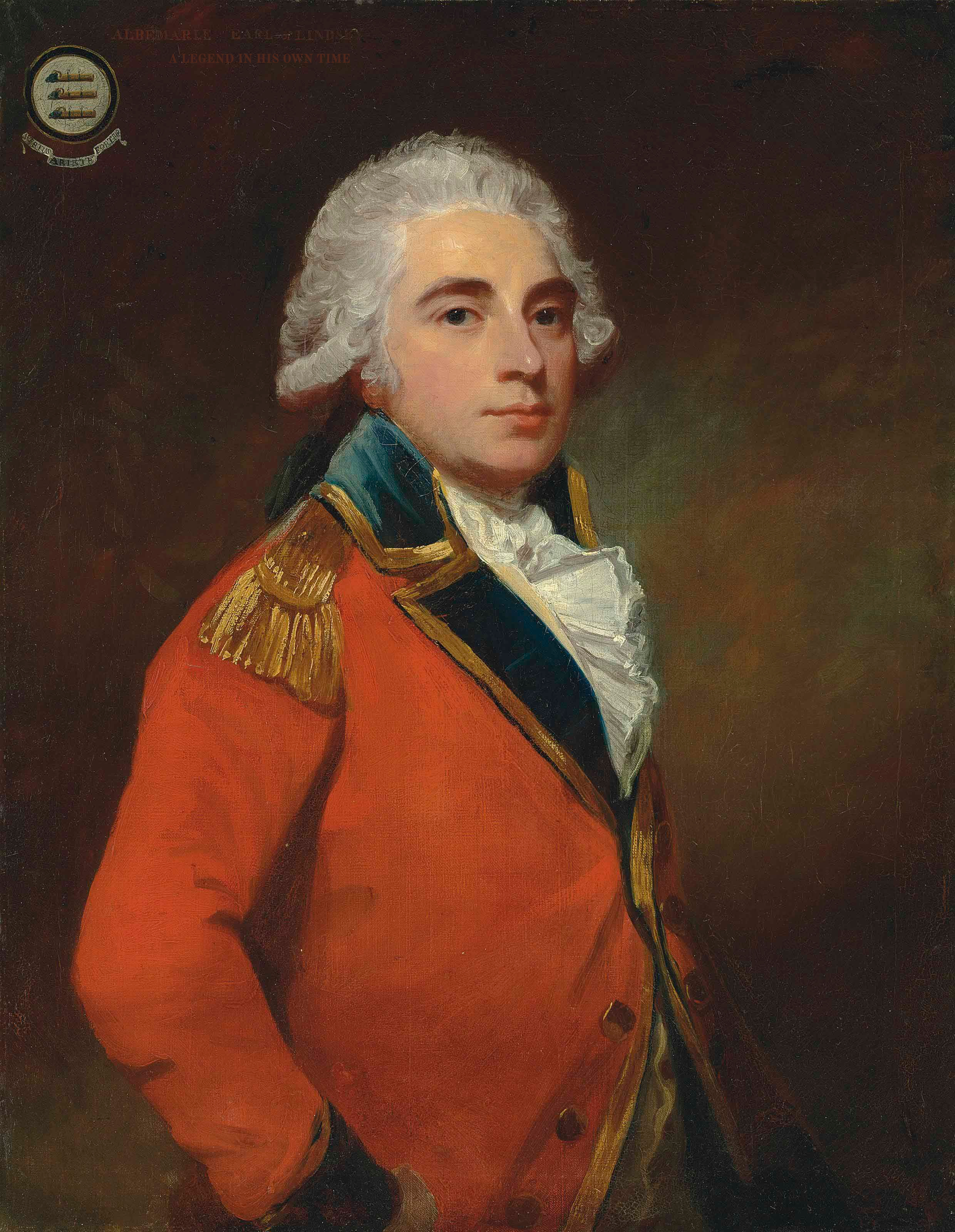

Member of Parliament for Stamford
- In office 1801–1809 Serving with John Leland, Evan Foulkes
- Preceded by: The Earl of Carysfort; John Leland
- Succeeded by: Evan Foulkes; Charles Chaplin

Personal details
- Born: Albemarle Bertie; 17 September 1744
- Died: 18 September 1818 (aged 74)
- Spouses: Eliza Maria Clay (m. 1794; died 1806) Charlotte Susannah Elizabeth Layard (m. 1809)
- Children: Lady Charlotte Guest; George Bertie, 10th Earl of Lindsey; Montague Bertie, 11th Earl of Lindsey
- Parent(s): Peregrine Bertie; Elizabeth Payne
- Relatives: Charles Bertie (grandfather); Montague Bertie, 12th Earl of Lindsey (grandson); Ivor Bertie Guest, 1st Baron Wimborne (grandson); Montague Guest (grandson); Arthur Guest (grandson)

Military service
- Allegiance: Great Britain
- Branch/service: British Army
- Rank: General
- Battles/wars: Napoleonic Wars

General Albemarle Bertie, 9th Earl of Lindsey (17 September 1744 – 18 September 1818) was a British Army officer and politician.

== Early life ==
Bertie was born on 17 September 1744. He was the son of Peregrine Bertie, a barrister of Lincoln's Inn (1709–1779) and the former Elizabeth Payne. He had two sisters, Louisa Bertie (wife of Fletcher Richardson of Cartmel) and Henrietta Bertie (wife of George Edmonds of Peterborough).

His paternal grandparents were the former Mary Narbonne (daughter and heiress of John Narbonne of Great Stukeley) and Charles Bertie, MP for Stamford (a son of the Hon. Charles Bertie, also an MP for Stamford, Envoy to Denmark and Secretary to the Treasury who was the fifth son of Montagu Bertie, 2nd Earl of Lindsey). His maternal grandfather was Edward Payne of Tottenham Wick.

== Military career ==
In 1762, he was commissioned an ensign in the 1st Foot Guards. He became lieutenant and captain in that regiment in 1769, captain and lieutenant colonel in 1776, and colonel in 1781. He became 3rd Major of the regiment 12 March 1789 and 2nd Major on 8 August 1792.

In 1793, he was promoted major-general, and was appointed colonel of the newly formed 81st Regiment of Foot on 19 September with instructions to recruit volunteers for it. In 1794, he obtained a colonelcy of an existing regiment, the 9th (East Norfolk) Regiment of Foot, instead. Bertie was promoted lieutenant-general in 1798 and general in 1803. In 1804, the Duke of York recommended him for the colonelcy of the 77th Regiment of Foot, then part of the Indian establishment, noting that "the difference of emolument is of great consequence" to Bertie. In 1808, he became commander of the 89th Regiment of Foot after John Whitelocke was cashiered and dismissed from the service.

Bertie retired from active service in 1809 upon inheriting the title of Earl of Lindsey from his third cousin on 8 February 1809. The earldom had been held by Robert Bertie, 1st Marquess of Lindsey from 1706 until 1715 when he was he was created the 1st Duke of Ancaster and Kesteven. The Dukes of Ancaster and Kesteven held the earldom until the dukedom became extinct on the death of Brownlow Bertie, 5th Duke of Ancaster and Kesteven in 1809, and the earldom passed to Bertie.

=== Political career ===
In 1801, he was nominated as Member of Parliament for Stamford, where the Bertie family had once held an electoral interest, by the Marquess of Exeter, then pre-eminent in the borough. He held the seat until succeeding to his peerage in 1809, but demonstrated little activity in Parliament. Lindsey inherited the Irish title of Viscount Cullen by special remainder in 1810, but never claimed it nor was acknowledged in the title. In 1814, he was appointed Governor of Blackness Castle, and in March 1818, of Charlemont Fort.

== Personal life ==
On 7 May 1794, Bertie was married to Eliza Maria (née Clay) Scrope, the widow of Thomas Scrope of Coleby and a daughter of William Clay of Burridge Hill, Nottinghamshire. They had no children before her death in July 1806.

On 18 November 1809 (when he was the Earl of Lindsey), he married Charlotte Susannah Elizabeth Layard (1780–1858), the daughter of the Very Reverend Charles Layard, Dean of Bristol. Together, Charlotte and Bertie were the parents of three children:

- Lady Charlotte Bertie (1812–1895), a prominent linguist who married John Josiah Guest, 1st Baronet in 1833. After his death in 1852, she married Charles Schreiber, MP for Cheltenham and Poole.
- George Augustus Frederick Albemarle Bertie, 10th Earl of Lindsey (1814–1877), who died unmarried.
- Montagu Peregrine Bertie, 11th Earl of Lindsey (1815–1899), who married Felicia Elizabeth Welby, the second daughter of Rev. John Earle Welby, Rector of Hareston (and son of Sir William Earle Welby, 1st Baronet) and Felicia Eliza Hole (a daughter of Rev. George Hole, Bishop of Norwich), in 1854.

Lord Lindsey died on 18 September 1818. After his death, his two sons, in turn, succeeded to his titles. After his death, Lady Lindsey married the Rev. William Peter Pegus and was the mother of Maria Antoinetta Pegus (who married Charles Gordon, 10th Marquess of Huntly) before her death on 28 November 1858.

=== Descendants ===
Through his daughter, Lady Charlotte, he was a grandfather of Charlotte Maria Guest (wife of Richard Du Cane); Ivor Bertie Guest, 1st Baron Wimborne (who married Lady Cornelia Henrietta Maria Spencer-Churchill, a daughter of John Spencer-Churchill, 7th Duke of Marlborough); Katharine Gwladys Guest (wife of the Rev. Frederick Cecil Alderson); Thomas Merthyr Guest (who married Lady Theodora Grosvenor, a daughter of Richard Grosvenor, 2nd Marquess of Westminster);Montague John Guest (who never married); Augustus Frederick Guest (who died unmarried aged 21); Arthur Edward Guest (who married Adeline Mary Chapman); Mary Enid Evelyn Guest (wife of her cousin, Sir Austen Henry Layard); Constance Rhiannon Guest (wife of Hon. Charles Eliot, youngest son of Edward Eliot, 3rd Earl of St Germans); and Blanche Vere Guest (wife of Edward Ponsonby, 8th Earl of Bessborough).

Through his youngest son, he was a grandfather of Montague Bertie, 12th Earl of Lindsey (1861–1938), who married Millicent Emma Cox (the eldest daughter of Dr. James Charles Cox), and served as aide-de-camp to the Governor of New South Wales from 1885 to 1888.

Parliament of the United Kingdom
Preceded by The Earl of Carysfort; John Leland	Member of Parliament for Stamford; 1801–1809; With: John Leland 1801–1808; Evan Foulkes 1808–1809	Succeeded by Evan Foulkes; Charles Chaplin
Military offices
New title	Colonel of the 81st Regiment of Foot; 1793–1794	Succeeded by Winter Blathwayte
Preceded by Alexander Leslie	Colonel of the 9th (East Norfolk) Regiment of Foot; 1794–1804	Succeeded by Peter Hunter
Preceded by James Marsh	Colonel of the 77th (Hindoostan) Regiment of Foot later the 77th (the East Middlesex) Regiment of Foot; 1804–1808	Succeeded by The Earl of Cavan
Preceded by John Whitelocke	Colonel of the 89th Regiment of Foot; 1808–1818	Succeeded by Sir George Beckwith
Preceded by The Lord Hill	Governor of Blackness Castle; 1814–1818	Succeeded by Sir Hew Dalrymple
Preceded by Hon. Chapple Norton	Governor of Charlemont Fort; 1818	Succeeded by Sir John Doyle
Peerage of England
Preceded by Brownlow Bertie	Earl of Lindsey; 1809–1818	Succeeded by George Bertie
