= Charles Layard (priest) =

Dean of Bristol

The Very Reverend Charles Layard F.R.S., D.D.
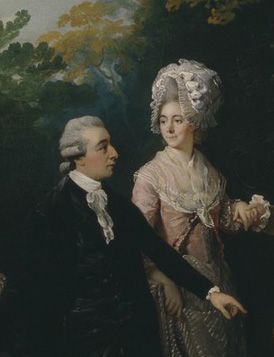
- Layard and his fiancée Elizabeth Ward, by Francis Wheatley, c. 1778

Dean of Bristol
- In office 1800–1803
- Preceded by: John Hallam
- Succeeded by: Bowyer Sparke

Personal details
- Born: Charles Peter Layard; 19 February 1750 London, England
- Died: 11 April 1803 (aged 53)
- Spouses: Elizabeth Ward (m. 1777; died 1796) Elizabeth Carver (m. 1798)
- Relations: Lady Charlotte Guest (granddaughter); George Bertie, 10th Earl of Lindsey (grandson); Montague Bertie, 11th Earl of Lindsey (grandson); Austen Henry Layard (grandson); Charles Peter Layard (grandson)
- Parent(s): Daniel Peter Layard; Susanne Henriette de Boisragon
- Education: St John's College, Cambridge

Charles Peter Layard, F.R.S., D.D. (19 February 1750 – 11 April 1803) was Dean of Bristol from 1800 until his death.

== Early life ==
Layard was born on 19 February 1750 in London. He was the son of the former Susanne Henriette de Boisragon and Dr. Daniel Peter Layard, the physician to Princess Augusta of Saxe-Gotha (the wife of Frederick, Prince of Wales and mother of King George III). Among his siblings were Lt.-Gen. John Thomas Layard (who married Frances Richardson), Lt.-Gen. Anthony Lewis Layard, Susanna Henrietta Layard (wife of Peter Pegus) and Charlotte Sophia Layard (wife of Henry Blatchford Scudamore).

His paternal grandparents were Major Peter Layard and Marie Anne Crozé. His maternal grandparents were Lt.-Col. Louis Chevalleau de Boisragon and Marie Henriette de Rambouillet.

== Career ==
Layard was educated at the Huntingdon School before attending St John's College, Cambridge with a Bachelor of Arts in 1770 and a Master of Arts in 1773 and a Doctor of Divinity in 1787.

He was ordained deacon on 21 December 1771; and priest on 27 February 1774. He was the Vicar at Kewstock between 1777 and 1799 and was appointed Fellow of the Royal Society in 1778. He held the office of Prebendary of Worcester Cathedral in 1793, Rector at Uffington between 1798 and 1803, and the office of Prebendary of Bangor Cathedral between 1799 and 1803.

He was the Minister at the Oxenden Chapel, a daughter church of St Martin-in-the-Fields before holding incumbencies in Wootton Bassett, Uffington and Kewstoke.

== Personal life ==
On 1 December 1777, Layard was married to Elizabeth Ward (d. 1796), a daughter of Joseph Ward and Ruth (née Carver) Ward of Greenwich, Kent. Together, they were the parents of:

- Brownlow Villiers Layard (1779–1861), the eldest son, an army officer who served as aide-de-camp and Chaplain to The Duke of Kent.
- Charlotte Susanna Elizabeth (1780–1858), married, as his second wife, Albemarle Bertie, 9th Earl of Lindsey. After his death in September 1818, she married, the Rev. William Peter Pegus in April 1821.
- Marianne Layard (1781–1840), who died unmarried.
- Henrietta Margaret Layard (1782–1855), who died unmarried.
- Henry Peter John Layard (1783–1834), of the Ceylon civil service who married Marianne Austen, a daughter of Nathaniel Austen, in 1814.
- Sophia Catherine Layard (1784–1785), who died unmarried.
- Charles Edward Layard (1786–1852), who married Barbara Bridgetina Mooyaart, a daughter of Gualterus Mooyaart, in 1804.
- Caroline Bethia Layard (1787–1827), who married Lewis Gibson, a son of William Gibson, in 1806.
- Louisa Frances Layard (1789–1851), who married Lt.-Col. Clement Martin Edwards in 1807.
- Mary Sarah Sophia Layard (1791–1868), who died unmarried.
- Elizabeth Frances Layard (1793–1857), who died unmarried.
- Jane Isabella Layard (1795–1796), who died unmarried.

After the death of his first wife in 1796, he married, secondly, to Elizabeth Carver on 24 October 1798.

Layard died on 11 April 1803.

=== Descendants ===
Through his daughter Charlotte's first marriage, he was posthumously a grandfather of three: Lady Charlotte Guest, George Bertie, 10th Earl of Lindsey, and Montague Bertie, 11th Earl of Lindsey. From her second marriage, he was, again posthumously, a grandfather of Maria Antoinetta Pegus (c. 1821–1893), who married Charles Gordon, 10th Marquess of Huntly (the widower of Lady Elizabeth Henrietta Conyngham, the eldest daughter of Henry Conyngham, 1st Marquess Conyngham), in 1844.

Through his son Charles, he was a grandfather of Sir Charles Peter Layard (1806–1893), the first Mayor of Colombo and the Government Agent for the Western Provinces of Ceylon. Sir Charles was the father of Charles Peter Layard (1849–1916), the 18th Chief Justice of Ceylon, and the grandfather of Sir Herbert Layard Dowbiggin (1880–1966), the British colonial Inspector General of Police of Ceylon.

Through his son Henry, he was a grandfather of Austen Henry Layard, the Under-Secretary of State for Foreign Affairs.

Church of England titles
Preceded by John Hallam	Dean of Bristol; 1800–1803	Succeeded by Bowyer Sparke
