= Thomas Chamberlayne (priest) =

Thomas Chamberlayne, D.D was Dean of Bristol from 1739 to 1757.

Church of England titles
Preceded by Samuel Creswicke	Dean of Bristol; 1739–1757	Succeeded by William Warburton
