= Cutts Barton =

English cleric

Cutts Barton (1706–1780) D.D. was an English cleric, Dean of Bristol from 1763 to 1780.

== Life ==
He was the son of Geoffrey Barton, vicar of Rushton, Northamptonshire. He attended Oundle School, and was admitted to Peterhouse, Cambridge in 1724, aged 17. He graduated there B.A. in 1728, and was ordained deacon that year, and M.A. 1732; he was incorporated at Oxford in 1733.

Barton became Rector of St Andrew Holborn in 1734. He was a pluralist, in 1745 taking on also the parish of Little Laver, Essex. He was appointed Clerk of the Closet in the household of Frederick, Prince of Wales, a position he held for life; after the Prince's death in 1751, he was chaplain to Princess Augusta of Saxe-Gotha, his widow. He was President of Sion College in 1754. In 1754 he preached a sermon for the Royal College of Physicians, London, and in 1758 one for the London Smallpox Hospital.

Thomas Newton was appointed Bishop of Bristol in 1761: he was also an associate of Frederick, Prince of Wales, and a chaplain to Princess Augusta from 1751. Through the Princess he had the support of Lord Bute for the post. Francis Ayscough (died 1763), another cleric from the household of Frederick, Prince of Wales, was made Dean of Bristol the same year. Newton found Barton, appointed Dean in 1763 after Ayscough's death, to be an absentee: he wrote that he had "several times been [in Bristol Cathedral] for months together, without seeing the face of Dean, or Prebendary, or any thing better than a Minor Canon." The Dean would normally have been required to reside for three months a year. Barton as Dean gave the pieces of Bristol High Cross, which had come to the cathedral, to Henry Hoare in 1764. They were rebuilt at Stourhead.

Cutts Barton died on 10 September 1780 at Langley Broom, then in Buckinghamshire, now part of Langley, Berkshire.

== Associations ==
Robert Barton (1630–1693), grandfather of Cutts Barton, was from Brigstock in north-east Northamptonshire. Brigstock Park in Rockingham Forest belonged to the Duke of Montagu, later passing to the Duke of Cleveland. The patronage of St Andrew Holborn, the living of Cutts Barton, was noted in 1754 as being with the "Duke of Montagu's heirs":

Geoffrey Barton, Cutts Barton's father, was a half-brother of Catherine Barton. Jonathan Swift knew both Catherine and Geoffrey: he reported in 1713 to John Montagu, 2nd Duke of Montagu on Geoffrey's electoral support for Edward Montagu, Viscount Hinchingbrooke at the Huntingdonshire election. The Bishop of Bangor wrote in 1722 to the Duke about the "approaching vacancy at St. Andrew's", in favour of "Mr. Barton". The incumbent at St Andrew Holborn was then Henry Sacheverell, who died in 1724. His replacement at St Andrew was Geoffrey Barton the younger, elder brother to Cutts, who was also a chaplain to Robert Walpole: he died in 1734.

The Rev. Michael Broughton, Rector of Barnwell St Andrew, wrote in 1747 to Charles Lennox, 2nd Duke of Richmond about a house party at Boughton House, the Montagu seat. Barton had travelled there with the Duke of Montagu in his post chaise, which had broken down. Having ridden the post horses for a few miles, they borrowed a two-wheel chaise. The party lasted around four weeks, and communicated with nearby Drayton House and Lady Elizabeth Germain. In 1748, with some possible allusion to the chaise incident, the Duke of Richmond invited Barton to Goodwood House with the Duke of Montagu, Sir Thomas Robinson and James Brudenell among others. Barton is described by the 8th Duke of Richmond as "one of a select and jovial coterie" that visited both ducal Boughton and Goodwood.

John Montagu, the 2nd Duke, died in 1749, and his heir and son-in-law, George Brudenell who changed surname to Montagu, became 1st Duke of Montagu of the second creation in 1766. Meanwhile, he used the title Earl of Cardigan.

Barton made himself useful to the Earl of Cardigan in the 1760s, buying for him land adjacent to the site of the future Buccleuch House on the River Thames. It included areas of Richmond Hill, London that are now part of the Terrace Gardens.

== In literature ==
The Bristolian Thomas Chatterton mentioned Cutts Barton in his poem "Kew Gardens"; and he made a pointed bequest in his will:

I leave also my religion to Dr. Cutts Barton, Dean of Bristol, hereby empowering the Sub-Sacrist to strike him on the head when he goes to sleep in church.

David Masson built on it, in his 1874 Chatterton: A Novel of the year 1770, and attributed to Chatterton the thought "You are a drowsy old rogue, Cutts, and have no more religion in you than a sausage."

== Family ==
With his wife Elizabeth, Geoffey Barton had sons including Robert and Matthew Barton RN, younger than Cutts; also Geoffrey, mentioned above, and Montagu (born 1717), who were clerics. Robert was British Consul in Cairo in the 1730s and 1740s, and another brother, George, was consul at Larnaca.

Cutts Barton married in 1741 Jo(h)anna Gardner, daughter of Col. Robert Gardner. Her mother, Catherine Greenwood, had previously been married to a Barton family member, Robert Barton the brother of Catherine Barton mentioned above; and Joanna herself had had a previous husband. They had five sons, Montagu who died young, and Charles who succeeded his father at St Andrew, Holborn; Robert who became a naval officer and his twin brother Matthew who died young; and John William of the Somerset Militia. There were also five daughters:

1. Joanna (1742–1754)
2. Elizabeth Catherine (born 1745), married John Crofts.
3. Frances (bapt. 1746 – 1825), married the Rev. Thomas Bowen.
4. Mary Ann (bapt. 1755 – 1821), married 1785 Thomas Watts, and then in 1801 Henry Brooksbank.
5. Susanna Elizabeth (1760–1764.

In the next generation Charles Cutts Barton, son of Charles Barton and his wife Harriet Carrett, married Emilia Anne Middleton, daughter of Hastings Nathaniel Middleton the elder: Charles Hastings Barton and Geoffrey Barton were their sons. Charles Cutts Barton's sister Mary Anne Barton married Hastings Nathaniel Middleton the younger, son of the former.

Church of England titles
Preceded by Francis Ayscough	Dean of Bristol; 1763–1780	Succeeded by John Hallam
