= Jerusalem On High =

- Genre: Hymn
- Text: Samuel Crossman
- Based on: Hebrews 12:22-23
- Melody: "Christchurch" by Charles Steggall

Jerusalem On High is a hymn written by minister Samuel Crossman and music composed by Charles Steggall.

Jerusalem on high, my song that city is,
My home whene’er I die, the center of my bliss;
O happy place! When shall I be,
My God, with Thee, to see Thy face?

There dwells my Lord, my King, judged here unfit to live;
There angels to Him sing and lowly homage give;
O happy place! When shall I be,
My God, with Thee, to see Thy face?

The patriarchs of old there from their travels cease;
The prophets there behold their longed for Prince of peace;
O happy place! When shall I be,
My God, with Thee, to see Thy face?

The Lamb’s Apostles there I might with joy behold,
The harpers I might hear harping on harps of gold;
O happy place! When shall I be,
My God, with Thee, to see Thy face?

The bleeding martyrs, they within those courts are found,
Clothèd in pure array, their scars with glory crowned;
O happy place! When shall I be,
My God, with Thee, to see Thy face?

Ah me! ah me! that I in Kedar’s tent here stay;
No place like that on high; Lord thither guide my way;
O happy place! When shall I be,
My God, with Thee, to see Thy face?
