= Frederick Augustus Wetherall =

British Army general

General Sir Frederick Augustus Wetherall GCH
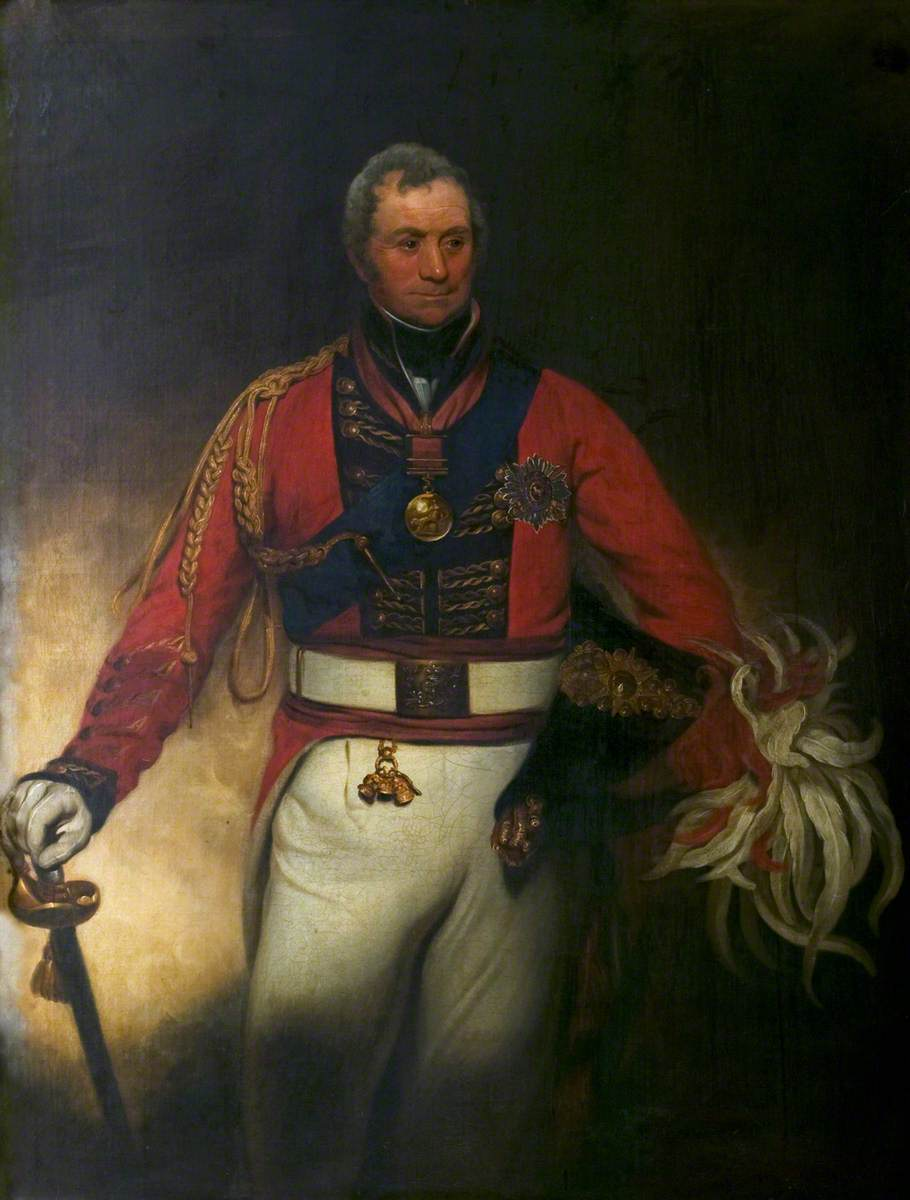
- Portrait by an unknown artist
- Born: 1754
- Died: 18 December 1842, aged 88; Castlebar Hill, Ealing
- Spouse(s): Elizabeth Mytton (m. 1781; died 1810) Elizabeth Ann Broad (m. 1817; died 1842)
- Children: Sir George Wetherall
- Military career
- Allegiance: United Kingdom
- Branch: British Army
- Service years: 1775–1842
- Rank: General
- Conflicts: American Revolutionary War; Siege of Boston; Battle of Long Island; Battle of White Plains; Battle of Princeton; Battle of Brandywine; Battle of Monmouth; Battle of Cape St. Vincent; French Revolutionary Wars; Battle of Martinique (WIA); Napoleonic Wars; Invasion of Java

General Sir Frederick Augustus Wetherall GCH (1754 – 18 December 1842) was a British Army officer, of Castle Bear House, Ealing.

He entered the Army in 1775 as an ensign in the 17th Regiment of Foot and fought in North America at the Siege of Boston and the subsequent evacuation to Halifax in 1776. He was afterwards involved at the battles of Long Island, White Plains, Brandywine and others, before joining HMS Alfred as captain of Marines and fighting at the Battle of St Vincent. In 1781 he was in Guernsey but in 1783 transferred to the 11th Regiment of Foot and spent 6 years in Gibraltar. In 1790 he was back in the Americas as an aide to the Duke of Kent in Quebec and the West Indies, where he took part in the capture of Martinique. In 1795 he was captured at sea by the French and spent 9 months as a prisoner-of-war.

Back in North America he raised a regiment in Nova Scotia of which he was made Colonel in 1803. In 1806 he was posted as a Brigadier to the Cape of Good Hope, from where he was next sent to India. He was again captured en route to Calcutta and spent two months in captivity before being exchanged. Safely in Calcutta as the second-in-command he took part in the conquest of Java in 1811, during which campaign he was assisted by his son George Wetherall. He returned to England in 1815 and in 1837 was promoted General and made Colonel of the 62nd Regiment of Foot. In 1840 he transferred as Colonel to the 17th (Leicestershire) Regiment.

In 1817 he had married, at St. Margaret's, Westminster, Mrs Broad, widow of Major Broad and second daughter of William Mair Esq. of Kensington, Middlesex.

Military offices
Preceded by Sir Hew Dalrymple	Governor of Blackness Castle; 1830–1837	Office abolished
Preceded by Samuel Hulse	Colonel of the 62nd (Wiltshire) Regiment of Foot; 1837–1840	Succeeded by Sir Archibald Campbell, Bt
Preceded by Josiah Champagné	Colonel of 17th (Leicestershire) Regiment; 1840–1842	Succeeded by Peregrine Maitland
