= Governor of Blackness Castle =

The Governor of Blackness Castle was a military officer who commanded the fortifications at Blackness Castle, a Scottish fortress on the Firth of Forth. Held by the Crown since 1453, Blackness saw military use until 1912 and a brief revival during the First World War.

== Governors of Blackness ==
- 1702–1707: David Erskine, 9th Earl of Buchan
- 1707–1710: Charles Murray, 1st Earl of Dunmore
- 1710–1714: David Erskine, 9th Earl of Buchan
- 1714–1723: Lord William Hay
- 1723–1741: Hon. William Kerr
- 1744?–1791: Charles Hope-Weir
- 1792–1806: Hon. Charles Hamilton
- 1806–1812: Sir James Henry Craig
- 1812–1814: Rowland Hill, 1st Baron Hill
- 1814–1818: Albemarle Bertie, 9th Earl of Lindsey
- 1818–1830: Sir Hew Dalrymple, 1st Baronet
- 1830–1837: Frederick Augustus Wetherall
- office abolished on Wetherall's resignation
