= Mary Whateley =

English poet and playwright 1738–1825

Mary Darwall (née Whateley; 1738 – 5 December 1825), who sometimes wrote as Harriett Airey, was an English poet and playwright. She belonged to the Shenstone Circle of writers gathered round William Shenstone in the English Midlands. She later explored subjects that included the nature of female friendship and the place of women writers.

== Life and work ==
Born in Beoley, Worcestershire into the prosperous farming family of William Whateley (1694–1763), Mary Whateley was the youngest of nine children, of whom seven survived infancy. She had little formal education, but by 1759 she was having poems published in The Gentleman's Magazine as Harriett Airey or Airy.

In 1760 Whateley moved to Walsall in Staffordshire to work as a housekeeper to her brother. There her poetry was noticed in 1761 by William Shenstone, who was impressed: "That she has generous and delicate sentiments, as well as ingenuity, may, I think, be fairly concluded from the whole tenor of her Poetry."

Her first volume of Original Poems on Several Occasions appeared from Robert Dodsley in 1764. It held 30 works, including odes and hymns and a satire, "The Power of Destiny", which considers how different her existence would have been had she been born male. It went through several editions in London, Dublin and Walsall. She stands up in a Dedication for the place of women in literature, saying she looks down "with a just contempt on the invidious reflections... of Prejudice" against that. She presents herself also as a foe to negativism: "Nought I condemn but that Excess which clouds/The mental Faculties, to soothe the Sense:/Let Reason, Truth, and Virtue, guide thy Steps,/And ev'ry Blessing Heav'n bestows be thine."

In 1766 Whateley married John Darwall, a widowed clergyman and father of five or six, by whom she had six further children. Despite family responsibilities and helping her husband to run a printing press, she continued to write, producing hymns for her husband's congregation, perhaps the best known of these being the tune Darwall, usually sung to "Rejoice, the Lord is King". This appears in 221 hymnals. She also wrote a play for a local theatre. At least five of her poems appeared in miscellanies between 1770 and 1785. Liberty: An Elegy, for example, appeared in that form in 1775 and again in 1783. Her poem "Female Friendship", which appeared in The Westminster Magazine in April 1776, puts this in a context of self-sacrificing heterosexual friendship.

On the death of her husband in 1789, Mary Darwall moved to Deritend, Birmingham, and then in 1793 to Newtown in Montgomeryshire, from where she published in 1794 a second collection, Poems on Several Occasions. This included some work by others, probably two of her daughters, one of whom, Elizabeth, would publish The Storm, with Other Poems in 1810, to which Mary in turn is thought to have contributed four poems.

Mary Darwall died in Walsall on 5 December 1825.

== Publications ==
- Original Poems on Several Occasions (1764)
- Poems on Several Occasions (2 volumes, 1794). Online: Retrieved 10 January 2016.

== External sources ==
- "The Pleasure of Contemplation by Miss Whateley", from Original Poems..., online Retrieved 10 January 2016
- "On the Author's Husband Desiring her to Write Some Verses", reprinted in Deborah Kennedy: "Literary Women. Book Review", Eighteenth-Century Studies 35.2 (2002), pp. 320–323. This points out the time constraints on a busy housewife.
- "Written on Walking in the Woods of Gregynog in Montgomeryshire", from Poems on Several Occasions, online Retrieved 10 January 2016
- Scholarly assessment: Ann Messenger: Woman and Poet in the Eighteenth Century: The Life of Mary Whateley Darwall, 1738–1825 (New York: AMS Press, 1999)
