= Francis Leighton (British Army officer) =

British general (1696–1773)

General Francis Leighton (1696 – 9 June 1773) was a general of the British Army.

He was born the fourth son and ninth child of Sir Edward Leighton, 1st Baronet, of Wattlesborough in Shropshire. He entered the Army as a captain on 16 June 1716. In 1730 he transferred from major of Barrell's Regiment of Foot to major of Handasyd's Regiment of Foot, and on 6 July 1737 was promoted lieutenant-colonel of Blakeney's Regiment of Foot. During the Jacobite rising of 1745 Leighton was sent with a considerable force from Perth to hold the outpost of Castle Menzies. He was promoted colonel of the 32nd Regiment of Foot on 1 December 1747, major-general on 5 February 1757, lieutenant-general on 6 April 1759 and general on 25 May 1772.

Leighton died on 9 June 1773. By his wife, the former Miss Renea Pinfold, he had a son, who died young, and two daughters: Charlotte, who died unmarried in 1820, and Frances, who was married on 16 May 1783 to Sir Hew Whitefoord Dalrymple, 1st Baronet.
