= Montagu Towneley-Bertie, 13th Earl of Lindsey =

English peer (1887–1963)

The grave of Montagu Towneley-Bertie, 13th Earl of Lindsey and 8th Earl of Abingdon in Brookwood Cemetery

Montagu Henry Edmund Cecil Towneley-Bertie, 13th Earl of Lindsey and 8th Earl of Abingdon (2 November 1887 – 11 September 1963) styled Lord Norreys between 1919 and 1928 and known as The 8th Earl of Abingdon from 1928 onwards, was an English peer.

== Background ==
Towneley-Bertie was the son of Montagu Charles Francis Towneley-Bertie, Lord Norreys and the Honourable Rose Riversdale Glyn. His father died in 1919, during his grandfather's lifetime, and Towneley-Bertie was thereafter styled Lord Norreys until he succeeded his grandfather, Montagu Bertie, 7th Earl of Abingdon, as Earl of Abingdon on 10 March 1928.

== Career ==
He was a family trustee of the British Museum, and High Steward of Abingdon. Upon the death on 2 January 1938 of his kinsman, Montague Bertie, 12th Earl of Lindsey, a half-fifth cousin thrice removed, he succeeded as 13th Earl of Lindsey. On his death in 1963 he was succeeded in his titles by his half-cousin, Richard Bertie, 14th Earl of Lindsey.

He was on the governing body of Abingdon School from 1928 to 1949 and was the Chairman of the Governors from 1935 to 1937.

== Family ==
He married Elizabeth ("Bettine") Valetta Montagu-Stuart-Wortley, daughter of Major-General the Hon. Edward James Montagu-Stuart-Wortley and Violet Hunter Guthrie, on 11 August 1928. The marriage produced no children. When the Countess died in 1978, she left all her possessions- with a value of over £1.5 million- to her lifelong friend, Joyce, the wife of BBC television news editor Tahu Hole. They were later bequeathed to the Victoria and Albert Museum. The couple are buried in Brookwood Cemetery.

Peerage of England
Preceded by Montague Peregrine Albemarle Bertie	Earl of Lindsey; 1938–1963	Succeeded by Richard Henry Rupert Bertie
Preceded by Montagu Arthur Bertie	Earl of Abingdon; 1928–1963	Succeeded by Richard Henry Rupert Bertie
