= John Whiteheare =

John Whiteheare (sometimes Whythere) was the second Dean of Bristol.

Whiteheare was installed on 1 October, 1451.

Church of England titles
Preceded by William Snow	Dean of Bristol; 1551–1552	Succeeded by George Carew
