= Richard Towgood =

English royalist churchman

Richard Towgood (c. 1595–1683) was an English royalist churchman, Dean of Bristol from 1667.

== Life ==
He was born near Bruton, Somerset, about 1595. The family name is spelled also Toogood, Twogood, and Towgard. He entered Oriel College, Oxford, as a servitor in 1610 and matriculated 19 April 1611, at the age of sixteen. He graduated with a B.A. on 1 February 1615, an M.A. on 4 February 1618, and a B.D. on 7 November 1633. Having taken orders about 1615, he preached in the neighbourhood of Oxford, till he was appointed master of the grammar school in College Green, Bristol.

In 1619 he was instituted vicar of All Saints', Bristol, and preferred in 1626 to the vicarage of St. Nicholas, Bristol. He was made a chaplain to Charles I about 1633. On 20 February 1645 he was sequestered from his vicarage for opposing the parliamentary government. He was several times imprisoned under severe conditions, was ordered to be shot, and then reprieved. Gaining his liberty, he retired to Wotton-under-Edge, Gloucestershire. After some years, through the mediation of Archbishop James Ussher, he began to preach at Kingswood Chapel, near Wotton, and was soon after presented to the neighbouring rectory of Tortworth.

On the Restoration he returned to St. Nicholas, Bristol, invited by the parishioners. He was installed, 25 August 1660, in the sixth prebend in Bristol Cathedral, to which he had been nominated before the civil war; and was sworn chaplain to Charles II. In 1664 he was presented to the vicarage of Weare, Somerset. On 1 May 1667 he succeeded Henry Glemham as dean of Bristol, and in October 1671 he was offered the bishopric, vacant on the death of Gilbert Ironside, but declined it. He died on 21 April 1683, in his eighty-ninth year, and was buried in the north aisle of the choir of the cathedral. He published two sermons in 1643, another in 1676.

By his wife Elizabeth he had sons Richard and William; his grandson Richard (son of Richard) was prebendary of Bristol (30 July 1685) and vicar of Bitton (1685), Olveston (1697), and Winterbourne (1698), all in Gloucestershire.

== Sources ==
- This article incorporates text from a publication now in the public domain: "Towgood, Richard". Dictionary of National Biography. London: Smith, Elder & Co. 1885–1900.
