= William Snow (priest) =

William Snow (sometimes Snowe) was the inaugural Dean of Bristol.

The last Prior of Bradenstoke, Snow was granted a Crown pension on 24 April 1539 and was Dean from 1542 to 1551.

Church of England titles
Preceded by Inaugural incumbent	Dean of Bristol; 1542–1551	Succeeded by John Whiteheare
