= Henry Joliffe =

Henry Joliffe B.D. was Dean of Bristol from 1554 to 1559.

Joliffe educated at Clare College, Cambridge. He held livings at Hampton Bishop and Houghton, Huntingdonshire.

He died at Louvain on 28 January 1574.

Church of England titles
Preceded by George Carew (deprived)	Dean of Bristol; 1554–1559	Succeeded by George Carew (restored)
