= John Lamb (priest) =

English academic and priest (1789–1850)

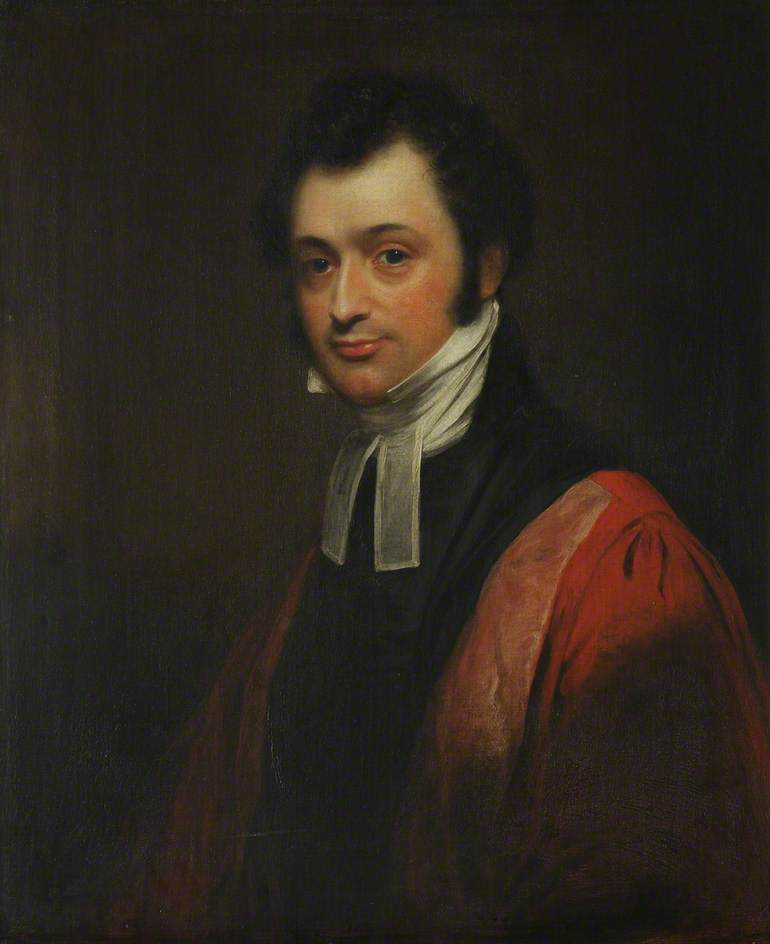
John Lamb by William Beechey

John Lamb, (28 February 1789 – 18 April 1850) was an academic and Anglican priest in the first half of the nineteenth century.

A mathematician, he was Master of Corpus Christi College, Cambridge from 1822 to 1837. He also became Dean of Bristol from 1837 until his death.

He was born in Ixworth and died in Cambridge.

== Works ==
- The Seven Words Spoken Against the Lord Jesus

Church of England titles
Preceded by Thomas Musgrave	Dean of Bristol; 1837–1850	Succeeded by Gilbert Elliot
