= Castlebar Hill =

Hill and road in Ealing, London

Coordinates: 51.5214°N 0.3121°W

Castle Bear House in 1795 which was subsequently owned by Lt. General Frederick Wetherall. His friend, Prince Edward, Duke of Kent, owned Castle Hill Lodge nearby. Ealing Abbey now stands upon this site.

Castlebar Hill is a hill in Ealing which is 167 feet (51 m) high. In the 18th century, it was the location of Castle Beare, a grand mansion or country seat, for the area at this time was but a hamlet, not yet having been built up as part of the London conurbation.

Castlebar Hill is also the name of one of the roads that runs up the hill (now classed as part of the B455).

An experimental hostel for deaf and blind children was founded at what is now 8 Castlebar Hill by Dr Edith Whetnall FRCS, a pioneering audiologist. The hostel was opened in 1953 by Iain Macleod MP and Spencer Tracy, as part of The Royal National Throat, Nose and Ear Hospital. It closed in 1993. In 2015, the Ealing Civil Society unveiled a plaque dedicated to the work of Dr Edith Whetnall on the building.

== Notable residents ==
- Archibald Constable, publisher.
- Lord Heathfield of Gibraltar
- Lt. General Frederick Wetherall, who conquered Java during the Napoleonic Wars.
- Prince Edward, Duke of Kent, father of Queen Victoria.
- Squire George Osbaldeston, outstanding sportsman and gambler.
