= Sir Hew Dalrymple, 1st Baronet, of High Mark =

British Army officer (1750–1830)

General Sir Hew Dalrymple Bt
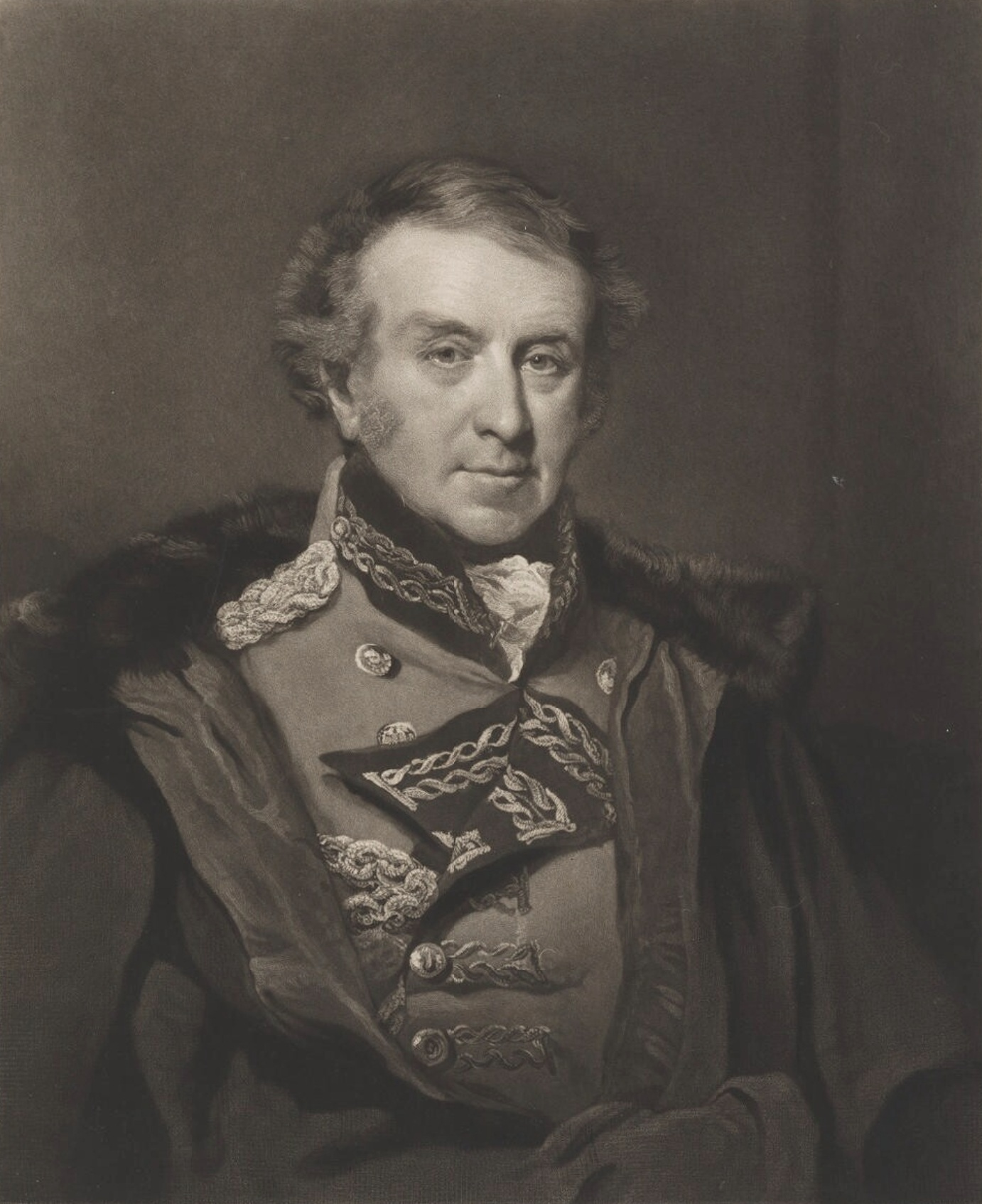
- Engraving by Charles Turner after a John Jackson portrait, 1831
- Born: 3 December 1750; Ayr, Scotland
- Died: 9 April 1830 (aged 79); London, England
- Burial place: Aldenham, Hertfordshire
- Military career
- Allegiance: Great Britain; United Kingdom
- Branch: British Army
- Service years: 1763–1830
- Rank: General
- Commands: Northern District
- Conflicts: Peninsular War

General Sir Hew Whitefoord Dalrymple, 1st Baronet (3 December 1750 – 9 April 1830) was a British Army officer who served as the acting governor of Gibraltar from 1806 to 1808.

== Early life ==
Dalrymple was the only son of Captain John Dalrymple, of the 6th Dragoons and his second wife, Mary, née Ross (c.1719–1793). Following his father's death in 1753, Dalrymple's mother married Sir James Adolphus Oughton.

== Military career ==
Dalrymple was commissioned as an ensign into the 31st Regiment of Foot in 1763, was promoted lieutenant in 1766 and captain in 1768. He took time out from the Army to study at the University of Edinburgh from 1767 to 1768. Dalrymple was knighted in 1779 thanks to the influence of his family.

Lieutenant-colonel of the 68th Foot in 1781, he was promoted to colonel when he transferred to the 1st Foot Guards. In 1793 he commanded a composite battalion of grenadiers in Gerard Lake's brigade under Prince Frederick, Duke of York in the Flanders Campaign, and saw action at Raismes 8 May, Famars 23 May, the Siege of Valenciennes 13 June – 28 July, and the Siege of Dunkirk 25 August – 10 September. He returned to Britain early in 1794 and was made major-general on 3 October.

In 1796, he was appointed Lieutenant Governor of Guernsey. He became colonel of the 81st Regiment of Foot (Loyal Lincoln Volunteers) in 1797, transferred to the 37th (North Hampshire) Regiment of Foot in 1798 and to the Green Howards in 1810.

On 1 January 1801 he was promoted lieutenant-general and from 1802 to 1806 was general officer commanding Northern District. In 1806, he was posted to Gibraltar to serve under Lt-General Henry Edward Fox. After Fox's departure he was made acting governor of Gibraltar, replacing Gordon Drummond, November 1806 – August 1808.

In 1808, he was appointed commander of the Portuguese Expedition, landing on 22 August after Jean-Andoche Junot's defeat at Vimiero to replace Sir Arthur Wellesley and Harry Burrard. He immediately halted Wellesley's pursuit of the beaten French to Lisbon. Lacking either confidence or intelligence, or both, on 31 August Dalrymple signed a truce with Junot allowing him to return to France in British ships with all his weapons, men and loot.

This infamous truce, known as the Convention of Cintra, was denounced both in London and in Portugal. Dalrymple sailed for home to face an enquiry 4 October, and never held a field command again.

Sir John Moore, Dalrymple's replacement in Portugal, said he "was never able to determine on any point whatever". He also stated that "Sir Hew, having never had the experience of command, seems quite at a loss how to work with the different heads of department; the troops suffer".

Made Colonel of the 57th (West Middlesex) Regiment in 1811, he was promoted General on 1 January 1812 through seniority. He was also made Governor of Blackness Castle in 1818.

== Miscellaneous ==
- He was nicknamed "Dowager" by the army.
- Dalrymple was played by John Woodvine, in the 1999 Hornblower episode, The Duchess and the Devil.
- Dalrymple features prominently as the governor of Gibraltar and commander in Portugal in books 20 and 21 of Dewey Lambdin's Alan Lewrie series of Naval fiction.

== Family ==
In 1783 he married Frances, daughter of General Francis Leighton, and together they had three daughters and two sons.

Military offices
Preceded by John Small	Lieutenant Governor of Guernsey; 1796–1802	Succeeded by Sir John Doyle
Preceded by The Duke of Gloucester and Edinburgh	GOC Northern District; 1802–1806	Succeeded by Sir David Dundas
Preceded by Henry Fox	Governor of Gibraltar (acting); 1806–1808	Succeeded by Sir John Cradock
Preceded by Gordon Forbes	Colonel of the 81st Regiment of Foot; 1797–1798	Succeeded by John Simcoe
Preceded by Sir John Dalling	Colonel of the 37th (North Hampshire) Regiment of Foot; 1798–1810	Succeeded by Sir Charles Lockhart-Ross
Preceded by Samuel Hulse	Colonel of the 19th (The 1st Yorkshire North Riding) Regiment of Foot; 1810–1811	Succeeded by Tomkyns Hilgrove Turner
Preceded by The Lord Hutchinson	Colonel of the 57th (West Middlesex) Regiment of Foot; 1811–1830	Succeeded by Sir William Inglis
Preceded by The Earl of Lindsey	Governor of Blackness Castle; 1818–1830	Succeeded by Frederick Augustus Wetherall
Baronetage of the United Kingdom
New creation	Baronet (of High Mark); 1815–1830	Succeeded by Adolphus John Dalrymple
