= Thomas Bickley =

English churchman and Marian exile

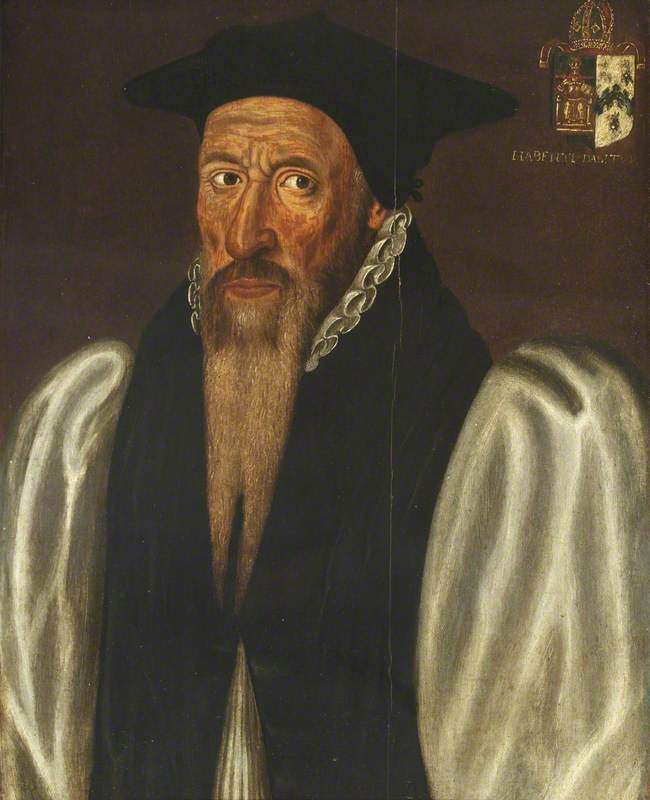
Thomas Bickley, Bishop of Chichester, showing arms of the See of Chichester impaling Bickley (Argent, a chevron embattled counter-embattled between three griffin's heads erased sable

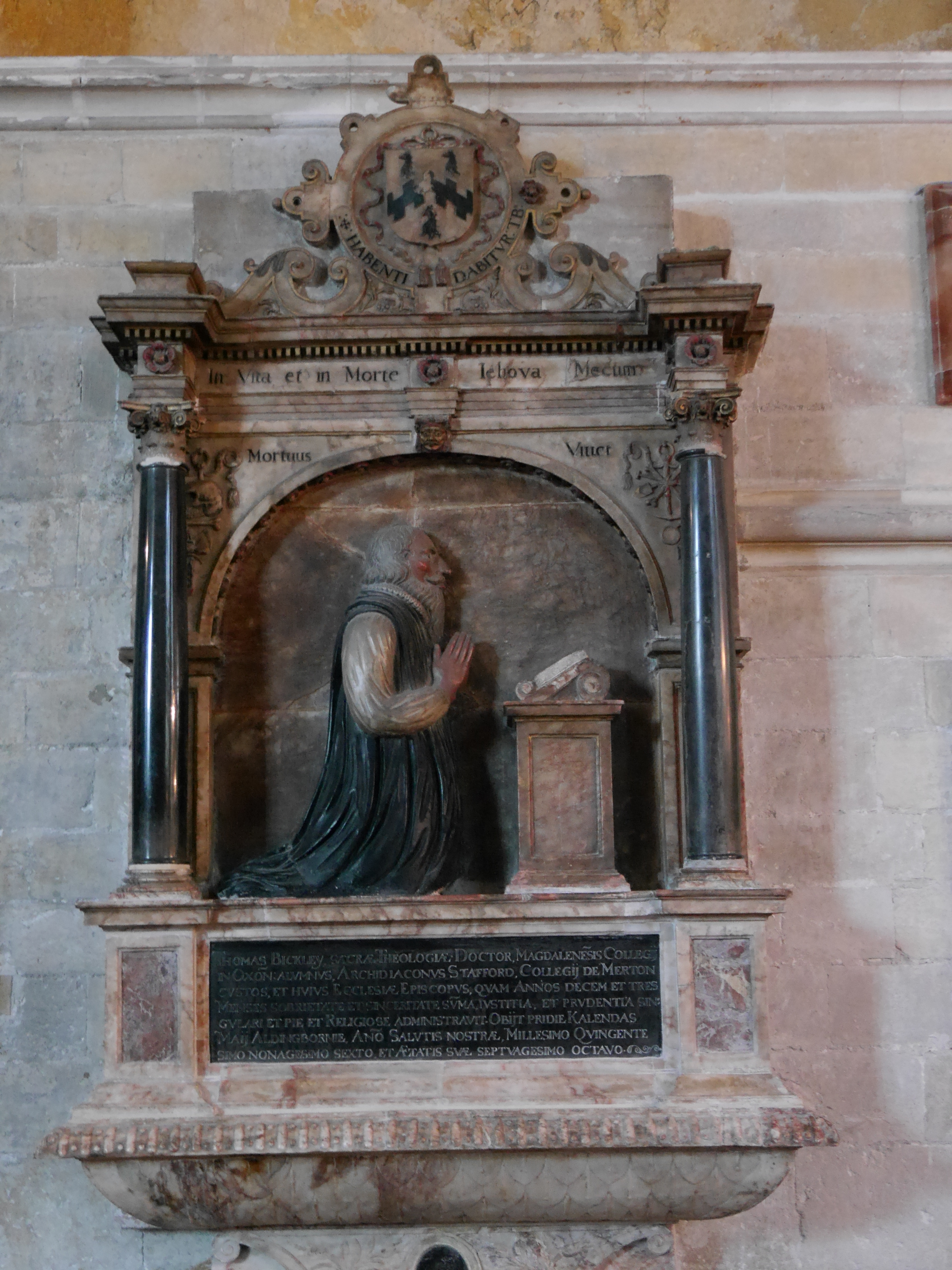
Mural monument to Thomas Bickley, Chichester Cathedral

Thomas Bickley (1518–1596) was an English churchman, a Marian exile who became Warden of Merton College, Oxford and Bishop of Chichester

== Life ==
He was born at Stow, Buckinghamshire, and began his education as a chorister in the free school of Magdalen College, Oxford. He afterwards became a demy, and in 1541 was elected a Fellow of the college. He acquired a reputation as a reformer and preacher of reformed doctrine, and soon after the accession of Edward VI was appointed one of the king's chaplains at Windsor.

During the reign of Mary I of England he went to France, where he spent most of his time in study at Paris and Orléans. Returning to England after the accession of Elizabeth I, he enjoyed rapid promotion, being made, within ten years, chaplain to Archbishop Matthew Parker, rector of Biddenden in Kent, of Sutton Waldron in Dorset, archdeacon of Stafford, chancellor in Lichfield Cathedral, and Warden of Merton College, Oxford.

He was made bishop of Chichester in 1585. Some of the returns to articles of inquiry made at his visitations have been preserved amongst the episcopal records. He died in 1596, and was buried in Chichester Cathedral on 26 May. A tablet to Bickley's memory is attached to the north wall of the lady chapel, surmounted by a small kneeling effigy of the bishop.

Academic offices
Preceded by John Man	Warden of Merton College, Oxford; 1569–1585	Succeeded by Henry Savile
Church of England titles
Preceded by Richard Curteys vacancy from 1582	Bishop of Chichester; 1586–1596	Succeeded by Anthony Watson
