= Gilbert Elliot (priest) =

Priest and Dean of Bristol

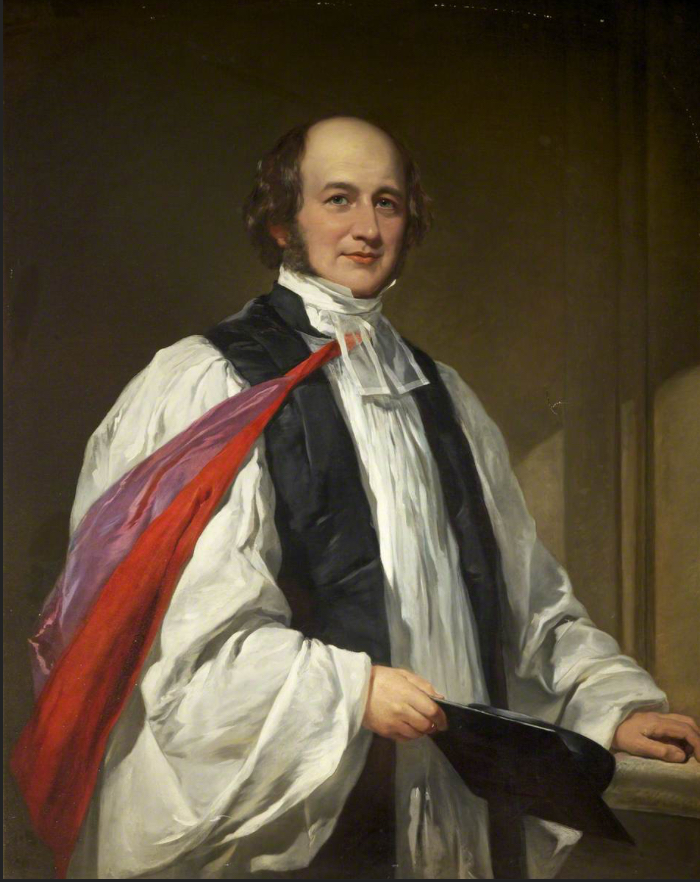
Gilbert Elliot, portrait by James Curnock

Gilbert Elliot (17 March 1800 – 11 August 1891) was Dean of Bristol from 1850 until his death.

The son of diplomat Hugh Elliot, he was born in Dresden and educated at Norwich School. After a time at Edinburgh University, he matriculated at St John's College, Cambridge in 1818, graduating B.A. 1823, M.A. 1828 (having migrated to Trinity Hall, Cambridge). He additionally received a Lambeth D.D. in 1850.

He was ordained in 1824 and held incumbencies in Newington Butts, Barming, Kirkby Thore and Marylebone. He was Chaplain to the Archbishop of Canterbury from 1848 to 1850. He died in Bristol.

Church of England titles
Preceded by John Lamb	Dean of Bristol; 1850–1891	Succeeded by Francis Pigou
