= Montagu Bertie, 7th Earl of Abingdon =

English peer

The Right Honourable The Earl of Abingdon DL JP
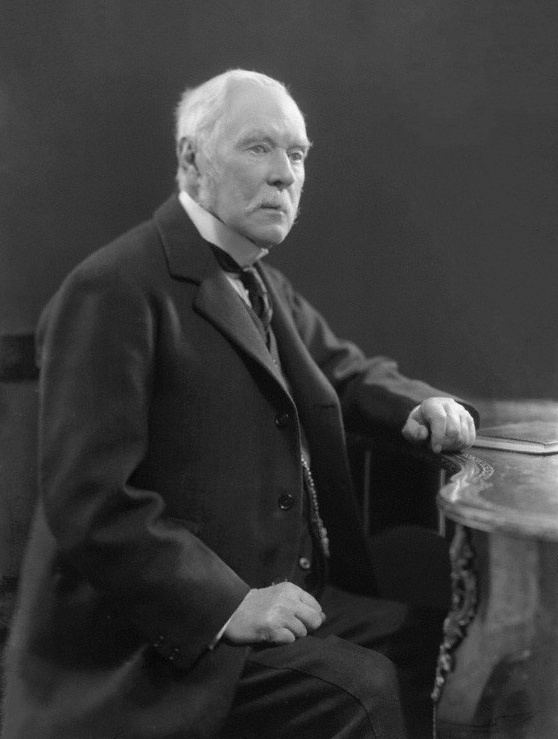
- Earl of Abingdon, 6 December 1921
- Born: Montagu Arthur Bertie; 13 May 1836; Hanover Square, Mayfair, England
- Died: 10 March 1928 (aged 91); Oaken Holt, Oxfordshire, England
- Education: Eton College
- Spouses: Caroline Theresa Towneley (m. 1858; died 1873) Gwendoline Mary Dormer (after 1883)
- Children: 8
- Parent(s): Montagu Bertie, 6th Earl of Abingdon; Elizabeth Lavinia Vernon-Harcourt
- Relatives: Francis Bertie, 1st Viscount Bertie of Thame (brother)

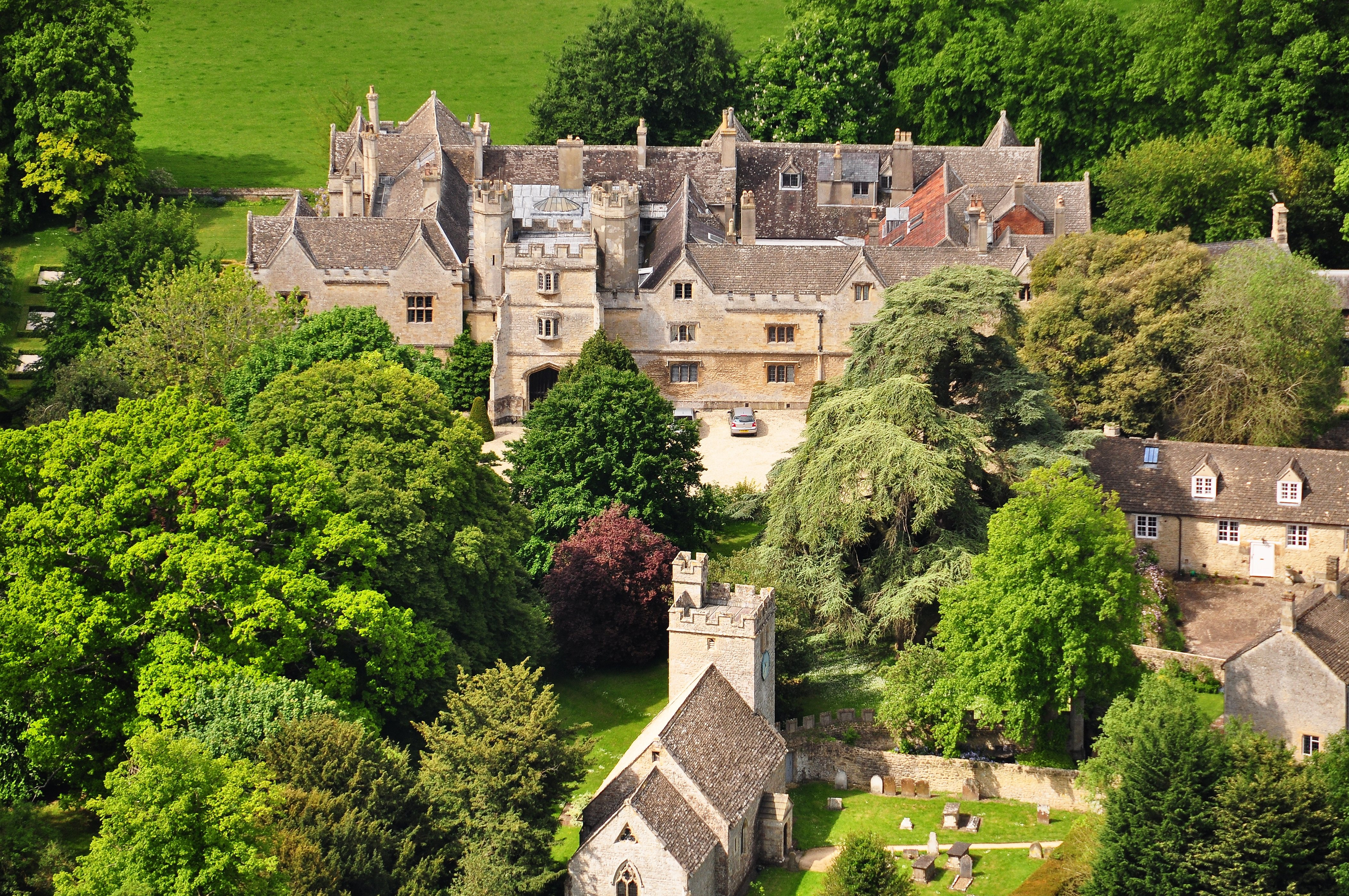
Wytham Abbey

Montagu Arthur Bertie, 7th Earl of Abingdon DL JP (13 May 1836 – 10 March 1928), styled Lord Norreys from 1854 to 1884, was an English peer.

== Early life ==
Montagu Arthur Bertie was born on 13 May 1836 at Hanover Square, Mayfair. He was the eldest of nine children born to Montagu Bertie, 6th Earl of Abingdon (1808–1884) and Elizabeth Lavinia (née Vernon-Harcourt) Bertie, Countess of Abingdon (1816–1858). His younger brother was Francis Bertie, 1st Viscount Bertie of Thame, who served as the British Ambassador to France.

His maternal grandparents were George Granville Vernon-Harcourt, a British Member of Parliament, and Lady Elizabeth Bingham, the eldest daughter of Richard Bingham, 2nd Earl of Lucan. His paternal grandfather was Montagu Bertie, 5th Earl of Abingdon, and his first wife Emily (née Gage) Bertie, who was the fifth daughter of General Hon. Thomas Gage, the Commander-in-Chief, North America. Through his great-grandmother, Margaret Kemble Gage, he had Dutch and Huguenot ancestral roots from the Schuyler, Van Cortlandt, and the Delancey families of British North America.

Lord Norreys attended Eton College in Windsor.

== Career ==
Bertie served as High Steward of Abingdon and the Deputy Lieutenant of Berkshire. His father had served as Lord Lieutenant of Berkshire from 1854 until 1881 and his grandfather before him from 1826 until 1854. Upon his father's death in 1884, he succeeded to the peerage as the 7th Earl of Abingdon and the 11th Lord Norris.

As Lord Norreys, he entered the Royal Berkshire Militia as a Lieutenant on 12 March 1858, resigned but was then appointed Major in 1861 by his father, the Lord Lieutenant. He commanded the regiment (later the 3rd Reserve Battalion, Princess Charlotte of Wales (Royal Berkshire Regiment)) from 31 July 1863 as Lieutenant-Colonel, and after his retirement was appointed its Honorary Colonel on 27 October 1880. He was also a Justice of the Peace for Oxfordshire and Berkshire and served on the governing body of Abingdon School from 1901 to 1915.

Following the death of his first wife's brother-in-law, Thomas O'Hagan in 1885, he inherited the Towneley family trustee position at the British Museum.

== Personal life ==
On 10 July 1858, he married Caroline Theresa Towneley (1838–1873) at the Royal Bavarian Chapel in London. She was the daughter and co-heiress of Colonel Charles Towneley, a Member of Parliament for Sligo, and Lady Caroline Molyneux (daughter of William Molyneux, 2nd Earl of Sefton). They lived at Wytham Abbey in Berkshire (now Oxfordshire) and had four surviving children:

- Lady Mary Caroline Bertie (1859–1938), who married Edmund FitzAlan-Howard, 1st Viscount FitzAlan of Derwent (the last Lord Lieutenant of Ireland) on 5 August 1879.
- Capt. Montagu Charles Francis Bertie, Lord Norreys (1860–1919), who predeceased his father. He married Rose Riversdale Glynn, granddaughter of George Glyn, 1st Baron Wolverton, with issue:
  - Montagu Towneley-Bertie, 13th Earl of Lindsey and 8th Earl of Abingdon
- Hon. Arthur John Bertie (26 December 1861 – 10 January 1862), died aged 15 days
- Lady Alice Josephine Bertie (1865–1950), who married Sir Gerald Portal on 1 February 1890. After his death, she married Maj. Robert Reyntiens on 5 October 1897.
- Lady Cecil Josephine Bertie (1873–1895), who married Brig-Gen. Paul Aloysius Kenna on 18 July 1895.

After the death of his first wife in 1873, he remarried to Gwendoline Mary Dormer (1865–1942) on 16 October 1883. Gwendoline was the daughter of James Charlemagne Dormer, a British Army officer who was only two years Bertie's senior. Together, they were the parents of four more children:

- Lady Gwendoline Theresa Mary "Goonie" Bertie (1885–1941), who married John, son of Conservative politician Lord Randolph Churchill and the American heiress Jennie Jerome, and brother of Winston Churchill.
- Maj. Hon. Arthur Michael Cosmo Bertie (1886–1957), who married Aline Rose Ramsay, daughter of George Arbuthnot-Leslie, on 15 May 1929. After her death, he married Lilian Isabel Crackanthorpe, daughter of Charles Edward Cary-Elwes, on 7 May 1949.
- Lt-Cdr. Hon. James Willoughby Bertie (1901–1966), who married Lady Jean Crichton-Stuart, daughter of John Crichton-Stuart, 4th Marquess of Bute, on 12 June 1928.
- Lady Elizabeth Constance Mary Bertie (1895–1987), married first Major Sigismund Trafford on 21 April 1914. After his death, she married Col. Henry Cartwright on 5 September 1956.

In 1911, he broke up and sold the family estates at Albury and Great Haseley.

The Earl of Abingdon died on 10 March 1928, aged 91, at Oaken Holt in Oxfordshire, in South East England. He was buried at Abingdon Abbey in Abingdon. His widow lived to age 77 and died on 16 September 1942.

=== Descendants ===
From his first marriage, and through his eldest daughter, he was a grandfather to Henry FitzAlan-Howard, 2nd Viscount FitzAlan of Derwent, who served as a captain in the First World War and was wounded. Through his eldest son, he was the grandfather of Montagu Towneley-Bertie, who succeeded his grandfather in his titles. Through his daughter, Lady Alice Bertie, he was the grandfather of Priscilla Reyntiens, a London councillor whose second marriage was to Montagu Norman, 1st Baron Norman, governor of the Bank of England.

Reyntiens had two sons from her first marriage to Alexander Koch de Gooreynd, Simon Towneley and Peregrine Worsthorne.

From his second marriage, and through his daughter Lady Gwendoline Bertie, he was the grandfather of the artist John Spencer-Churchill and Clarissa Spencer-Churchill, who married Anthony Eden, the Conservative Prime Minister of the United Kingdom in the mid-1950s. Through his son Hon. Arthur Bertie, he was the grandfather of Richard Bertie, 14th Earl of Lindsey. Through his youngest son, The Hon. James Bertie, he was the grandfather of Andrew Bertie, 78th Prince and Grand Master of the Sovereign Military Order of Malta. Through his youngest child, daughter Lady Elizabeth Bertie, he was the grandfather of Sophie de Trafford, who married Charles Lyell, 2nd Baron Lyell and great-grandfather of Charles Lyell, 3rd Baron Lyell.

Peerage of England
Preceded by Montagu Bertie	Earl of Abingdon; 1884–1928	Succeeded by Montagu Towneley-Bertie
