= Bowyer Sparke =

British bishop

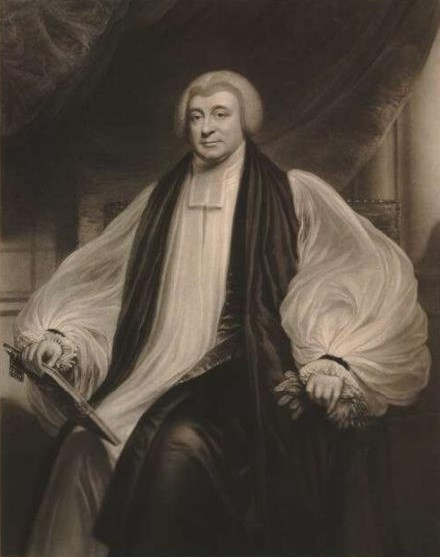
Bowyer Edward Sparke

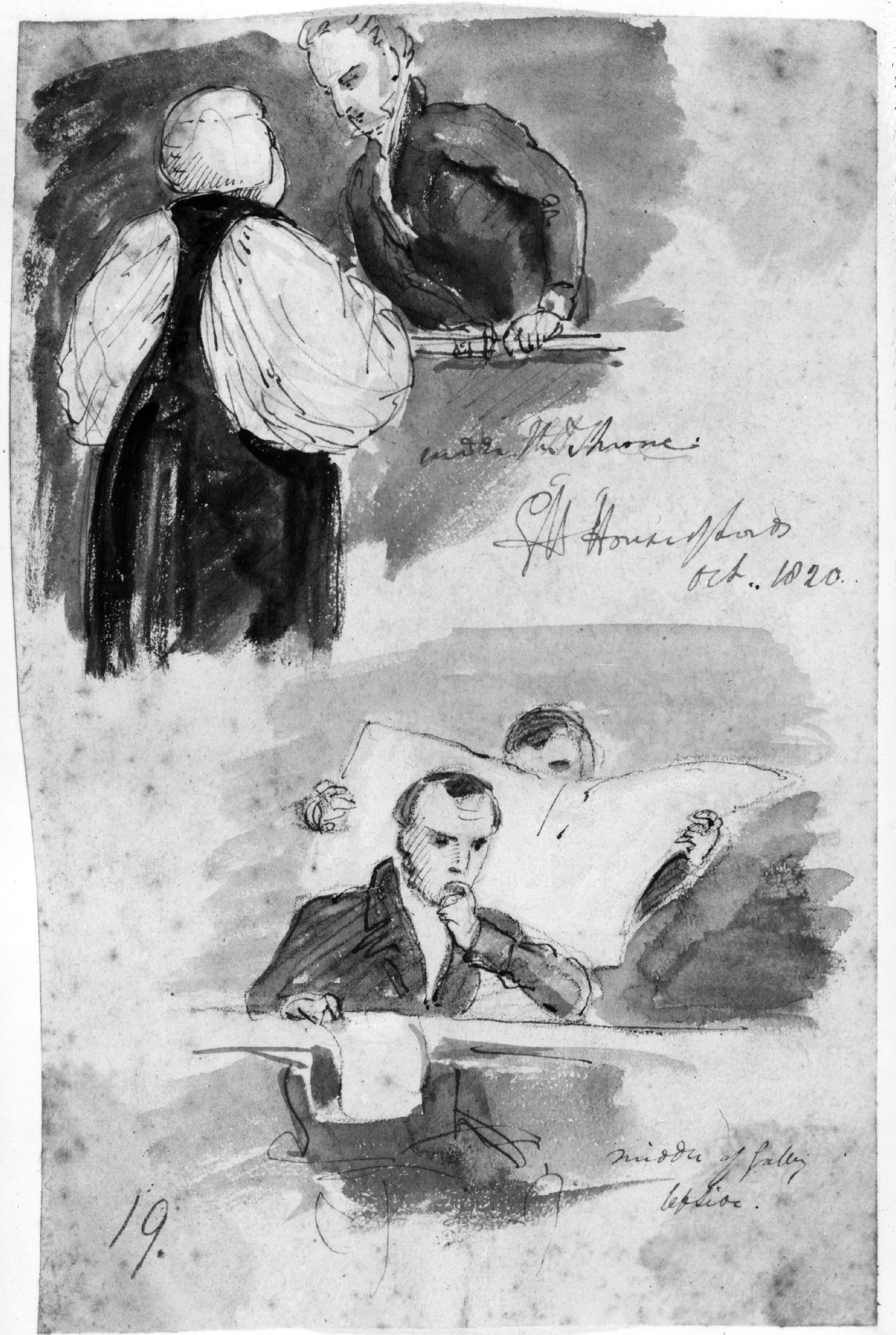
Bowyer Edward Sparke and other figures, by Sir George Hayter (died 1871).

Bowyer Edward Sparke (27 April 1759 – 4 April 1836) was an English bishop.

== Life ==
He was born at Bury St Edmunds, and was admitted a pensioner at Pembroke College, Cambridge on 27 October 1777, where he matriculated in 1778. He graduated B.A. in 1782 and M.A. in 1785; he was D.D. 1803. He became a Fellow of his college in 1784.

He was tutor to John Manners, 5th Duke of Rutland, who then found him a rectory. He was vicar of Scalford, Leicestershire from 1800 to 1805, and vicar of Redmile, 1800 to 1809. He was vicar of St Augustine-the-Less, Bristol, from 1803 to 1810.

He became Dean of Bristol in 1803, Bishop of Chester in 1809, and was Bishop of Ely from 1812 until his death at an age of 77.

He was elected a Fellow of the Royal Society in 1810.

According to George W. E. Russell, Sparke gave so many of his best livings to his family that it was said locally that you could find your way across the Fens on a dark night "by the number of little Sparkes along the road."

He died at Ely House, Dover Street, London. His body was interred on 16 April 1836 in a vault in Bishop West's chapel at Ely Cathedral.

== Arms ==
Coat of arms of Bowyer Sparke
Escutcheon Checky Or and Vert a bend Ermine.

== Notes ==
Church of England titles
Preceded by Charles Layard	Dean of Bristol; 1803–1810	Succeeded by John Parsons
Preceded by Henry Majendie	Bishop of Chester; 1810–1812	Succeeded by George Henry Law
Preceded by Thomas Dampier	Bishop of Ely; 1812–1836	Succeeded by Joseph Allen
