= Anthony Watson (bishop) =

English bishop

- Bishop of Chichester
- Diocese: Diocese of Chichester
- In office: 1596 – 1605 (death)
- Predecessor: Thomas Bickley
- Successor: Lancelot Andrewes
- Other posts: Dean of Bristol (1590–1598); Lord High Almoner (1595–1605)

Orders
- Consecration: 15 August 1596

Personal details
- Born: c. 1549 Durham, County Durham, England
- Died: 10 September 1605 (aged approximately 56) Cheam, Surrey, England
- Buried: St Dunstan's, Cheam
- Denomination: Anglican
- Parents: Edward
- Spouse: unmarried
- Education: Christ's College, Cambridge

Anthony Watson (died 10 September 1605) was an English bishop.

== Early life and education ==
He was born in Durham. He was educated at Christ's College, Cambridge, where he matriculated in 1567, graduated Bachelor of Arts (BA) in 1572, and was ordained a deacon and priest on 7 May 1573 at Peterborough. He became a Fellow of Christ's (1573–1583), and graduated Cambridge Master of Arts (MA Cantab) in 1575; he was incorporated at Oxford in 1577, later becoming a Bachelor of Divinity (BD) in 1582 and a Doctor of Divinity (DD) in 1596.

== Priest ==
He was Rector of Cheam, Surrey from 1581, presented by John Lumley, 1st Baron Lumley. He continued to reside there for the rest of his life. At that point Nonsuch Palace belonged to Lumley, and Watson wrote a significant Latin description of it, from the 1580s, and surviving in manuscript. He became Dean of Bristol in April 1590; in 1592 Lumley presented him as Rector of Storrington, Sussex (which post he held until his death); he also served as canon chancellor (in the Wedmore Secunda prebend) of Wells (July 1592–1596).

== Bishop ==
He became Lord High Almoner in 1595, and Bishop of Chichester in 1596; serving as both until death. He attended Elizabeth I during her terminal illness and at her death bed and participated in the Hampton Court Conference of 1604.
