= Samuel Crossman =

British minister and hymn writer

- Born: 1623; Bradfield St George
- Died: 4 February 1683 (aged 59–60); Bristol

Samuel Crossman (1623 – 4 February 1683) was a minister of the Church of England and a hymn writer. He was born at Bradfield Monachorum, now known as Bradfield St George, Suffolk, England.

Crossman earned a Bachelor of Divinity at Pembroke College, University of Cambridge. After graduation, he ministered to both an Anglican congregation at All Saints, Sudbury, and to a Puritan congregation simultaneously.

Crossman sympathised with the Puritan cause, and attended the 1661 Savoy Conference, which attempted to update the Book of Common Prayer so that both Puritans and Anglicans could use it. The conference failed, and the 1662 Act of Uniformity expelled Crossman along with some 2,000 other Puritan-leaning ministers from the Church of England. He renounced his Puritan affiliations shortly afterwards, and was ordained in 1665, becoming a royal chaplain. He was appointed Prebendary of Bristol Cathedral in 1667 and vicar of Nicholas' Church in Bristol. After becoming treasurer of Bristol Cathedral in 1682, he became Dean in 1683.

He died on 4 February 1683 (O.S.; 1684 N.S. – see Old Style and New Style dates), at Bristol, and lies buried in the south aisle of the cathedral at Bristol.

Upon his death, the Cathedral chancellor wrote "Mr Crossman, our new Dean, died this morning: a man lamented by few either of the city or neighbourhood. He hath left a debt upon our church of £300."

Nine of his hymns were published in The Young Man's Meditation, bound with his The Young Mans Monitor in 1664. The merits of his hymns were not recognised until 1868, when one was included in the Anglican Hymn Book with its popularity regarded a phenomenon of the century.

Several of Crossman's hymns are preserved in the Sacred Harp.

== Samuel Crossman’s works ==
- Jerusalem On High
- My Song Is Love Unknown
- The Young Man's Meditation, or Some Few Sacred Poems upon Select Subjects, and Scriptures.
- Sweet Place
