= William Levett (dean of Bristol) =

William Levett (also spelled William Levet) (ca. 1643–1694) was the Oxford-educated personal chaplain to Edward Hyde, 1st Earl of Clarendon, whom he accompanied into exile in France, then became the rector of two parishes, and subsequently Principal of Magdalen Hall, Oxford (now Hertford College, Oxford) and the Dean of Bristol.

== Family background ==
Levett was born in Ashwell, Rutland, to an Anglo-Norman family with roots in Sussex going back to the Norman Conquest. His father Rev. Richard Levett, born in Melton Mowbray, Leicestershire, and a graduate of Magdalen Hall, Oxford, was the intruding rector at Ashwell from 1646 until 1660. After Rev. Richard Levett was turned out of the parish of Ashwell, he wrote to Edward Heath of London, soliciting the rector's job in Cottesmore, Rutland, which Heath's family owned.

William Levett had at least two brothers, Richard, who became Lord Mayor of London, and Francis, an international trader; these two were in business together. Their uncle William Levett was a courtier and groom of the bedchamber to King Charles I and accompanied to the monarch to his execution. Later Levett set off a firestorm when he provided a letter stating that he had seen the late King write the Eikon Basilike.

== Education and career ==
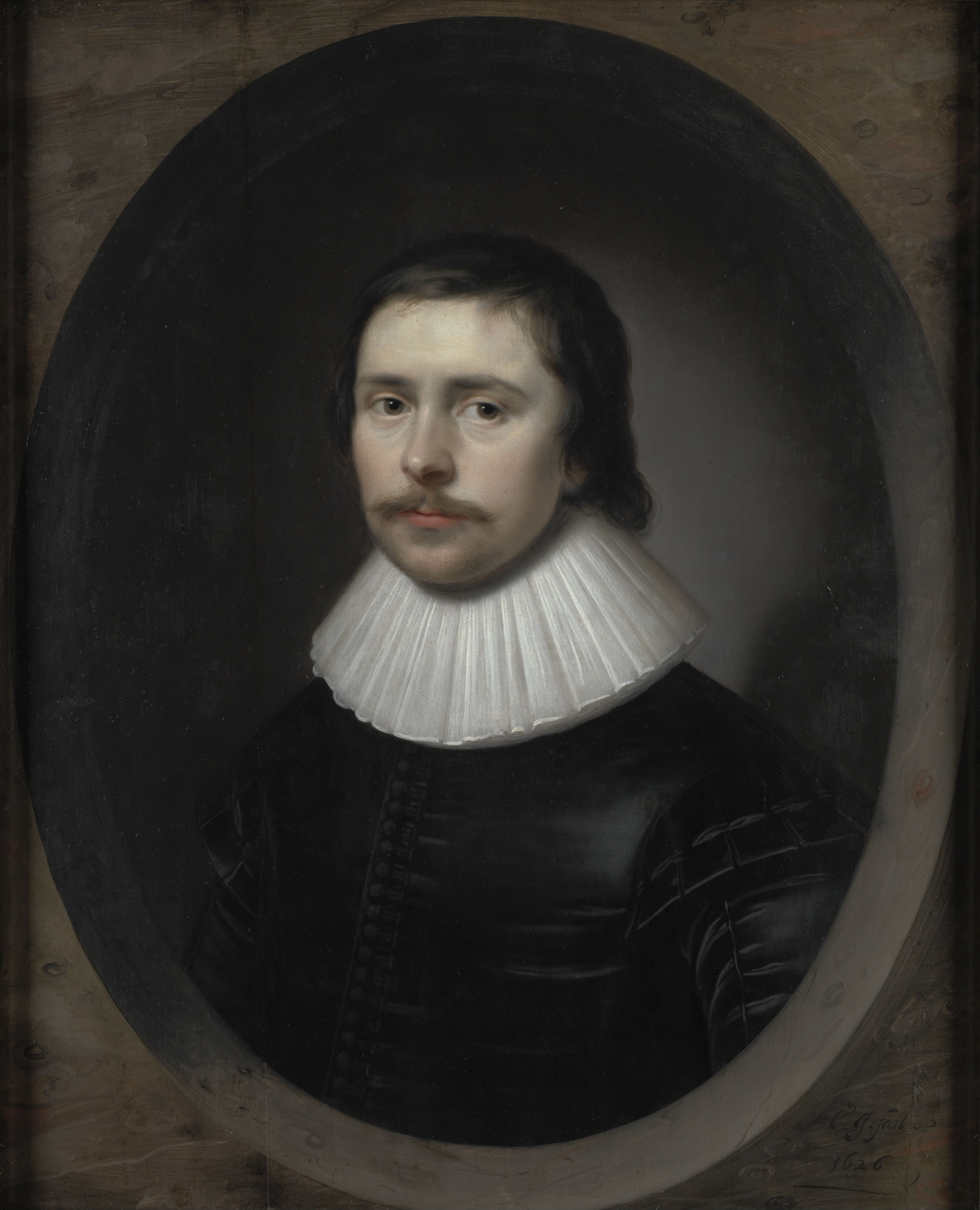
Edward Hyde, 1st Earl of Clarendon

William Levett was educated at Christ Church, Oxford, where he became a fellow, in 1663. After his graduation with a doctorate of divinity, he entered the service of the first Earl of Clarendon (1609-1674), historian and statesman who went into exile in France. Levett accompanied him there, returning to England in 1672 and becoming rector of Husbands Bosworth in Leicestershire. Four years later he became vicar of Flore, Northamptonshire.

In 1681 he was named Principal of Magdalen Hall at Oxford, succeeding James Hyde. Hyde, who was the eleventh son of Sir Laurence Hyde of Heale, near Salisbury, was a barrister and a physician as well as Member of Parliament. Hyde himself had been nominated Principal by his relation, the Earl of Clarendon, who was Chancellor of the university, and he took office in 1662. On his death in 1681, the Principal's slot passed to Dr. Levett, another favourite of the Hydes.

In 1685 Levett became Dean of Bristol. Levett was well known to many Oxford contemporaries, and remained friends with the Earl of Clarendon and his second son Laurence Hyde, 1st Earl of Rochester for the rest of his life. Among his fellow churchmen, Levett seems to have been held in high regard. Levett held all four positions—his appointments to both parishes, as well as his Magdalen Hall principalship and his Deanship of Bristol—until his death.

== Death and legacy ==
In his will Levett directed his body be decently interred, "without any manner of speech, or funerall oration, or either good or bad verses, and without any opening of it, or the least dissection of it whatever" in the Cathedral at Christ Church. The invitations should be sent out and the body carried in such a way, Levett directed, so as to permit the service to be carried out at the "canonical houre" of 4 p.m. exactly. When word of Dean Levett's death reached Oxford on 11 February 1694, a Sunday morning, bells were rung in honour of the late Principal.

Levett left bequests of £50 for the Christ Church library; £20 to Magdalen Hall; £5 for books at Corpus Christi College, Oxford library; and monies to the poor apprentice boys of Husband's Bosworth and Flore. The will mentions his namesake nephew William Levett, second son of his brother Sir Richard Levett. The sole executor of Levett's estate was Dr. Henry Levett of the London Charterhouse, fellow of Exeter College, Oxford, and son of Dean Levett's uncle, courtier William Levett of Swindon and Savernake, Wiltshire. Dean Levett was survived by five daughters.
