= Daniel Peter Layard =

English physician and midwife

Daniel Peter Layard, FRS, FSA (1721–1802) was an English physician and midwife.

== Biography ==
Daniel Peter Layard was the son of Pierre Raymond de Layard (1666-1747), a Huguenot of good parentage of Monflanquin in Guienne (Lot et Garonne), who fled from France following the Revocation of the Edict of Nantes. Pierre Raymond came to England as a member of the Corps of Noble Cadets of William III, and rose to the rank of Major in the British army in 1710, at which time he was in General Vezey's Regiment of Foot. Having become naturalized British in 1713, he settled in Canterbury, and married, at the French Protestant chapel at the Savoy Chapel in London in February 1715, to a much younger wife, Marie Anne la Crozé. They had several children, most of whom died and were buried at St Alphege, Canterbury. Daniel Peter Delayard was born 28 March and baptized 8 April 1720 at the French Huguenot chapel of Des Grecs, Crown Street, Westminster. His father died in Westminster in 1747. His mother lived down to 1773, and died testate in London.

Layard graduated Doctor of Medicine at Reims University on 9 March 1742. On 9 August of the following year (as Surgeon, of St Anne's Westminster), he married Suzanna Henrietta Boisragon at the Savoy chapel. In April 1747 he was appointed physician-accoucheur at Middlesex Hospital, but shortly afterwards he resigned on account of ill health and travelled abroad.

In 1750 Layard settled at Huntingdon, practising there for twelve years. On 3 July 1752 he was admitted a Licentiate of the College of Physicians (now the Royal College of Physicians of London). In c. 1762 he returned to London, where he soon obtained an extensive practice as an accoucheur.

Layard was physician to Princess Augusta of Saxe-Gotha, Princess, and Dowager Princess, of Wales. He was elected a Fellow of the Royal Society and a Fellow of the Royal Society of Sciences of Göttingen (now the Göttingen Academy of Sciences and Humanities). Layard was a founder of the British Lying-in Hospital, of which he was later appointed a Vice President. On 20 June 1792 he was admitted to the degree of Doctor of Civil Law honoris causa at the University of Oxford.

Layard died at Greenwich in February 1802, leaving a will, and requested burial in a private crypt in St Benet's, Paul's Wharf, and that his late wife's remains should be brought there from their original burial-place at St Martin in the Fields. He refers to the King's pleasure his wish that his unpublished manuscripts should be published for the financial benefit of his children; he refers particularly to the national services he has performed for the prevention and cure of afflictions of black cattle in Great Britain and other European countries between 1769 and 1793, for which he anticipates reward or compensation of not less than £20,000; and he appoints Brownlow Bertie, 5th Duke of Ancaster and Kesteven to be his executor.

His son Charles had become Dean of Bristol.

== Works ==
Layard contributed papers to the Philosophical Transactions of the Royal Society and published:

- An Essay on the Nature, Causes, and Cure of the Contagious Distemper among the Horned Cattle in these Kingdoms (London, 1757)
- An Essay on the Bite of a Mad Dog (London, 1762)
- An Account of the Somersham Water in the County of Huntingdon (London, 1767)
- Pharmacopœia in usum Gravidarum Puerperarum (London, 1776)

== Family ==
Layard was the father of Charles Peter Layard (born 1748; successively Prebendary of Bangor Cathedral, in 1793 Prebendary of Worcester Cathedral, and in 1800 Dean of Bristol; died 1808), and great-grandfather of Austen Henry Layard. He was the great-great-grandfather of Nina Frances Layard, and the great-great-great-grandfather of John Willoughby Layard.

== Notes ==
Attribution

This article incorporates text from a publication now in the public domain: Goodwin, Gordon (1892). "Layard, Daniel Peter". In Lee, Sidney (ed.). Dictionary of National Biography. Vol. 32. London: Smith, Elder & Co.. Goodwin depends largely upon Munk (1878).
