= Samuel Creswicke =

Samuel Creswicke was an Anglican priest.

He was the Dean of Bristol from 1730 to 1739 and then Dean of Wells between 1739 and 1766.
