= John Darwall =

English clergyman and hymnodist

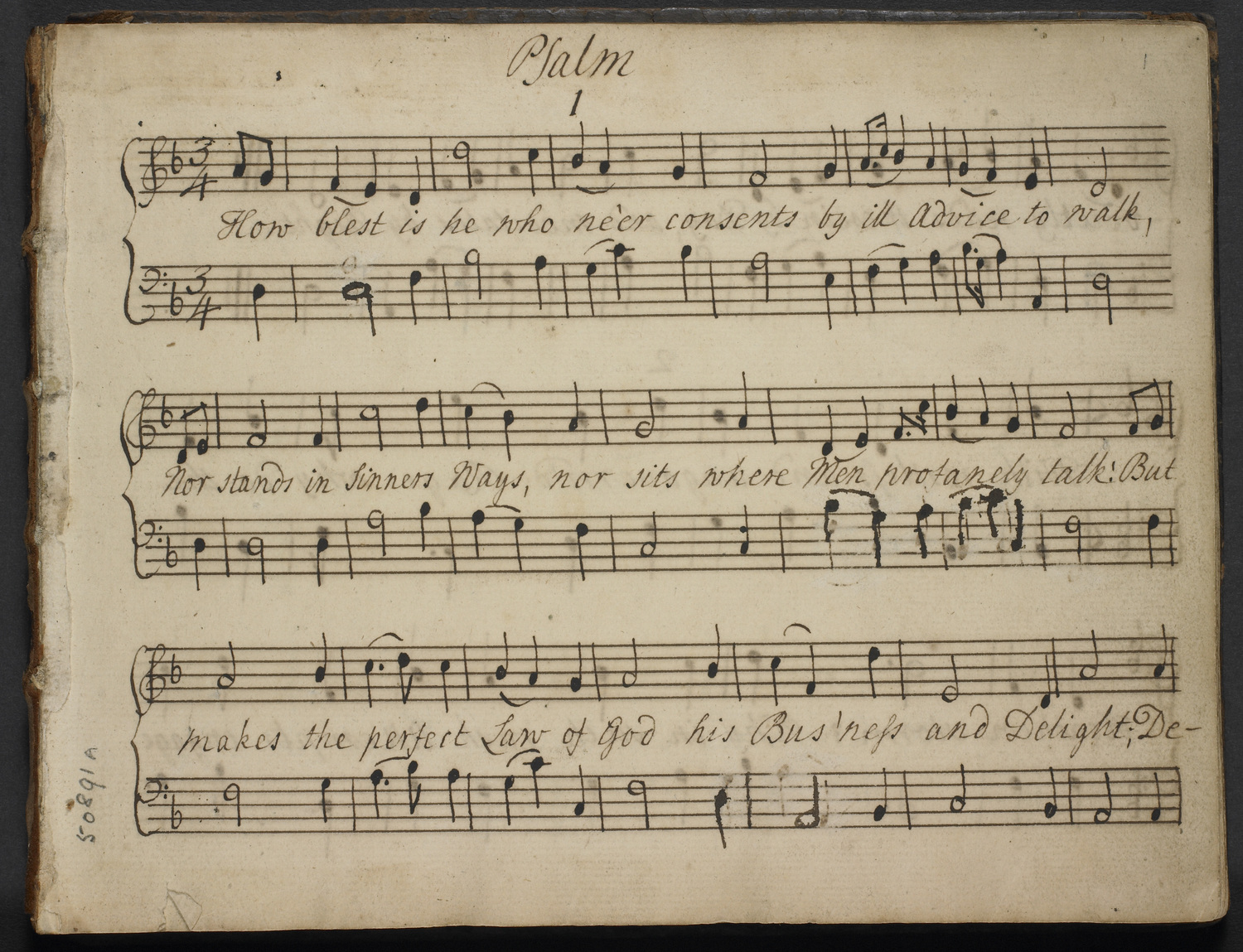
First page of an autograph manuscript of a tune by John Darwall for Psalm 1, in the metrical version by Tate and Brady.

John Darwall (1731–1789) was an English clergyman and hymnodist.

Born in the village of Haughton in Staffordshire, Darwall was educated at Manchester Grammar School and at Brasenose College, Oxford (which he entered at the age of 15), graduating in 1756. He then became curate and later vicar of St Matthew's Parish in Walsall. In 1766 he married Mary Whateley (1738–1825), his second wife, a published poet who ran a printing press and also wrote hymns. He died on 18 December 1789 at Walsall in the West Midlands. He was buried at the Bath Street Burial Grounds.

He is probably best known for his setting of Psalm 148, known as DARWALL'S 148th, which is most often sung to the words "Rejoice the Lord is King" (from Charles Wesley's Moral and Sacred Poems of 1744) and to "Ye holy angels bright" (from Richard Baxter's Poetical Fragments of 1681). It was first sung at the inauguration of a new organ in 1773.

Darwall also wrote many tunes for the New Version of Nahum Tate and Nicholas Brady, as well as poetry published in The Gentleman's Magazine.

== Son ==
Darwall's son, also John, was vicar in 1796 and Lecturer of St John's Chapel, Deritend, Birmingham.
