= George Royse =

Dean of Bristol (died 1671)

George Royse DD (b. Martock, 27 May 1655 – d. 23 April 1708) was Dean of Bristol from 1694 until his death.

Royse's first Oxford college was St Edmund Hall, Oxford. After that he became a Fellow of Oriel College, Oxford. He was Provost of Oriel from 1691 until 1708. He was also Rector of Newington, Oxfordshire during the same dates.
