= Edward Chetwynd =

English churchman (1577–1639)

Edward Chetwynd (1577–1639) was an English churchman who was Dean of Bristol from 1617.

== Education and career ==
Born 1577, at Ingestre, he entered Exeter College, Oxford, in 1592, where he graduated B.A. in 1595, M.A. in 1598, and B.D. in 1606. He was chosen lecturer to the Corporation of Abingdon in 1606, and in the following year lecturer to the Corporation of Bristol. In 1613, he was appointed Chaplain to Queen Anne of Denmark. He took the degree of D.D. in 1616, and was appointed Dean of Bristol in 1617. He also held the vicarages of Banwell in Somerset and Berkeley, Gloucestershire, and was Rector of Sutton Coldfield before 1617.

== Personal life ==
He published Concio ad Clerum pro gradu habita Oxoniae 19 Dec. 1607, Oxford, and some sermons. The cleric John Chetwynd or Chetwind was his son; he married Helena, daughter of John Harington as his second wife in 1620. He died in 1639, aged 61 or 62.
