= Montague Bertie, 11th Earl of Lindsey =

Montague Peregrine Bertie, 11th Earl of Lindsey, DL (26 December 1815 – 27 January 1899), styled The Honourable Montague Bertie until 1877, was an English nobleman, soldier, and landowner, the second son of Albemarle Bertie, 9th Earl of Lindsey and his wife Charlotte.

Like his elder sister, Lady Charlotte Guest, Montague was a voracious reader, and had an excellent memory; but he unfortunately resembled his elder brother, George, in being unworldly and unsuited for adult life.

Bertie was educated at Eton, and subsequently entered the 81st Regiment of Foot on 13 July 1832 as an ensign. He was made ensign and lieutenant in the Grenadier Guards on 21 March 1834 and purchased the rank of lieutenant and captain on 28 June 1839. On 10 August 1849, he was made a deputy lieutenant of Lincolnshire.

On 30 May 1854 in London, he married Felicia Elizabetha Welby (1835–1927)), daughter of the Reverend John Earle Welby (1786–1867), who was son of Sir William Earle Welby, 1st Baronet. and brother of Reginald Welby, 1st Baron Welby. Her mother was Felicia Elizabetha Hole (1797–1888), daughter of the Reverend Humphrey Aram Hole (1763–1814) and granddaughter of the Reverend George Horne. The couple had one son:

- Montague Bertie, 12th Earl of Lindsey (1861–1938)

Montague succeeded his brother as 11th Earl of Lindsey in 1877 and died in 1899.

Peerage of England
Preceded by George Bertie	Earl of Lindsey; 1877–1899	Succeeded by Montague Bertie
