= John Hallam (priest) =

John Hallam DD (1728 – 26 August 1811) was a Canon of Windsor from 1775 to 1811.

== Family ==
He was the father of the historian Henry Hallam.

== Career ==
He was educated at Boston Grammar School before being removed to Eton College in 1743. He entered King's College, Cambridge in 1748 and graduated BA in 1753, MA in 1756, and DD in 1781.

He was appointed:

- Dean of Bristol 1781–1800

He was appointed to the sixth stall in St George's Chapel, Windsor Castle in 1775 and held the canonry until 1811.
