= George Bertie, 10th Earl of Lindsey =

English noble

George Augustus Frederick Albemarle Bertie, 10th Earl of Lindsey, DL (4 November 1814 – 21 March 1877) was the eldest son of Albemarle Bertie, 9th Earl of Lindsey.

George was styled Lord Bertie from his birth until his accession to the earldom in 1818. Lindsey was of "weak intellect", and posed something of a family problem. After a visit by Lindsey in 1841, George Cruikshank wrote to Charles Dickens (who had given Lindsey a note of introduction) to comment that his wife had at first thought Lindsey "either drunk or mad". As a consequence, his public life was very limited, although on 10 August 1849, he was made a Deputy Lieutenant of Lincolnshire. Upon his death in 1877, he was succeeded by his brother Montague Bertie.

Peerage of England
Preceded by Albemarle Bertie	Earl of Lindsey; 1818–1877	Succeeded by Montague Bertie
