= Dean of Bristol =

Church of England senior clergy member

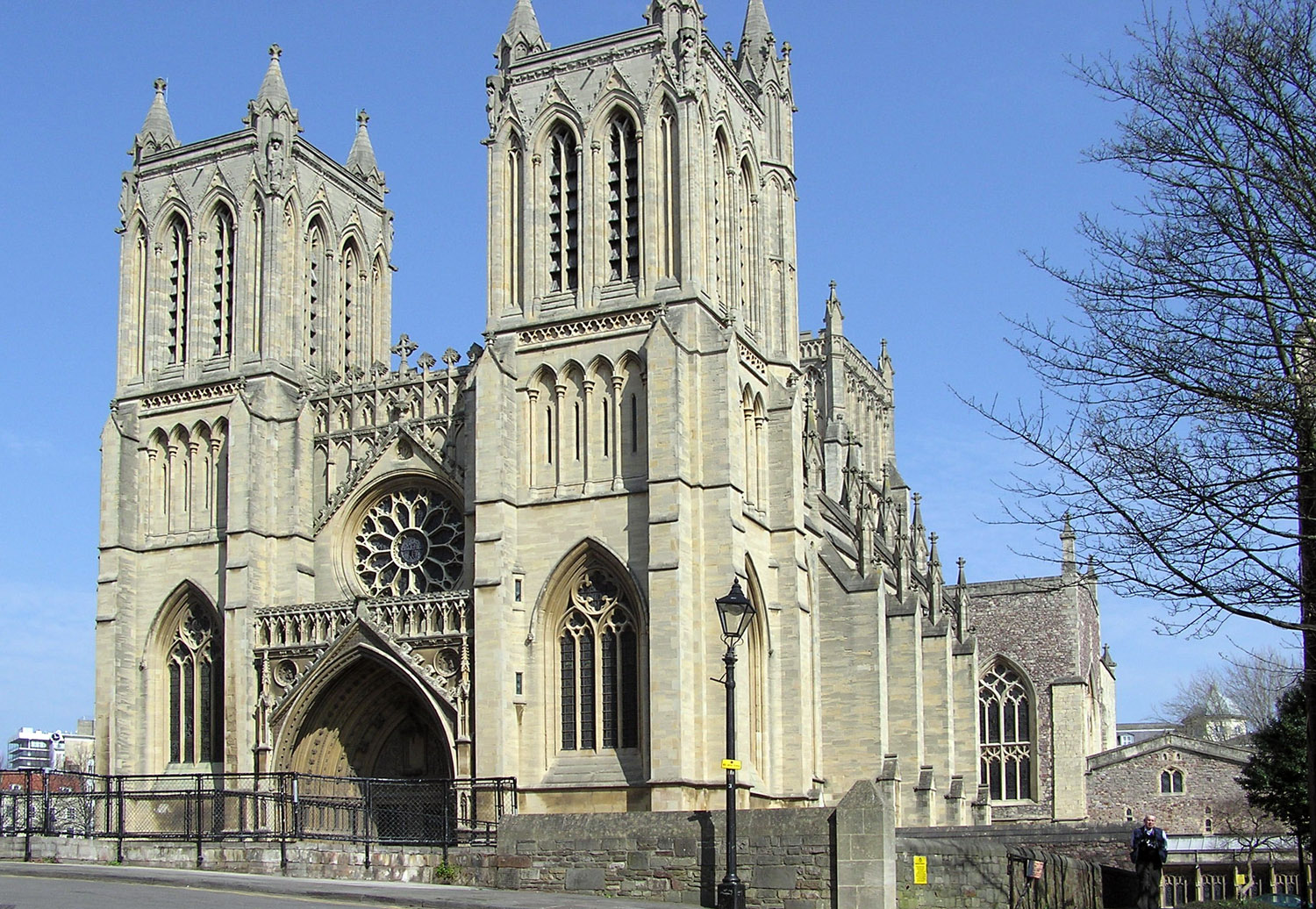
The west front entrance of Bristol Cathedral.

The dean of Bristol is the head of the Chapter of the Cathedral Church of the Holy and Undivided Trinity, Bristol, England. The current dean is Mandy Ford, since her installation on 3 October 2020.

== List of deans ==
=== Early modern ===
- 1542–1551 William Snow (previously last prior of Bradenstoke)
- 1551–1552 John Whiteheare
- 1552–1554 George Carew (deprived)
- 1554–1559 Henry Joliffe (deprived)
- 1559–1580 George Carew (restored)
- 1580–1590 John Sprint
- 1590–1598 Anthony Watson
- 1598–1617 Simon Robson
- 1617–1639 Edward Chetwynd
- 1639–1660 Matthew Nicholas (afterwards Dean of St Paul's, 1660)
- 1660–1667 Henry Glemham
- 1667–1683 Richard Towgood
- 1683–1684 Samuel Crossman
- 1684–1685 Richard Thompson
- 1685–1694 William Levett
- 1694–1708 George Royse
- 1708–1730 Robert Booth
- 1730–1739 Samuel Creswick (afterwards Dean of Wells)
- 1739–1757 Thomas Chamberlayne
- 1757–1760 William Warburton
- 1760–1761 Samuel Squire (afterwards Bishop of St David's, 1761)
- 1761–1763 Francis Ayscough
- 1763–1780 Cutts Barton
- 1781–1799 John Hallam

=== Late modern ===
- 1800–1803 Charles Layard
- 1803–1810 Bowyer Sparke
- 1810–1813 John Parsons
- 1813–1837 Henry Beeke
- May–October 1837 Thomas Musgrave
- 1837–1850 John Lamb
- 1850–1891 Gilbert Elliot
- 1891–1916 Francis Pigou
- 1916–1921 Basil Wynne Willson (afterwards Bishop of Bath and Wells, 1926)
- 1922–1926 Edward Burroughs (afterwards Bishop of Ripon, 1926)
- 1926–1933 Henry de Candole
- 1934–1951 Harry Blackburne
- c. 1951–1957 Evered Lunt (afterwards Suffragan Bishop of Stepney, 1957)
- 1957–1972 Douglas Harrison
- 1973–1987 Horace Dammers
- 1987–1997 Wesley Carr (afterwards Dean of Westminster, 1997)
- 1997–2009 Robert Grimley
- 2009–2010 Andrew Tremlett; acting dean
- 2010–2019 David Hoyle
- 2019-2020 Michael Johnson; acting dean
- 3 October 2020 – present Mandy Ford

== Sources ==
- British History — Houses of Augustinian canons
- British History — Deans of Bristol
