= Kerby (Ipswich martyr) =

British martyr

Kerby (d. Ipswich, 1546), whose Christian name is not known, was a man condemned by the Justices and executed by burning at the stake in Ipswich, Suffolk, for his Protestant beliefs, along with Roger Clarke. He is numbered among the Ipswich Martyrs. He died for denying the Roman Catholic doctrine of transubstantiation of the Host.

This was the first recorded execution by burning in Ipswich for such a cause, but was followed by several others over the ensuing twelve years, so that by the death of Queen Mary in 1558 there are said to have been seventy-seven persons in Ipswich under condemnation, who were afterwards released. Ipswich had witnessed the arrest of Thomas Bilney in May 1527 and was the birthplace and childhood home of Thomas Wolsey.

== Imprisonment of Messrs. Kerby and Roger ==
Kerby was one of two men, the other surnamed Roger, who stood accused under the terms of the Act of Six Articles of not accepting the doctrine of transubstantiation. The two were imprisoned in the town gaol which was then located in the West Gate, a mediaeval stone and brick structure which stood on the line of the town ramparts very near to the famous pilgrim chapel of Our Lady of Ipswich. Their gaoler was John Bird, a sympathetic man who had already run close to implication under similar charges, and was much later actually accused by the Commissioners. An important figure instrumental in the accusation against Kerby and Roger was one William Foster, a Justice living at Copdock (a little south of Ipswich), who was later very active in the arrests of the martyrs Rowland Taylor, Robert Samuel, Agnes Potten and Joan Trunchfield.

== Visits in prison ==
During his imprisonment, Kerby was visited by Robert Wingfield, the young heir of Humphrey Wingfield, with Master Breuss of Wenham. Wingfield attempted to dissuade him from his course, saying "Remember, the fire is hot; take heed of thine enterprise, that thou take no more upon thee than thou shalt be able to perform. The terror is great, the pain will be extreme; and life is sweet. Better it were betimes to stick to mercy, while there is hope of life, than rashly to begin, and then to shrink." Kerby replied, "Oh, Master Wingfield, be at my burning, and you shall say, 'There standeth a Christian soldier in the fire.' For I know that fire and water and sword and all other things are in the hands of God, and he will suffer no more to be laid upon us, than he will give us strength to bear." Wingfield answered, "Ah, Kerby! if thou be at that point, I will bid thee farewell, for I promise thee I am not so strong that I am able to burn."

== An appeal to justice ==
The Examination was to take place in the old Town Hall of Ipswich (on the site of the present Town Hall), in the remains of the mediaeval church of St Mildred, beside the Corn Hill. The night before, a bill was nailed to the door by an unknown person, carrying the following words:

Juste judicate filii hominum: Yet, when ye shall judge, minister your justice with mercy.
A fearful thing it is to fall into the hands of the living God: be ye learned, therefore, in true knowledge, ye that judge the earth, lest the Lord be angry with you.
The blood of the righteous shall be required at your hands. What though the veil hanged before Moses' face, yet at Christ's death it fell down.
The stones will speak if these should hold their peace: Therefore harden not your hearts against the verity. For fearfully shall the Lord appear in the day of vengeance to the troubled in conscience. No excuse shall then be of ignorance. Therefore, have remorse in your conscience; fear Him that may kill both body and soul.
Beware of innocent blood-shedding; take heed of justice ignorantly administered; work discreetly as the Scripture doth command; look to it that ye make not the Truth to be forsaken.
We beseech God to save our King, King Henry the Eighth, that he be not led into temptation. So be it.

== The examination and condemnation ==
Next morning the bill was discovered and taken to Lord Wentworth, who was to conduct the examination, and he answered that 'the bill was good counsel.' The Justices assembled in the Town Hall, and the prisoners were brought in, who 'made their prayers secretly to God for a space of time' with eyes and hands lifted up to heaven. The articles were read to them, but even the first proved impossible to accept, that 'after the consecration [i.e., of the Host], there is present really the natural body and blood of our Saviour Jesus Christ, conceived of the Virgin Mary, and that after the said consecration there remaineth no substance of bread and wine.' the penalty for non-acceptance was prescribed to be 'death by burning, without any abjuration, benefit of the clergy, or sanctuary.'

To this article both Kerby and Roger replied that "they did not so believe," and "that there was neither flesh nor blood to be eaten with the teeth, but bread and wine; and yet more than bread and wine, for that it is consecrated to a holy use." Lord Wentworth pronounced the sentence of death upon them, at which Kerby held up his hands and, bowing devoutly with humble reverence, he said "Praised be Almighty God," and then stood there amid a profound silence. The judge leaned back to whisper a remark to one of his colleagues, whereupon Roger challenged him to say it openly if there was something on his conscience. Lord Wentworth, 'somewhat flushing and changing his countenance', answered "I did speak nothing of you, nor have I done anything unto you but as the law is." Kerby was sentenced to be burned in Ipswich on the following Saturday, and Roger at Bury St Edmunds on the Gang Monday following.

== The execution ==
A large crowd (many hundreds) of the public gathered on the Saturday to witness the execution, which was held at the Cornhill (then called the Market Place) outside the Town Hall. Adjacent was the market building called the 'Shambles', a large timbered structure with an arcade around the ground floor, and with a balcony above from which public spectacles could be viewed. A large company, including most of the neighbouring justices, were assembled there, and the stake, broom and brushwood faggots were set up in the centre of the Cornhill. Kerby was fastened to the stake with irons.

From the balcony of the Shambles Dr Rugham, formerly a monk of Bury St Edmunds, delivered a sermon, taking his text from Chapter 6 of the Gospel of St John. For there it is written, that in the Synagogue in Capernaum Christ said:

"I am the living bread which came down from heaven. If any man eat of this bread, he shall live for ever: and the bread that I will give is my flesh, which I will give for the life of the world." (vs. 51)
"Except ye eat the flesh of the Son of man, and drink his blood, ye have no life in you. Whoso eateth my flesh, and drinketh my blood, hath eternal life, and I will raise him up at the last day. For my flesh is meat indeed, and my blood is drink indeed.' (vs. 53-55)

As Dr Rugham delivered his sermon, Kerby interrupted with statements to the people telling them here to 'believe him', or there 'it is not true'.

The priest then called upon Kerby to declare again his belief concerning the sacrament of the mass, and Kerby replied again as before. The under-Sheriff then asked him if he had anything more to say. "Yea, sir, if you will give me leave," replied Kerby. "Say on." 'Then Kerby, taking his cap from his head, put it under his arm as though it should have done him service again; but, remembering himself, he cast it from him, and lifting up his arms he said the hymn Te Deum [We praise thee, O God, we acknowledge thee to be the Lord, etc.] and the Belief [i.e. the Credo, I believe in One God the Father Almighty, maker of heaven and earth, etc.], with other prayers in the English tongue.' At this Lord Wentworth, who stood in the gallery, was seen to turn aside behind one of the posts of the gallery, and weep, and many of the beholders wept also. The flames were kindled, and with a loud cry to God Kerby beat upon his breast 'so long as his remembrance would serve'; and, in the words of a modern writer, 'in a chariot of fire his soul passes into the unseen world.' As he died a great shout of admiration for his constancy went up from the crowd of witnesses.

== Sources ==
- John Foxe, The Booke of Martyrs
- N. F. Layard, Seventeen Suffolk Martyrs (Smiths, Ipswich 1903).
