= Ipswich Martyrs =

Nine English Protestants individually burned at the stake between 1515 and 1558

Coordinates: 52.061757°N 1.158797°E

The Ipswich Martyrs were nine people burnt at the stake for their Lollard or Protestant beliefs around 1515-1558. The executions were mainly carried out in the centre of Ipswich, Suffolk on The Cornhill, the square in front of Ipswich Town Hall. At that time the remains of the medieval church of St Mildred were used for the town's Moot Hall. Later, in 1645 Mary Lakeland was executed on the same site on the orders of Matthew Hopkins, the notorious Witchfinder General.

Other groups of Protestants were persecuted (and some martyred) in various parts of Suffolk during the same period, notably those of Hadleigh, Beccles, Yoxford, Laxfield, Wetheringsett, Stowmarket, Framsden, Hintlesham, Haverhill, Winston, Mendlesham, Stoke-by-Nayland, East Bergholt, Dedham, Thwaite, Bedfield, Crowfield, Long Melford, Somerton and Little Stonham. The most famous was Dr Rowland Taylor of Hadleigh, burnt on Aldham Common in 1555. His ghost is said to haunt both Hadleigh and Aldham.

== The Protestant martyrs ==
Protestant martyrdoms associated with Ipswich begin with:

- Thomas Bilney, who was plucked from the pulpit of St George's Chapel in St George's Street, just north of the Westgate, Ipswich, as he preached in favour of the Reformation in 1527. He had previously preached in St Margaret's church. This was during a preaching-tour undertaken with the Norfolk mass-priest Master Lambert. After being forced to recant he was imprisoned in the Tower of London for a year, and then returned to Trinity Hall, Cambridge for two years in great torment of conscience. In 1531 he went to Norwich and declared his convictions, and was there burnt at the stake.

Martyrs named on the Ipswich Memorial:

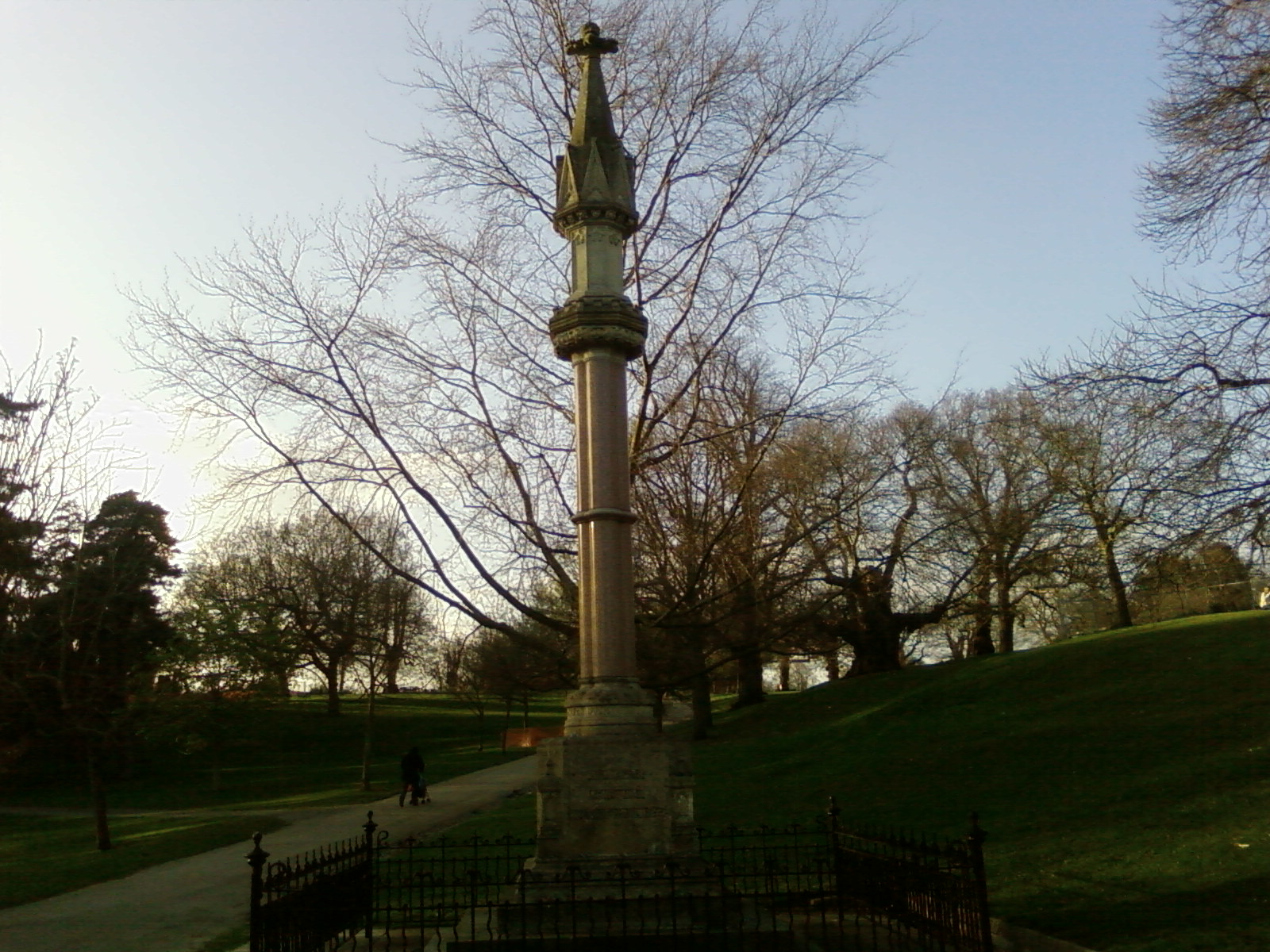
The monument in Christchurch Park at dusk

- Nicholas Peke (N. Peke), 1515 of Earl Soham. (Burnt at Ipswich)
- - Kerby, 1546. (Judged in Ipswich together with another man named Roger Clarke, and both being condemned, Kerby was burnt at Ipswich and Roger at Bury St Edmunds.)
- Robert Samuel, 1555. (A minister of East Bergholt, burnt at Ipswich.)
- Agnes Potten, 1556. (Agnes Potten and Joan Trunchfield, both of Ipswich, were condemned together and burnt together in one fire at Ipswich.)
- Joan Trunchfield, 1556. (See above.)
- John Tudson, 1556. (John Tudson of Ipswich was burnt at London.)
- William Pikes, 1558. (William Pikes of St Margaret's, Ipswich, was burned at Brentford.)
- Alexander Gooch, 1558.(Alexander Gooch (of Woodbridge, Suffolk) and Alice Driver (of Grundisburgh, Suffolk) were arrested together at Grundisburgh and both burnt on one day and in one fire at Ipswich.)
- Alice Driver, 1558. (See above.)

Also mentioned by Foxe:

- Anne Bolton (burnt at Ipswich)
- John and Michael Trunchefielde (both of St Leonard, Ipswich, condemned to be burnt)
- Agnes Wardal (of Ipswich, persecuted but escaped)

== Ipswich Martyrs' Memorial ==
A memorial to the martyrs was erected in Christchurch Park in 1903, a short distance from Christchurch Mansion. It can be found by walking from the front of the mansion towards the children's play area. The monument has a square, stone base that bears a testament to the martyrs on the front, and lists their names on the other three sides. It was designed and executed by the Art Memorial Company of West Norwood, and is 27 ft (8.2 m) high and 10 ft 6 in (3.20 m) square at the base. The base is of Ketton stone, and the shaft of polished red granite.

The Ipswich Martyrs' Memorial was funded by private subscription opened in November 1902, after attention had been drawn to the story of the martyrs in a series of newspaper articles by Nina Frances Layard in the East Anglian Daily Times between 1898 and 1900, which were then reissued as a book entitled Seventeen Suffolk Martyrs in 1902 (Smiths Suitall, Ipswich). It was originally hoped to erect it on the Cornhill, the site of the original stake in the Town centre, but this was changed after the entire project met with some local opposition. It was unveiled by the Very Rev. Henry Wace, D.D., the Dean of Canterbury, on Wednesday 16 December 1903, in the presence of the deputy-Mayor, the M.P. Sir William Brampton Gurdon, K.C.M.G., the Rev Canon Samuel Garratt and many others, including a deputation from the Bury St Edmund's Martyr's Memorial Committee.

The unveiling address
The Very Rev. Dean Wace delivered a very lengthy address, concerning the importance of the sacrifice made by the martyrs on behalf of the Reformed Faith, and of justification by faith. The idea propounded by Martin Luther was for men and women to stand face to face with God, and claim forgiveness and God's blessing from Him, without the intervention of any human being - then, it was claimed, a new spirit of life arose wherever the doctrine was believed. It was further claimed that this doctrine commanded a superlative sense of freedom of soul and power of mind i.e.: that the soul can have direct communion with God, and hence ensured safety in this world and in the next. This, it was claimed, was the charter of moral and religious freedom, and indeed of all freedom.

The Dean went on to speak of emancipation from Rome. The Church of Rome at that day, as the Church of Rome at this day, was a standing and eternal enemy of all liberty. With the Reformation Europe had passed through a great Revolution, and was now divided into two great parts, the one under Roman domination and the other asserting the great principles of Christian liberty. He was convinced that this country took a right step, and that we must never again part with that freedom by going back to the domination of Rome. "This country has been made by the Word of God. The effect of that Word upon the English character has been incalculable. I trust that the memorial will help to keep in mind the reading of the Bible, and above all, simple trust in God. The words of Latimer to Ridley, I would repeat to all - 'Play the man, for by God's grace we shall today light a candle in England which shall never be put out.'"

== Memorial texts ==
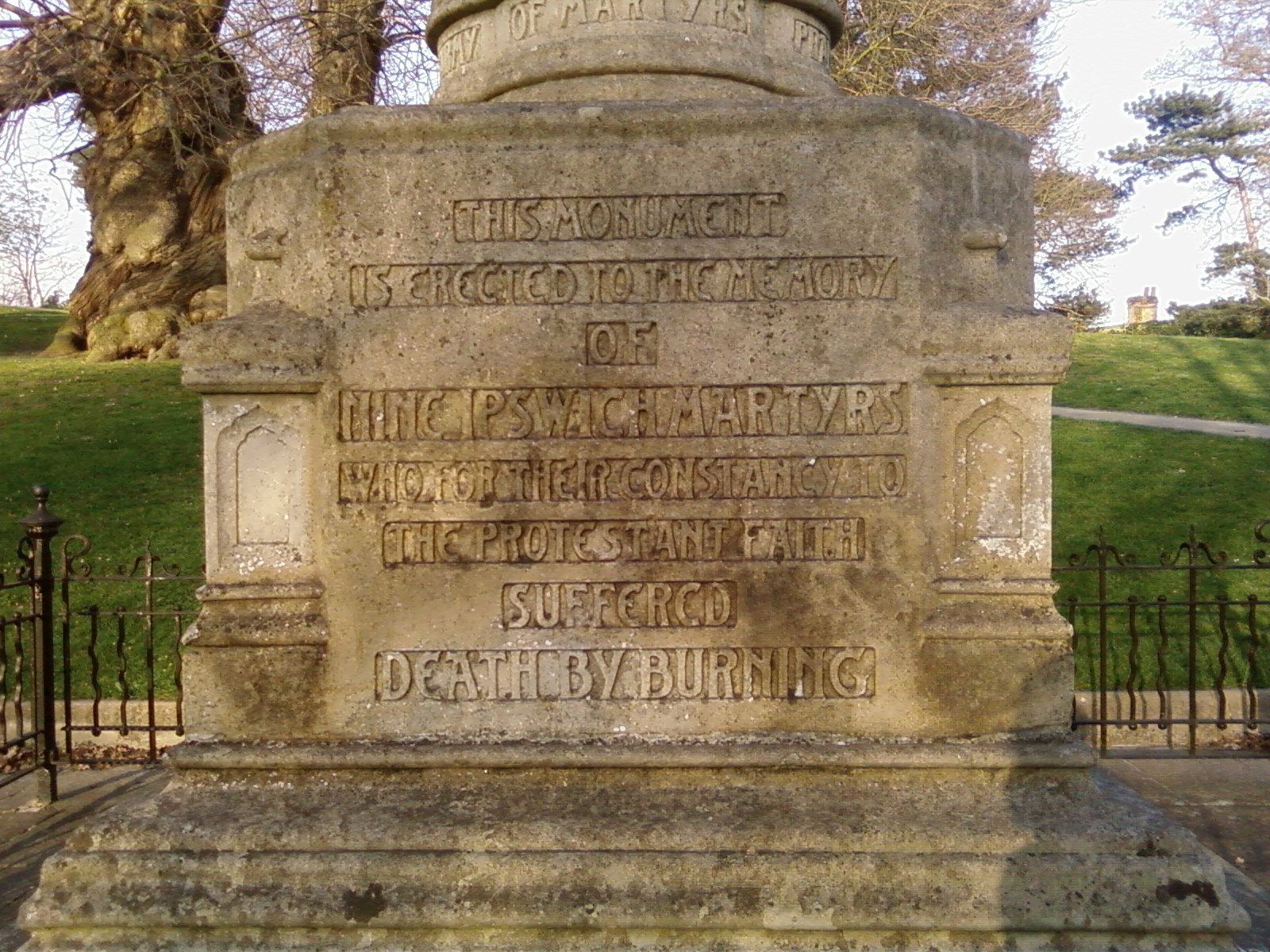
The text at the front of the monument

"This monument is erected to the memory of nine Ipswich martyrs who for their constancy to the Protestant faith suffered death by burning."

"Oh may Thy soldiers, faithful, true and bold,
Fight as the saints who nobly fought of old,
And win with them the victor's crown of gold.
Alleluia."

== See also ==
- List of Protestant martyrs of the English Reformation

== Sources ==
- N. F. Layard, Seventeen Suffolk Martyrs (Smiths, Ipswich 1902)
- Editorial: Ipswich Martyr's Memorial, in The Christian, 24 December 1903.
- Editorial: The Martyrs of Ipswich, in Daily Graphic, 17 December 1903.
