= Alexander Gooch and Alice Driver =

Protesters who were brutally killed in 1558

Alexander Gooch and Alice Driver (both died 4 November 1558) were natives of the area around Woodbridge, Suffolk, England, who were arrested, put to an inquisition and burned at the stake in Ipswich for their adherence to the protestant faith, as part of the Marian persecutions. Both are commemorated among the Ipswich Martyrs.

== Background ==
Alexander Gooch, of Woodbridge, was a weaver who had become a believer in the reformed faith. He refused to admit that the Pope was the supreme head of the Church and refused to receive the Mass. In consequence, he had been obliged to flee from his home in Woodbridge and go into hiding. He was pursued by a Justice named Noone. Alice Driver, born around 1528, was a married woman of Grundisburgh (a village close by Woodbridge) who had grown up as a country girl and had often driven her father's plough before she married Edward Driver of that village. She also came to the attention of Justice Noone, for she had obtained an English Bible and begun to read it. She had come to believe that the Holy Communion as it was administered in the Roman Mass was an idolatrous institution and contrary to the teachings of Christ. Therefore, she had probably ceased to attend church and may have been brought to Noone's attention by the priest of Grundisburgh.

== The arrest ==
Justice Noone went to Grundisburgh with a body of men in search of Alexander Gooch, who was in hiding in Alice Driver's house. Hearing that the justice and his men were coming, Gooch and Driver hid themselves in a haystack, but their pursuers stuck pitchforks into the hay and discovered them. Gooch and Driver were captured and taken to the jail at Melton, a village adjacent to Woodbridge. They remained there for a time, before being taken to Bury St Edmunds to attend the Assizes held at the feast of St James.

== First examination ==
Alice Driver showed herself to be a person of extraordinary courage and forthright speech. She was brought before Sir Clement Heigham, M.P. for Ipswich and Speaker of the House of Commons, who had been concerned also in the burning at Ipswich of Agnes Potten and Joan Trunchfield two years previously. Before him, she compared Queen Mary to Jezebel. Sir Clement immediately ordered that her ears should be cut off in punishment, but even that did not appear to subdue her spirits but rather increased her determination, and she was sent back to Melton Gaol.

== Alice Driver's examination (extract) ==
In Ipswich she was taken to the judgement hall to be examined by Dr Spenser, Chancellor of Norwich. The Inquisition proceeded as follows, when Alice Driver smiled as she was brought in:
Spenser: "Why, woman, dost thou laugh us to scorn?"
Driver: "Whether I do or no, I might well enough, to see what fools ye be."
Spenser: "Wherefore hast thou been laid in prison?"
Driver: "Wherefore? I think I need not tell you, for ye know it better than I."
Spenser (taken aback): "No, by my troth woman, I know not why."
Driver: "Then have ye done much wrong thus to imprison me, and know no cause why; for I know no evil that I have done, I thank God, and I hope there is no man that can accuse me of any notorious fact that I have done, justly."
Spenser: "What sayest thou to the Blessed Sacrament of the altar? Dost thou believe that it is very flesh and blood after the words be spoken of consecration?"
Alice Driver stood with her lips deliberately sealed. A priest who stood by told her, "Answer the Chancellor, woman!"
Driver: "Why, priest, I came not to talk with thee, but I came to talk with thy master, but if thou wilt I shall talk with thee, command thy master to hold his peace." With that the priest put his nose in his cap and spake never a word again. The Chancellor again pressed her for a reply.
Driver: "Sir, pardon me though I make no answer, for I cannot tell what you mean thereby, for in all my life I never heard nor read of any such Sacrament in all the Scripture."
Spenser: "Why, what scriptures have you read?"
Driver: "I have, I thank God, read God's Book... the Old and New testament. That same book have I read throughout, yet never could find any such Sacrament there; and for that cause I cannot make answer to that thing I know not. Notwithstanding for all, I will grant you a Sacrament, called the Lord's Supper, and therefore seeing I have granted you a Sacrament, I pray you show me what a Sacrament is."
Spenser: "It is a sign." Dr Gascoigne, who was standing by, confirmed the same, that it was a sign of a holy thing.
Driver: "You have said the truth, sir, it is a sign indeed, and I must needs grant it; and therefore seeing it is a sign, it cannot be the thing signified also. Thus far we agree, for I have granted you your own saying."

== Alice Driver's last statement ==
Before her condemnation, her final statement was as follows:

Have you any more to say? God be honoured. You be not able to resist the Spirit of God in me, a poor woman. I am an honest poor man's daughter, never brought up in the University, as you have been, but I have driven the plough before my father many a time (I thank God): yet, notwithstanding, in the defence of God's truth, and in the cause of my Master Christ, by His grace I will set my foot against the foot of any of you all, in the maintenance and defence of the same, and if I had a thousand lives, they should go for payment thereof.

== Execution in Ipswich ==
The execution began at 7.00a.m. on 4 November 1558 (a fortnight before the death of Queen Mary on 18 November), when Alexander Gooch and Alice Driver were taken to the Cornhill, Ipswich, where the stake was set up. Many people were assembled, including a considerable number whose sympathies were with the victims, and who supported them with demonstrations of affection and pity. The two knelt on a broom faggot together to say their prayers, and to sing psalms together, until Richard Smart, one of the two Bailiffs of the Borough, roughly told them to "have done". Their request to have more time in which to prepare themselves was refused.

The Sheriff, Sir Henry Dowell, then commanded that they should be tied to the stake. A heavy chain was fastened around Alice Driver's neck, at which she said, "Oh! Here is a goodly neckerchief; blessed be God for it." Then various people came up from the crowd and shook hands with them. This annoyed the Sheriff so much that he ordered them to be arrested, whereupon many others from the crowd ran to the stake to do the same, so that he was obliged to leave them all alone. The broom was then lit, and the execution proceeded.

== Sources ==
- John Foxe, Foxe's Book of Martyrs
- N. F. Layard, Seventeen Suffolk Martyrs (Smiths, Ipswich 1903)
