= The Cornhill, Ipswich =

Town square in Ipswich, England

The Cornhill
- Public square
- {{{other_names}}}
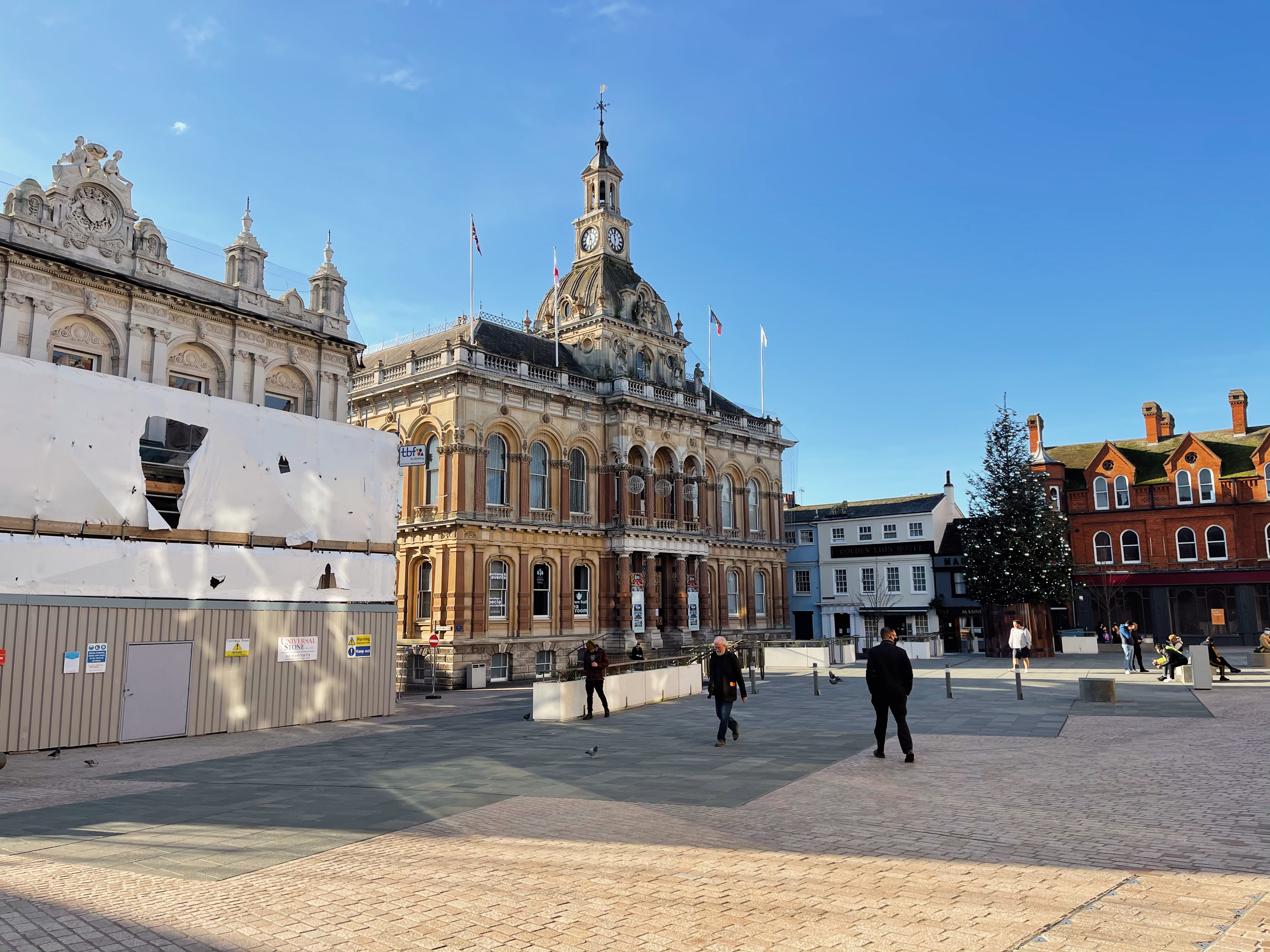
- The town square in 2020
- Surface: Stone & Concrete
- Location: Ipswich, Suffolk
- Interactive map of The Cornhill
- Coordinates: 52°03′28″N 1°09′10″E

The Cornhill in Ipswich is a historic town square in the centre of Ipswich, Suffolk. The square has been a gathering place for many centuries in the town, the earliest recorded event was the execution of the Ipswich Martyrs in the 16th century. In the present-day, the Cornhill hosts various events such as Christmas markets, live music shows, and outdoor screenings of notable broadcasts, such as the proms. The square is surrounded by grand Victorian buildings built as the town's wealth was booming from sheep wool and dock trade. The prominent Ipswich Town Hall building is located on the Cornhill.

== History ==
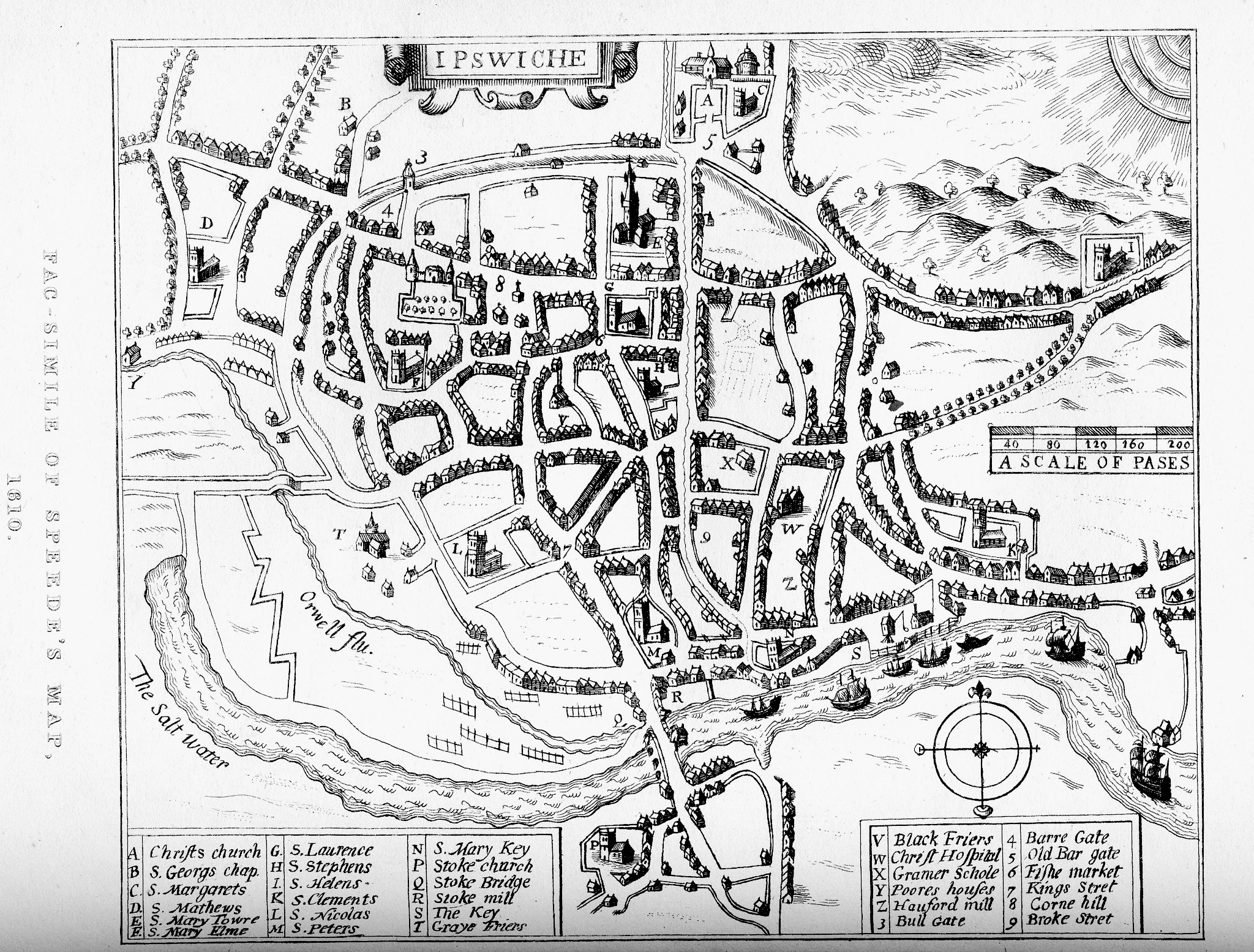
The Cornhill can be seen on Ipswich's earliest map. John Speed's 1610 map labeled the square as number 8 and is referred to as "Corne hill"

The Cornhill has always been an important area throughout the town's history. It was the location of St Mildred's Church which was later used as an administrative centre.

During the religious turmoil of the sixteenth century, the Cornhill was site of the execution of the Ipswich Martyrs, nine people were persecuted for their Lollard or Protestant beliefs around 1515–1558. A memorial for the martyrs was erected in Christchurch Park in 1903. The monument has a square, stone base that bears a testament to the martyrs on the front, and lists their names on the other three sides.

In 1818 William Cubitt connected a gas supply emanating from Ransome and Sons coke plant in Old Foundry Street to Cornhill, thereby introducing gas lighting to the square.

In 1980's the Cornhill was pedestrianised into a town square after being used as a busy road throughout the town for decades.

Cabman's Shelter, created in 1892, was made to provide a dry, warm space for drivers of horse-drawn cabs in the centre of Ipswich. It was moved from the Cornhill, to Christchurch Park in 1895. Damaged by fire in 1995, it was restored in 2006.

== 2018 Redevelopment ==
In 2012, Lord Stuart Rose criticised the town square, describing it as a "barren wasteland" and "the most depressing place I have ever seen". His comments led to a £3.6 million redevelopment of the square, in 2018 work commenced to replace the pavement, add a water fountain feature, and add four stone "gateway" arches. The new square was criticised by locals and a petition against the cost and design was signed by over 4000 people. A few months after the new square was opened, a fatal incident on the square's steps brought many questions about the safety of the new square. The council responded by commissioning remedial work to improve the safety of the squares steps, and by removing the gateway arches which were widely disliked. The redevelopment was completed in 2020, two years after the construction work first commenced.

== Gallery ==
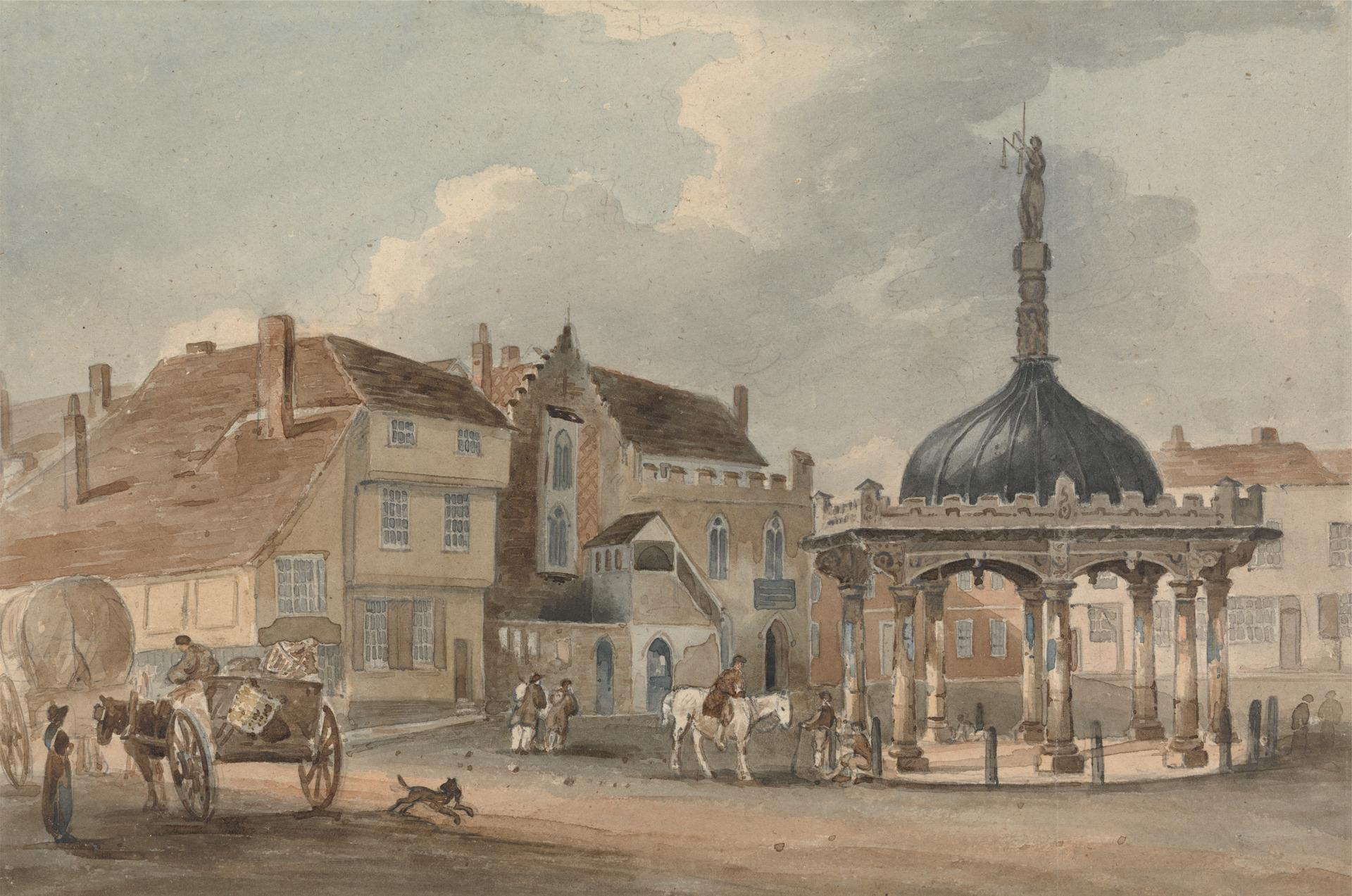
Corn Hill and Moot Hall c1820

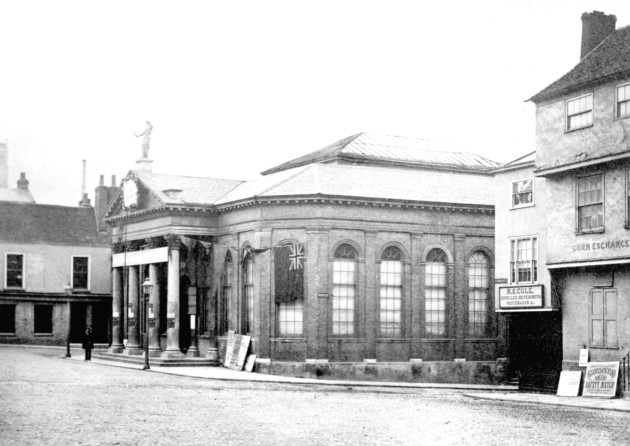
The Cornhill in 1865

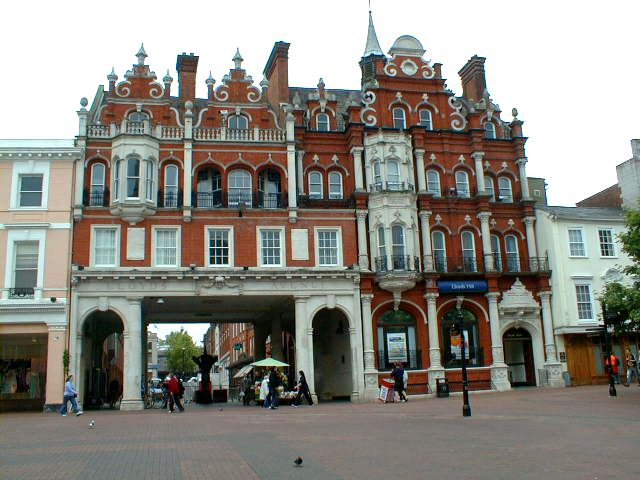
The grand Georgian building housing Lloyds Bank (June 2005)

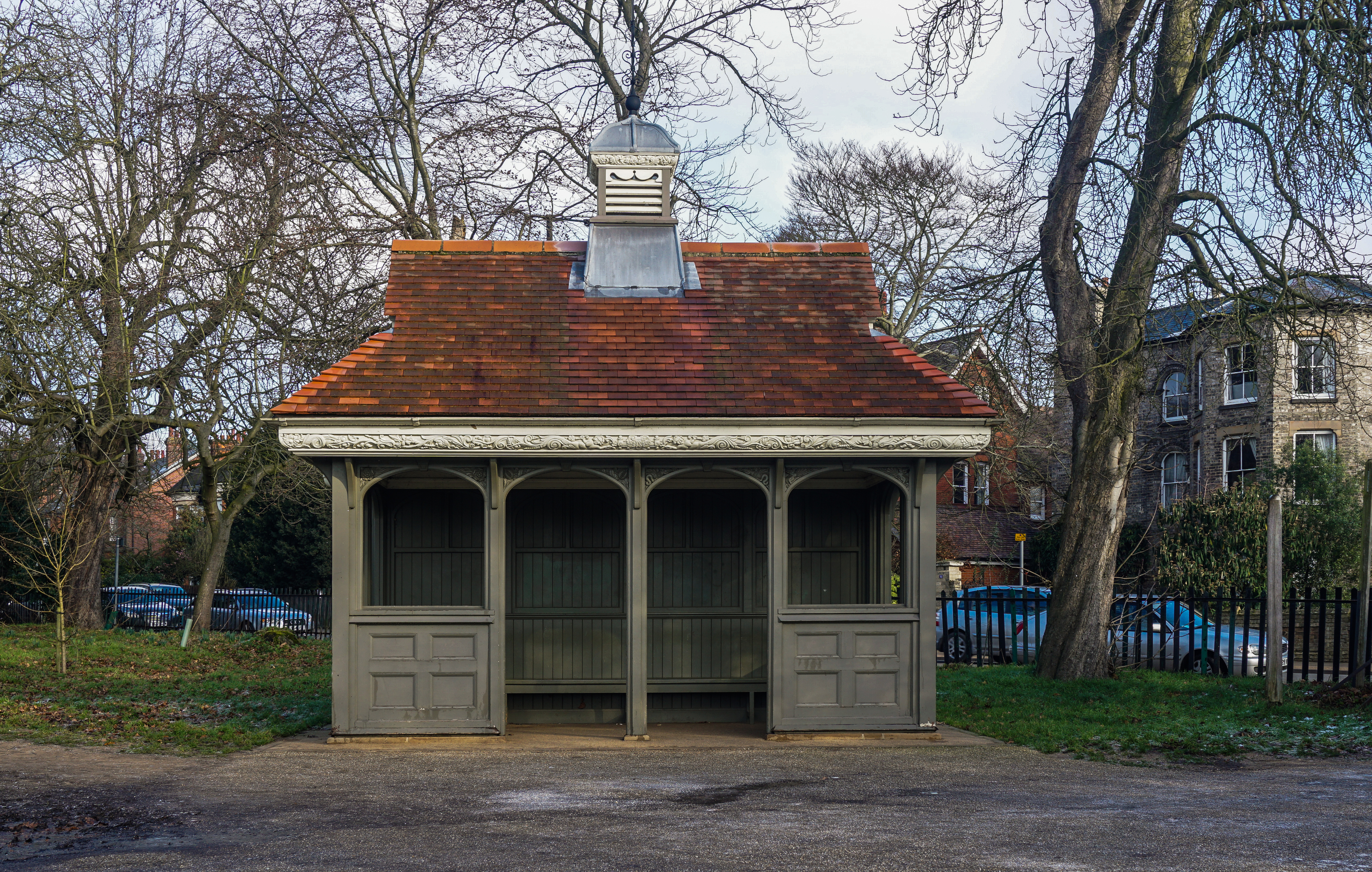
Cabman's Shelter, built for drivers of horse-drawn cabs in the square, now located in Christchurch Park.
