= Burgh, Suffolk =

Village in Suffolk, England

Coordinates: 52.116°N 1.258°E

Burgh
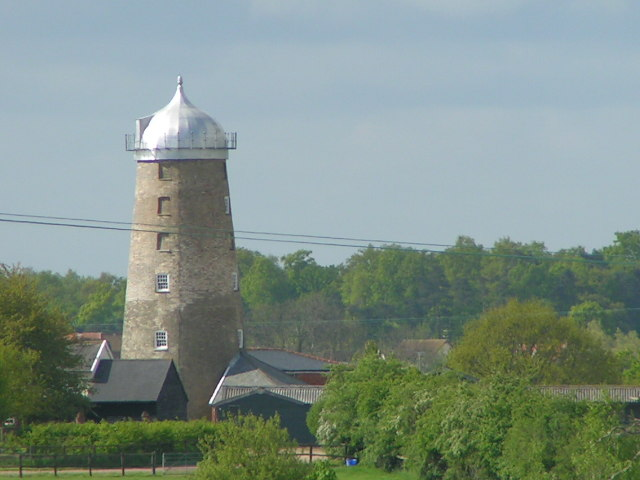
- Burgh Windmill

- Location within Suffolk
- Population: 182 (2011 census)
- District: East Suffolk
- Shire county: Suffolk
- Region: East
- Country: England
- Sovereign state: United Kingdom
- Post town: Woodbridge
- Postcode district: IP13

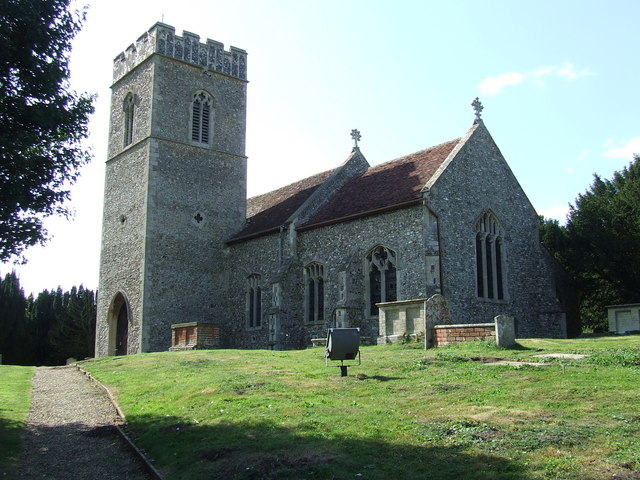
St Botolph's, Burgh

Burgh (/ˈbɜːrɡ/) is a village and civil parish in the East Suffolk district of Suffolk, England, about 3.5 miles (6 km) north-west of Woodbridge.

St Botolph's church stands within a ploughed-flat iron-age enclosure - the "burgh" - near the site of a possible Roman villa that stretches towards Clopton churchyard. The enclosure has been excavated, and found to date between 50 BC to 60 AD. Roman finds were also made, including some military items, and fragments of what may have been a hypocaust.

The body of Saint Botolph (or Botwulf) is supposed to have been buried at his foundation of Icanho (Iken) but in 970, Edgar I of England gave permission for Botolph's remains to be transferred to a place "near Grundisburgh". It is thought that probably Burgh is meant. They remained for some fifty years before being transferred to their own tomb at Bury St Edmunds Abbey, on the instructions of Cnut.

There was a church in the burgh in the middle Saxon period. The present church building dates from the 14th century and is a Grade II* listed building. In the north wall is a mural painting by Anna Zinkeisen in memory of her husband Col. Guy Heseltine of c. 1967 showing birds of the Bible.

The population of Burgh is about 200, measured at 182 at the 2021 census. Because of its small size, there is no parish council, and no parish rate is levied. Instead, there is a parish meeting to which all villagers are invited. This meeting occurs two or three times a year. During these meetings, residents are welcome to discuss the issues, problems, concerns and affairs of the village.

Several artists and craftsmen live and work in the village.

The neighbouring village of Grundisburgh and the towns of Woodbridge and Ipswich provide shops and all business and commercial services.
