= George Somes Layard =

English barrister, journalist

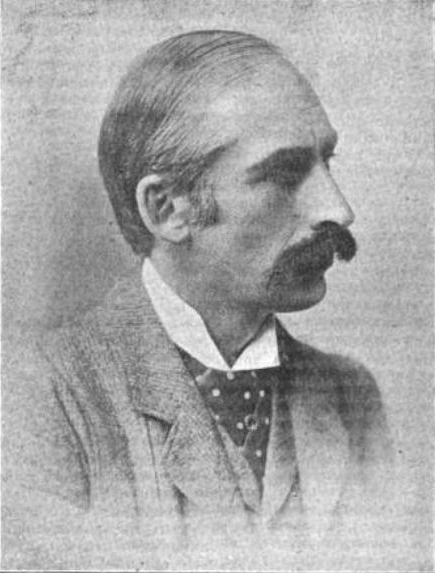
- Born: 1857; Clifton, Bristol
- Died: 1925 (aged 67–68)
- Education: Monkton Combe School; Harrow School; Trinity College, Cambridge
- Occupations: Barrister, journalist and writer
- Spouse: Eleanor Byng Gribble
- Children: John Willoughby Layard

George Somes Layard (1857–1925) was an English barrister, journalist and man of letters.

== Early life ==
He was the third son of Sarah (née Somes) and Charles Clement Layard, rector of Combe Hay in Somerset, born at Clifton, Bristol; Nina Frances Layard was his sister. He was educated at Harrow School and Monkton Combe School.

== Career ==
He matriculated at Trinity College, Cambridge in 1876, graduating BA in 1881. He was called to the bar that year at the Inner Temple, which he had joined in 1877.

== Personal life ==
He married Eleanor Byng Gribble. Their second child was the psychologist John Willoughby Layard.

== Family connections ==
Layard was related to a number of prominent individuals through both his parents. His father was first cousin (on his father's side) of Sir Austen Henry Layard (excavator of Nineveh and Nimrud), Edgar Leopold Layard (Curator of the South African Museum at Cape Town, and Governor of Fiji), and of Lady Charlotte Guest (translator of the Mabinogion and collector of ceramics).

His grandfather Brownlow Villiers Layard was aide-de-camp and afterwards (1802) private chaplain to the Duke of Kent (and brother of the Governors of Malta and Curaçao and of Lady Lindsey), and was the son of a Dean of Bristol and grandson of the accoucheur Daniel Peter Layard. C. C. Layard was also first cousin (on his mother's side) of Lady Llanover (of the Welsh cultural revival), being the son of Louisa Port, sister of Georgiana (favoured grandniece of Mrs Delany and companion of Fanny Burney), and therefore a descendant of Bernard Granville of Calwich and of Sir Richard Grenville of 'The Revenge'.

Layard's mother Sarah Somes was sister of Samuel Somes and the MP, Joseph Somes. In the 1830s her brothers were the largest ship-owners in London and held contracts for convict shipping to Australia. His sister Nina Layard was a poet, prehistorian, archaeologist and antiquarian who conducted important excavations, and one of the first four women to be admitted as Fellow of the Society of Antiquaries of London.

== Selected works ==
- The Life and Letters of Charles Samuel Keene (1892) (See Charles Samuel Keene.)
- Tennyson and his pre-Raphaelite illustrators. A book about a book (1894)
- Portraits of Cruikshank by Himself (1897)
- Mrs. Lynn Linton; her life, letters, and opinions (1901)
- The Life and Work of Kate Greenaway (A. & C. Black, London 1905) with Marion Harry Spielmann (See Kate Greenaway.)
- Sir Thomas Lawrence's Letter-bag (George Allen, London 1906)
- Suppressed plates, wood engravings, &c., together with other curiosities germane thereto; being an account of certain matters peculiarly alluring to the collector (A. & C. Black, London 1907)
- A Great "Punch" Editor: Being the Life, Letters, and Diaries of Shirley Brooks (1907) (See Shirley Brooks.)
- The Headless Horseman: Pierre Lombart's Engraving, Charles or Cromwell? (1922)
- An Amateur Detective (1925)
- Catalogue Raisonné of Engraved British Portraits from altered plates (Philip Allan & Co, London 1927)
