= Robert Samuel =

English protestant martyr

Robert Samuel (died 31 August 1555) was an English priest of East Bergholt in Suffolk, England who was imprisoned, tortured and burnt to death as a judicial execution under the Marian persecutions, and is commemorated as one of the Ipswich Martyrs. His sufferings are recorded in John Foxe's Book of Martyrs.

== The path of persecution ==
Robert Samuel was the minister of the parish church of East Bergholt, in the Stour valley, during the reign of King Edward VI, at which time it was permitted for priests to be married, and he dwelt there together with his wife. Following the accession of Queen Mary I, a strict edict was issued demanding that all married priests should set aside their wives and return to a life of celibacy. Robert Samuel's wife went to live in Ipswich.

As a believer in the reformed faith, however, Samuel attracted the hostility of the virulent anti-reformist, William Foster, from the village of Copdock near Ipswich, a Justice of the Peace, who is described as 'a steward and keeper of the courts.' When, not long before, Dr Rowland Taylor of Hadleigh had found the (Roman) priest John Averth of Aldham, protected by armed guards, actually celebrating the Roman Catholic Mass in Taylor's benefice at Hadleigh, and had protested, it was Foster that had there immediately denounced Taylor as a traitor impeding the Queen's proceedings. Taylor was arrested and after an imprisonment in London and inquisition before the Bishops, was burnt at the stake at Aldham Common in February 1555. After this success Foster turned his attention to Samuel.

== Arrest and imprisonment ==
Samuel was removed from his benefice at Bergholt, but continued secretly to visit the houses of those of his flock who still adhered to the reformed doctrines, so that his influence continued to be felt. Therefore, spies were sent after him, and it was decided to trap him whilst visiting his wife in Ipswich. A large band of assailants surrounded the house at night, seized him and dragged him away from his weeping wife to bear him off to prison. He was first imprisoned in the town gaol, which was then within the West Gate of the town, a medieval gateway within the earthen rampart. While in Ipswich he was succoured by two Ipswich women, Agnes Potten and Joan Trunchfield. John Bird, who had been the Keeper of the gaol since at least 1546, was in around 1556 accused by the Queen's Commissioners of encouraging the Protestants who were sometimes placed in his care. Samuel was in company with other like-minded prisoners, and 'passed his time meekly among his godly brethren, so long as he was permitted to continue there.'

== Letters to the congregation ==
Robert Samuel wrote two letters To the Christian Congregation, exhorting his fellow-sufferers to

be constant in obeying God, rather than men. For, although they slay our sinful bodies for God's verity, yet they cannot do it but by God's sufferance and goodwill, to His praise and honour, and to our eternal joy and felicity. For our blood shed for the Gospel shall preach it with more fruit, and greater furtherance, than did our mouths, lives and writings, as did the blood of Abel, Stephen, with many others more.

== Norwich: inquisition, torture, visions ==
Samuel was next transferred to Norwich, to the prison then within Norwich Castle, for inquisition by the Bishop Dr Hopton, who had 'reclaimed' several heretics. He was subjected to tortures of atrocious cruelty, being "chained bolt upright to a great post, in such sort, that standing only on tip-toe he was fain to stay up the whole poise or weight of his body thereby." At the same time he was fed only two or three mouthfuls of bread daily, and three spoonfuls of water.

Perhaps as a result of this starvation and torment, after two or three days, "he fell into a sleep as it were one-half in a slumber, at which time one clad all in white seemed to stand before him, who ministered comfort to him by these words, 'Samuel, Samuel! be of good cheer, and take a good heart unto thee, for after this day shalt thou never be either hungry or thirsty.' Which thing came to pass accordingly," for he felt neither hunger nor thirst again till he was led away to be burnt. He told his friends that he had received many other such comforts from Christ, but that he would not relate them from modesty. Angels ministered to him, and there was the form of some Other that lightened the gloom of the dungeon.

He related a dream to his friends, which later interpreted as prophetic. He seemed to see three separate ladders set up to heaven, one of them longer than the others, but all at length joining together, and becoming one. On the day after his execution Agnes Potten and Joan Trunchfield, the two Ipswich women who had helped him, were arrested and later burnt.

== Samuel's Confession of Faith ==
Among the various writings left by Samuel is a Confession of Faith which includes a statement as to his opinion of the higher mystical significance of the Holy Communion. Even this, however, was insufficient for the inquisitors who demanded obedience to the doctrine of transsubstantiation:

"As soon as I hear these most comfortable and heavenly words spoken and pronounced by the mouth of the minister, 'This is My Body, which is given for you,' when I hear (I say) this heavenly harmony of God's infallible promises and truth, I look not upon, neither do I behold bread and wine; for I take and believe the words simply and plainly, even as Christ spake them. For hearing these words, my senses be rapt and utterly excluded, for faith wholly taketh place, and not flesh, nor the carnal imaginations of our gross fleshly and unreverent eating, after the manner of our bodily food, which profiteth nothing at all, as Christ witnesseth, but with a sorrowful and wounded conscience, and hungry and thirsty soul, and pure and faithful mind, do fully embrace, behold and feed and look upon, that most glorious body of Christ in Heaven at the right hand of God the Father, very God and very Man, which was crucified and was slain, and His blood shed for our sins, there now making intercession, offering and giving His holy body for me, for my body, for my ransom, for my full price and satisfaction, who is my Christ, and all that ever he hath, and by this spiritual and faithful eating of this lively and heavenly bread I feel the most sweet sap and taste of the fruits, benefits and unspeakable joys of Christ's death and passion, fully digested into my soul.

For my mind is quieted from all worldly adversities, turmoilings, and troubles, my conscience is pacified from sin, death, hell and damnation; my soul is full, and hath even enough, and will no more; for all things are but loss, vile dung and dross, vain vanity, for the excellent knowledge-sake of Christ Jesus, my Lord and Saviour. Thus now is Christ's flesh my very meat indeed, and His blood my very drink indeed, and I am become flesh of His flesh and bone of His bones. Now I live, yet not I, but Christ liveth in me. Yea, I dwell in Him, and He in me, for, through faith in Christ and for Christ's sake, we are one - that is, of one consent, mind, and fellowship with the Father, the Son and the Holy Ghost. Thus am I assured and fully persuaded, and on this rock have I builded, by God's grace, my dwelling and resting-place, for body and soul, life and death. And thus I commit my cause, under Christ, the righteous and just Judge, who will another day judge these debates and controversies, whom I humbly beseech to cast His tender and merciful eyes upon the afflicted and ruinous churches, and shortly to reduce them into a godly and perpetual concord."

== Execution ==
Robert Samuel died by burning at the stake as a judicial execution, in public in Ipswich on 31 August 1555. This was probably on the Corn Hill at the town centre, though the fact is not certainly recorded. It was reported that he was tied to a pole and forced to stand on tip-toe for several days before finally set ablaze. Those who attended the execution stated that it appeared to them that his burning body shone 'bright and white as new-tried silver.' The two women who had helped him were arrested on 1 September and imprisoned until their burning in Ipswich on 19 February 1556.

== Sources ==
- John Foxe, Booke of Martyrs.
- N. F. Layard, Seventeen Suffolk Martyrs (Smiths, Ipswich 1903).
