= John Layard =

English anthropologist and psychologist (1891–1974)

John Willoughby Layard (27 November 1891 – 26 November 1974) was an English anthropologist and psychologist.

== Early life ==
Layard was born in London, son of the essayist and literary writer George Somes Layard and his wife Eleanor. He grew up first at Malvern, and in c. 1902 moved to Bull's Cliff, Felixstowe. He was educated at Bedales School.

In Suffolk Layard came under the influence of his aunt, the poet and archaeologist Nina Frances Layard, who had become established in Ipswich in 1889. With his mother Eleanor he occasionally assisted Nina Layard in her searches for palaeoliths in the Ipswich area, and through her was introduced to Professor A. C. Haddon of Cambridge. She also had direct contacts with Professors William Ridgeway and McKenny Hughes, and with Wynfrid Laurence Henry Duckworth. Her companion, Mary Outram (granddaughter of Sir James Outram), was a cousin of Baron Anatole von Hügel, who was then setting up the University of Cambridge Museum of Archaeology and Anthropology at the Downing Street site, to which John later contributed largely. John studied in Germany in around 1909–10, and was provided by his aunt with an introduction to Dr Leopold Pfeiffer, the Imperial Surgeon, who had written a work of palaeoethnography and greeted him warmly in homage to Nina's work and hospitality.

== University, and the New Hebrides ==
John attended King's College, Cambridge, and gained a degree in modern languages, but through his contacts became interested in anthropology.

In 1914, he accompanied W. H. R. Rivers, one of the leading anthropologists of the day, on an expedition to the New Hebrides (what is today Vanuatu). Layard travelled with his mentor Rivers. They were accompanied by Professor A. C. Haddon and his students, A. R. Radcliffe-Brown and Bronisław Malinowski. Layard and Rivers travelled through the New Hebrides before stopping at Atchin, a small islet off the northeastern shore of Malekula.

The indigenous inhabitants gave them a rather cold reception at first, and Rivers decided to continue travelling while Layard stayed for a year immersing himself in the culture, learning and documenting the vernacular language, and recording myths, legends and oral history. This was a society in which monoliths and standing stones formed part of the cultural material, and Layard's interest clearly had some roots in his aunt's investigations. Prior to this time, anthropologists tended to survey many cultures over the course of expeditions and did not spend long periods of time staying in one place and learning about a single culture. Layard in Atchin and his contemporary Bronisław Malinowski in the Trobriand Islands of New Guinea were the first modern anthropologists to use what is today called participant observation methods in ethnographic research.

== Introduction to psychotherapy ==
John's brother Peter Clement Layard served in France and was killed in 1918. On his return to England, John was mentally exhausted and underwent several attempts to alleviate his troubles through psychotherapy. These were unfortunate in various ways. His first analyst, Homer Lane, was arrested for having a relationship with a female patient. Subsequent work (which served also as a training for Layard in his own exploration of his psyche, and his attempts to make sense of his experiences) took place in England, in Vienna (in 1926), and then in Berlin, where he joined the circle of David Ayerst and his English literary friends.

Layard, however, reached a new crisis, and he returned to England, to Oxford, where he joined the circle of Mansfield Forbes.

== Stone Men of Malekula ==
Layard returned to anthropology, producing in 1942 his magnum opus, Stone Men of Malekula. This was originally planned to be the first of three volumes on the "small islands of Malekula" (Vao, Atchin and Rano). Instead the book is the only monographic treatment of Layard's New Hebridean materials, although he continued to analyse and write about them in numerous publications in psychoanalytic journals.

Layard sent many artefacts from Vanuatu to the Museum of Archaeology and Anthropology in Cambridge, and sent others, including a penis-gourd, to his aunt Nina, who presented them to the Ipswich Museum, where they may still be seen. More than 400 glass-plate negatives of photographs taken by Layard are also held by the Museum of Archaeology and Anthropology in Cambridge.

== Depression, and work with Jung ==
Layard suffered from depression during large periods of his life. In 1929 while living in Berlin, he attempted suicide by shooting himself in the head, most likely due to his unrequited love for W.H. Auden. He took a taxi to Auden's apartment and asked him to "finish the job". Auden refused, and instead took Layard to hospital. By extraordinary good fortune he survived. He was later treated by Carl Gustav Jung in Zurich in the mid-1940s.

As well as undergoing analysis, he began to study and work with Jung. This influenced his later work as a practising psychoanalyst when he adopted Jungian (rather than Freudian) theories of mind and of the unconscious.

== Dream analysis and archetypes ==
In 1944 Layard published a work of dream-analysis, The Lady of the Hare. The first half of the book is based on sessions of analytical therapy conducted with an English family in 1940. By his account, the therapy was successful in settling the disturbed relationships within the family. The second half of the book explores the images derived from the dream-work in explicitly Jungian terms, discussing "archetypes", and dealing in particular with the theme of hare and rabbit sacrifice, and its significance in various cultures and mythologies.

== Personal life ==
In the 1920s, Layard moved in expatriate gay circles in Berlin. He became a mentor to W.H. Auden and Christopher Isherwood.

Whilst in Oxford Layard met Doris, then the wife of the anthropologist and psychic investigator Eric Dingwall (c. 1891–1986). John and Doris were later married. They had one son, Richard Layard.

John Layard died in Oxford on 26 November 1974.

== Sources ==
- G.S. Layard, Peter Clement Layard (London, John Murray 1919).
- J. Layard, Stone Men of Malekula: Vao (Chatto and Windus, London 1942).
- J. Layard, The Lady of the Hare, A Study in the Healing Power of Dreams (Faber and Faber, London 1944).
- J. Layard, Celtic Quest: Sexuality and Soul in Individuation. Revised Edn. (Spring Publications, 1985). Published posthumously under separate editorship.
- S.J. Plunkett, 'Nina Frances Layard, Prehistorian (1853–1935)', in W. Davies and R. Charles (Eds), Dorothy Garrod and the Progress of the Palaeolithic (Oxbow 1999, 242–262)
- Haidy Geismar and Anita Herle: Moving images. John Layard, fieldwork and photography on Malakula since 1914, Crawford House Publishing Australia, Adelaide, South Australia 2010 ISBN 978-1-86333-319-1

in bislama language
John Layard long Malakula 1914–1915, 2009. Cambridge University Museum of Archaeology and Anthropology
