= Charles Keene (artist) =

English artist and illustrator (1823–1891)

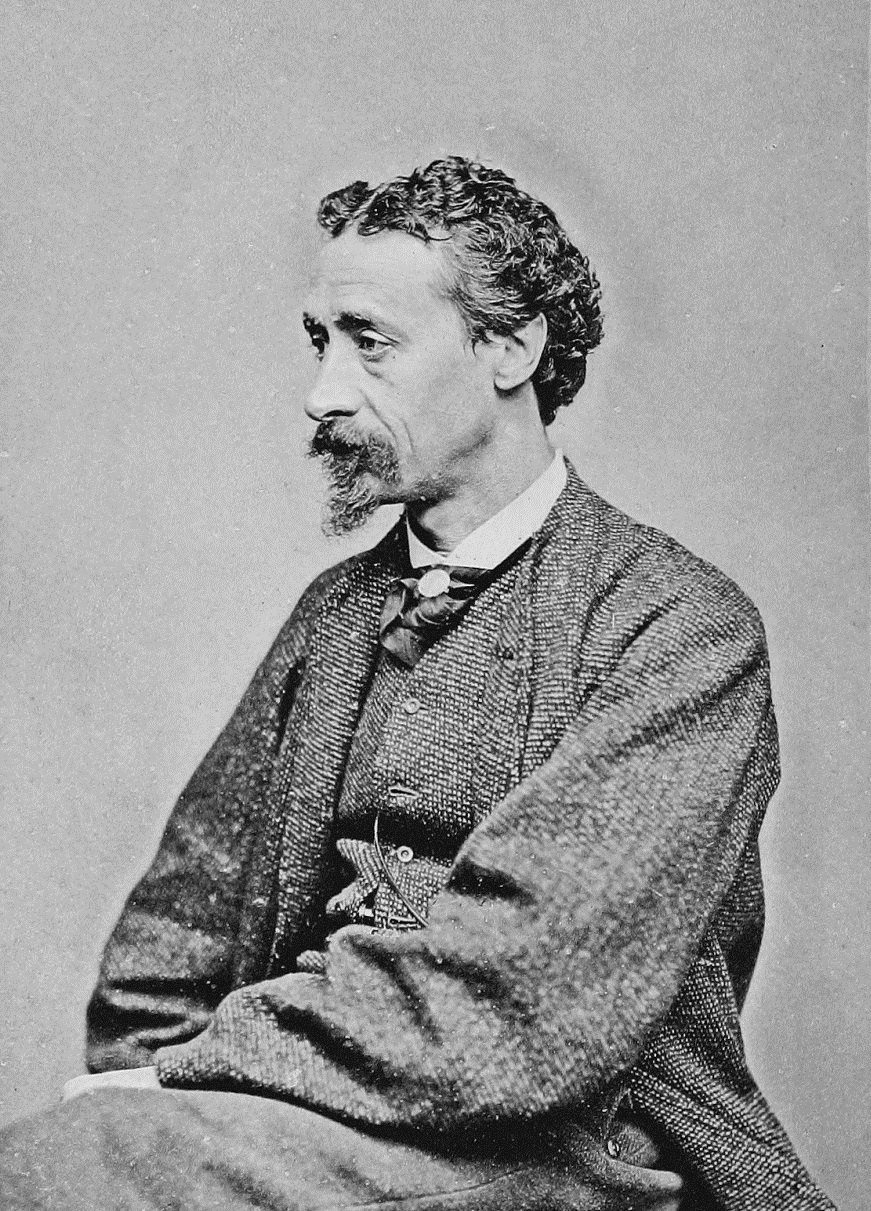
- Charles Keene, by Elliott & Fry.
- Born: Charles Samuel Keene; 10 August 1823; Hornsey
- Died: 4 January 1891 (aged 67); London
- Known for: Painting, illustrations

Charles Samuel Keene (10 August 1823 – 4 January 1891) was an English artist and illustrator, who worked in black and white.

== Early life ==
The son of Samuel Browne Keene, a solicitor, he was born at Hornsey. Educated at the Ipswich School until his sixteenth year, he early showed artistic leanings. Two years after the death of his father he was articled to a London solicitor, but, the occupation proving uncongenial, he was removed to the office of an architect, Mr Pukington. His spare time was now spent in drawing historical and nautical subjects in watercolor. For these trifles his mother, to whose energy and common sense he was greatly indebted, soon found a purchaser, through whom he was brought to the notice of the Whympers, the wood-engravers. This led to his being bound to them as apprentice for five years.

His earliest known design is the frontispiece, signed Chas. Keene, to The Adventures of Dick Boldhero in Search of his Uncle, &c. (Darton & Co., 1842). His term of apprenticeship over, he hired as studio an attic in the block of buildings standing, up to 1900, between the Strand and Holywell Street, and was soon hard at work for the Illustrated London News. At this time he was a member of the Artists Society in Clipstone Street, afterwards removed to the Langham studios.

== Rise ==
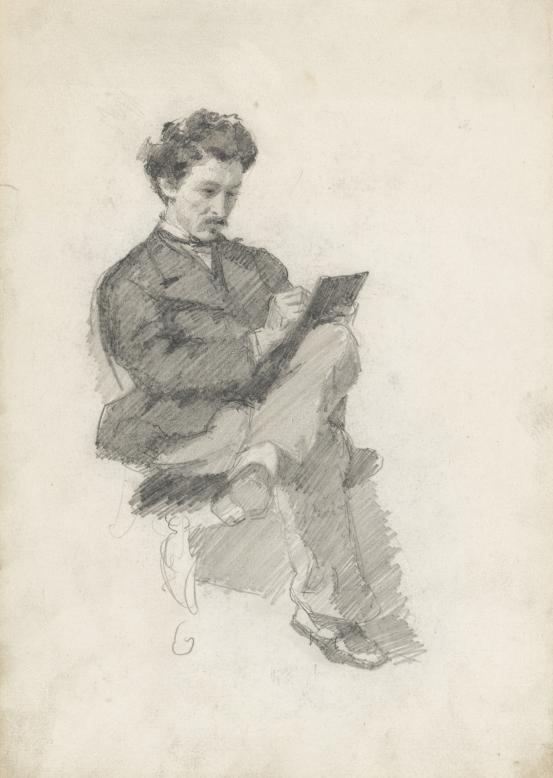
Drawing of Keene, by James McNeill Whistler.

In December 1851 he made his first appearance in Punch and, after nine years of steady work, was called to a seat at the famous table. It was during this period of probation that he first gave evidence of those transcendent qualities which make his work at once the joy and despair of his brother craftsmen. On the starting of Once a Week, in 1859, Keene's services were requisitioned, his most notable series in this periodical being the illustrations to "Charles Reade's A Good Fight" (afterwards rechristened "The Cloister and the Hearth") and to George Meredith's "Evan Harrington". There is a quality of conventionality in the earlier of these which completely disappears in the later.

In 1858, Keene, who was endowed with a fine voice and was an enthusiastic admirer of old-fashioned music, joined the Jermyn Band, afterwards better known as the Moray Minstrels. He was also for many years a member of Leslie's Choir, the Sacred Harmonic Society, the Catch, Glee and Canon Club, and the Bach Choir. He was also an industrious performer on the bagpipes, of which instrument he brought together a considerable collection of specimens.

About 1863 the Arts Club in Hanover Square was started, with Keene as one of the original members. In 1864 John Leech died, and Keene's work in Punch thenceforward found wider opportunities. It was about this time that the greatest of all modern artists of his class, Menzel, discovered Keene's existence, and became a subscriber to Punch solely for the sake of enjoying week by week the work of his brother craftsman. In 1872, Keene, who, though fully possessed of the humorous sense, was not within measurable distance of Leech as a jester, and whose drawings were consequently not sufficiently funny to appeal to the laughter-loving public, was fortunate enough to make the acquaintance of Joseph Crawhall, who had been in the habit for many years of jotting down any humorous incidents he might hear of or observe, illustrating them at leisure for his own amusement. These were placed unreservedly at Keene's disposal, and to their inspiration we owe at least 250 of his most successful drawings in the last twenty years of his connection with Punch. A list of more than 200 of these subjects is given at the end of The Life and Letters of Charles Keene.

== Later years ==
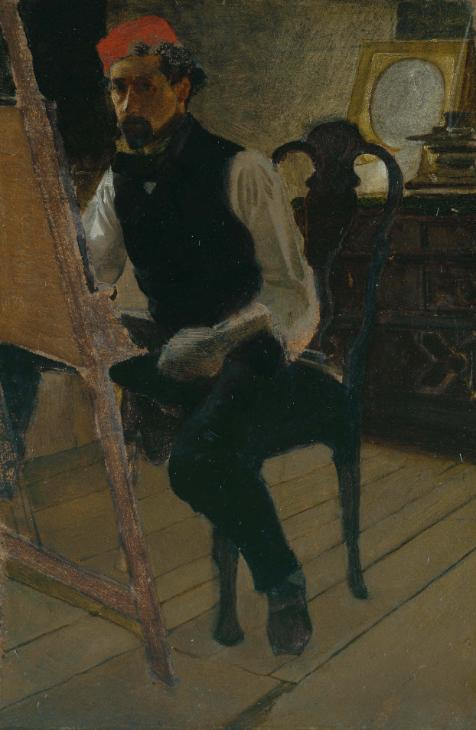
Self-Portrait

In 1879 Keene switched residence to 239 Kings Road, Chelsea, which he occupied until his death walking daily to and from his house, 112 Hammersmith Road. In 1881 a volume of his Punch drawings was published by Messrs Bradbury & Agnew, with the title Our People. In 1883, Keene, who had previously been a strong man, developed symptoms of dyspepsia and rheumatism. By 1889 these had increased to an alarming degree, and he courageously for the last two years of his life bore the pain from his illness. He died unmarried, after a singularly uneventful life, and his body lies in Hammersmith cemetery.

== Critical overview ==
According to Layard in the Encyclopædia Britannica Eleventh Edition, "Keene, who never had any regular art training, was essentially an artist's artist. He held the foremost place amongst English craftsmen in black and white, though his work has never been appreciated at its real value by the general public. No doubt the main reason for this lack of public recognition was his unconventionality. He drew his models exactly as he saw them, not as he knew the world wanted to see them. He found enough beauty and romance in all that was around him, and, in his Punch work, enough subtle humour in nature seized at her most humorous moments to satisfy him. He never required his models to grin through a horse collar, as James Gillray did, or to put on their company manners, as was George du Maurier's wont. But Keene was not only a brilliant worker in pen and ink. As an etcher he has also to be reckoned with, notwithstanding the fact that his plates numbered not more than fifty at the outside. Impressions of them are exceedingly rare, and hardly half a dozen of the plates were known to be in existence [as of 1911]. He himself regarded them only as experiments in a difficult but fascinating medium. But in the opinion of the expert they suffice to place him among the best etchers of the 19th century. Apart from the etched frontispieces to some of the Punch pocket-books, only three, and these by no means the best, have been published. Writing in L'Artiste of a few which he had seen, Félix Bracquemond said: 'By the freedom, the largeness of their drawing and execution, these plates must be classed amongst modern etchings of the first rank.' A few impressions are in the British Museum, but in the main they were given away to friends and lie hidden in the albums of the collector."

The painter Walter Sickert cites Keene often in his book A Free House! or the Artist as Craftsman edited by Osbert Sitwell. Sickert describes the drawings of Keene as having an authenticity about them because he draws from life as a direct observer and avoids the usual cliches that were common in his day. Sickert urges the use of "sight size" drawing from life, by which he means to draw a 6-foot man from 8 feet away so the size of the figure can be seen as a whole and brought to the page as if one was drawing on a pane of glass while looking at the subject. "And so, from the incised designs on bones scratched by primeval man, to the drawings of Charles Keene, has line been the language of design... Line supposes an unbroken thought, a sentence said in a breath. Line supposes that the hand is not taken off the paper."
