= Clopton, Suffolk =

Village in Suffolk, England

Coordinates: 52.117°N 1.25°E

Clopton
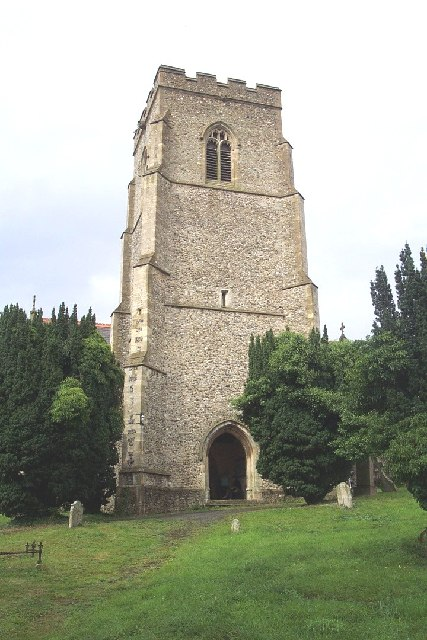
- Tower of St Mary's Church, Clopton

- Location within Suffolk
- Population: 375 (2011 Census)
- Civil parish: Clopton
- District: East Suffolk
- Shire county: Suffolk
- Region: East
- Country: England
- Sovereign state: United Kingdom
- Post town: Woodbridge
- Postcode district: IP13
- UK Parliament: Central Suffolk and North Ipswich

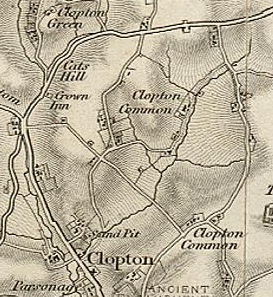
Historical map showing Clopton and surrounding areas.

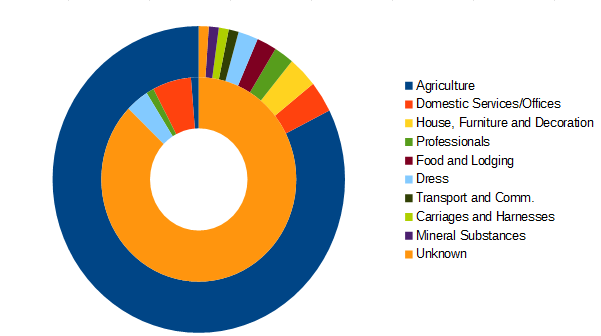
Chart of recorded occupations in Clopton in 1881. The outer ring represents men and the inner women.

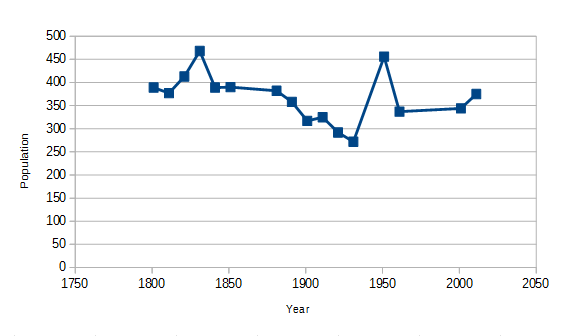
Graph of Clopton's population from 1801 to 2011, from available census records.

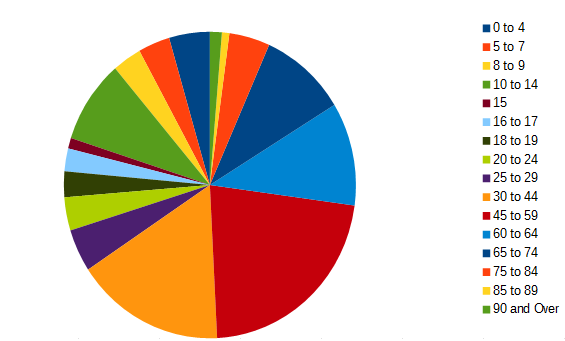
Chart of Clopton's population structure, using data from the 2011 Census.

Clopton is a village and civil parish in Suffolk. It is located between Ipswich and Debenham two kilometres north of Grundisburgh on the River Lark. The village is no larger than a series of houses either side of the B1078, surrounded by farm land. The village itself has no clear centre; houses and other buildings are concentrated around the four manors of Kingshall, Brendhall, Rousehall and Wascolies, all of which are mentioned in the Domesday Book of 1086.

As of 2011, the population of the parish numbered 375 people. The village previously had a school, which was built in 1875 and had capacity for 100 pupils with an average attendance of 56, however it closed in the late 1930s. Pupils instead attend schools in Grundisburgh or Woodbridge, with a bus service provided by Suffolk County Council.

== History ==
=== Historical Writings ===
The earliest known mention of Clopton is a record in the Domesday Book as "Clopetuna".

In the early 1870s, it was described in John Marius Wilson's Imperial Gazetteer of England and Wales as:

"...a parish in Woodbridge district, Suffolk; 3½ miles N by W of Bealings r. station, and 4 NW of Woodbridge. Post town, Grundisburgh, under Wood-bridge. Acres, 2, 074. Real property, £4, 012. Pop., 407. Houses, 84. The property is divided among a few. Part of the land is common. The living is a rectory in the diocese of Norwich. Value, £720.* Patron, Mrs. E. Taylor. The church is old but good; and there are charities £34."

In 1887, John Bartholomew also wrote an entry on Clopton in the Gazetteer of the British Isles with a much shorter description:

"Clopton, par., E. Suffolk, 4 miles NW. of Woodbridge, 2074 ac., pop. 382; P.O.; contains C. Hall."

The BBC Domesday Project described Clopton in a similar yet more detailed fashion to the Gazetteer entries in 1986:

"Clopton is a small village situated approximately 7 miles from Ipswich and 4 miles from Woodbridge in the county of Suffolk. The area consists mainly of arable farms together with a small amount of housing. To the east side of Clopton is an area of disused airfield which now has a small amount of light industry. To the west side is the East Suffolk College of Agriculture and Horticulture at Otley; again consisting mainly of farmland. The village is served by a Post Office, bus service, mobile tradesmen and has 3 churches. There are no schools or shops in Clopton."

=== World War II ===
Between Clopton and the nearby village of Debach, the site of RAF Debach can be found, which was home to the USAAF 493d Bombardment Group over the course of World War II. A service memorial and the flag flown over the base can be found inside St. Mary's church at Clopton.

=== Industry ===
In 1831, the decennial census found that over three-quarters of Clopton's population worked in agriculture, with most of these being labourers employed by farmers. Other than this, the parish had a small number describing themselves as being employed in "retail and handicrafts," and an even smaller number being "professionals" or "other."

In 1844, White's Directories for Suffolk listed 13 farmers, a shoemaker, blacksmith and wheelwright. The 1912 edition listed 19 farmers, a farm bailiff, postmaster, schoolmaster, builder, shoemaker, wheelwright, storekeeper, grocer, hardware merchant, furniture remover/carrier, publican and insurance agent.

By 1881, the Parish as a whole, while still mostly reliant on agriculture to provide work, had diversified into other industries. Around this time, the presence of women in the workplace had increased somewhat as well: though these industries were small in comparison to the almost entirely male-dominated agricultural sector, in the 1881 census women outnumbered men in the 'Domestic Services and Offices' and 'Dress' occupation orders. Nonetheless, while 75 men reported working in agriculture, only 9 women reported having an occupation at all.

=== Population ===
Since the passing of the Census Act 1800, Clopton's overall population has remained relatively unchanged. In 1801, the first decennial census recorded a population of 389 people, while an all-time high of 468 was recorded in 1831.

== The Modern Parish ==
The modern village of Clopton has been described as:

"...a widely spaced village which consists mainly of farming, around 140 residential homes and a few small businesses. There is a very good village hall at the centre of the village, which gets plenty of bookings... but, unfortunately, no village pub, nor shop. However, there are several of each in the nearby surrounding villages."

=== Demographics ===
In 2011, the National Census found that 385 people lived in Clopton, and of these 186 were male and 189 female. The average age of people in Clopton is 41 years, though the largest age group is 45–59 years, with 83 people (22.1% of the total population) reported.

=== Employment ===
People in Clopton reported in the 2011 Census that they were primarily in full-time employment or self-employed (28.8% and 22.9% of the population, respectively), with a smaller percentage being in part-time employment (15.5%). Men make up more of these figures than women: While 35.7% and 32.9% of men are in full-time employment and self-employed respectively, these figures are only 21.4% and 12.2% for women.

The principle sectors of employment for men, as found by the 2011 Census, are in "Skilled Trades Occupations" (25%), "Managers, Directors and Senior Officials" (23.1%) and "Professional Occupations" (21.3%). For women, the main sectors are "Professional Occupations" (20%), "Managers, Directors and Senior Officials" (17.6%) and "Administrative and Secretarial Occupations" (17.6%), with an additional notable presence in "Caring, Leisure and Other Service Occupations" (14.1%).

=== Local Politics ===
Clopton has joined a campaign dubbed "Save Our Rural Roads", first started in 1997 by Grundisburgh & Culpho Parish Council, after concerns of heavy goods vehicles causing damage to buildings and roads in the community.

Residents of the village receive a quarterly news magazine from Grundisburgh and District News.
