= Mary Lakeland =

Mary Lakeland also known as Mother Lakeland and the “Ipswich Witch” (d. 9 September 1645), was an English woman executed for witchcraft in Ipswich. She was one of the few people in England to have been executed by burning after a conviction of witchcraft. She was the last person executed for witchcraft in the town of Ipswich.

Mary Lakeland was the widow of the barber John Lakeland. She confessed to have made a devil's pact, to have employed familiars, imps, who sucked the blood from an injury on her hand created by the Devil, and who had injured and killed people on her orders. She confessed to sending a familiar to torment and kill Mrs. Jenings, after she refused to lend Lakeland a pin; to sending one of her familiars that appeared in the shape of a dog to torment Mr. Lawrence and his child; She confessed to having killed her late spouse by use of witchcraft.

Mary Lakeland was executed by being burned alive at the stake. However, she was not given this method of execution because she was convicted of witchcraft. Normally, peopled sentenced for witchcraft in England were executed by hanging. However, women sentenced for murdering their husbands were judged for petty treason, and the execution method for petty treason was burning at the stake. Since Mary Lakeland was judged for having murdered her husband by use of witchcraft, she was executed by burning, since that was the punishment for petty treason. The same method of execution was used for a few other witchcraft cases, such as that of Margaret Read of King's Lynn in 1590 and Mary Oliver of Norwich in 1659, for the same reason.

Her case was the subject of a contemporary pamphlet treatise, The Laws Against Witches and Conjuration. London: 1645, 8.
