= St George's Chapel, Ipswich =

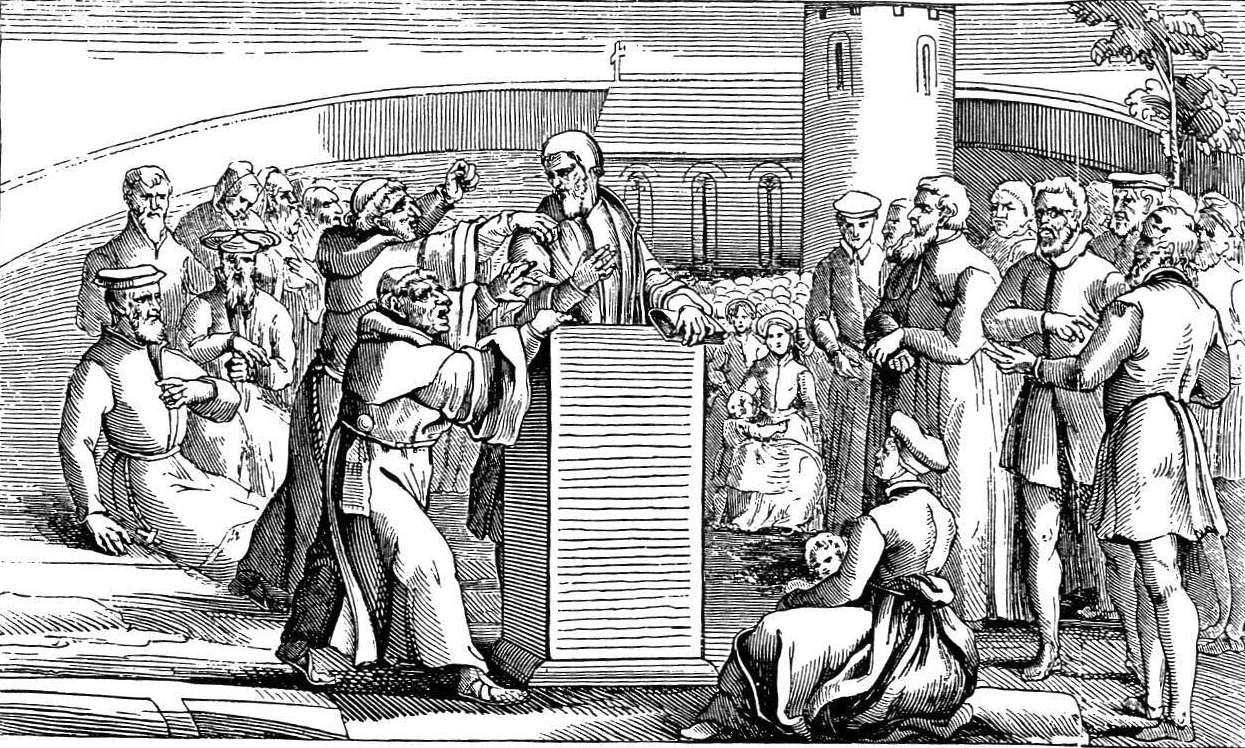
Bilney being molested while preaching at St George's Chapel, from Foxe's Book of Martyrs

St George's Chapel, was a religious building located in Ipswich, Suffolk, England. The spot where it was located is now occupied by St George's Terrace, in St Georges Street. This lies just to the north of the historic town centre of Ipswich. It was from this chapel that Thomas Bilney was taken in 1527 and accused of heresy. No trace of the building remains.

The chapel pre-dates the Norman conquest.

The building had a round tower and is featured in John Speed's map of Ipswich (1610) with a plan in John Ogilby's map of Ipswich of 1674. There is also an illustration of the unfortunate Bilney in Foxe's Book of Martyrs.
