= Grundisburgh =

Village in Suffolk, England

Coordinates: 52.11241°N 1.2462°E

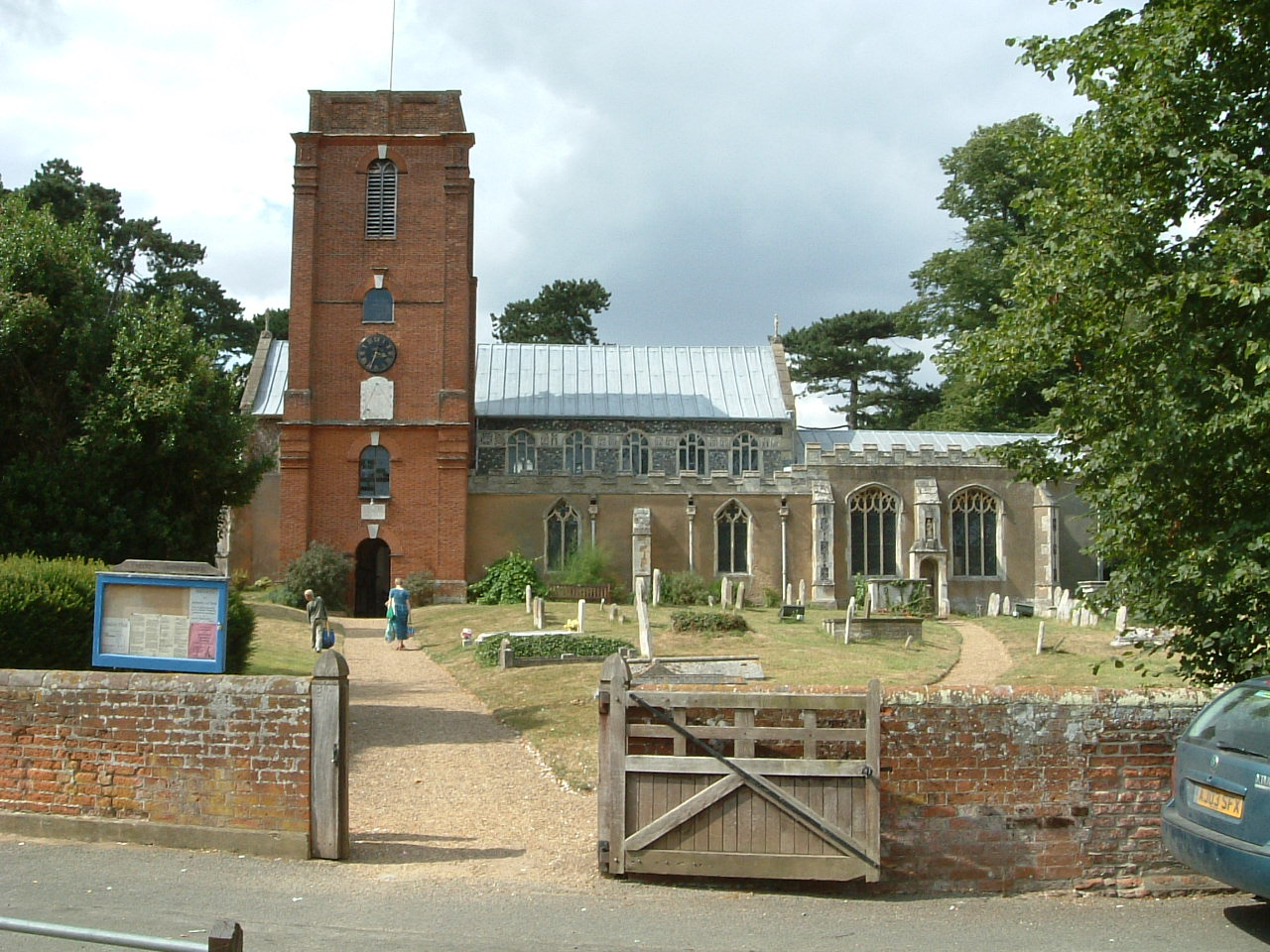
- St Mary's Church, Grundisburgh

- Location within Suffolk
- Population: 1,584 (2011)
- OS grid reference: TM223509
- District: East Suffolk
- Shire county: Suffolk
- Region: East
- Country: England
- Sovereign state: United Kingdom
- Post town: WOODBRIDGE
- Postcode district: IP13
- Dialling code: 01473
- Police: Suffolk
- Fire: Suffolk
- Ambulance: East of England
- UK Parliament: Central Suffolk and North Ipswich

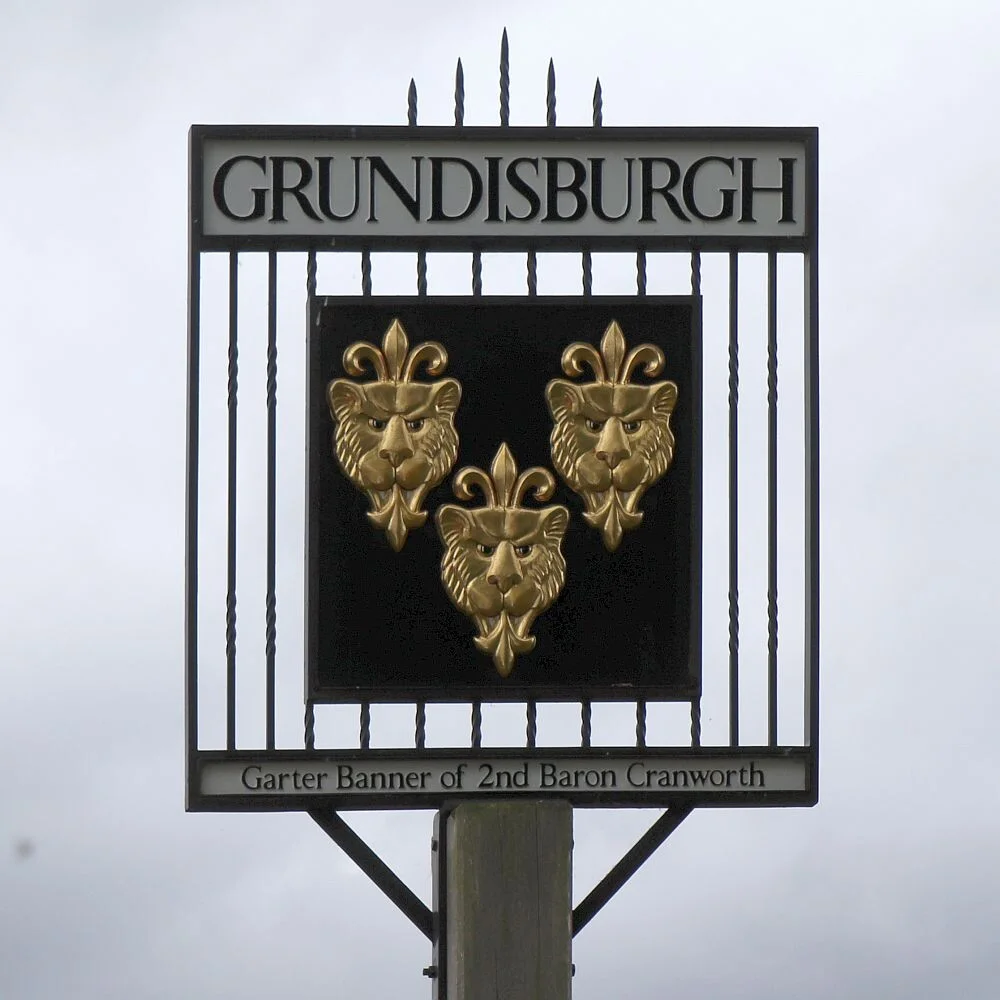
Grundisburgh’s imposing village sign with the arms of Bertram Gurdon, 2nd Baron Cranworth

Grundisburgh (/ˈɡrʌnzˌbrə/) is a village of 1,584 residents situated in the English county of Suffolk. It is in the East Suffolk district, six 6 miles (10 km) north-east from Ipswich and 4 miles (6 km) north-west of Woodbridge located on the B1079. Flowing through the village are the rivers Lark and Gull. The finding of Ipswich and Thetford-type pottery suggests that there was settlement in the Middle Saxon era. The village is recorded in the Domesday Book of 1086 as "Grundesbur", "Grundesburg", "Grundesburh" or "Grundesburc".

The village has a primary school, a Church of England parish church and a Baptist chapel as well as one pub, The Dog. The Grundisburgh and District News is a newspaper which is published by volunteers every three months and provides news for Grundisburgh and the surrounding villages and hamlets. There are two fords in the village. The village is the setting for the novel A Wicked Deed by Susanna Gregory.

Grundisburgh Primary School is a medium-sized school with 131 pupils at the time of the last Ofsted inspection. It is located in a modern building in Alice Driver Road which was built in 1989 after spending 115 years at the Old School next to St Mary's Church. The Old School building has now been converted into affordable housing, which was opened by John Gummer MP in July 1994.

== Meaning ==
The name "Grundisburgh" is an Old English formation, referring to a burh or fortified place. The Burh in this case is an Iron Age fort with the remains of a rectangular Roman fort enclosure surrounding the church of St Botolph at the adjacent village of Burgh, which stands on an acclivity (hill) overlooking the valley in which Grundisburgh lies. Eilert Ekwall considered that "Grund" was probably the former name of the place, derived from the Old English word grund meaning foundation, referring to the footings of the Roman walls. Grundisburgh would then mean "the Burgh at Grund". Alternatively grund might simply mean land, or the lower-lying ground, giving the sense of "Burgh-in-the-valley", i.e. "that part of (the settlement of) Burgh which is in the valley bottom". One further possibility, considered less likely, is that Grund was a personal name and appears in the possessive form, signifying Grund's Burgh. A further useful description of the history of the area is recounted by the Suffolk historian Norman Scarfe.

== Governance ==
An electoral ward of the same name stretches south to Kesgrave with a total population of 2,306.

== Notable natives and residents ==
- Bartholomew Gosnold (1571–1607), explorer and colonist instrumental in the settlement of Virginia, and namer of Martha's Vineyard and Cape Cod in Massachusetts, was born in Grundisburgh.
- George William Lyttelton, teacher of classics and English literature at Eton
- Alice Driver, one of the 16th-century Ipswich Martyrs who was burnt at the stake for her Protestant beliefs in 1558.
- Sir Charles Blois, 1st Baronet, Tory Member of Parliament for Ipswich & Dunwich

== Notable buildings ==
There are 27 listed buildings in Grundisburgh, including one Grade I and one Grade II* building. Basts, just to the east of the church, is a Tudor building, built around 1520 by salter Thomas Awall. The father of his wife, Alice, was the master cook to Edward IV and Henry VII.

St Mary's Church is the largest place of worship in the village and is of the Church of England denomination. The existence of the church is recorded in 1254. The earliest parts of St Mary's Church, which is a Grade I listed building, date from approximately 1300 but it was enlarged in the 15th century with the addition of a clerestory. Within the church itself is a fine Suffolk hammerbeam roof and a mural of St Christopher dating from the 14th century, which is the largest of its type in the county.

The second expansion of the church came in 1527 when Thomas Awall built – or renovated – the Lady Chapel. A distinctive feature of the church is the 18th-century brick tower built between 1731 and 1732 according to the bequest of Robert Thinge, who has a commemorative plaque within the tower. The Tower also is the home of a Millennium Time Capsule that was sealed into the wall in 2000. Three towers have been planned for Grundisburgh church: the original 14th-century flint tower, the current 18th-century tower, and a 19th-century plan to clad the brickwork in flint and raise a spire on top of it.

Grundisburgh Baptist Chapel was built in 1798 and is one of the earliest dissenting religious buildings in the area. It is situated on the edge of the village and has been widely refurbished over the last few years. This included replacing the historic wooden pews with seats.

Post Mill Gardens marks the location of a post mill built in 1807 which worked until 1930 when the remains were made part of a house. Another mill, a miniature smock mill, stood a short distance north-west of the post mill from c.1885 until its demolition in about 1957.
