= Agnes Potten and Joan Trunchfield =

Two English women who were burned at the stake

Agnes Potten and Joan Trunchfield (both d. Ipswich, Suffolk, 19 February 1556) were two English Ipswich women who were imprisoned and burned at the stake during the Marian persecutions: both are commemorated among the Ipswich Martyrs. Their arrest followed immediately after the burning of Robert Samuel.

== Agnes Potten and Joan Trunchfield ==
Agnes Potten and Joan Trunchfield were two married townswomen of Ipswich of the artisan class, the husband of one being a shoemaker and the other a brewer. Joan's husband Michael Trunchfield, and also John Trunchfield, both of St Leonard's, Ipswich, were at some time under condemnation to be burnt, but it is not recorded that the sentences were carried out. (St Leonard's is not known: this may be a copyist's error for St Laurence.) At the time of the death of Queen Mary I in November 1558 no fewer than seventy-seven people in Ipswich and the neighbourhood lay under condemnation.

== They assist Robert Samuel ==
After the mandate against the married clergy, Robert Samuel, the displaced minister of East Bergholt, sent his wife to live in Ipswich. After Samuel's arrest, Mrs. Potten and Mrs. Trunchfield incurred the penalty of their own arrest and imprisonment by giving him aid and succour in the Ipswich town jail where he was first imprisoned. The Ipswich jailer John Bird had been sympathetic, and it was probably there, when Samuel was in company with other prisoners who belonged to the reformed faith, that Agnes and Joan ministered to him.

== Decision to stay, and premonition ==
After Samuel's arrest, a friend named Rose Nottingham urged the ladies to escape from Ipswich while there was still time to do so. However one of them (it is not known which) replied "I know well that it is lawful enough to fly away; which remedy you may use if you list. But my case standeth otherwise. I am tied to a husband, and have besides a sort of young children at home... Therefore I am minded, for the love of Christ and His truth, to stand to the extremity of the matter."

While he was in prison in Norwich, and was both tortured and starved, Robert Samuel experienced various visions and dreams. In a certain dream which he related to his friends, he seemed to see "three ladders set up toward heaven, of the which there was one somewhat longer than the rest, but at length they became one, joining (as it were) all three together." When he dreamed this, the two ladies were still at liberty.

== Arrest and imprisonment ==
Robert Samuel was burned at Ipswich on 31 August 1555, and on the following day, 1 September 1555, the women were arrested and imprisoned in the town jail. They remained in prison for five and a half months, during which Agnes Potten was at times "cast into marvellous great agonies and troubles of mind," but she remained "ardent and zealous" in her chosen course.

== Execution ==
The execution was carried out on 19 February 1556, in the presence of a crowd of people at the Cornhill in Ipswich. As they prepared themselves for the stake Joan Trunchfield 'much exceeded the other in joy and comfort.' They urged the bystanders 'to lay hold on the Word of God, and not upon man's devices and inventions.' Then, reciting words from the Scriptures, they were bound to the stake together, and when the fire was lit they held up their hands in the flames while they called upon God for help.

== Costs to the Borough of Ipswich ==
Expenses for the case of Agnes Potten and Joan Trunchfield, from accounts of Robert Sparrow and Jeffery Carr, Borough Chamberlains, for the Bailiffs William Rainbald and Robert Barker, in the third and fourth years of King Philip and Queen Mary.

- To Holmes the Sargeant for riding twice to Sir Clement Heigham's - 5s 4d. (Holmes was one of the four Sergeants at the Mace 1529–1557. Sir Clement Heigham was MP for Ipswich, and Speaker of the House of Commons, and lived at Barrow.)
- To Edward Balham (Sergeant) for carrying a letter to William Foster at the Bailiffs' instructions - 4d. (William Foster of Copdock was the Justice involved in the condemnation of Rowland Taylor and Robert Samuel)
- To Robert Barne, for riding to Needham Market for a hue and cry - 10d. (Robert Barne was one of the Sergeants in 1552.)
- To Thomas Robertson, for a gallon of wine given to Mr Chancellor - 7d.
- Charges for carrying four prisoners to Bury St Edmunds who were committed to perpetual prison - 15s 10d.
- Writ for the execution of the two women burned - 5s.
- To John Kerrison for certain 'yorns' relating to the executions - 3s 4d.
- For two loads of brushwood and a load of broom, and for cartage of them into the Town House - 8s 3d.
- For the Stake for the execution - 6d.
- To four men for carrying wood and broom to the place of execution - 4s 8d.
- To Mr Wheatcroft for serving out the commission to hold the executions - 35s.

== Sources ==
- John Foxe, The Booke of Martyrs
- N. F. Layard, Seventeen Suffolk Martyrs (Smiths, Ipswich 1903)
- Ipswich Borough Chamberlain's Accounts for 1555-1556 (Suffolk Record Office, C/3/3/2/2)
