= St Mildred's Church, Ipswich =

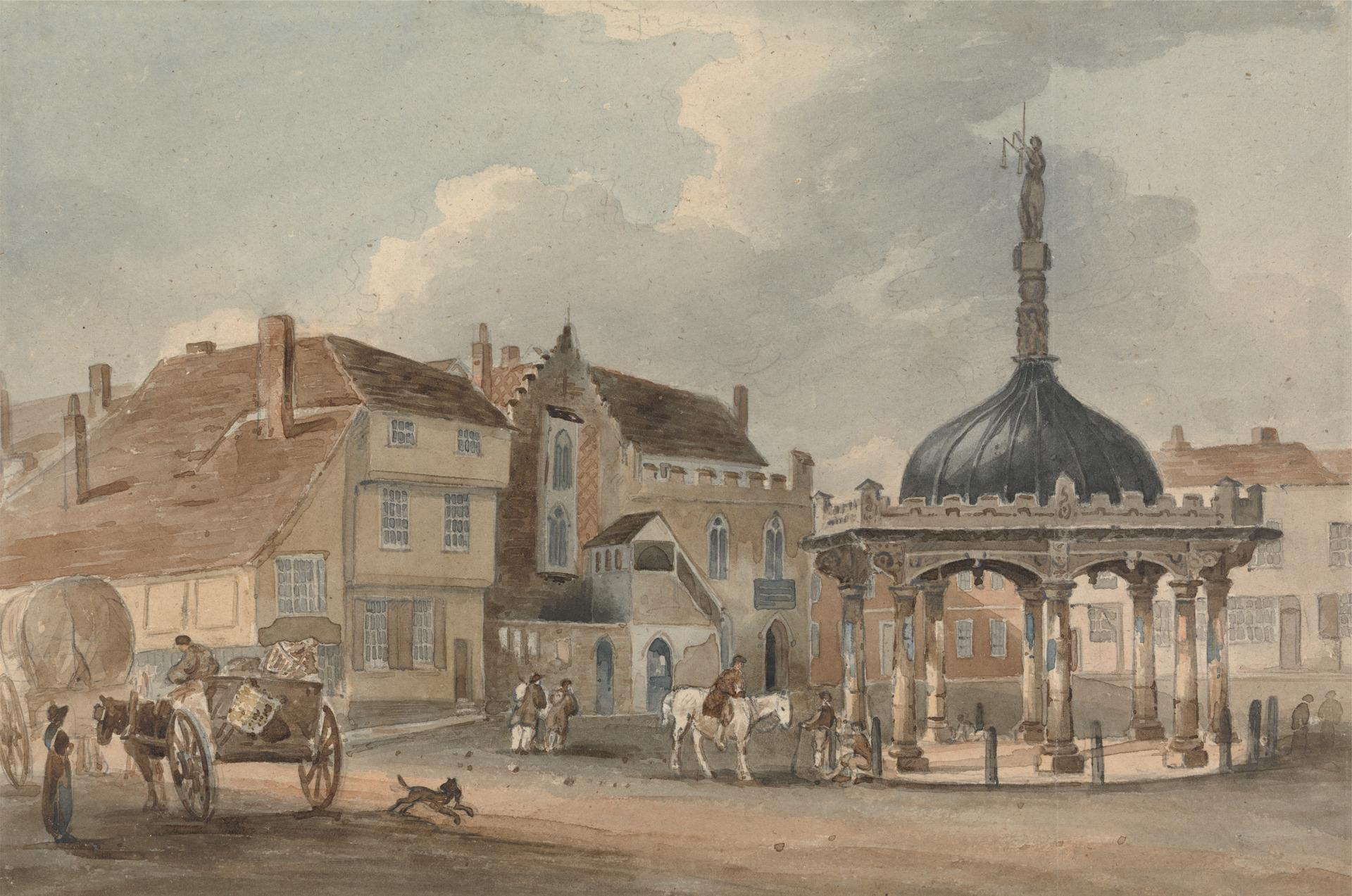
St Mildred's Church is visible as part of the Moot Hall in the background of this painting by George Frost (1754–1821)

St Mildred's Church, Ipswich was a parish church located at The Cornhill, Ipswich. It was dedicated to Saint Mildred, an Abbess of Thanet who died in the eighth century. The church was built shortly after her death, but became used as an administrative centre in the fourteenth century. Only a chapel was retained for religious use until the reformation.

== Ipswich Moot Hall ==
The parish of St Mildred dwindled in numbers such that by 1309 it was decided the parish no longer merited representation in Ipswich Corporation, the governing body of the town. The building was modified with creation of an upper floor to serves a meeting place for the Assembly; Other extensions and alterations were made, such as a roofed outer staircase fronting onto the Cornhill. This allowed access to the upper floor. It also featured an early water supply in the form of a conduit in the front wall. It became known as the Moot Hall or Guidhall. There is some evidence that the Anglo-Saxon Wuffinga Kings of East Anglia had a royal residence on the Cornhill next to St Mildred's Church.
