= Thomas Bilney =

16th-century English martyr

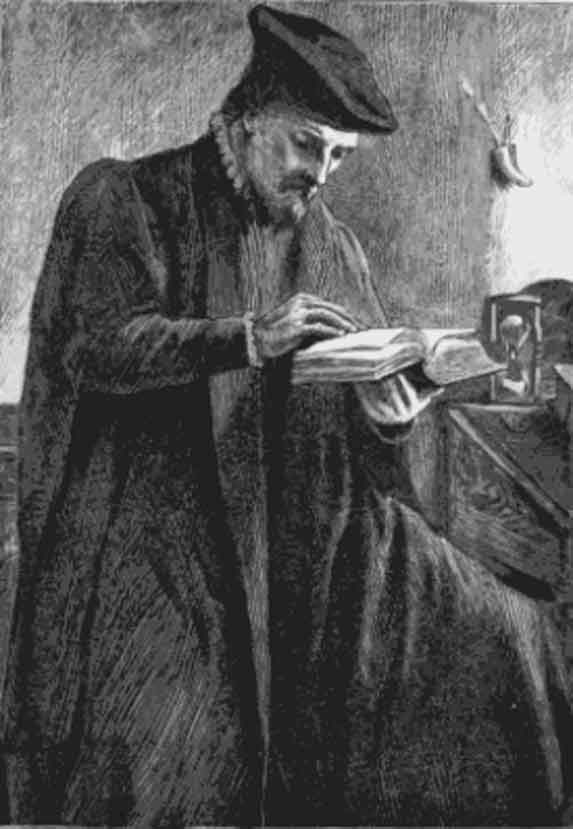
- Illustration from Foxe's Book of Martyrs, 1563
- Born: c. 1495; Norfolk, England
- Died: 19 August 1531 (aged c. 36); Lollards Pit, Norwich
- Cause of death: Death by burning
- Education: Trinity Hall, Cambridge
- Occupation: Clergyman

Thomas Bilney (c. 1495 – 19 August 1531) was an English priest, Protestant reformer, and martyr of the English Reformation.

== Early life ==
Thomas Bilney was born around 1495 in Norfolk, most likely in Norwich. Nothing is known of his parents except that they outlived him. He entered Trinity Hall, Cambridge at a young age, around the year 1510. During his life he was nicknamed 'Little Bilney' because of his short stature.

== Education ==
At Cambridge, he studied law, graduating LL.B. and taking holy orders in 1519. Finding no satisfaction in the mechanical system of the schoolmen, he turned his attention to the Greek edition of the New Testament published by Erasmus in 1516.

During his reading in the Epistles, he was struck by the words of 1 Timothy 1:15, which in English reads, "This is a faithful saying, and worthy of all acceptation, that Christ Jesus came into the world to save sinners; of whom I am the chief." "Immediately", he records, "I felt a marvellous comfort and quietness, insomuch that my bruised bones lept for joy, Psal. 51:8. After this, the Scripture began to be more pleasant unto me than the honey or the honeycomb; wherein I learned that all my labours, my fasting and watching, all the redemption of masses and pardons, being done without truth in Christ, who alone saveth his people from their sins; these I say, I learned to be nothing else but even, as St. Augustine saith, a hasty and swift running out of the right way".

The Scriptures now became his chief study, and his influence led other young Cambridge men to think along the same lines. Among his friends were Matthew Parker, the future Archbishop of Canterbury, and Hugh Latimer. Latimer, previously a strenuous conservative, was completely won over, and a warm friendship sprang up between him and Bilney. "By his confession", said Latimer, "I learned more than in twenty years before".

== Preaching and imprisonment ==
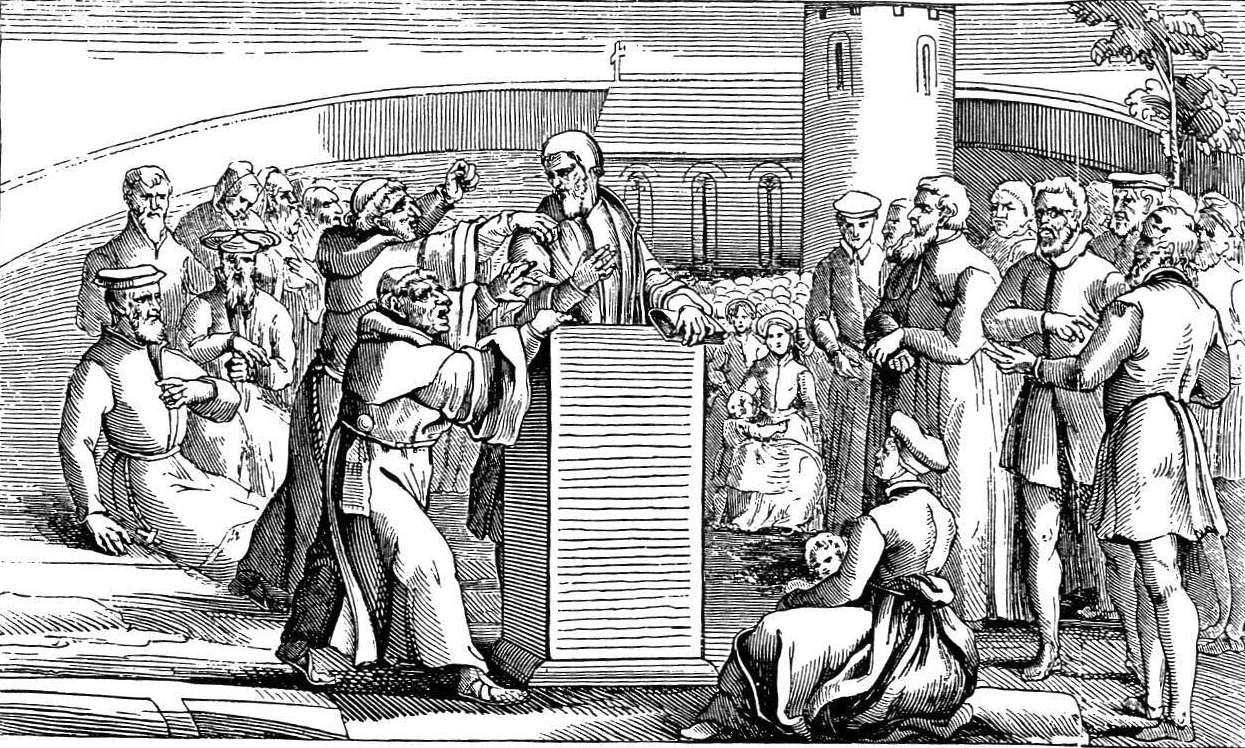
Bilney being molested while preaching at St George's Chapel, Ipswich, from Foxe's Book of Martyrs

In 1525 Bilney obtained a licence to preach throughout the diocese of Ely. He denounced saint and relic veneration, together with pilgrimages to Walsingham and Canterbury, and refused to accept the mediation of the saints. The diocesan authorities raised no objection, considering his diverging views to be of minor relevance to the essentials of the Christian faith, and he was orthodox on the authority of the Pope and Church, and on transubstantiation.

Cardinal Wolsey took a different view. In 1526 he appears to have summoned Bilney before him. On his taking an oath that he did not hold and would not disseminate the doctrines of Martin Luther, Bilney was dismissed. But in the following year serious objection was taken to a series of sermons preached by him in and near London, and he was dragged from the pulpit while preaching in St George's Chapel, Ipswich, arrested and imprisoned in the Tower. Arraigned before Wolsey, William Warham, Archbishop of Canterbury, and several bishops in the chapter-house at Westminster Abbey, he was convicted of heresy, sentence being deferred while efforts were made to induce him to recant, which eventually he did.

== Release, re-arrest and execution ==
After being kept for more than a year in the Tower, he was released in 1529, and went back to Cambridge. Here he was overcome with remorse for his apostasy, and after two years he was determined to preach again what he had held to be the truth. The churches being no longer open to him, he preached openly in the fields, finally arriving in Norwich, where the bishop, Richard Nix, caused him to be arrested. Articles were drawn up against him by Convocation, he was tried, degraded from his orders and handed over to the civil authorities to be burned. Protestant writer Jean-Henri Merle d'Aubigné's 1882 Martyrs of the Reformation relates that Bishop Cuthbert Tunstall "who was not a cruel man, was deeply moved, and then a strange struggle took place—a judge wishing to save the prisoner, the prisoner desiring to give up his life."

The sentence was carried out at Lollards Pit, Norwich on 19 August 1531. After witnessing Bilney's death, Bishop Nix is reported to have said, "I fear I have burned Abel and let Cain go".

A parliamentary inquiry was threatened into this case, not because Parliament approved of Bilney's doctrine but because it was alleged that Bilney's execution had been obtained by the ecclesiastics without the proper authorisation by the state. In 1534 Bishop Nix was condemned on this charge to the confiscation of his property.
