= Nina Frances Layard =

English poet, prehistorian, archaeologist and antiquarian

Nina Frances Layard FSA FLS
- Born: 20 August 1853; Stratford Essex
- Died: 12 August 1935 (aged 81); Ipswich
- Occupations: Poet; Prehistorian; Archaeologist; Antiquarian
- Partner: Mary Frances Outram

Nina Frances Layard FSA FLS ( 20 August 1853 Stratford, Essex – 12 August 1935, Ipswich) was an English poet, prehistorian, archaeologist and antiquarian who conducted important excavations, and by winning the respect of contemporary academics helped to establish a role for women in her field of expertise.

In about 1895 Layard met Mary Frances Outram; they formed a relationship and lived together. Layard was one of the first four women to be admitted as Fellow of the Society of Antiquaries of London, in the first year of admission, and was admitted Fellow of the Linnean Society in the second year of women's admission. In 1921 she was the first woman to be President of the Prehistoric Society of East Anglia.

== Early life and education ==
Nina Layard was born in Stratford, Essex on 20 August 1853 to Rev. Charles Clement Layard and Sarah, née Somes. Her father was first cousin to Sir Austen Henry Layard (excavator of Nineveh and Nimrud), Edgar Leopold Layard (Curator of the South African Museum at Cape Town, and Governor of Fiji), and Lady Charlotte Guest (translator of the Mabinogion and collector of ceramics). Her paternal grandfather, Brownlow Villiers Layard, was aide-de-camp and afterwards private chaplain to the Duke of Kent (and brother of the Governors of Malta and Curaçao and of Lady Lindsey), and was the son of a Dean of Bristol and grandson of the accoucheur Daniel Peter Layard. Rev. Charles Layard was also a maternal first cousin of Lady Llanover (of the Welsh cultural revival), being the son of Louisa Port, sister of Georgiana (favoured grandniece of Mrs Delany and companion of Fanny Burney), and therefore a descendant of Bernard Granville of Calwich and of Sir Richard Grenville of 'The Revenge'. Nina Layard's mother Sarah Somes was sister of Samuel Somes and the MP Joseph Somes. In the 1830s her brothers were the largest ship-owners in London and held contracts for convict shipping to Australia. Nina Layard was a sister of the essayist and litterateur George Somes Layard, and therefore the aunt of John Willoughby Layard, psychologist and anthropologist.

Nina Layard was interested in natural history from a young age and was an enthusiastic collector of eggs and shells as a child. While her only formal education consisted of attendance at a dame-school in Willesden, Middlesex, over the course of her life, she was encouraged in the pursuit of her passions by a number of scholars, including Leonard Jenyns and John Ellor Taylor. In 1873 the family moved to Combe-Hay rectory, Bath, where her father was the Rector, and Layard continued her collecting. She travelled around the world via New Zealand in 1878–9.

== Archaeological work ==
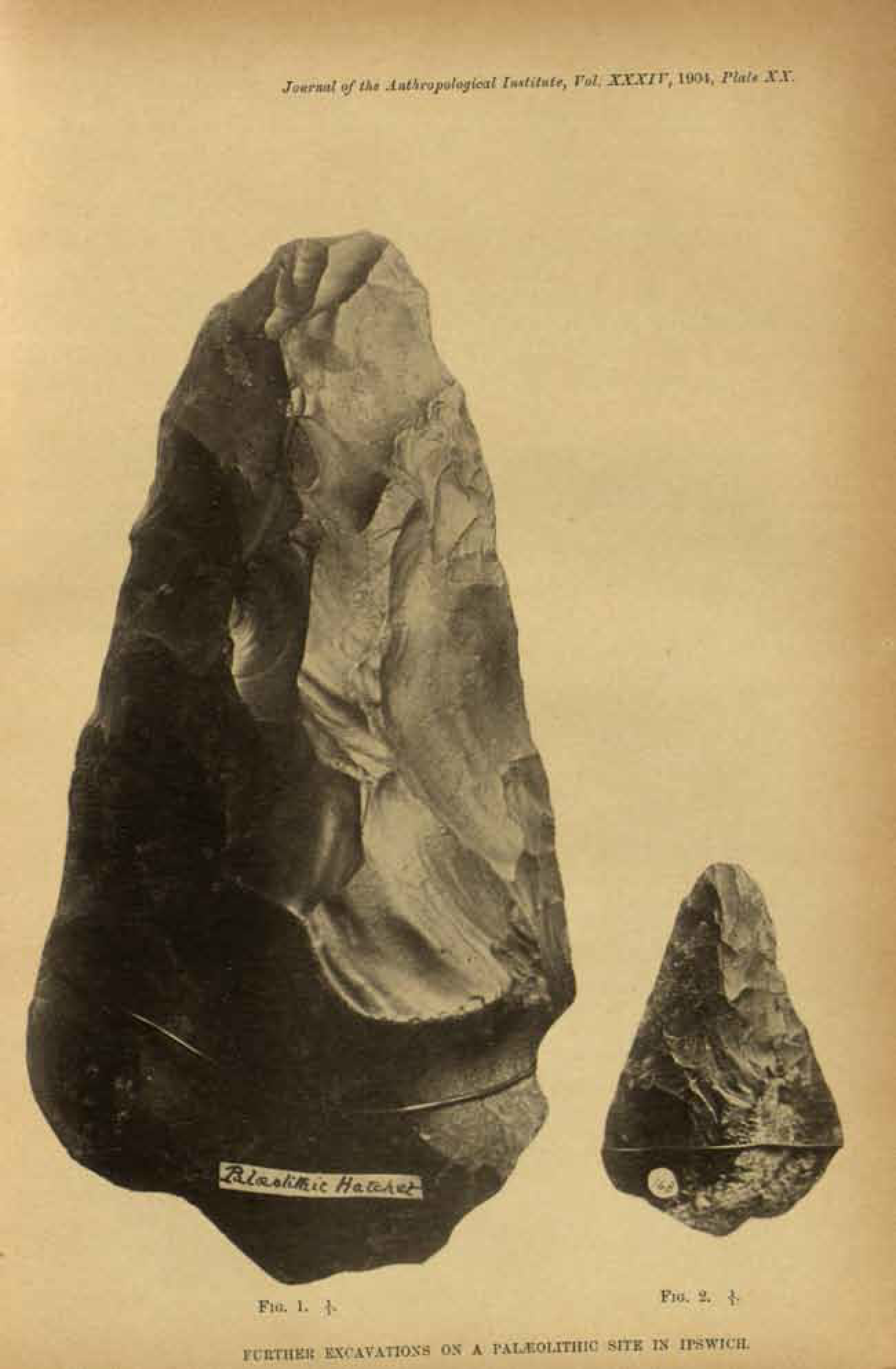
Implements from the Palaeolithic site in Ipswich. From Layard (1904)

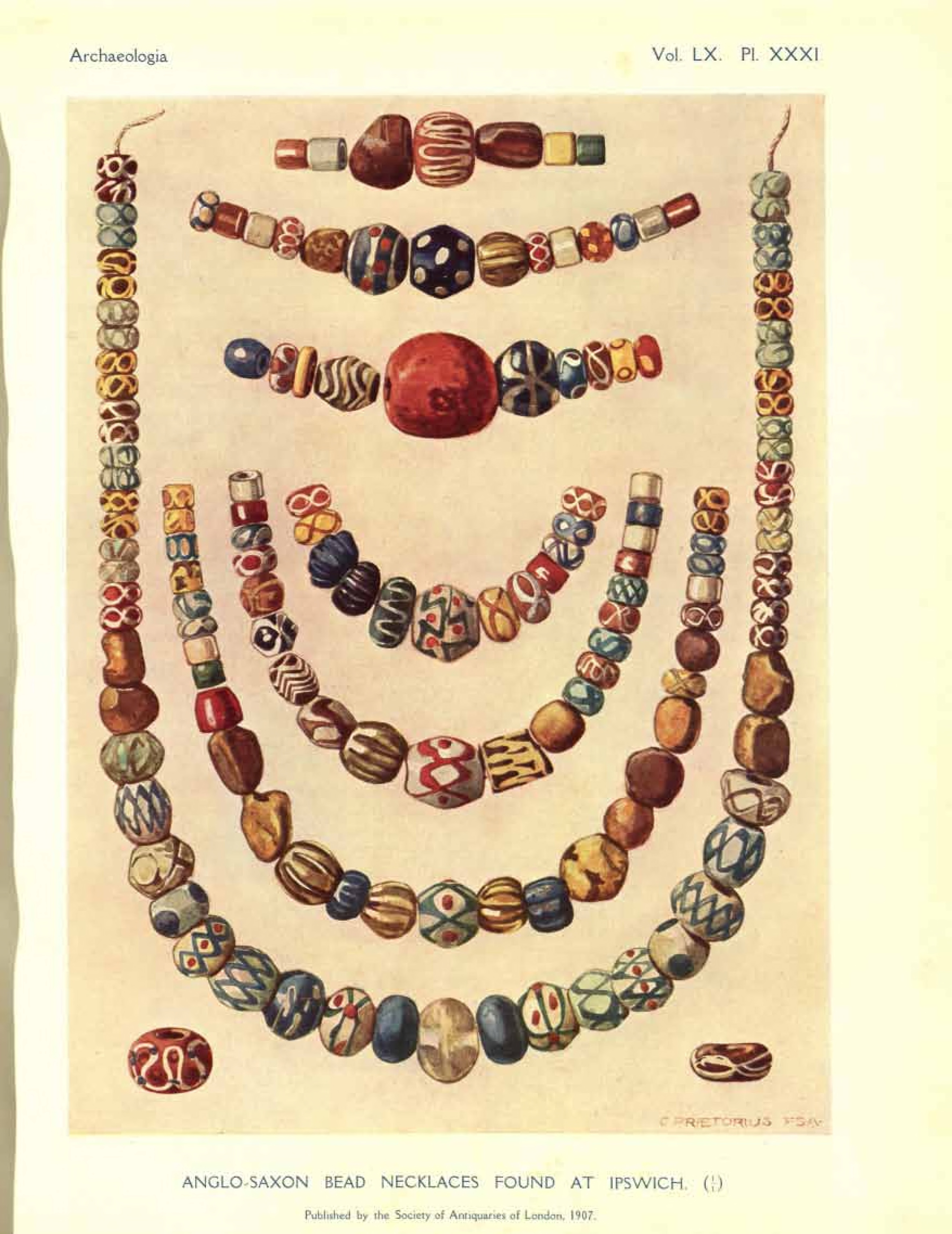
Anglo-Saxon Bead Necklaces from Ipswich. From Layard (1907)

Remarkably for the time, Layard directed multiple archaeological excavations. Her first, in 1898, was the Blackfriars monastery, Ipswich. Here she succeeded in locating the foundations walls of the medieval buildings. From 1902-1905, she conducted excavations at the Paleolithic site of Foxhall Road (Ipswich), arguably her most important contribution to the disciplines of archaeology and prehistory. Layard's work at Foxhall Road provided important evidence for the antiquity of humans (existence before the Ice Age), and her analysis of the stone tools discovered there enhanced understandings of the process of stone tool manufacture. In 1906-07, she excavated the Hadleigh Road site (Ipswich), an Anglo-Saxon cemetery under threat from a road-expansion project. Her work here documented 159 graves and their grave goods. The objects recovered were sent to the Ipswich Museum and her work on the site was published by the Society of Antiquaries (London), although as a woman, she herself was not allowed entry into the Society.

== Personal life ==
Layard moved to Ipswich in about 1890. Around 1895 she met and began a relationship with author, lecturer, and watercolourist Mary Frances Outram, daughter of Indian Civil Service official Sir Francis Outram, of Chantry House, Felixstowe, and granddaughter of Sir James Outram, 1st Baronet. The two women- who "had private means, influential family and social connections, and the leisure to pursue their interests"- lived together at "The Dowches", Kelvedon, Essex. Outram helped Layard in her research, and provided illustrations and transcriptions. Outram died on 31 May 1935; Layard died soon after on 12 August 1935. They were buried in a shared grave.

== Selected publications ==
- Layard, Nina Frances (1890). Poems. London: Longmans, Green.
- —— (1899). "Remarks on Wolsey's College and the Priory of St. Peter and St. Paul, Ipswich". Archaeological Journal. 56: 211–215. doi:10.1080/00665983.1899.10852820.
- —— (1899). "Original researches on the sites of religious houses of Ipswich: with plan of excavation" (PDF). Archaeological Journal. 56: 232–238. doi:10.1080/00665983.1899.10852823.
- —— (1902). Seventeen Suffolk martyrs. Ipswich: Smith, Suifall Press.
- —— (1903). "A recent discovery of Paleolithic implements in Ipswich" (PDF). The Journal of the Anthropological Institute of Great Britain and Ireland. 33: 41–43. doi:10.2307/2842989. JSTOR 2842989.
- —— (1904). "Further Excavations on a Palaeolithic Site in Ipswich". Journal of the Anthropological Institute of Great Britain and Ireland. 34: 306–310. doi:10.2307/2843104. JSTOR 2843104.
- —— (1906). "A winter's work on the Ipswich Palaeolithic site" (PDF). Journal of the Anthropological Institute of Great Britain and Ireland. 36: 233–236. doi:10.2307/1193259. JSTOR 1193259.
- —— (1907). "An Anglo-Saxon Cemetery in Ipswich". Archaeologia. 60 (2): 325–352. doi:10.1017/S0261340900005099.
- —— (1922). "Prehistoric cooking places in Norfolk" (PDF). Proceedings of the Prehistoric Society of East Anglia. 3 (4): 483–498. doi:10.1017/S0958841800024674.
- —— (1925). "Bronze Crowns and a Bronze Head-dress, from a Roman site at Cavenham Heath, Suffolk". The Antiquaries Journal. 5 (3): 258–265. doi:10.1017/S0003581500006715. S2CID 163954071.

== Sources ==
- S.J. Plunkett 1994, 'Nina Layard, Hadleigh Road and Ipswich Museum 1905-1908', Proceedings of the Suffolk Institute of Archaeology, 38(2), go to 164–166;167–192.
- S.J. Plunkett 1994, Guardians of the Gipping: Anglo-Saxon Treasures from Hadleigh Road, Ipswich (Ipswich Borough Council 1994).
- S.J. Plunkett 1995, 'Nina Layard and the Sub-Crag committee of 1910', in A. Longcroft and R. Joby (Eds), East Anglian Studies — Essays presented to J C Barringer (Norwich, Marwood), 211–222.
- S.J. Plunkett 1997, 'Hamlet Watling 1818-1908: artist and antiquary', Proceedings of the Suffolk Institute of Archaeology 39, 48–75.
- S.J. Plunkett 1999, 'Nina Frances Layard, Prehistorian (1835-1953)', in W Davies and R Charles (Eds), Dorothy Garrod and the Progress of the Palaeolithic: Studies in the palaeolithic archaeology of the Near East and Europe (Oxford: Oxbow), 242–262. digitized ISBN 1-900188-87-2.
- M. White and S.J. Plunkett, 2005, Miss Layard Excavates: a Palaeolithic site at Foxhall Road, Ipswich, 1903–1905 (Western Academic and Specialist Press: Liverpool). ISBN 0-9535418-8-6.
- S.J. Plunkett, 'Layard, Nina Frances (1853–1935), poet and archaeologist', Oxford Dictionary of National Biography.
