= Conjectural history =

Conjectural history is a type of historiography isolated in the 1790s by Dugald Stewart, who termed it "theoretical or conjectural history," as prevalent in the historians and early social scientists of the Scottish Enlightenment. As Stewart saw it, such history makes space for speculation about causes of events, by postulating natural causes that could have had such an effect. His concept was to be identified closely with the French terminology histoire raisonnée, and the usage of "natural history" by David Hume in his work The Natural History of Religion. It was related to "philosophical history", a broader-based kind of historical theorising, but concentrated on the early history of man in a type of rational reconstruction that had little contact with evidence.

Such conjectural history was the antithesis of the narrative history being written at the time by Edward Gibbon and William Robertson. Stewart defended it as more universal in its application to humankind, even at the cost of detailed documentation. It was not concerned with the political narrative and public life, but saw itself as an investigative "moral science". General philosophical history was somewhat closer to narrative history than conjectural history could be, with its reliance in part on tenuous arguments on the nature of feudalism and early ethnographical reports from European travellers. For Stewart the Dissertation on the Origin of Languages by Adam Smith was an important example. To justify the procedures of conjectural history, there needed to be an assumption of the uniformity of human nature, or as Stewart put it, the "capacities of the human mind".

Conjectural history has been identified as "the core of a theory" of progress within Scottish philosophical history of the period. Pocock writes that Scottish conjectural history was "of considerable importance to Gibbon and the creation of philosophical historiography". By the 1780s there were European historians of culture who worked in a different way, preferring an inductive method to the pure deductions of conjectural history. In the later development of anthropology and archaeology, opposition to the whole "conjectural history" tradition led to the development of culture history.

== Early Modern context ==
There was nothing new in the idea of stages of society on its own, but social thinking itself was changing in Early Modern Europe, particularly on civil society in its components, civility and "society".

=== Models and the "savage" ===
Margaret Hodgen comments, in a chapter 'From Hierarchy to History', on the widespread use of "conjectural series" for historical explanation in the Early Modern period. The great chain of being was a static idea. "Stage series" had roots in classical thought, but might be associated with cyclic models, or incorporate ideas of decline with those of progress. She writes that in time

... it seems certain that hierarchical ideas, temporalized to suit the needs of the conjectural historian of culture, were mixed with historical assumptions concerning the savage as a conjectural first member of these conjectural series.

=== Early Modern natural history ===
While the Natural History of Pliny the Elder was a classical Roman encyclopedic work, "natural history" had several different meanings in the Early Modern period. The one relevant in this article is the Baconian natural history, i.e. a systematic collection of observable information on natural phenomena. A natural history did not belong to natural philosophy, which was theoretical.

=== Histoire raisonnée ===
The histoire raisonnée was a genre of historical writing developed in France in the 17th century, with concerns for the individual in social context, and the description of culture and customs as integral to history. It grew out of humanist historiography with its close relationship to classical Roman and Greek models, but brought to the surface social matters, in particular as they could explain the motivations of individuals. With Géraud de Cordemoy there came an interest in causality as playing a part in historical movement, as distinct from the humanist acceptance of personal fates being subject to Fortune.

=== Stadial history ===
Contemporary terminology is stadial history, or in other words the discussion of stages of society by theoretical means (see sociocultural evolution#Stadial theory). Stadial theory as an innovation is attributed to the jurist Samuel Pufendorf. Grotius had already used conjectural history to discuss Aquinas on private property.

Some basic conjectural history on human civilization was therefore discussed in the 17th century. Later Jean-Jacques Rousseau rejected the concept of the state of nature, and with Count Buffon debated the rise of civilization. The Scottish contribution then took the theory to a new level, with its anthropocentrism and detailed explanations of human manipulation of nature. It laid emphasis on a typical society at its beginnings, regarding evidence from contemporary reports (particularly of Native Americans) as valid.

== Conjectural histories of language and writing ==
Adam Smith in lectures on rhetoric, given from 1748, advanced a speculative history of language; he wrote that he had been prompted by a 1747 work of Gabriel Girard. He was then interested in our awareness of literary style. This is the example that Dugald Stewart took up in coining the phrase "conjectural history". Elements would have been recognised at the time as drawing on the Bible, and in classical literature Lucretius; it is now considered Smith was influenced by Montesquieu on law and government. The theory on language and its typology over time has been seen as typical of Smith's historical approach; and even the foundation of his later well-known work on political economy. Caveats have also been entered, by David Raphael: it cannot be stretched to Smith's history of astronomy; and the term can be seen as a misnomer.

Monboddo, on the other hand, wrote at length a conjectural history of language because he emphasised the history of manners. William Warburton had proposed a stadial conjectural history of writing in his Divine Legation of Moses, a work supporting biblical authority, around 1740. It was taken up in France after the translation in Essai sur les hiéroglyphes des Égyptiens. Where writing moved from pictograms to alphabets, he saw language use as having moved analogously from gestures to forms and figures of speech.

== The four stages theory ==
The term "conjectural history" was not generally accepted in Stewart's time. There was an orthodox four stages theory of society, the stages being:

1. hunting;
2. pasturage;
3. agriculture; and
4. commerce.

This ladder-like ordering was taken to be a strict, linear progression, or unilineal evolution. Some economic determinism applied, in the sense that the baseline of subsistence was assumed to have a serious effect on social matters. The stages were supposed to represent progress on a moral level, as well as that of economic complexity. French as well as Scottish Enlightenment writers subscribed to such a pattern.

The invention of this type of theory (three or four stages) is attributed to a number of European writers from the 1750s onwards, such as Adam Smith, Turgot and Vico. In the Scottish context it appears in works from 1758 by David Dalrymple and Lord Kames; it has been argued that their source was the Edinburgh lectures of Smith on jurisprudence. In France it was published at much the same time, also, by Claude Pierre Goujet, Claude Adrien Helvétius, and François Quesnay. Smith's "natural progress of opulence" is a closely related theory.

== Representative works ==
Besides Adam Smith, prominent Scottish authors in the field of conjectural history included Adam Ferguson, David Hume, Lord Kames, John Millar, and Lord Monboddo, writing from the later 1750s to later 1770s. Smith, Kames and Millar were content to adhere to the four stage theory. Monboddo's stadial history was more complex, and very much more controversial. He included primates and feral children as material. Robertson in his History of America moves between narrative and conjectural history.

=== Adam Ferguson, An Essay on the History of Civil Society (1767) ===
Ferguson in this work attempted a rigorous identification of the hunter stage with the so-called barbarian or savage, and was very alive to the whole scheme as full of tensions within human possibility. He argued against the foundation story in the style of classical history, proposing instead that unintended consequences could have more to do with the "establishment" of a society than a self-conscious law-giver.

=== John Millar, Observations concerning the Distinction of Ranks in Society (1771) ===
Millar argued in terms of a "system of manners" associated with each of the four stages. He also discussed the advance of freedom, and denounced slavery. As property became more complex, it followed that government did so also. Poovey states that this work makes apparent the relationship of conjectural history with the experimental moral philosophy of Thomas Reid and George Turnbull.

=== Lord Kames, Sketches of the History of Man (1774) ===
Kames has been called the leader of Scottish conjectural history, and had objections he expressed in correspondence to both Rousseau and the approach of Montesquieu, as reducing the role of human nature, which he thought was not a constant but the goal of the investigation. The connection was that conjectural history was to be used as a framework of a discussion of natural law. In writing to Basel in search of a suitable opponent to Rousseau, Kames prompted a work from Isaak Iselin, Ueber die Geschichte der Menschheit (1764), which is also a conjectural history.

The Sketches was a collection of essays on social, cultural and political topics. In it the author collected some ethnographic and miscellaneous information, assembling in particular a long chapter intended as a "history of women". There was a second edition (Edinburgh, 1778) and a third (Dublin, 1779). Kames was an early polygenist, or was an environmental monogenist only with scepticism about the adequacy of the theory. In any case he argued that his approach could be reconciled with the scriptural ethnography, via the story of the Tower of Babel. While he stated that he had collected materials for a history for 30 years, Kames's work as written up was unsystematic, even rambling. His scheme of conjectural history includes the idea that the providential order allows the historian to write in the absence of a full factual basis. A German translation by Anton Ernst Klausing appeared as Versuche über die Geschichte des Menschen from 1774.

== Later developments ==
=== The tradition comes to an end ===
Mainstream conjectural and philosophical history, in the Scottish style, hardly survived as a living tradition into the 1790s. Works went out of print; younger authors such as John Adams and John Logan failed to renew the ideas, with Alexander's History of Women (1779) being criticised as shallow. Dugald Stewart's formulation of conjectural history was published in 1794, in his Account of Adam Smith for the Transactions of the Royal Society of Edinburgh. The question has been raised as to Stewart's intention then in describing the tradition in that way, and John Burrow has argued that he wished to dissociate Smith from political radicalism.

Where stadial theory appeared in later authors, the original thrust was distorted. Hopfl has said that the heirs were James Mill, John Stuart Mill, and Auguste Comte. Hawthorne writes instead of the historical/sociological insights of the Scots being lost in the British context, despite the "tension between a 'natural' account of civil society and a developing sense of the factual importance and moral difficulties of individualism" having become apparent, to utilitarianism and vaguer evolutionism.

=== Religious opposition ===
The Encyclopædia Britannica, in its second edition but particularly in its third edition (1797), attacked the premises of conjectural history from a biblical angle. In the second edition James Tytler opposed the polygenist approach of Kames. The third edition, under the editorship of George Gleig, featured "Savage" as a new topic, and expanded articles "Society" and "Moral philosophy". Cross-referenced to theological and biblical topics, and to articles by David Doig who had answered Kames with Two Letters on the Savage State from 1775/6, these articles in particular argued the orthodox Christian case. Robert Heron contributed to the article "Society", and took aim at the four stages theory, claiming polygenism followed from it (in contradiction to the Bible). Further, the assumption of a baseline state of savagery also seemed to Heron to be implicated with polygenism; and he with Doig attacked the assumption as echoing Lucretius and Democritus, and godless materialist spontaneous generation of humankind, implicit in the whole idea of conjectural history. The articles on "Beauty" and "Love" were also changed to remove the influence of Kames, as part of the consistent assertion of scriptural monogenism.

=== Relationship to antiquarianism ===
Conjectural argument had a bad name in 18th century British antiquarian circles. An austere and sceptical approach centred on facts, as adopted by Richard Gough and James Douglas, was favoured in the second half of the century. On the other hand, the interpretations of the stadial theory were quite welcome, and while popularised by the Scottish school, did not seem innovative in the sense of a break with Early Modern historiography, and concerns with natural law and civic humanism. The urban history of John Trussel was a precursor. The discussion of the breakdown of the feudal system was a topic of considerable antiquarian interest. The stadial history was embraced by Thomas Pownall.

=== Conjectural history of peoples ===
Charles Athanase Walckenaer in 1798 took up the four stage theory, augmented to five stages, by dividing "hunting" into "gathering" followed by a pure hunting stage. This was an effort to classify peoples of the world by development. Early anthropology carried into the 19th century assumptions about the search for origins of civilisation, and unilineal evolution, as appropriate tools for investigating societies. It was widely assumed, further, that current "peoples" were a window into the past. These approaches were seen in Lewis Henry Morgan. Eventually, in the 20th century, field work and structural functionalism led to a rejection of the whole paradigm.
