= Bot =

Bot or BOT may refer to:

== Sciences ==
=== Computing and technology ===
- Robot, or "bot", a mechanical device that can perform physical tasks
- Chatbot, a computer program that converses in natural language
- Internet bot, a software application that runs automated tasks (scripts) over the Internet
  - Spambot, an internet bot designed to assist in the sending of spam
- Internet Relay Chat bot, a set of scripts or an independent program that connects to IRC as a client
- Social bot, a type of chatbot that is employed in social media networks to automatically generate messages
  - Twitter bot, a program used to produce automated posts on the Twitter microblogging service
- Video game bot, a computer-controlled player or opponent
- Wikipedia bot, an internet bot which performs tasks in Wikipedia
- Zombie computer, part of a botnet

=== Biology and medicine ===
- BOT, base of tongue, in medicine
- Bot, the lesion caused by a botfly larva
- Borderline ovarian tumor, a tumor of the ovaries

== Places ==
- Bni Ounjel Tafraout, a commune in Taounate Province, Taza-Al Hoceima-Taounate, Morocco
- Bot, Tarragona, a town in Spain
- Bot River, South Africa
- Botswana, IOC and FIFA trigram BOT
- British Overseas Territories, territories under the jurisdiction and sovereignty of the UK
- Bucharest Old Town

== People ==
=== Groups ===
- Bot caste, a Hindu caste of Nepali origin found in the Indian state of Uttar Pradesh
- Bot people, or Boto people, a community in Jammu and Kashmir

=== Individuals ===
- Ajaw B'ot, 8th century Maya king of the city of Seibal
- Ben Bot, Dutch politician
- Călin Ioan Bot, Romanian Greek Catholic bishop
- G. W. Bot, Australian printmaker, sculptor, painter and graphic artist
- Jeanne Bot, French supercentenarian
- Theo Bot, Dutch politician

== Brands and enterprises ==
- Bank of Taiwan, a bank headquartered in Taipei, Taiwan
- Bank of Tanzania, the central bank of the United Republic of Tanzania
- Bank of Thailand, the central bank of Thailand
- Blue Orange Theatre, an independent theatre in Birmingham, England
- Bolt On Technology, an American software development company
- The Bank of Tokyo, a defunct Japanese bank now part of The Bank of Tokyo-Mitsubishi UFJ
- Bot, a line of budget desktop PCs manufactured by Alienware

== Business terminology ==
- Balance of trade, difference between the monetary value of exports and imports
- Build–operate–transfer, a form of project financing

== Sports ==
- Bobby Orr Trophy, the championship trophy of the Eastern Conference of the Ontario Hockey League
- Brava Opening Tournament, a football tournament in Brava, Cape Verde

== Transportation ==
- Air Botswana (ICAO: BOT)
- Bosset Airport (IATA: BOT), in Bosset, Papua New Guinea
- Bryn Oer Tramway, a narrow gauge railway built in South Wales in 1814

== Other uses ==
- "B.O.T.", a 1986 episode of The Transformers
- Bot, short for ubosot, the ordination hall of a Buddhist temple in Thailand
- Barn Owl Trust, a charity in Waterleat, Ashburton, Devon, England
- Bon Om Touk, the Cambodian Water Festival
- Board of Trustees (BoT) or board of directors

== See also ==
- Bots (disambiguation)
- Bott (disambiguation)
- Break On Through (disambiguation)
- Burr Oak Township (disambiguation)
- Robot (disambiguation)
