= Botts =

Botts is a surname of European origin. The name refers to:

- Baker Botts International law firm named for James Addison Baker and Confederate Colonel Walter Browne Botts
- Chantal Botts (b. 1976), South African Olympic badminton player
- Elbert Dysart Botts (1893–1962), American highway engineer
- Jason Botts (b. 1980), American professional baseball player
- John Botts (1802–1869), American politician from Virginia; U.S. representative 1839–49
- Lee Botts (1928–2019), American environmentalist and conservationist
- Mike Botts (1944–2005), American rock drummer
- Timothy Botts (contemporary), American calligrapher and illustrator

== See also ==
- Bott
- Gasterophilus intestinalis or horse botfly: infestation of a horse's stomach by maggots of this insect is known as "the botts"
