= Isaac Jones =

Isaac Jones may refer to:

== Sports ==
- Isaac Jones (American football) (born 1975), American football player
- Isaac Jones (basketball) (born 2000), American basketball player
- Isaac Jones (sprinter) (born 1990), Gambian sprinter

== Others ==
- Isaac Dashiell Jones (1806–1893), Maryland politician
- Isaac Jones (magistrate), Welsh magistrate
- Isaac Jones (priest) (1804–1850), translator and curate of St Deiniol's Church, Llanddaniel Fab, Wales
- Isaac Jones (mayor), Mayor of Philadelphia, Pennsylvania from 1767 to 1769
- Isaac Jones (physician), Australian physician
- Ike Jones (1929–2014), American producer and actor and former husband of actress Inger Stevens
