= Burr Oak Township, Kansas =

Burr Oak Township, Kansas may refer to:

- Burr Oak Township, Doniphan County, Kansas
- Burr Oak Township, Jewell County, Kansas

== See also ==
- List of Kansas townships
- Burr Oak Township (disambiguation)
