= Bott =

Bott is an English and German surname. Notable people with the surname include:

- Alan Bott (1893–1952), British military aviator and journalist
- Carola Bott (born 1984), German badminton player
- Catherine Bott (born 1952), English soprano
- Charlie Bott (born 1941), English rugby player
- CJ Bott (born 1995), New Zealand footballer
- Ed Bott, American technology journalist and author
- Edward Alexander Bott (1887–1974), Canadian psychologist
- Edward Charles Arden Bott (1924–2005), British physician
- François Bott (1935–2022), French author
- Helen McMurchie Bott, Canadian author
- Izzy Thornton-Bott (born 1998), Australian middle-distance runner
- Jean Joseph Bott, German violinist and composer
- John Bott, English cricketer
- Leon Bott (born 1986), Australian rugby league footballer
- Leonidas Bott (1889–1969), Australian cricketer
- Lloyd Bott (1917–2004), senior Australian public servant
- Margaret Glen Bott, British surgeon
- Mark Bott (born 1986), English cricketer
- Markus Bott (born 1962), German boxer
- Martin Bott (1926–2018), English geophysicist
- Mostapha Bott (born 2004), Algerian footballer
- Nina Bott (born 1978), German actress
- Olly Ashall-Bott (born 1997), English rugby league footballer
- Randy L. Bott (born 1945), American academic
- Raoul Bott (1923–2005), Hungarian-American mathematician
- Richard Bott (born 1968), Canadian Protestant minister
- Richard Bott (skeleton racer), British skeleton racer
- Thomas Bott (1688–1754), Church of England clergyman
- Valerie Bott, Museum consultant and historian
- Violet Elizabeth Bott, character in a Richmal Crompton novel.
- Wilf Bott (1907–1992), English footballer

== See also ==
- Atiyah–Bott fixed-point theorem
- Borel–Weil–Bott theorem
- Bott periodicity theorem
- Bott residue formula
- Bot (disambiguation)
