= Bots =

Bots may refer to:

- The plural form of Bot (disambiguation)

== Places ==
- British Overseas Territories, or BOTs, territories under the jurisdiction and sovereignty of the United Kingdom

== Arts, entertainment, and media ==
- Bots!!, a 2006 massively multiplayer online game distributed by Acclaim Games
- Bots (band), a Dutch-language folk rock group
- The Bots, American indie rock band

== See also ==
- Big Brother's Bit on the Side (BBBOTS), a daily news/magazine show discussing the television program Big Brother
- Bott (disambiguation)
- Robot (disambiguation)
