= William Webster (theologian) =

British priest, theologian, and author (1689–1758)

William Webster (December 1689 – 4 December 1758) was a British priest in the Church of England and a theological writer.

== Life ==
Born at Cove, Suffolk in December 1689, was the son of Richard Webster (d. 1722), by his wife Jane, daughter of Anthony Sparrow; his father was a nonjuring clergyman, who later submitted and became vicar of Poslingford. Webster was educated at Beccles, and was admitted to Gonville and Caius College, Cambridge, on 2 March 1708. He graduated B.A. in 1712, M.A. in 1716, and D.D. in 1732.

Webster was ordained deacon on 24 June 1713 as curate of Depden in Suffolk, and priest on 26 February 1716 as curate of St. Dunstan-in-the-West, London. Leaving St. Dunstan's in 1731, he was appointed in August 1732 to the curacy of St Clement, Eastcheap, and in February 1733 was presented to the rectory of Depden.

In July 1740 he was instituted to the vicarages of Ware, Hertfordshire and Thundridge, which he retained till his death, resigning his rectory and curacy. In later life he fell into great poverty. He died unmarried at Ware on 4 December 1758.

== Works ==
Webster was a voluminous writer. In 1723 he edited The Life of General Monk (London), from the manuscript of Thomas Skinner, contributing a preface in vindication of George Monck's character. A second edition appeared in 1724. In 1730 he translated ‘The New Testament, with Critical Remarks’ (London, 2 vols.), from the French of Richard Simon.

On 16 December 1732, under the pseudonym of ‘Richard Hooker of the Inner Temple,’ he began to edit a periodical entitled The Weekly Miscellany; not very successful, it was discontinued on 27 June 1741. From the number of religious essays it contained it became known as ‘Old Mother Hooker's Journal.’ It is known for the attacks made in its columns on William Warburton's Divine Legation of Moses. Webster's contributions to the controversy were republished probably in 1739, under the title of Remarks on the Divine Legation. They earned him a place in the Dunciad, Alexander Pope, in 1742, inserting a passage (bk. ii. l. 258) in which Webster was coupled with George Whitefield, who had also criticised Warburton.

In 1740, from materials furnished by a merchant, Webster published a pamphlet on the wool industry called Consequences of Trade to the Wealth and Strength of any Nation, by a Draper of London. It sold well and went into a fifth edition in 1741, the same year as Webster wrote a refutation of his own arguments, published under the pseudonym Andrew Freeport as The Draper Confuted.

Christopher Smart addressed to Webster his seventh ode, complimenting him on his ‘Casuistical Essay on Anger and Forgiveness’ (London, 1750). Other works were:

- ‘The Clergy's Right of Maintenance vindicated from Scripture and Reason,’ London, 1726; 2nd edit. 1727.
- ‘The Fitness of the Witnesses of the Resurrection of Christ considered,’ London, 1731.
- ‘The Credibility of the Resurrection of Christ,’ London, 1735.
- A Complete History of Arianism from 306 to 1666. To which is added the History of Socinianism translated from the French of Louis Maimbourg and Bernard Lamy, London, 1735, 2 vols.
- ‘Tracts, consisting of Sermons, Discourses, and Letters,’ London, 1745.
- ‘A Vindication of his Majesty's Title to the Crown,’ London, 1747.
- ‘A Treatise on Places and Preferments,’ London, 1757.
- ‘A plain Narrative of Facts, or the Author's case fairly and candidly stated’ (London, 1758), asking for money.

== Notes ==
Attribution

This article incorporates text from a publication now in the public domain: "Webster, William". Dictionary of National Biography. London: Smith, Elder & Co. 1885–1900.
