= Chattanooga Public Library =

Public library in Chattanooga, Tennessee

Coordinates: 35.04436°N 85.31081°W

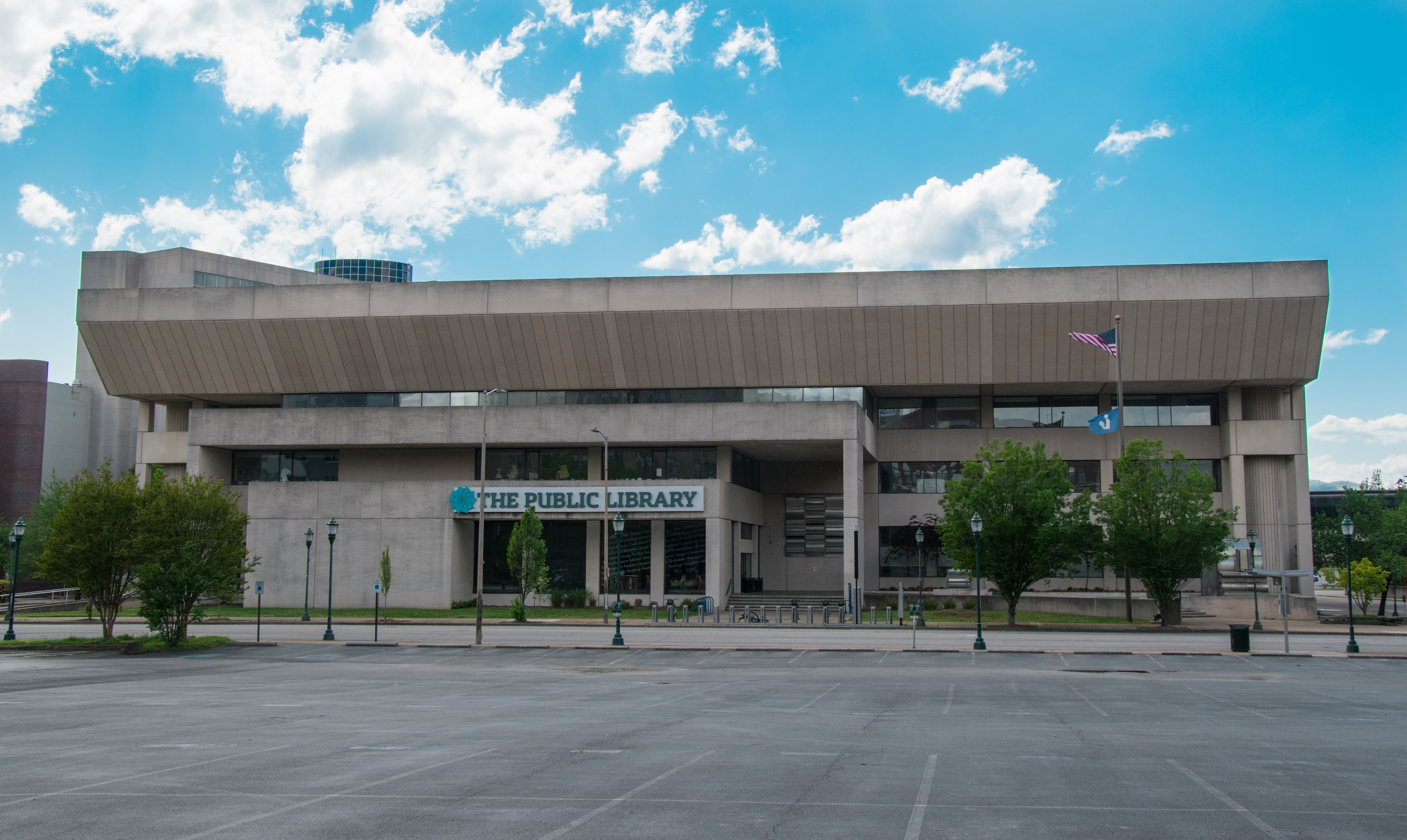
- The Chattanooga Public Library's flagship downtown location
- Location: 1001 Broad Street, Chattanooga, Tennessee
- Established: 1905
- Branches: 5

Access and use
- Population served: 184,086

Other information
- Director: Will O’Hearn
- Website: https://www.chattlibrary.org/

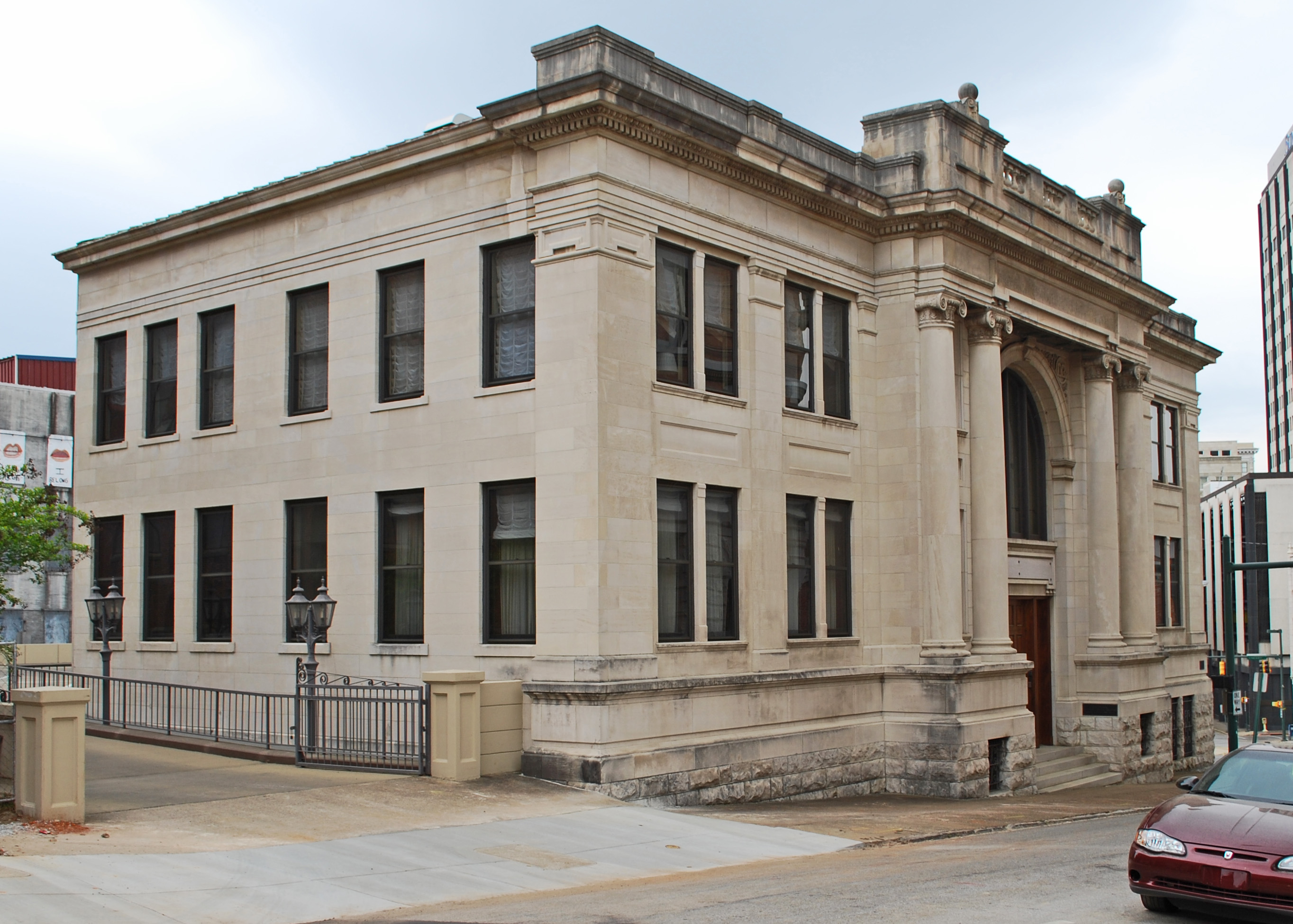
The Old Library Building, the library's former location

The Chattanooga Public Library (est. 1905) of Chattanooga, Tennessee, is a municipal public library overseen by the city government. As of 1928 it ran the Hamilton County public library. In 2013 it opened a makerspace. The current building, located on Broad Street, opened in 1976 and was designed in the Brutalist fashion, garnering Derthick, Henley & Wilkerson Architects a Gulf States Regional AIA award. The library system was previously known as the Chattanooga-Hamilton County Bicentennial Library. The name of the institution was changed back to the Chattanooga Public Library in 2011 as a sales tax agreement between the city and county expired and the library's status reverted to being funded by the city and governed by a board.

A former building of the library system is listed on the National Register of Historic Places as Old Library Building. It was a Carnegie library built in 1904. As the city grew and the needs of the population changed, the Carnegie library building was replaced by one on the corner of McCallie Avenue and Douglas Street. In use until 1976 for the library, it is now Fletcher Hall, housing the Gary W. Rollins College of Business, a part of the University of Tennessee at Chattanooga.

== List of databases ==
As of 2014 the library arranges for its patrons access to digital content from several providers:

Title	Producer
3M Cloud Library	3M
Academic Onefile	Cengage
Ancestry Library Edition	Ancestry.com
Archives Unbound	Cengage
Axis 360	Baker & Taylor
Books & Authors	Cengage
Brainfuse	Brainfuse
Business Gateway	Cengage
Career Transitions	Cengage
Chattanooga Obituaries	Chattanooga Public Library
Commercial Appeal Newspaper	Cengage
Core Concepts	Rosen Publishing
Culinary Arts Collection	Cengage
DemographicsNow	Cengage
Digital Literacy	Rosen Publishing
Financial Literacy	Rosen Publishing
Fold3 (no longer provided online from this library)	EBSCO Industries
Gale Virtual Reference Library	Cengage
Gardening, Landscape and Horticulture Collection	Cengage
Genealogy Connect	Cengage
General Business OneFile	Cengage
General OneFile	Cengage
General Reference Center Gold	Cengage
Health and Wellness Resource Center	Cengage
Heritage Quest	Cambridge Information Group
Home Improvement Collection	Cengage
Hoopla	Midwest Tape LLC
Jobs & Careers Gateway	Cengage
Kids' Gateway	Tennessee State Library and Archives
Kids InfoBits	Cengage
Knoxville News Sentinel Newspaper	Cengage
Learn 4 Life	Cengage
LearningExpress Library	LearningExpress, LLC
LegalForms	Cengage
Magazines from Zinio	Gilvest
Mitchell Car Repair	Snap-on
MyHeritage - World Vital Records	MyHeritage
National Geographic Kids	Cengage
National Geographic Virtual Library	Cengage
National Newspaper Index	Cengage
New England Ancestors Online	New England Historic Genealogical Society
One-Click Digital Audiobooks	Recorded Books
OverDrive Media Download Library	OverDrive
Popular Magazines	Cengage
Power Knowledge	Rosen Publishing
PowerSearch	Cengage
PowerSpeak Languages	Cengage
Reference USA	CCMP Capital
Safari Books	O'Reilly Media
Small Business Collection	Cengage
Student Edition - K12	Cengage
Student Edition InfoTrac	Cengage
Teen Health and Wellness	Rosen Publishing
Tennessean Newspaper	Cambridge Information Group
Tennessee Death Records	Tennessee State Library and Archives
Tennessee Maps 1885-1955	Cambridge Information Group
Tennessee Virtual Archive	Tennessee State Library and Archives
Tennessee's Landmark Documents	Tennessee State Library and Archives
Testing and Education Reference Center	Cengage
Travel eBooks	Cengage
Treehouse	Treehouse
TumbleBook Library	Tumbleweed Press
U.S. History Collection	Cengage
Volunteer Voices	Tennessee State Library and Archives
World Book Encyclopedia	World Book,
World History Collection	Cengage
