= The Divine Legation of Moses =

Book by William Warburton

The Divine Legation of Moses is the best-known work of William Warburton, an English theologian of the 18th century who became bishop of Gloucester. As its full title makes clear, it is a conservative defence of orthodox Christian belief against deism, by means of an apparent paradox: the afterlife is not mentioned in terms in the Pentateuch (i.e. Torah – see Jewish eschatology), making Mosaic Judaism distinctive among ancient religions; from which, Warburton argues, it is seen that Moses received a divine revelation.

The Divine Legation was published in two parts and nine books from 1738 by Warburton, who left it unfinished. It is a learned and discursive work, and excited extensive controversy in Warburton's lifetime, which the author pursued with acrimony. One side-issue, the history of writing, was treated by Warburton in a manner that proved influential.

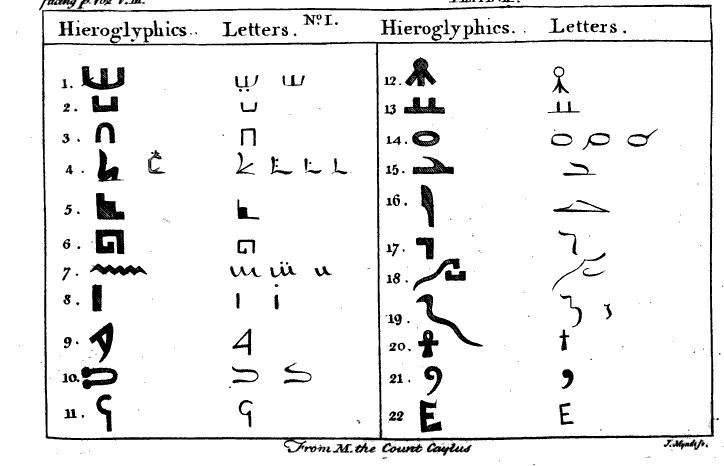
Illustration from the 1765 edition of The Divine Legation, showing the theory of the Comte de Caylus on Egyptian hieroglyphics.

A modern opinion, from J. G. A. Pocock, is that the book is a "strange and flawed work of undisciplined genius".

== Reception timeline ==
- 1738 First part published.
- 1738 Warburton publishes a Vindication to an anonymous attack (by William Webster).
- 1741 Second part published.
- 1743 Reply from Thomas Bott. Thomas Chubb in An Enquiry Concerning Redemption hit back at some comments of Warburton's.
- 1744 The section dealing with the origin of language is translated into French by Léonard de Malpeines, as Essai sur les hiéroglyphes des Égyptiens. Warburton issues the first part of a two-part reply to critics, to Conyers Middleton, Richard Pococke, Richard Grey; and also Mark Akenside, John Tillard, Julius Bate and Nicholas Mann.
- 1745 Warburton issues the second part of his reply to Arthur Ashley Sykes and Henry Stebbing.
- 1751 A German translation begins publication, and is reviewed by Gotthold Ephraim Lessing.
- 1766 In an anonymous work, Robert Lowth takes issue with Warburton, over a 1765 addition to the Divine Legation (appendix to book 5) concerning the Book of Job.
- 1770 Edward Gibbon attacks Warburton's interpretation of Æneid book VI.
