= Burr Oak Township =

Burr Oak Township may refer to:

- Burr Oak Township, Mitchell County, Iowa
- Burr Oak Township, Winneshiek County, Iowa, in Winneshiek County, Iowa
- Burr Oak Township, Doniphan County, Kansas
- Burr Oak Township, Jewell County, Kansas
- Burr Oak Township, Michigan
- Burr Oak Township, Lincoln County, Missouri
- Burr Oak Township, Beadle County, South Dakota, in Beadle County, South Dakota
