= Robert Wallace Nevin =

English surgeon

Robert Wallace Nevin (1907 - 20 December 1980) was an English surgeon.

== Life ==
Born in Burton-on-Trent to a general practitioner and his wife, he studied at Clifton College, Emmanuel College, Cambridge and from 1929 to 1933 St Thomas's Hospital Medical School. He joined the Royal Army Medical Corps on the outbreak of the Second World War and was evacuated from Dunkirk before serving in the Middle East and Yugoslavia. He joined St Thomas's Hospital's surgical staff on demob and remained there for the rest of his life, becoming dean of its medical school from 1957 to 1967.

He married Audrey Spencer Leeson, daughter of Spencer Leeson, Bishop of Peterborough. He was also examiner at Oxford, Cambridge, London and Glasgow universities and at the Royal College of Surgeons of England and during 1947 Hunterian Professor. From 1957 to 1978 he was Chief Surgeon of the Metropolitan Police.

Police appointments
Preceded by Isaac Jones	Chief Surgeon of the Metropolitan Police; 1957-1978	Succeeded by Edward Charles Arden Bott
