= Thomas Bott =

Church of England clergyman (1688–1754)

Thomas Bott (1688–1754) was an English cleric of the Church of England, known as a controversialist.

== Life ==
Born at Derby, Bott was the son of a mercer; his grandfather had been a major in the parliamentary army. He was trained for the dissenting ministry. He was a Presbyterian minister at Spalding; but then, after some experience of preaching, he went to London to study medicine.

Bott subsequently took Anglican orders, being ordained deacon in York by William Dawes in November 1722, and priest in August 1723, in Norwich. He obtained the rectory of Whinburgh in Norfolk, through Lord Macclesfield's interest. In 1725 he was also given the living of Reymerston. He was awarded a Cambridge M.A. in 1728, Comitia Regia.

According to the Oxford Dictionary of National Biography, in 1734 Francis Long gave Bott the rectory of Spixworth, Norfolk, but there is doubt over the date. Francis Blomefield states that John Longe, the incumbent there, died in 1739. The CCEd database makes Bott rector from 1729, the year in which Longe died. He held Spixworth, with the neighbouring parish of Crostwick, for the rest of his life.

Bott in 1746 was made rector of Hardwick, Norfolk, presented by Frances Bacon. In 1747 Rebecca Harbord presented him to the living of Edgefield, Norfolk, in gratitude for his hindering an unacceptable marriage in the family.

Bott's health broke in 1750, and he died 23 September 1751 at Norwich. He was a Whig in politics, a follower of Benjamin Hoadly, and a friend of Samuel Clarke.

== Works ==
Bott was a proponent of ethical rationalism. In 1724 he published a discourse to prove that "peace and happiness in this world" was "the immediate design of Christianity"; and a defence of this work followed in 1730. In 1725 he attacked William Wollaston's personal way of deducing morality from truth, in an anonymous work The principal and peculiar notion advanc'd in a late book, intitled, The religion of nature delineated; consider'd and refuted; he is considered, however, to have misinterpreted Wollaston, as an anonymous opponent pointed out. In 1730 he published a sermon, Morality founded in the Reason of Things, and the Ground of Revelation.

In 1738 Bott preached a sermon, on 30 January (anniversary of the execution of Charles I), on the duty of doing as we would be done by. He observed by the way that if both parties had fulfilled this duty, Charles would not have lost his head. In the same year he attacked Joseph Butler's Analogy, as the pseudonymous Philanthropus, in Remarks upon Dr. Butler's sixth chapter of the Analogy of Religion. The criticism has been taken as from an "extreme libertarian" stance, but not of any substance.

In 1743 Bott published his major work, An Answer to the Rev. Mr. Warburton's Divine Legation. He criticised William Warburton's Divine Legation of Moses, for making morality dependent on the command of a superior being.

== Family ==
In 1739 Bott married Rebecca, daughter of Edmund Britiffe, of Hanworth, Norfolk. He left one son, Edmund Bott, afterwards of Christchurch, Hampshire, who was an alumnus of Trinity College, Cambridge, and 'author of a valuable Work on the Poor Laws'.

== Notes ==
Attribution

This article incorporates text from a publication now in the public domain: Stephen, Leslie, ed. (1886). "Bott, Thomas (1688-1754)". Dictionary of National Biography. Vol. 5. London: Smith, Elder & Co.
