= Essai sur les hiéroglyphes des Égyptiens =

French translation of an English book

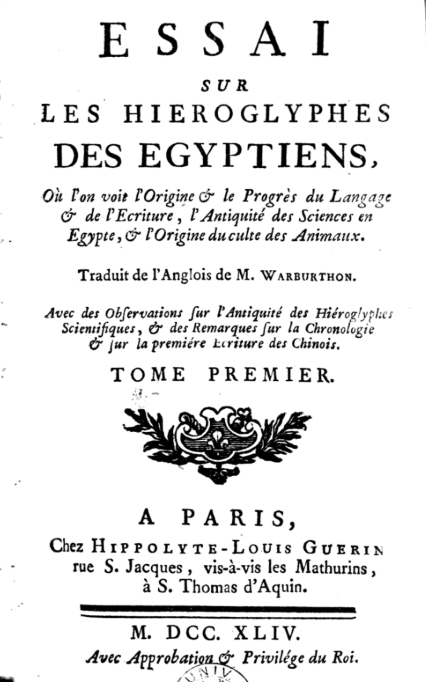
Essai sur les Hieroglyphes des Egyptiens, 1744

Essai sur les hiéroglyphes des Égyptiens was a significant 1744 French translation of an English work on the history of writing.

== Content ==
The Essai translated a section (book IV of volume 2) of The Divine Legation of Moses (from 1737) by William Warburton, thought by the original author to have value independent of his main religious thesis. The work of de Malpeines, the translator, appeared under the longer title Essai sur Les hiéroglyphes des Égyptiens, où l'on voit l'origine et le progrès du langage et de l'écriture, l'antiquité des sciences en Égypte, et l'origine du culte des animaux. It was based on 140 pages of the original work of Warburton, which in all ran to over 1000 pages. Those pages are the part of the work that is now most remembered.

The book as published also contained a work of Nicolas Fréret, "Remarques sur la chronologie et sur la première écriture des Chinois". The notes to Essai itself discussed the views of Warburton and Samuel Shuckford on Chinese characters.

== Translator ==
Marc-Antoine Léonard de Malpeines (or des Malpeines) (1700–1768) was a French lawyer. He is known mainly for his 1744 translation and adaptation, the Essai.

== Influence ==
Condillac's Essai sur l'origine des connaissances humaines (1746) was influenced by the Essai. The major influences in his Traité des systèmes were the Essai, and the Histoire des oracles of Fontenelle. He carried over verbatim the Essai's explanation of the transition from painting to hieroglyphic writing. Diderot's Lettre sur les sourds-et- muets (1751) was also influenced by the Essai. Warburton's theory on the origin of language in metaphor was taken up by the Encyclopédie group, and Rousseau. Rousseau mentions Warburton in The Social Contract.

== Modern edition ==
In 1978 an edition of the Essai by Patrick Tort was published, in a volume including an introduction by Jacques Derrida. Derrida's contribution, Scribble, was then separately translated into English, in 1979.
