= Bolt On Technology =

- Type: B2B software company
- Industry: Software, automotive aftermarket
- Headquarters: Southampton, Pennsylvania, U.S.
- Area served: North America
- Products: Automotive aftermarket software
- Parent: Performant Capital

Bolt On Technology is an American business-to-business software development company based in Southampton, Pennsylvania that designs, develops and sells add-on software for the automotive aftermarket industry in North America.

== History ==
Bolt On Technology develops software to equip automotive repair and maintenance shops with tools that improve customer communication and streamline their day-to-day operations.

Mitchell 1, an affiliate of Snap-On tools, licensed three of Bolt On Technology's software products in 2011, branded them as their own, and began selling them across North America. The following year, Mitchell 1 sold close to 1,000 units of the bundled software package. Today, auto repair shops throughout the U.S., Canada, and Guam use these modules.

In the fall of 2013, they released Mobile Manager Pro, which features digital vehicle inspections, that can photograph, upload and share details of repairs and inspections via text message reports to customers. Mobile Manager Pro went through several updates and was re-launched in the summer of 2014. Welcome Station Kiosk was released in mid-2014. Similar to kiosks used in restaurants, grocery stores, and airports, the check-in tool lets repair shop customers select vehicle services, as well as update their contact and vehicle information.

In 2017, Review Manager was introduced, a tool that lets shops regulate and respond to customer reviews. The company also introduced Bolt On University that same year, a training program that teaches impactful business practices and how to use the company's software to its full potential. The training program teaches automotive shop owners how the software works and why it's essential to driving success for repair shops. The sessions, held in markets around the country, provide shop owners with the opportunity to network with other shops to share best practices and successes.

In 2021, Bolt On Technology was purchased by Performant Capital, a private equity firm that owns other automotive-related SaaS companies like MyShopManager and Unotify.
