= Old Library Building (Chattanooga, Tennessee) =

- U.S. National Register of Historic Places
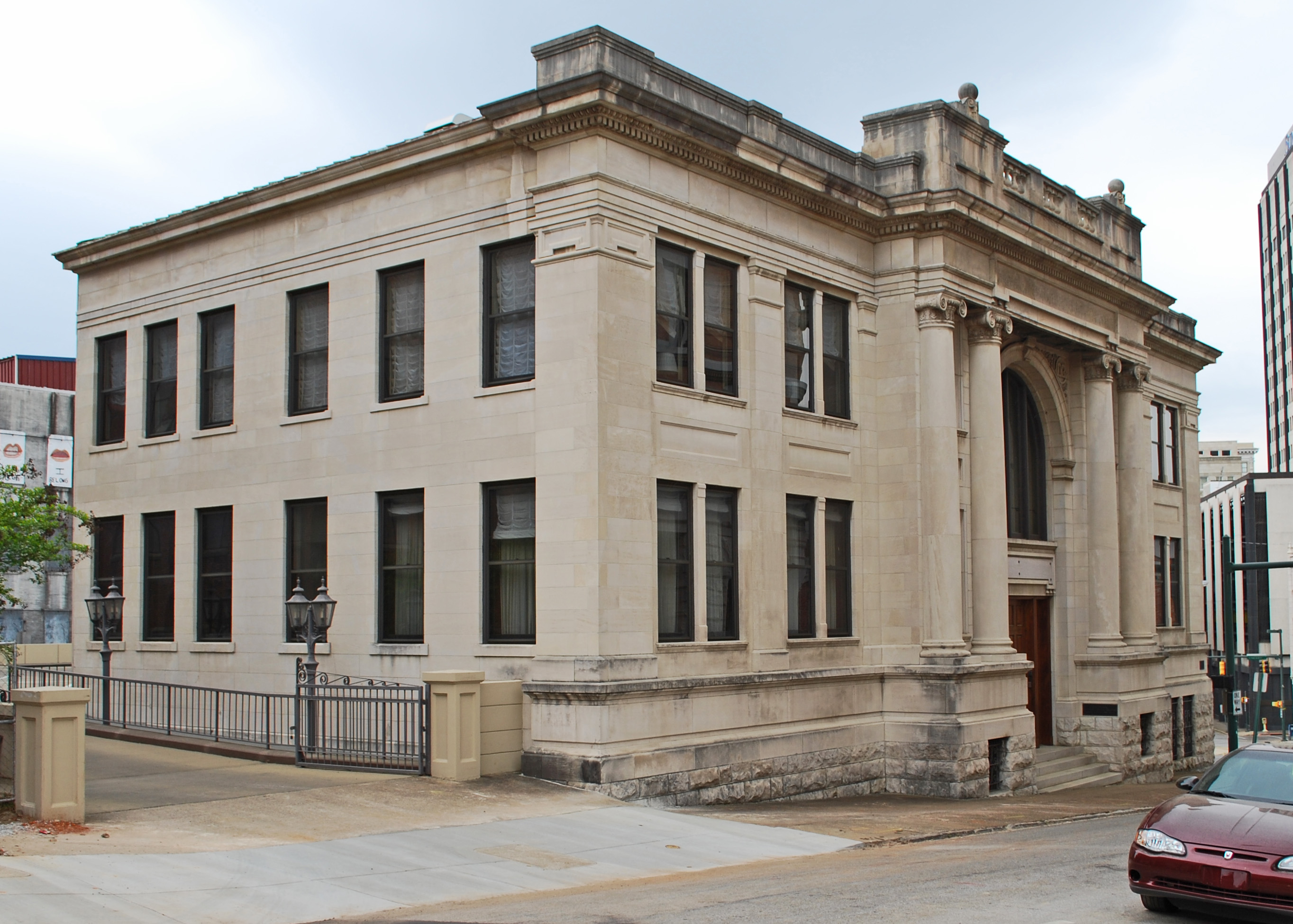

- Location within Tennessee Location within the United States
- Location: 200 E. 8th St., Chattanooga, Tennessee
- Coordinates: 35°2′48″N 85°18′26″W
- Area: less than one acre
- Built: 1904
- Architect: Hunt, Reuben Harrison
- Architectural style: Classical Revival
- MPS: Hunt, Reuben H., Buildings in Hamilton County TR (AD)
- NRHP reference No.: 73001776
- Added to NRHP: March 14, 1973

The Old Library Building at 200 E. 8th St. in Chattanooga, Tennessee is a Carnegie library building which was built in 1904. It was listed on the National Register of Historic Places in 1973.

It was designed by architect Reuben Harrison Hunt in Classical Revival style.

It was the first building specifically designed as a library in Chattanooga, although there has been a library in the city since 1867. It was built with a $50,000 Carnegie grant.

It was part of the Chattanooga Public Library system.
