= Isaac Jones (magistrate) =

Welsh magistrate (c. 1782-1865)

Sheriff of Carmarthen
- In office 4 October 1817 – 4 October 1818

Sheriff of Carmarthen
- In office 4 October 1830 – 4 October 1831

Personal details
- Born: c. 1782 Carmarthen, Wales
- Died: 29 May 1865 (aged 82–83) Carmarthen, Wales

Isaac Jones (c. 1782 – 29 May 1865) was a Welsh magistrate who was twice Sheriff of Carmarthen from 1817 to 1818 and 1830 to 1831 and governor of Carmarthen County Gaol from 1844 to 1847.

== Career ==
A burgess of the borough of Carmarthen, Jones was nominated to be Sheriff of Carmarthen on 4 October 1817 alongside James James. He was appointed as such and served the office for one year. On 4 October 1830, Jones was again nominated and appointed Sheriff of Carmarthen, but was spared being subjected to the ceremony of beating burgesses that was customary. He served the office for one year.

In February 1844, the Sheriff of Carmarthen recommended Jones to fill the role of governor of Carmarthen County Gaol, the previous governor having entrusted the keeping of the gaol to his son, who was accused of seducing and impregnating a female prisoner. Jones was appointed governor on 25 June 1844 with Rev. Thomas Williams as chaplain of the gaol. He served until 1847.
