= Maurice Cassidy =

British medical doctor

Sir Maurice Cassidy GCVO CB
- Born: 29 February 1880; Lancaster, England
- Died: 22 October 1949 (aged 69); London, England
- Education: Lancaster Royal Grammar School; Clare College, Cambridge

Sir Maurice Alan Cassidy GCVO CB (29 February 1880 – 22 October 1949) was a British medical doctor, physician to the King from 1937 until his own death.

Cassidy was born the eldest son of David McKay Cassidy, a doctor at the Lancaster Mental Hospital in Lancashire and was educated at Lancaster Royal Grammar School and Clare College, Cambridge. He then entered St Thomas' Hospital in London as a medical student, qualifying M.B. in 1906 and M.D. in 1909.

After working there for several years, including two as resident assistant registrar, he was elected in 1913 a fellow of the Royal College of Surgeons and joined the honorary staff of St Thomas'. In 1914 he delivered the Goulstonian Lecture to the College of Surgeons on the subject of rheumatoid arthritis.

During the First World War he spent two years in a Calais hospital, where he contracted pulmonary tuberculosis and had to be repatriated. In addition to his commitments at St Thomas' he was for some time Physician and Chief Medical Officer of the Metropolitan Police and was knighted C.B. on his retirement from the post in 1929.

Although he had withdrawn from active duty at St Thomas' prior to the Second World War he nevertheless returned to duty for the duration of the war, retiring finally in 1945. He delivered the Harveian Oration to the Royal College of Physicians in 1946 on the subject of coronary disease. From 1946 to 1948 he served as president of the Royal Society of Medicine.

In 1930 he had been appointed physician to the royal household, and later physician in ordinary to both King George V and King George VI. He was created first K.C.V.O. and then G.C.V.O.

He died at his home in London in 1949 following a car accident. He had been married to Elsie, daughter of Frederick Relfe but left no children.

Police appointments
Preceded by Charles Alfred Ballance	Physician and Chief Medical Officer of the Metropolitan Police; 1926–1929	Succeeded by Isaac Jones
