= Burr Oak Township, Lincoln County, Missouri =

Township in Missouri, United States

Coordinates: 39.0662414°N 90.7653901°W

Burr Oak Township is an inactive township in Lincoln County, in the U.S. state of Missouri.

Burr Oak Township was established in 1875, and named for the burr oak timber within its borders.
