= Timothy Botts =

American artist

Cover of Book by Timothy Botts with sample of his calligraphy

Timothy Botts is an artist who has a focus of calligraphy. He was born in Pennsylvania and currently resides in Glen Ellyn, Illinois. He is well known for his transformation of Bible verses into pieces art.

== Early life ==
Botts is married and has three children. As a child, Botts felt like an outcast, until he had gotten inspiration to try art. This inspiration was from his first-grade teacher. She recognized his artistic ability and continued as his art teacher throughout his elementary years and followed him into high school. During his sixth-grade year, Botts had to do a poster project for school fair. For his project, he used a lettering book that had all different lettering styles that piqued his interest. In the following year, Botts attended junior high where he met his future wife. The two dated through high school and went separate ways before going off to college.

After attending high school, he was attended Carnegie Mellon University to pursue his art. During his freshman year at Carnegie Mellon, he was introduced to calligraphy as a requirement for his graphic design major.

After college, Botts married. Rather than being drafted to Vietnam, the couple were sent to Japan for three years where they taught conversational English and where Botts took Japanese brush writing for five weeks.

== Career ==
Throughout his career, Botts has formed his own font, or what he refers to as a visual language with the use of colors, letter styles, letter paths, and contrast and repetition. He used a mixture of Runes styled calligraphy as well as ancient African scripts he came across from some research of Saki Mafundikwa. He also included 19th century American adaptations of Black Letter, Roundhand, early 20th century Bookhand, as well as urban graffiti.

Botts has had many opportunities to draw on walls of churches and other places that inhabit places of worship with selected murals of scriptures that can be found at Good Shepard Lutheran, Cornerstone Church, Naperville Bible Church, Trinity Church of the Nazarene, St. Francis House High School in Wheaton and Advocate Good Samaritan Hospital in Downers Grove. His art can be found in many formats other than walls which can be found in provided publishings.

His teaching can be found at the College of DuPage and an intermediate class at The Fine Line in St. Charles, Illinois. He hosts weekend workshops throughout the United States as well as at the International Calligraphy Convention.

== Published works ==
- (1989). Wind Songs. Tyndale House Publishers. ISBN 9780842382526
- (1991). Messiah. Tyndale House Publishers. ISBN 9780842342353
- (1992). Horizons: Exploring Creations. Zondervan. ISBN 978-0310576709
- (1994). Proverbs. Tyndale House Publishers. ISBN 978-0842350341
- (1996). Joy in the Journey. Tyndale House Publishers. ISBN 978-0785277897
- (1997). The Book of Psalms. Tyndale House Publishers. ISBN 978-0842349550
- (1998). Door Posts. Tyndale House Publishers. ISBN 978-0842305952
- (1999). Best- Loved Bible Verses. Tyndale House Publishers. ISBN 978-0842335225
- (2000). The Holy Bible. Tyndale House Publishers. ISBN 978-0842337144
- (2002). Portraits of the Word: Great Verses of the Bible in Expressive Calligraphy. Tyndale House Publishers. ISBN 978-0842355353
- (2011). Bound for Glory. Tyndale House Publishers. ISBN 978-1414354538

== Awards ==
- The Purchase Award, Newberry Library (2000).
