= Isaac Jones (physician) =

Australian physician (c. 1883-1957)

Isaac Jones (c. 1883 – 1957) was an Australian physician.

== Life ==
Originating in Bendigo, he began his career at Melbourne Hospital and came to the United Kingdom before the First World War. During the conflict he served in the Royal Australian Army Medical Corps at a major London military hospital, remaining in the Corps after the end of hostilities.

On leaving the army he joined the teaching staff at St Thomas's Hospital Medical School, as well as working for the Special Operations Executive at 64 Baker Street during the Second World War. He also became Physician and Chief Medical Officer of the Metropolitan Police from 1929 to 1957. He died in office at St Thomas's Hospital after being taken ill at a D Division dinner on Bryanston Street.

Police appointments
Preceded by Maurice Cassidy	Physician and Chief Medical Officer of the Metropolitan Police; 1929-1957	Succeeded by Robert Wallace Nevin
