= John Trussell =

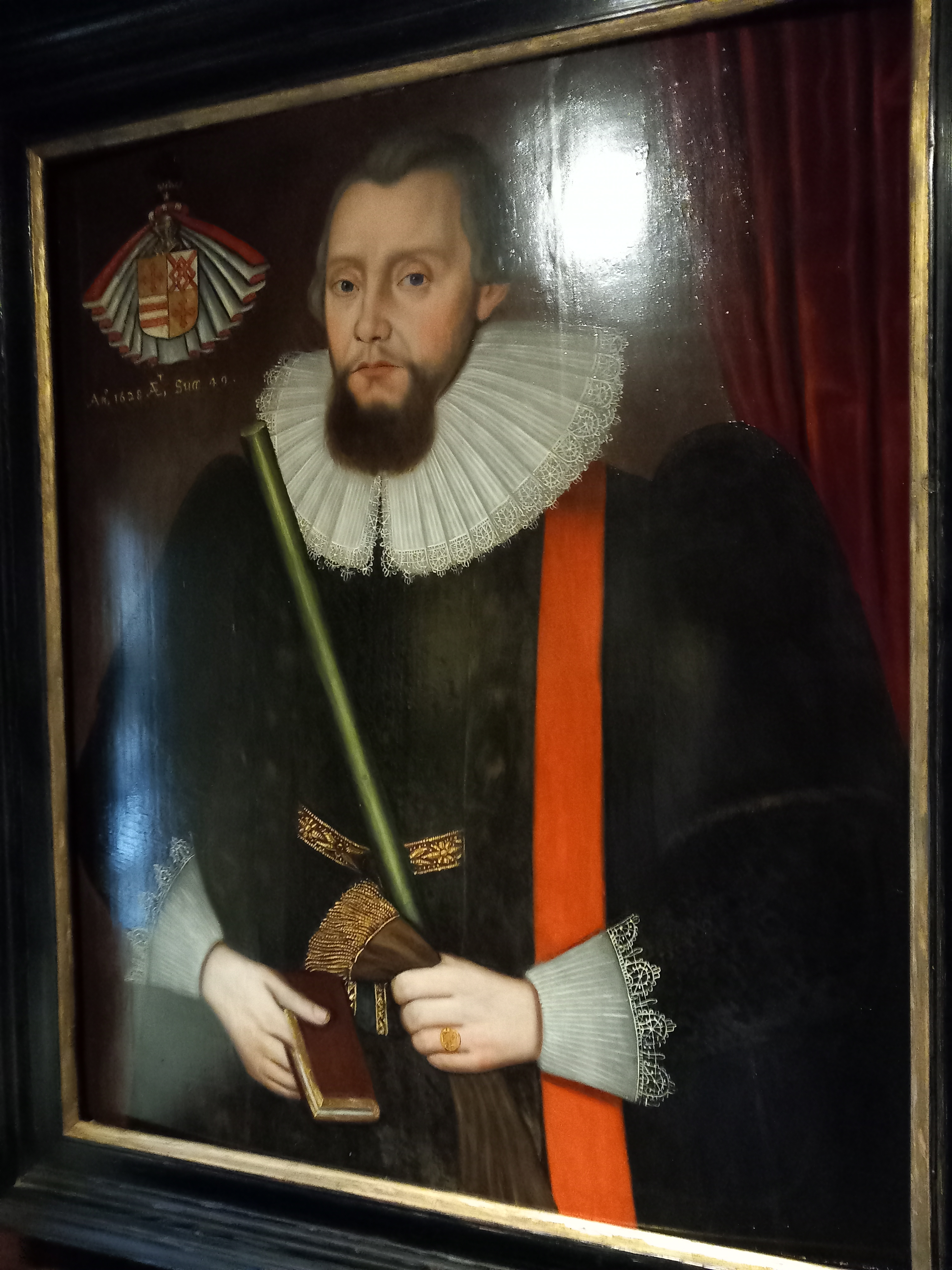

John Trussell (c. 1575 – 1648) was an English historical writer.

== Life ==
The elder of the two sons of Henry Trussell by his wife Sarah Kettlewood, he was baptised in London in 1575); his family's background was at Billesley, Warwickshire. He was in business in Winchester, and took part in municipal politics. He became alderman of the city, and served as mayor in 1624 and again in 1633.

== Works ==
In 1636 Trussell published A Continuation of the Collection of the History of England, extending the history of Samuel Daniel to fill the gap from Edward III to Henry VII. Unlike typical chroniclers, he gave little space to ceremonies, wonders and floods.

Working on the history of Winchester, Trussell completed in 1642 a manuscript Touchstone of Tradition, whereby the certaintie of occurrences in this kingdom and elsewhere, before characters or letters were invented, is found out. The work consists of five books, the second of which is dedicated to Walter Curll, bishop of Winchester, and the fourth to Thomas Wriothesley, 4th Earl of Southampton; it contains lists of the notables of Winchester, and accounts of local occurrences and antiquities. but it was largely used in A Description of Winchester (1750) and the History and Antiquities of Winchester (1773). The manuscript was among those in the library of Sir Thomas Mostyn, 4th Baronet by 1744, and was purchased by Winchester city council in 1974.

Trussell also contributed, with Michael Drayton and others, to the Annalia Dubrensia (1636) edited by Robert Dover.

== Family ==
Trussell married Elizabeth Collis, widow of Gratian Patten, and left three daughters.

== Notes ==
Attribution

This article incorporates text from a publication now in the public domain: Lee, Sidney, ed. (1899). "Trussell, John". Dictionary of National Biography. Vol. 57. London: Smith, Elder & Co.
