= Sheriff of Carmarthen =

Sheriff of Carmarthen Town, Wales

The Sheriff of Carmarthen is a ceremonial position in the town of Carmarthen, Wales. The position formerly had significant judicial responsibilities, but gradually lost those functions. The post was created in 1604 when the town was given the right to appoint its own two sheriffs, making it a county corporate, independent from the jurisdiction of the Sheriff of Carmarthenshire. The Municipal Corporations Act 1835 led to the number of sheriffs in Carmarthen being reduced from two to one.

In 2017 Carmarthen Town Council hosted the annual meeting of the National Sheriff’s Association of the Cities and Towns of England and Wales.

Carmarthen is one of only two towns in Wales that have a Town Sheriff, the other being Haverfordwest.

== List of town sheriffs ==
- 1984 Malcolm Morgan Jones
- 1985 Lawrence Victor Rice
- 1986 Agnes Maria Dunbar
- 1987 Richard John Williams
- 1988 Peter Hughes Griffiths
- 1989 John Elfed Williams
- 1990 Thomas James Hurley
- 1991 Richard john Goodridge
- 1992 June Williams
- 1993 Kenneth Bryan Maynard
- 1994 Douglas Edmund Ynyr Richards Rose
- 1995 William Gwynoro Jones
- 1996 Margaret Elizabeth Evans
- 1997 Nia Rhiannon Griffith
- 1998 Douglas Edmund Ynyr Richards Rose
- 1999 Llyr Hughes Griffiths
- 2000 William Gwynoro Jones
- 2001 Mary Kathleen Davies
- 2002 Nerys Mair Defis
- 2003 Aled Prys Williams
- 2004 Philip Grice
- 2005 D. Jonathan Edwards
- 2006 Alan Speake
- 2007 Kennethe Lloyd
- 2008 Alan Speake
- 2009 Reverend Tom Talog Defis
- 2010 Philip Grice
- 2011 Alun Lenny
- 2012 Arwell Lloyd
- 2013 Diarmait Mac Giolla Chriost
- 2014 Wyn Thomas
- 2015 Dorothy Bere
- 2016 Emlyn Schiavone
- 2017 Phil Grice
- 2018 Angharad Jones Leefe
- 2019 Miriam Moules
- 2020 Wyn Thomas
- 2021 Wyn Thomas
- 2022 Emlyn Schiavone
- 2023 Heledd ap Gwynfor
