= Edward Charles Arden Bott =

British physician

Edward Bott CBE FRCP
- Born: Edward Charles Arden Bott; 7 September 1924
- Died: 1 April 2005 (aged 80)
- Education: Harrow School; Trinity Hall, Cambridge

Edward Charles Arden Bott CBE FRCP (7 September 1924 – 1 April 2005) was a British physician, best known as the last Chief Surgeon of the Metropolitan Police.

== Life ==
He studied at Harrow School, Trinity Hall, Cambridge and St Thomas's Hospital Medical School. On qualifying he served on Cyprus during his national service before returning to take his MRCP at St Thomas's, joining Roger Bevan's general practice in central London and in 1955 succeeding Bevan as Westminster School's medical officer. Time as John Richardson's personal physician between qualifying and Cyprus led to close contact with the security services and politicians, as well as becoming Chief Medical Officer of the Metropolitan Police from 1977 to 1992, at the end of which role he was appointed a CBE.

Police appointments
Preceded by Robert Wallace Nevin	Chief Surgeon of the Metropolitan Police; 1978-1992	Succeeded by Position Abolished
