= Henry Stebbing =

English archdeacon and controversialist (1687–1763)

Henry Stebbing (1687–1763) was an English churchman and controversialist, who became archdeacon of Wilts.

== Life ==
Baptised at Walton, Suffolk on 19 August 1687, he was the fourth son of John Stebbing (1647–1728), a grocer of Walton, by his wife Mary (died 1721), daughter and coheiress of Richard Kenington. Henry entered St Catharine Hall, Cambridge, as a sizar on 24 February 1705, graduating B.A. in 1708, M.A. in 1712, and D.D. in 1730. On 19 October 1710 he was elected a fellow, and on 27 June 1738 was incorporated at Oxford.

On Lady day 1713 he resigned his fellowship on being presented to the parish of Lower Rickinghall in Suffolk, and on 31 May 1726 he was instituted rector of Garboldisham in Norfolk. On 14 July 1731 he was elected preacher to the Society of Gray's Inn, and in the following year was appointed chaplain in ordinary to the king. On 19 July 1735 he was installed archdeacon of Wilts, and in 1739 became chancellor of Sarum. In 1748 he became rector of Redenhall in Norfolk, and retained the charge for the rest of his life. He died at Gray's Inn on 2 January 1763, and was buried in Salisbury Cathedral, where a monument was erected to his memory. His portrait, painted in 1757 by Joseph Highmore, hangs in the National Portrait Gallery, London.

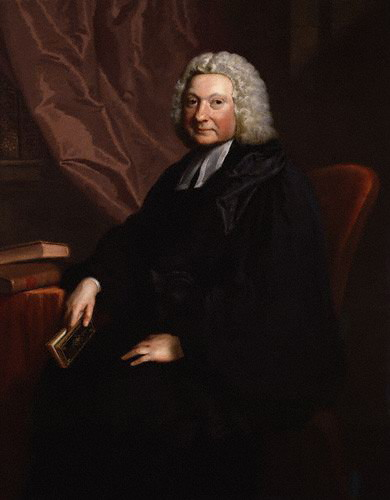
Henry Stebbing, 1757 portrait by Joseph Highmore.

== Works ==
Stebbing was known by contemporaries as a champion of Church of England orthodoxy. Among others he wrote against George Whitefield and Benjamin Hoadly, bishop of Bangor. His chief antagonist, however, was William Warburton, with whom he carried on a dispute for many years. Its origin was Stebbing's attack on Warburton's Divine Legation of Moses.

Stebbing's major works were:

- ‘A Rational Enquiry into the proper methods of supporting Christianity, so far as it concerns the Governors of the Church,’ London, 1720.
- ‘An Essay concerning Civil Government, considered as it stands related to Religion,’ London, 1724; reprinted in ‘The Churchman armed against the Errors of the Times,’ vol. iii., London, 1814.
- ‘An Apology for the Clergy of the Church of England,’ London, 1734.
- ‘A Brief Account of Prayer and the Sacrament of the Lord's Supper, and other religious duties appertaining to Christian Worship,’ London, 1739; 4th edit. 1771.
- ‘A Caution against Religious Delusion,’ London, 1739; this work, against the Methodists, ran through six editions within a year.
- ‘Christianity justified upon the Scripture Foundation,’ London, 1750. Boyle Lectures.
- ‘Sermons on Practical Christianity,’ London, 1759–60.

A collected edition of his earlier writings appeared in 1737, entitled ‘The Works of Henry Stebbing,’ London. He has also been credited with an anonymous satire entitled ‘The Fragment,’ published at Cambridge in 1751, which assailed several leading statesmen and ecclesiastics of the time.

== Death ==
Translation of the Latin inscription on the memorial to Henry Stebbing in Salisbury Cathedral;

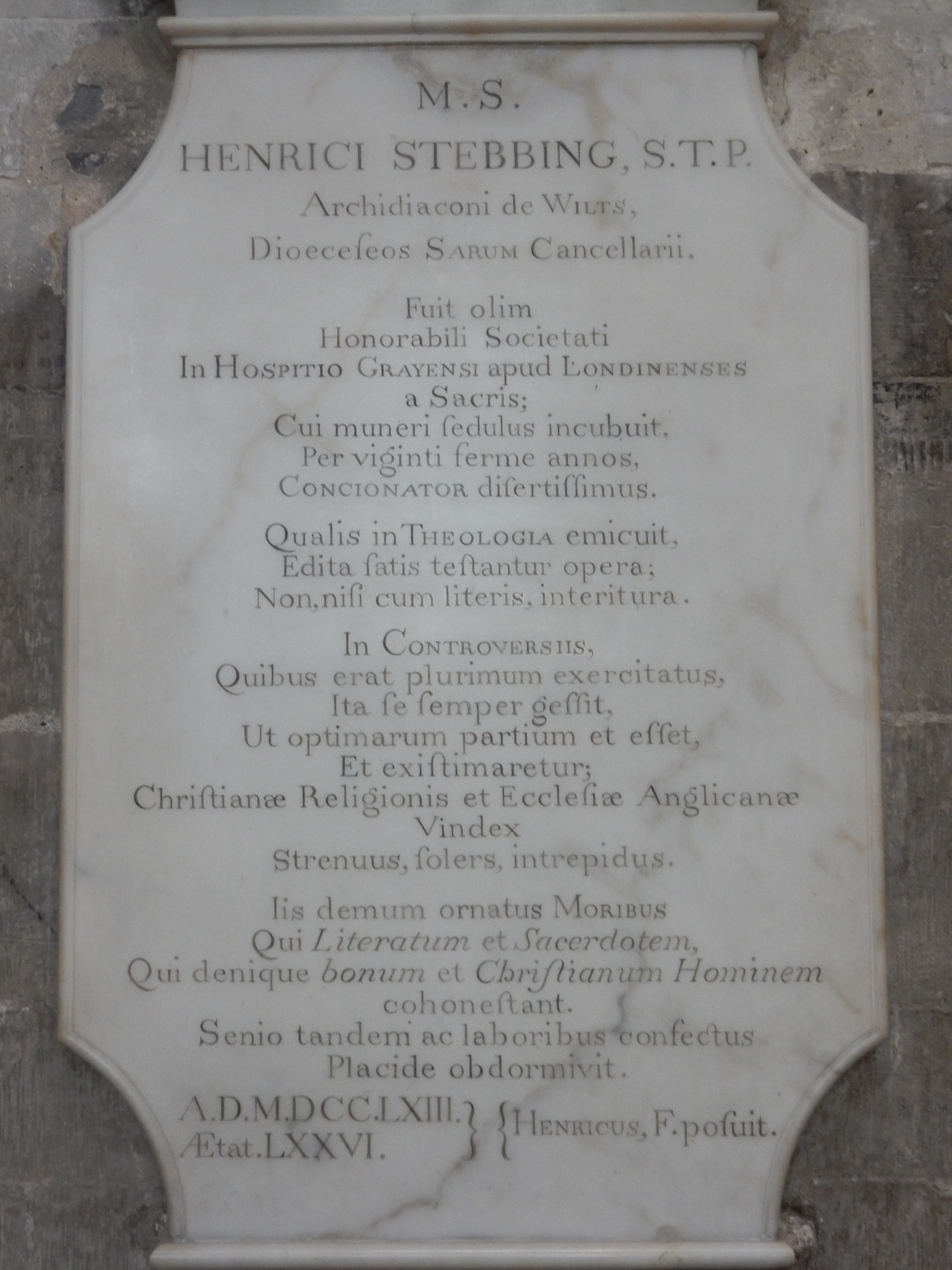
Henry Stebbing Memorial from Salisbury Cathedral

Sacred to the memory of HENRY STEBBING S.T.P, Archdeacon of Wiltshire, Chancellor of the Diocese of SALISBURY.

He was formally one of the Consecrated of the Honourable Society, in Gray's Inn in London, to which duty he diligently devoted himself for almost twenty years as a most skilful Orator.

His published works, not about to perish unless with literature, bear witness to how prominent he was in Theology.

In Controversies, in which he was very well practiced, he always conducted himself in such a manner that he both was, and was thought of the best company, a vigorous, accomplished, intrepid Defender of the Christian Religion and the Anglican Church.

At last, distinguished by those Qualities that honour a Learned man and a Priest and indeed a good and Christian Man, finally, weakened by the feebleness of age and by his labours, he fell peacefully asleep in the Year of Our Lord 1763, at the age of 76.

Henry F placed this.

== Family ==
By his wife, a daughter of Robert Camel of Eye, Suffolk, Stebbing had a son, Henry Stebbing (1716–1787), a fellow of St. Catharine Hall, who became in 1749 rector of Gimingham and Trunch in Norfolk, and, on the resignation of his father in 1750, was appointed preacher to the Society of Gray's Inn. He died at Gray's Inn on 13 November 1787. He was the author of a collection of ‘Sermons on Practical Subjects,’ London, 1788–90, published by his son, Henry Stebbing, a barrister, with a memoir.

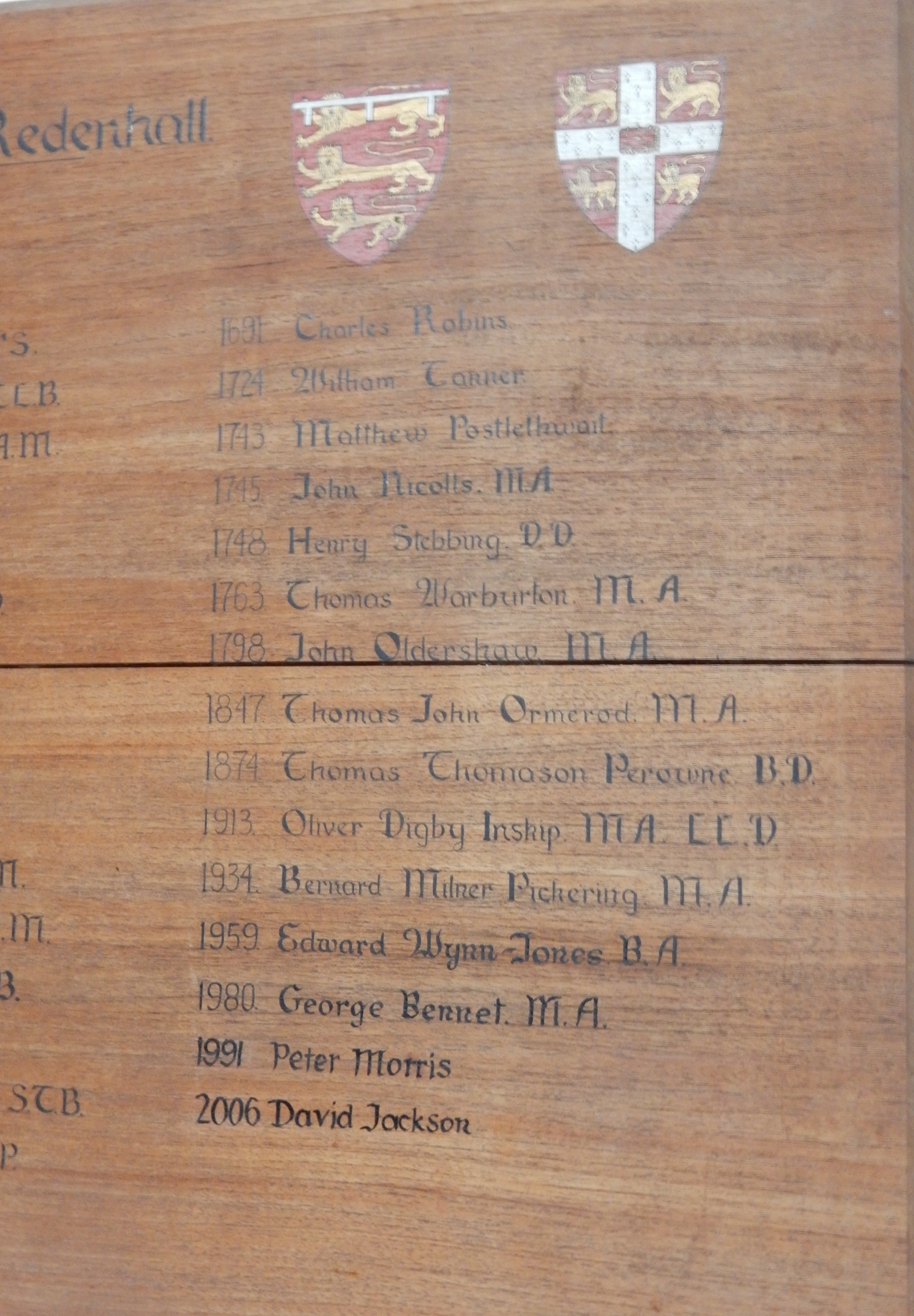
List of Rectors Redenhall Church - Henry Stebbing 1748

== Notes ==
Attribution

This article incorporates text from a publication now in the public domain: "Stebbing, Henry (1687-1763)". Dictionary of National Biography. London: Smith, Elder & Co. 1885–1900.
