= Bot (caste) =

Hindu caste found in Uttar Pradesh, India

The Bot are a Hindu caste found in the state of Uttar Pradesh in India. They are distinct from the Bhotiya ethnic group of the Indian Terai, although they too claim a Nepali origin, like the Bhotiya.

The community is said to have gotten its name from the fact that they are descended from the king of Botwal, a state that once existed in Nepal. They are said to have immigrated to what is now the Bahraich District of Uttar Pradesh in 1775. The community claim to be Raghuvanshi Rajputs, a claim not accepted by neighbouring Rajput groups. They are a small community, found mainly in twenty villages of Bahraich District Jarwal block (Harrajpur, Dusarapara, Sakhouta, Gour, Katka, Lalpur Jagdishpur (Botanpurwa), Fakharpur, Kaiserganj, and Huzurpur blocks . The community now speaks Awadhi, and have customs similar to neighbouring Hindu communities.

The Bot are strictly endogamous, but do not marry within the village. They occupy their own villages, very rarely sharing them with any other caste. Land is their main economic source, and they are community of cultivators. Of their main crops, they grow paddy and maize in the winter, and wheat and pulses in the summer. Each of their settlement contains an informal caste council, known as a biradari panchayat. These biradari panchayats are headed by chaudhary, the village headman. The panchayat acts as instrument of social control, dealing with issues such as divorce and adultery.

== See also ==
- Tharu people
