= Valerie Bott =

Museum consultant and historian (born 1948)

Valerie Bott FSA MBE

Academic work
- Discipline: History
- Institutions: UCL; William Hogarth Trust

Valerie Bott FSA MBE (born December 1948) is a British museum consultant and historian.

== Career ==
She chairs the William Hogarth Trust. Bott, who lives in London, was appointed MBE in the 2014 Birthday Honours for services to heritage and conservation. She was elected as a Fellow of the Society of Antiquaries of London on 27 February 2020.
