= Margaret Glen Bott =

British surgeon (1891–1969)

Margaret Stote Glen Bott OBE (1891–1969) was a physician and a city councillor, who worked in Nottingham and was the first woman surgeon at the Nottingham Women's Hospital.

== Training ==
Born in Bolton in 1891, Glen Bott was the youngest of six children – her father Alexander was a clergyman and her mother's name was Mina Stote. Glen Bott moved to Nottingham in 1916, where she was employed at the Nottingham General Hospital nursing injured soldiers from WW1, and she lived at 2 Newcastle Circus in The Park Estate, Nottingham. Glen Bott trained at the London School of Medicine for Women, now the Royal Free Hospital School of Medicine, where she qualified with the Conjoint Diploma in 1915, as degrees were not then awarded in England for women training in medicine. In 2025, the Nottingham Women's History Group organised a crowd-funder for a plaque on her house in Nottingham.

== Professional life ==
In 1919 Glen Bott set up her own practice in Nottingham and became the first woman surgeon at the Nottingham Women's Hospital, 29–31 Castle Gate, Nottingham and she was also an assistant surgeon at the Nottingham Children's Hospital (NWHG). In trade directories for 1920,1922 she was listed as a surgeon at 9 Wellington Circus, Nottingham. Glen Bott lived at 15 Regent Street, Nottingham in 1925 and 1939. After nearly 20 years specialising in gynaecological work she was recognised through election to Fellow of the Royal College of Obstetricians and Gynaecologists (FRCOG). Alongside her medical work in 1937, Glen Bott was appointed as a city magistrate.

== Civic duty ==
During WW2 Glen Bott was co-opted onto the Nottingham City Council, a choice later ratified by the citizens at the first post-war election and she served as a Conservative city councillor for Mapperley Ward from 1939–1958, was elected an Alderman in1956. Marking the Festival of Britain, Glen Bott, as Municipal Vice-President, opened 'A Festival Exhibition of local scenes' which was exhibited from 17 September to 6 October 1951.

== Margaret Glen Bott School ==
The Margaret Glen Bott School – a secondary school in Wollaton Park, Nottingham was named after Glen Bott in 1955 (closed 2004). The foreword for the official opening of the school contains a quote about Dr Glen Bott, "continues the Nottingham Education Committee's policy of inviting persons who have rendered distinguished service to the City and its children. Her forty years of hospital work as a specialist devoted to the welfare of the mothers and children of the City and seventeen years of service on the City council, particularly on the Education, Health and Art Galleries and Museums Committees".

== Personal life ==
Glen Bott was keenly interested in the arts and the theatre, sports, country life and gardening, she had also been a county badminton player and played golf and fished. Glen Bott said in the Nottingham Guardian, "Nottingham has been so kind to me. It gave me my first chance and also the chance to set up in specialised work. I love the City and I think it is very beautiful." Glen Bott received an OBE in 1961 for her political service to the city, and received it at Buckingham Palace, with her niece, Angela Woods and great-niece Christine Woods in attendance. Her medal was firstly given to her friend, who then presented it to Nottingham's Castle Museum for "which she did so much". Glen Bott retired in 1968 and died the following year.
