= Mitchell 1 =

American software company for auto shops

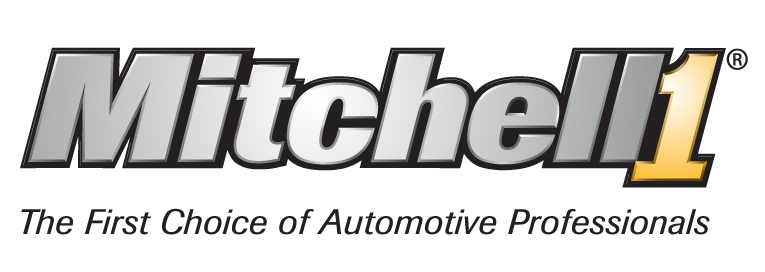
- Type: Private
- Industry: Automotive aftermarket
- Founded: 1918
- Headquarters: 4S Ranch, California, United States
- Key people: Dave Ellingen (President)
- Website: mitchell1.com

Mitchell 1 is an American company that produces software for automobile repair shops. Founded in 1918, the company started as a private book publisher and service engineering company. It provided the first specifications and diagrams of vehicle electrical systems for both automotive technicians, and the general public. The company is headquartered in Poway, California, and its ownership is currently held by Snap-on Tools, Inc. (85%) and NAPA (15%).

Mitchell 1 and the National Institute for Automotive Service Excellence are sponsors of the ASE Technician of the Year award. In August 2009, the North American Council of Automotive Teachers (NACAT) recognized Mitchell 1 with the 2009 Friends of NACAT Award.
