= Burr Oak Township, Doniphan County, Kansas =

Burr Oak Township
- Township
- Location in Doniphan County
- Coordinates: 39°50′54″N 094°58′11″W
- Country: United States
- State: Kansas
- County: Doniphan

Area
  - Total: 32.20 sq mi (83.39 km^{2})
  - Land: 31.32 sq mi (81.11 km^{2})
  - Water: 0.88 sq mi (2.28 km^{2}) 2.73%
- Elevation: 965 ft (294 m)

Population (2020)
  - Total: 188
  - Density: 6.00/sq mi (2.32/km^{2})
- GNIS feature ID: 472815

Burr Oak Township is a township in Doniphan County, Kansas, United States. As of the 2020 census, its population was 188.

== Geography ==
Burr Oak Township covers an area of 32.2 square miles (83 km^{2}) and contains no incorporated settlements. According to the USGS, it contains four cemeteries: Columbus, Jackson, Moskau and Old Home.

The stream of Smith Creek runs through this township.
