= Nicholas Mann (antiquarian) =

- Born: Tewkesbury, United Kingdom
- Died: 1753
- Education: King's College, Cambridge
- Occupation: Antiquary

Nicholas Mann (died 1753) was an English antiquary and Master of the Charterhouse.

== Life ==
A native of Tewkesbury, he proceeded in 1699 from Eton College to King's College, Cambridge, of which he was elected fellow, and graduated B.A. in 1703, M.A. in 1707. At college he was tutor to the Marquis of Blandford, but afterwards became an assistant-master at Eton, and then one of the clerks in the secretary's office under Lord Townshend.

He travelled in France and Italy, and on his return was appointed king's waiter at the custom house, and keeper of the standing wardrobe at Windsor. Through the interest of the Marlborough family he was elected master of the Charterhouse on 19 August 1737. At his institution he is said to have shocked the Archbishop of Canterbury by professing himself an Arian. He was elected a Fellow of the Royal Society in 1738 and was appointed a vice-president of the society in 1751.

He died at Bath, Somerset on 24 November 1753, and was buried in the piazza at the Charterhouse, having some years before affixed his own epitaph over the chapel door. By will he bequeathed his library and collection of manuscripts, excepting those of his own composition, to Eton College. Books from Mann’s bequest survive in the library of Eton College, where individual volumes carry a label recording his donation in 1754.

== Works ==
Mann wrote:

- Of the True Years of the Birth and of the Death of Christ; two Chronological Dissertations, London, 1733 (Latin version, with additions, 1742 and 1752).
- Critical Notes on some passages of Scripture (anon.), London, 1747.

Richard Gough had in his possession a copy of Thomas Gale's Antonini Iter, profusely annotated by Mann.
