= William Warburton =

English writer and critic (1698–1779)

The Right Reverend William Warburton
- Bishop of Gloucester
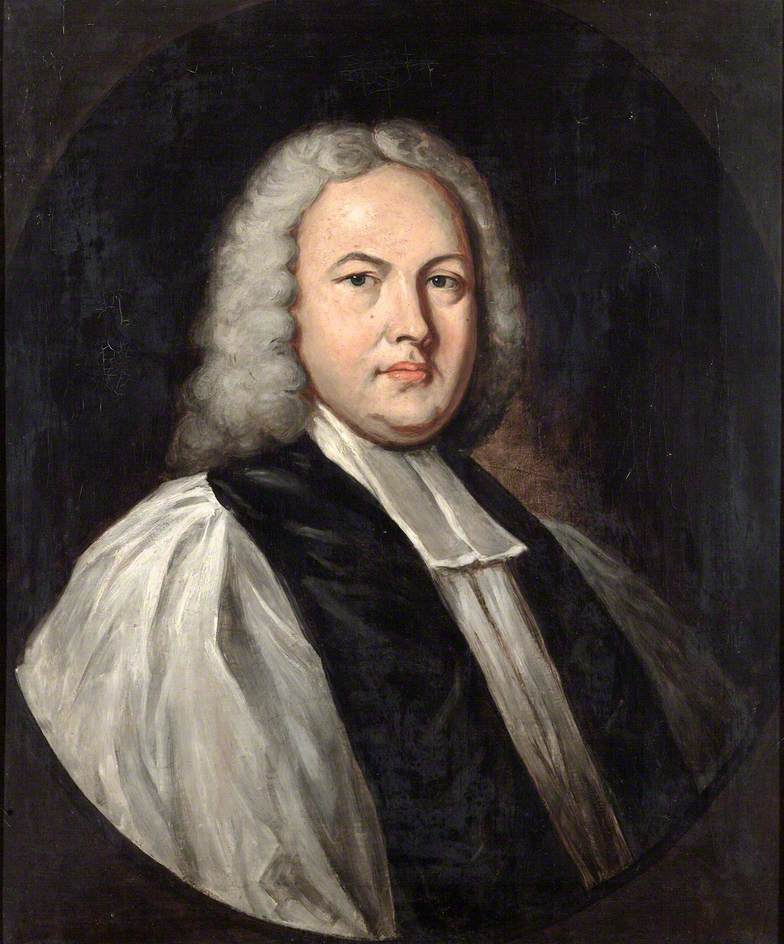
- Diocese: Diocese of Gloucester
- In office: 1759–1779
- Predecessor: James Johnson
- Successor: James Yorke
- Other post: Dean of Bristol (1757–1760)

Personal details
- Born: 24 December 1698 Newark-on-Trent, Nottinghamshire, England
- Died: 7 June 1779 (aged 80) Gloucester, Gloucestershire, England
- Denomination: Anglican

William Warburton (24 December 1698 – 7 June 1779) was an English writer, literary critic and churchman, Bishop of Gloucester from 1759 until his death. He edited editions of the works of his friend Alexander Pope, and of William Shakespeare.

== Life ==
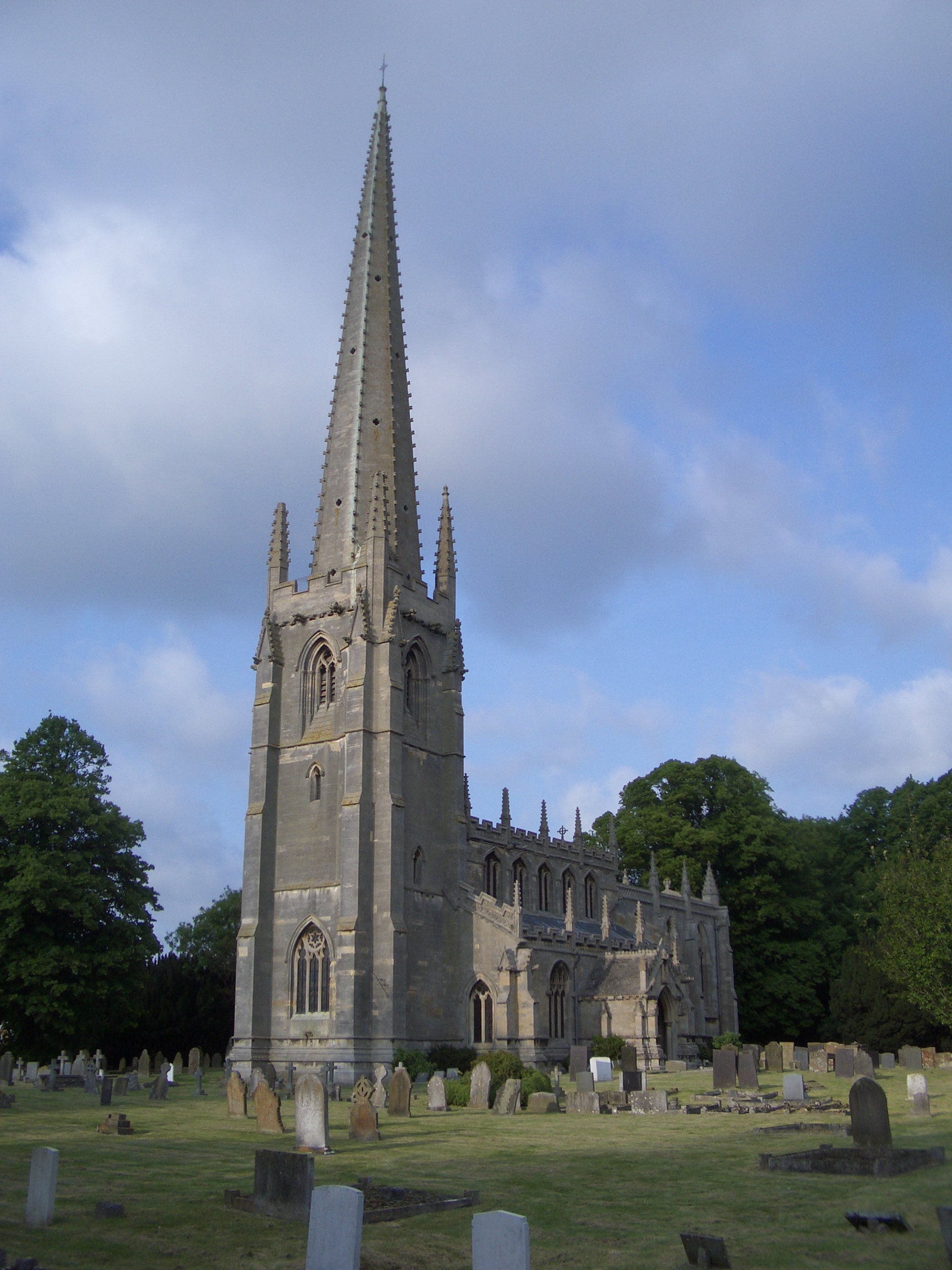
St Helen's church at Brant Broughton, where Warburton was rector from 1727

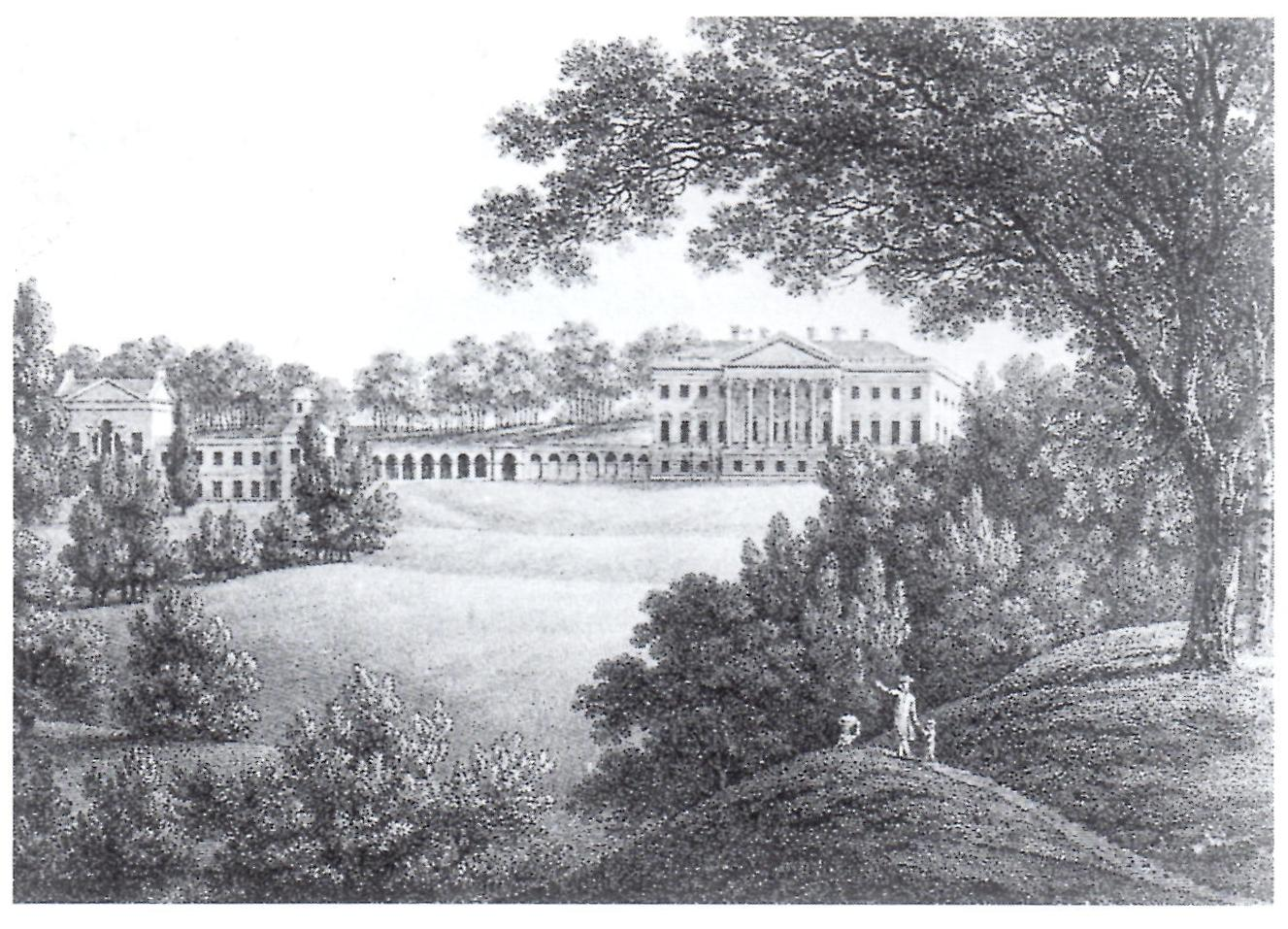
Prior Park, Warburton's home from 1745

Warburton was born on 24 December 1698 at Newark, Nottinghamshire, where his father, George Warburton, was town clerk. He was educated at Oakham and Newark grammar schools, and in 1714, he was articled to Mr Kirke, an attorney, at East Markham. In 1719, after serving his articles he returned to Newark, where he began to practise as a solicitor, but, having studied Latin and Greek, changed his mind and was ordained deacon by the Archbishop of York in 1723. He was ordained as a priest in 1726, and in the same year began to associate with literary circles in London.

Sir Robert Sutton gave Warburton the small living of Greasley, in Nottinghamshire, exchanged next year for that of Brant Broughton in Lincolnshire. He was, in addition, rector of Firsby from 1730 until 1756, although he never lived in the village. In 1728, he was made an honorary M.A. of the University of Cambridge.

At Brant Broughton for 18 years, he spent his time in study, the first result of which was his treatise on the Alliance between Church and State (1736). The book brought Warburton into favour at court, and he probably only missed immediate preferment by the death of Queen Caroline.

A series of articles defending the writings of Alexander Pope against charges of religious unorthodoxy, led to a friendship with the poet which contributed greatly to Warburton's social advancement. Pope introduced him to both William Murray, later Lord Mansfield, who obtained for him the preachership of Lincoln's Inn in 1746, and to Ralph Allen, who, in Dr Johnson's words, "gave him his niece and his estate, and, by consequence, a bishopric." Warburton married Gertrude Tucker in September 1745, and from that time lived at Allen's estate at Prior Park, in Gloucestershire, which he eventually inherited in 1764.

He became prebendary of Gloucester in 1753, chaplain to the king in 1754, prebendary of Durham in 1755, Dean of Bristol in 1757, and Bishop of Gloucester in 1759.

== Literary works ==
By 1727, Warburton had written the notes he contributed to Lewis Theobald's edition of Shakespeare, published a Critical and Philosophical Enquiry into the Causes of Miracles, and contributed anonymously to a pamphlet on the jurisdiction of the Court of Chancery, The Legal Judicature in Chancery stated (1727). This was an answer to another anonymous pamphlet, written by Philip Yorke, later Lord Chancellor.

=== The Divine Legation ===
After Alliance between Church and State, his next and best-known work, Divine Legation of Moses demonstrated on the Principles of a Religious Deist (1738–41, in two volumes), preserves his name as the author of the most daring and ingenious of theological paradoxes. The deists had made the absence of any inculcation of the doctrine of a future life an objection to the divine authority of the Mosaic writings. Warburton boldly admitted the fact and turned it against the adversary by maintaining that no merely human legislator would have omitted such a sanction of morality. Warburton's extraordinary power, learning and originality were acknowledged on all sides, though he excited censure and suspicion by his tenderness to the alleged heresies of Conyers Middleton. The book aroused much controversy. In a pamphlet of "Remarks" (1742), he replied to John Tillard, and Remarks on Several Occasional Reflections (1744–45) was an answer to Akenside, Conyers Middleton (who had been his friend), Richard Pococke, Nicholas Mann, Richard Grey, Henry Stebbing and other critics. As he characterised his opponents in general as the "pestilent herd of libertine scribblers with which the island is overrun," it is no surprise that the publication of the book created many bitter enemies.

The "Divine Legation" gained a second reception in the 20th century through the writings of Jacques Derrida and John Milbank

=== Defence of Pope ===
Either in quest of paradox, or unable to recognise the real tendencies of Alexander Pope's Essay on Man, Warburton defended it against the Examen of Jean Pierre de Crousaz through a series of articles he contributed to The Works of the Learned in 1738–9. Whether Pope had really understood the tendency of his own work has always been doubtful, but there is no question that he was glad of an apologist, and that in the long run Warburton's jeu d'esprit helped Pope more than all his erudition. This led to a sincere friendship between the two men, with Pope fostering Warburton as a literary collaborator and editor. As part of this effort, in a 1743 edition of the Dunciad published under Warburton's editorship, Pope persuaded Warburton to add a fourth book, and encouraged the substitution of Colley Cibber for Theobald as the "hero" of the poem. On his death in 1744, Pope's will bequeathed half of his library to Warburton, as well as the copyright to all his printed works. Warburton would subsequently publish a full edition of Pope's writings in 1751.

=== Edition of Shakespeare ===
In 1747 his edition of Shakespeare was published, incorporating material from Pope's earlier edition. He had previously entrusted notes and emendations on Shakespeare to Sir Thomas Hanmer, whose unauthorised use of them led to a heated controversy. He also accused Lewis Theobald, with whom he had corresponded on Shakespearean subjects as early as 1727, of stealing his ideas, and denied his critical ability.

=== Later works ===
Warburton was further kept busy by replying to the attacks on his Divine Legation from all quarters, by a dispute with Bolingbroke respecting Pope's behaviour in the affair of Bolingbroke's Patriot King, and by a vindication in 1750 of the alleged miraculous interruption of the rebuilding of the temple of Jerusalem undertaken by Julian, in answer to Conyers Middleton. According to the Encyclopædia Britannica Eleventh Edition, "Warburton's manner of dealing with opponents was both insolent and rancorous, but it did him no disservice."

He continued to write for as long as the infirmities of age allowed, collecting and publishing his sermons, and attempting to complete the Divine Legation, further fragments of which were published with his posthumous Works. He wrote a defence of revealed religion in his View of Lord Bolingbroke's Philosophy (1754), and Hume's Natural History of Religion called forth some Remarks ... by a gentleman of Cambridge (1757) from Warburton, in which his friend and biographer, Richard Hurd, had a share.

In 1762 he launched a vigorous attack on Methodism under the title of The Doctrine of Grace. He also engaged in a keen controversy with Robert Lowth, later bishop of London, on the book of Job, in which Lowth brought home charges of lack of scholarship and of insolence that admitted of no denial. His last important act was to found in 1768 the Warburtonian lecture at Lincoln's Inn, "to prove the truth of revealed religion ... from the completion of the prophecies of the Old and New Testament which relate to the Christian Church, especially to the apostasy of Papal Rome."

== Death ==
Warburton died at Gloucester on 7 June 1779. He left no children, his only son having predeceased him. In 1781 his widow, Gertrude, married the Rev. Martin Stafford Smith.

== Posthumous publications and biographies ==
His works were edited in seven volumes (1788) by Richard Hurd with a biographical preface, and the correspondence between the two friends—an important contribution to the literary history of the period—was edited by Samuel Parr in 1808. Warburton's life was also written by John Selby Watson in 1863, and Mark Pattison made him the subject of an essay in 1889.

== Arms ==
Coat of arms of William Warburton
Notes Impaled with the arms of the Diocese of Gloucester. Escutcheon Argent a chevron between three cormorants Sable a canton Gules.

== See also ==
- List of abolitionist forerunners
- Shakespeare's editors

== Notes ==
Church of England titles
Preceded by Thomas Chamberlayne	Dean of Bristol; 1757–1760	Succeeded by Samuel Squire
Preceded by James Johnson	Bishop of Gloucester; 1759–1779	Succeeded by James Yorke
