= Guglielmo Amedeo Lori =

Italian painter (1869–1913)

Guglielmo Amedeo Lori (1869–1913) was an Italian painter of landscapes in a Divisionist style.

He was born in Pisa, but in Lucca he met Antonio Discovolo, and joined him at Giacomo Puccini's villa at Torre del Lago during 1898–99: where he met other artists such as Plinio Nomellini, Raffaello Gambogi, and Francesco Fanelli. Through 1902–03, he painted alongside Discovolo and Lloyd in Liguria. He exhibited often in Genoa and Florence. In 1902, he sent works to the In arte libertas exhibition in Rome, and in 1904, to the Secession exhibition held at the Palazzo Corsini in Florence, and the Rome Secession Exhibition in 1913. He exhibited at the Venice Biennale from 1901 to 1910. He died in Viareggio, near Lucca. At the fourth International Exposition of Venice, he was noted among the other young landscape artists Giuseppe Viner and Galileo Chini; and in 1907, at the seventh International Exposition of Venice, he was featured alongside other contemporary Tuscan painters including Tito Lessi and Antonio Salvetti.
