= Vyner =

Vyner is a surname and may refer to:

- Frederick Grantham Viner, dedicatee of William Burges
- Margaret Vyner (1914–1993), Australian film actress
- Michael Vyner (1943–1989), English arts administrator
- Reginald Vyner (1839–1870), British Liberal Party politician
- Sir Robert Vyner, 1st Baronet (1631–1688), Lord Mayor of London 1674
- Robert Vyner (1686–1777), Member of Parliament (MP) for Great Grimsby 1710–1713, and for Lincolnshire 1724–1761
- Robert Vyner (1717–1799), MP for Okehampton 1754–1761, for Lincoln 1774–1784
- Robert Vyner (1762-1810), MP for Lincolnshire 1794–1802
- Sir Thomas Vyner, 1st Baronet (1588–1665), Lord Mayor of London in 1653
- Thomas Vyner (MP) (1666–1707), MP for Great Grimsby 1699–1701
- Thomas Vyner (priest) (1629–1673), Canon of Windsor and Dean of Gloucester Cathedral
- Zak Vyner (born 1997), English footballer

== See also ==
- Viner, another surname
