= Thomas Vyner =

Thomas Vyner may refer to:

- Sir Thomas Vyner, 1st Baronet (1588–1665), Lord Mayor of London in 1653
- Thomas Vyner (MP) (1666–1707), MP for Great Grimsby 1699–1701
- Thomas Vyner (priest) (died 1673), Canon of Windsor and Dean of Gloucester Cathedral

== See also ==
- Vyner (disambiguation)
