= Henry Heron (MP) =

English landowner and politician

Henry Heron (1675–1730), of Cressy Hall, Lincolnshire, and St. James, Westminster, was an English landowner and politician who sat in the House of Commons from 1713 to 1727.

Heron was the eldest surviving son of Sir Henry Heron of Cressy Hall and his wife Dorothy Long, daughter of Sir James Long, 2nd Baronet of Draycot Cerne, Wiltshire. In 1695, he succeeded his father. He married Abigail Heveningham, daughter of Sir William Heveningham of Ketteringham, Norfolk on 12 February 1696. He was High Sheriff of Norfolk for the year 1708 to 1709.

Heron was elected as a Tory Member of Parliament (MP) for Boston at the 1713 general election. He was returned there unopposed at the 1715 general election. At the 1722 general election he was returned unopposed as MP for Lincolnshire. In 1723 he became Recorder of Boston. He did not stand at the 1727 general election.

Heron died on 10 September 1730, aged 55. He and his wife had two daughters and a son who died without issue.

Parliament of Great Britain
Preceded by William Cotesworth; Richard Wynn	Member of Parliament for Boston; 1713–1722; With: Richard Wynn 1713-1719; Richard Ellys 1719-1722	Succeeded by Henry Pacey; Richard Ellys
Preceded by Sir William Massingberd, Bt; Sir John Brownlow, Bt	Member of Parliament for Lincolnshire; 1722–1727; With: Sir William Massingberd, Bt 1722-1724; Robert Vyner 1724-1727	Succeeded by Robert Vyner; Sir Thomas Lumley Saunderson
