= Joseph Banks (Grimsby MP) =

English lawyer, financial speculator and politician

Joseph Banks (6 September 1665 – 27 September 1727), of Revesby Abbey, Lincolnshire, was an English lawyer, financial speculator and politician who sat in the House of Commons from 1715 to 1727.

Banks was the second son of Robert Banks of Beck Hall, Giggleswick, Yorkshire and his wife Margaret Frankland, daughter of John Frankland of Rathmell, Yorkshire. He was articled to a solicitor. He married, Mary Hancock, the daughter of Rev. Rowland Hancock, a dissenting minister of Shircliffe Hall, near Sheffield, in 1689. At some time, he moved to live as a country attorney at Scofton, Nottinghamshire, where he was steward of the manors for Lady Mary Howard of Worksop. He was also agent for the Dukes of Leeds, Norfolk and Newcastle. He made a fortune and bought up estates in Nottinghamshire, and Lincolnshire where in 1711 he bought Revesby Abbey from Henry Howard, 11th Earl of Suffolk.

At the 1715 general election Banks stood for Parliament at Great Grimsby where his opponent, being in debt, had promised to repay his creditors after he won. Banks pointed out that if his opponent won, he could claim privilege and default, and so offered to pay the notes of credit himself. He was elected Whig member of parliament for Great Grimsby. He voted consistently with the government and his only speech was to oppose a scheme to improve navigation facilities at the rival port of Sunderland. In 1719, he bought some estates which were forfeited after the Jacobite rebellion (and which he sold back to the family later a profit), and in 1720 made a profit from South Sea Company stock before the bubble burst but avoided a penalty because, unlike his fellow MP Robert Chaplin, he had paid for them himself. At the 1722 general election he was defeated heavily at Grimsby but was returned on the Treasury interest as MP for Totnes. He did not stand at the 1727 general election. In his later days took an interest in reclamation operations at Deeping Fen in Lincolnshire.

Banks died shortly after leaving parliament on 27 September 1727. He had two children. His son Joseph Banks inherited his profitable estates and became an MP. His daughter married Sir Francis Whichcote, 3rd Baronet.

Parliament of Great Britain
Preceded by Arthur Moore; William Cotesworth	Member of Parliament for Great Grimsby; 1715–1722; With: Robert Chaplin 1715-1721; Arthur Moore 1721-1722	Succeeded by Benjamin Collyer; Charles Pelham
Preceded by Stephen Northleigh; Charles Wills	Member of Parliament for Totnes; 1722–1727; With: Charles Wills	Succeeded by Exton Sayer; Charles Wills
