= Visner =

Visner is a surname. Notable people with the surname include:

- Joe Visner (1859–1945), American baseball player
- Pe'er Visner (born 1957), Israeli politician

== See also ==
- Viner
- Visser
