= Vyner (disambiguation) =

Vyner is a surname.

Vyner may also refer to:

- Charles Vyner Brooke or Vyner of Sarawak (1874–1963), third White Rajah of Sarawak
- Vyner baronets, an extinct title in the Baronetage of England
- Vyner Street, a street in Bethnal Green, London, England

== See also ==
- Vyners School, a secondary school and specialist college in the London Borough of Hillingdon
