= Arthur Moore (Grimsby MP) =

Irish businessman, economist and Tory politician

Arthur Moore M.P. (c. 1666 – 4 May 1730), of Fetcham Park, Surrey, was an Irish businessman, economist and Tory politician who sat in the English and British House of Commons between 1695 and 1722.

== Life ==
He was said to have been born in Monaghan, about 1666. An adventurer, his background was said to have been in service.

Moore studied trade questions, made money rapidly, and at the 1695 English general election was returned to parliament Member of Parliament for Great Grimsby, in Lincolnshire. At the election of February 1700-1 general bribery prevailed there, and although Moore petitioned against the members returned he did not claim the seat, and bribery was proved in his interest. With the exception of that short parliament, he represented the borough from 1695 to 1715, and he was again elected at a by-election on 11 February 1721. At the 1722 British general election he was defeated at Grimsby and petitioned, but withdrew his claim next month. He had a house in Grimsby, and was high steward of the borough from 1714 to 1730.

Moore's name appeared in 1702 among the managers of the "united trade to the East Indies". He was a director of the South Sea Company, and was appointed comptroller of the army accounts in 1704. It was reported on 15 April 1701 that he was about to be added to George, Prince of Denmark's council on admiralty affairs. On 30 September 1710 he was made one of the lords commissioners of trade and plantations; he held this post during the remainder of the reign.

During the last years of Queen Anne he showed great skill in parliament, and was deemed highly capable. His brother Thomas Moore was made paymaster of the land forces abroad in August 1713. Moore mediated between Robert Harley, 1st Earl of Oxford and Henry St John, 1st Viscount Bolingbroke in their quarrels, but threw in his lot with the latter. In later years he supported Robert Walpole.

The articles of the treaties with France and Spain (1712) which related to commerce were mainly drawn up by Moore. He was responsible for free trade clauses, eventually cancelled, and he proposed the French commerce bill to the Commons in May 1713. This brought him hostility from Whigs in the City of London. A Whig attack on Bolingbroke through Moore, corruption and the treaties backfired on Robert Monckton and Harley when he brought it up.

In 1714 it was alleged that Moore, with others, was an interested party in the Assiento contract. On 10 June a committee was appointed by the directors of the South Sea Company to investigate charges made against Moore; in July 1714 he was censured by the Company, in relation to a clandestine trade to the prejudice of the corporation; and he was declared incapable of further employment by the company.

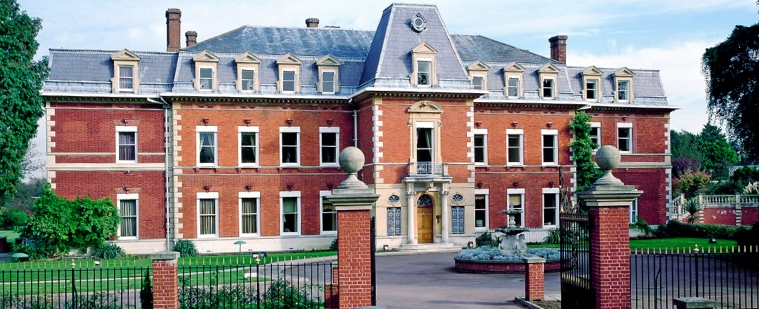
Fetcham Park House today

Moore bought property in Surrey, including Fetcham Park House, the estate of Randalls in Leatherhead, and the farm of Polesden in Great Bookham; but was profligate. His house was designed by Talman and ornamented by Louis Laguerre. He died on 4 May 1730, and was buried at Fetcham. He was sculpted by Thomas Carter.

== Family ==
Moore married at St. Bride's, London, on 17 March 1691-2, Susanna, eldest daughter of Edward Browne, by whom he had two daughters, who died in early infancy. His wife was baptised at St. Bride's 4 September 1673, died 23 February 1695, and was buried at St. Bride's on 2 March; but a monument was erected to her memory at Northfleet in Kent. He married at Westminster Abbey, on 4 November 1696, his second wife, Theophila Smythe of Epsom, daughter and heiress of William Smythe of the Inner Temple, paymaster of the band of pensioners, by Lady Elizabeth, eldest daughter of George Berkeley, 1st Earl of Berkeley. She was then aged about 20, and she lived until 1739. There were three sons and three daughters; the first son was William Moore, M.P. for Banbury. and the third was James Moore Smythe.

== Notes ==
Parliament of England
Preceded by Sir Edward Ayscough; John Chaplin	Member of Parliament for Great Grimsby; 1695–1701; With: Sir Edward Ayscough 1695-1699; Thomas Vyner 1699-1701	Succeeded by Thomas Vyner; William Cotesworth
Preceded by Thomas Vyner; 2nd seat vacant	Member of Parliament for Great Grimsby; 1701 – 1707; With: 2nd seat vacant until 1702; John Chaplin 1702–05; William Cotesworth from 1705	Succeeded by Parliament of Great Britain
Parliament of Great Britain
Preceded by Parliament of England	Member of Parliament for Great Grimsby; 1707 – 1715; With: William Cotesworth to 1710; Robert Vyner 1710–13; William Cotesworth 1713–15	Succeeded by Robert Chaplin; Joseph Banks
Preceded by Robert Chaplin; Joseph Banks	Member of Parliament for Great Grimsby; 1721–1722; With: Joseph Banks	Succeeded by Benjamin Collyer; Charles Pelham
