= Alvilde Lees-Milne =

British gardening and landscape expert (1909–1994)

- Born: Alvilde Bridges; 13 August 1909; London, England
- Died: 18 March 1994 (aged 84); Badminton, England
- Spouses: Anthony Chaplin, 3rd Viscount Chaplin (m. 1933; div. 1950) James Lees-Milne (m. 1951)
- Children: Oenone Clarissa Chaplin
- Parent(s): Tom Molesworth Bridges; Janet Florence Menzies

Alvilde Lees-Milne (née Bridges; 13 August 1909 – 18 March 1994) was a British expert in gardening and landscape design.

== Early life ==
Alvilde was born on 13 August 1909 in London. She was the only child of the Lt.-Gen. Sir (George) Tom Molesworth Bridges, the Governor of South Australia from 1922 to 1927, by his wife Janet Florence Menzies, and was the great-niece of Robert Bridges, the one-time Poet Laureate.

== Personal life ==
On 9 January 1933, Alvilde married Hon. Anthony Freskin Charles Hamby Chaplin, who would in 1949 become the 3rd Viscount Chaplin. They had one daughter, Oenone Clarissa Chaplin (1934–2021), who married Michael Charles Deane Luke (1925–2005), son of Sir Harry Charles Luke KCMG, of Hollingbourne Manor, in 1958.

While married to Lord Chaplin, she met James Lees-Milne, who became her second husband, during World War II while she was engaged in an affair with the arts patron Princess Winnaretta de Polignac. By 1949 they were in love, but from the outset the relationship was not without complications. At one point the Chaplins, Lees-Milne, and Anthony Chaplin's girlfriend Hon. Rosemary Lyttelton all lived in the same house. Lord and Lady Chaplin divorced in 1950, whereupon the viscount married Rosemary Lyttleton (by whom he later had two daughters).

She and Lees-Milne were candid with each other about their true sexual nature, and they did not generally hide their affairs from one another. During the 1930s James Lees-Milne had been the lover of Harold Nicolson, husband of the writer Vita Sackville-West who was herself noted for her high-profile lesbian affairs. Both Harold and Vita acted as witnesses at the Lees-Milnes' wedding (also present was James' former lover the composer Lennox Berkeley and Berkeley's wife Freda). Vita Sackville-West's former lover Violet Trefusis had been the long-term lover of Princess de Polignac, and in turn in the 1950s Sackville-West became involved in a love affair with Alvilde Lees-Milne (who tried to conceal the fact from her husband).

In later written accounts James Lees-Milne said that he and his wife enjoyed an active sexual relationship prior to their marriage, but less so afterwards. In 1955, Alvilde embarked on the affair with Sackville-West; they were semi-discreet but the affair was well known within their social circle. When in the late 1950s Lees-Milne began a - mostly platonic - affair with a younger man the marriage became stormy, predominantly as a result of Alvilde's jealousy (she was prone to spying on him, even to the extent of steaming open his letters and listening to his telephone conversations).

By the late 1960s, Alvilde and Lees-Milne had reached a more settled point in their marriage. They became a more devoted couple, living together but still largely pursuing separate lives.

By the 1970s, the Lees-Milnes were devoted to one another, until at the age of 70 James conceived a romantic (but platonic) relationship with a man of 25; this caused considerable strain to their marriage, and led to a permanent rift between Alvilde and Rosamond Lehmann. Alvilde became seriously ill in 1992, and Lees-Milne devoted the next two years of his life to caring for her. She died suddenly on 18 March 1994, James Lees-Milne having found her collapsed on the pathway of their Badminton home. Her death left him deeply depressed.

=== Residences ===
In 1961, Alvilde Lees-Milne purchased Alderley Grange, near the western edge of Cotswolds. The marriage survived, principally because they spent a good deal of time apart. Alvilde made a garden at Alderley which would later draw widespread admiration; she subsequently became a much sought-after garden designer, her clients including the Queen of Jordan, Valéry Giscard d'Estaing, and Mick Jagger at his manoir in France. She published a variety of best-selling books on gardening and, latterly, interiors.

In 1974, Alvilde decided that Alderley Grange was too much for them. She sold the property; the couple moved to a flat in Lansdown Crescent, Bath. It was soon realised that the place was too cramped. In 1975, they moved to the 17th-century Essex House, on the Badminton estate of the Duke of Beaufort; they rented the property at the suggestion of their close friend David Somerset, the duke's nephew and heir.

== Books ==
- The Englishwoman's Garden (Chatto & Windus, 1980) co-edited with Rosemary Verey
- The Englishman's Garden (Allen Lane, 1982) co-edited with Rosemary Verey
- The Englishwoman's House (Collins, 1984) photography by Derry Moore
- The Englishman's Room (Viking, 1986) photography by Derry Moore
- The New Englishwoman's Garden (Chatto & Windus, 1987) co-edited with Rosemary Verey, foreword by Hardy Amies
