= Wickhamford Manor =

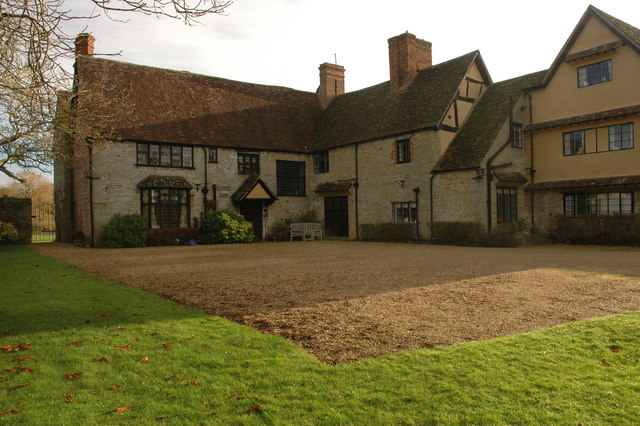
- "highly picturesque"

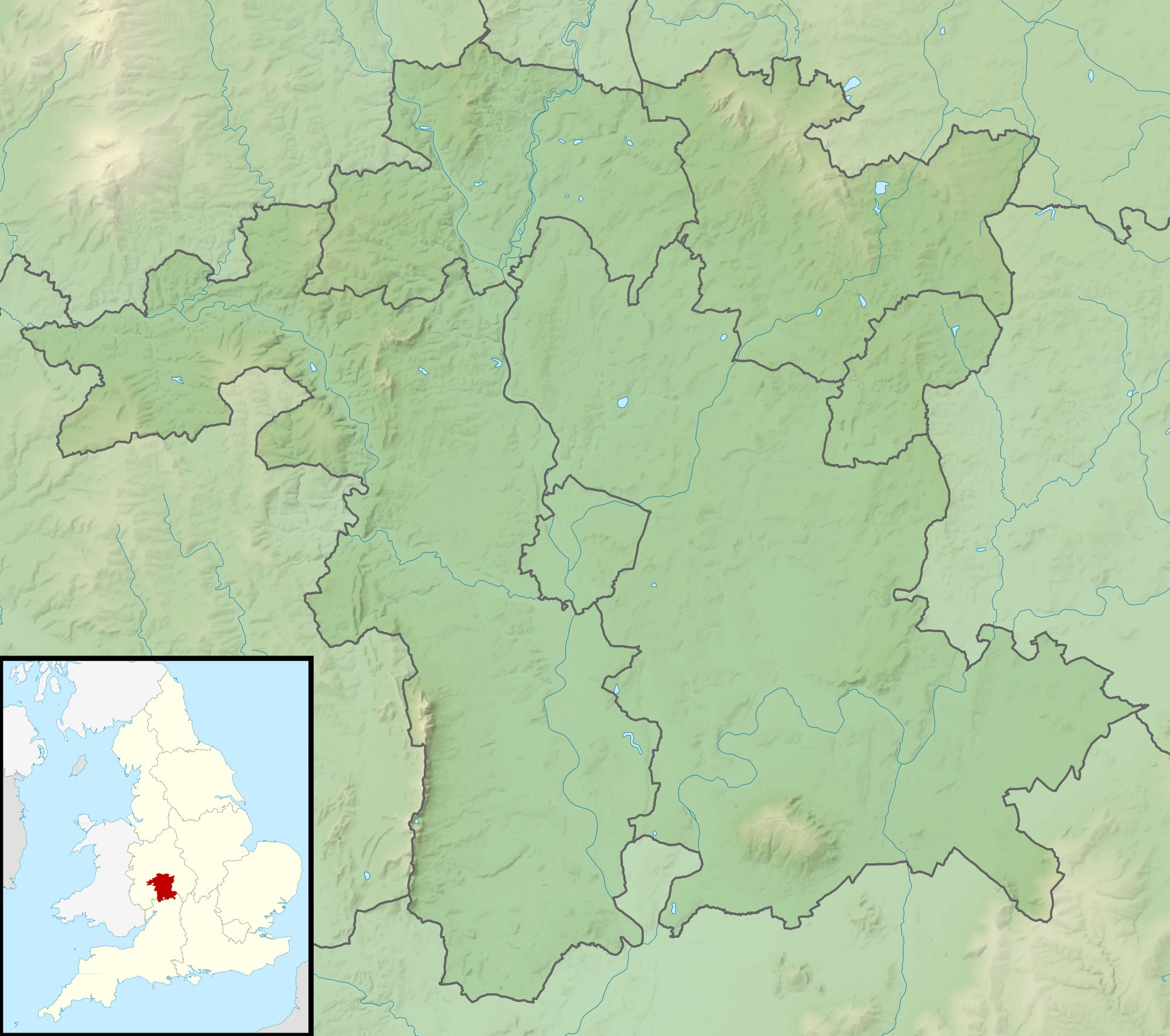
- Location within Worcestershire
- 52.0783°N 1.902°W
- Type: House
- Location: Wickhamford, Worcestershire

History
- Built: 16th century

Site notes
- Architectural style: Vernacular
- Governing body: Privately owned

Listed Building – Grade II
- Official name: Manor House, Wickhamford
- Designated: 30 July 1959
- Reference no.: 1215988

Listed Building – Grade II
- Official name: Dovecote approximately 100 m south east of Manor House
- Designated: 30 July 1959
- Reference no.: 1216194

Listed Building – Grade II
- Official name: Barn approximately 75 m south of Manor House
- Designated: 30 July 1959
- Reference no.: 1215990

Wickhamford Manor, Wickhamford, Worcestershire is a manor house dating from the 16th century. It was the childhood home of James Lees-Milne, the writer. The manor is a Grade II listed building.

== History ==
The manor was originally a monastic grange in the possession of Evesham Abbey. Following the Dissolution of the monasteries, it was granted by Elizabeth I to Thomas Throckmorton in 1562. Throckmorton sold the manor to Samuel Sandys in 1594 and the Sandys family retained ownership until 1860. Penelope Washington, daughter of a later Sandys and a distant relative of George Washington, lived at the manor in the 17th century. Her tomb in the estate church of St John the Baptist, is carved with the Washington coat of arms, three stars above two bars (or stripes), which is traditionally assumed to be the origin of the Stars and Stripes, although this is disputed.

In 1906 the manor was bought by George Lees-Milne. The Lees, and their relatives the Cromptons, were originally from Lancashire, where they had made considerable fortunes from coal mining and cotton spinning. In 1908, George's son James was born at the house. An exaggerated portrait of his parents as "a pair of ludicrous eccentrics", and his difficult relationships with them is recorded in the early chapters of his volume of autobiography, Another Self.

George Lees-Milne sold Wickhamford in 1947, two years before his death. In 2010, it was again for sale, at a guide price of £2.95 million.

== Architecture and description ==
Pevsner describes the grouping of manor house, ancillary buildings and church around a lake, originally a medieval fish pond, as "highly picturesque". The present manor buildings date from the 16th century, with later additions. It has a timber frame, infilled with limestone rubble, is of two storeys and built to an E-plan. Much is early 20th century reconstruction and expansion undertaken by George Lees-Milne. The dovecote by the lake is genuinely medieval, dating from the 13th century, and has its own Grade II listing.
