= Sir Richard Ellys, 3rd Baronet =

English Whig politician

Sir Richard Ellys (1688?–1742), of Nocton, Lincolnshire and Bolton Street, Piccadilly, Westminster, was an English Whig politician who sat in the English House of Commons and British House of Commons between 1701 and 1734. He was a bibliophile and theological writer.

== Early life ==
Ellys was the eldest son of Sir William Ellys, 2nd Baronet of Wyham and grandson of Sir Thomas Ellys, 1st Baronet (created 1660). His mother was Isabella, daughter of Richard Hampden, Chancellor of the Exchequer, and granddaughter of John Hampden. Ellys, who was born about 1688, was educated abroad, probably in Holland.

== Career ==
Ellys was elected Member of Parliament for Grantham at the second general election of 1701 and was returned unopposed in 1702. He stood aside at the 1705 general election, making way for the Marquess of Granby. He was elected as Whig MP for Boston, Lincolnshire at a by-election on 7 December 1719 and was elected again in the general elections of 1722 and 1727. Also in 1727 he succeeded his father, who died on 6 October, in the baronetcy and his estate of Nocton, Lincolnshire.

== Later life ==
Ellys held strong religious opinions. He had been an Arminian, but was a decided Calvinist in 1730, and when living in London (Bolton Street, Piccadilly) he was a member of Edmund Calamy's congregation; and after Calamy's death of Thomas Bradbury's. He maintained his family's traditional hospitality. His father had kept open house at Nocton for all comers, and every day twelve dishes were prepared whether or not any guests came; Ellys allowed £800 per year to maintain the custom.

Ellys died on 21 February 1742 and the baronetcy became extinct.

== Scholar ==
Throughout his life he corresponded with continental scholars, by whom he was much esteemed, as evidenced by Gronovius's dedication to Ellys of his edition of Ælian's Varia Historia, and the Wetsteins' edition of Johann Caspar Suicer's Thesaurus Ecclesiasticus, to which he had contributed the use of a manuscript. He was especially intimate with Michel Maittaire, who, in his Senilis, addressed several pieces of Latin verse to him.

His learning took the direction of biblical criticism and bore fruit in his Fortuita Sacra; quibus subjicitur Commentarius de Cymbalis (Rotterdam, 1727). The first part is a critical commentary in Latin on doubtful passages in the Greek Testament, and the second a treatise on cymbals, also in Latin. He befriended Thomas Boston, whose treatise on Hebrew accents, Tractatus Stigmato-logicus, was dedicated to him.

After leaving politics Ellys devoted himself to antiquarian research and amassed at Nocton a fine library. On 24 June 1742 an account of this library and some curiosities lately added to it formed the day's transactions of the Gentlemen's Society at Spalding, of which Ellys had been elected a member on 12 March 1729. Ellys's library was moved from Nocton to Blickling Hall in Norfolk.

== Family ==
Ellys was twice married: first to Elizabeth, daughter and coheiress of Sir Edwin Hussey, bart.; and, secondly, to Sarah, daughter and co-heiress of Thomas Gould, who outlived him, and, remarrying 19 December 1745 with Sir Francis Dashwood, died Lady Despencer on 19 January 1769. By neither wife, however, did he have issue, and the disposition of his property excited interest. Sir Charles Hanbury Williams, in his satire Peter and my Lord Quidam, says that the chief competitors for his inheritance were 'Horace,' i.e. Horatio Walpole who wrote a Latin ode in Ellys's honour and gave him his portrait, and Hampden, i.e. Richard Hampden, who had married Ellys's sister. On the death of Ellys it was found that his estates were entailed on his second wife, and after her death or marriage on the families of Hobart and Trevor, in to whose possession they ultimately passed. His cousin, William Strode of Barnington, Somerset, was heir-at-law and contested the will in the Court of Chancery; but without effect.

Parliament of England
Preceded by Thomas Baptist Manners; Sir William Ellys	Member of Parliament for Grantham; 1701–1705; With: Sir William Ellys	Succeeded by Marquess of Granby; Sir William Ellys
Parliament of Great Britain
Preceded by Henry Heron; Richard Wynn	Member of Parliament for Boston; 1719–1734; With: Henry Heron; Henry Pacey; The Lord Coleraine	Succeeded by Albemarle Bertie; Richard Fydell
Baronetage of England
Preceded by William Ellys	Baronet (of Wyham); 1727–1742	Extinct
