= Sir Robert Chaplin, 1st Baronet =

British lawyer, businessman and politician

Sir Robert Chaplin, 1st Baronet (c. 1670 – 1 July 1726) of Louth, Lincolnshire was a British lawyer, businessman and politician who sat in the House of Commons from 1715 until 1721, when he was expelled for being a director of the South Sea Company.

== Early life ==
Chaplin was the third son of Sir Francis Chaplin, Lord Mayor of London in 1677, and his wife Anne Huett, daughter of Daniel Huett of Essex. He was admitted to Middle Temple in 1685 and to Inner Temple in 1688. He was called to the bar in 1692. In 1696 he married Anne Harrington.

== Career ==
At the 1715 general election Chaplin was elected Member of Parliament for Great Grimsby, a constituency represented by businessmen of doubtful character, in particularly those associated with the South Sea Company. He was created baronet on 19 September 1715. In 1717 he became a bencher of Inner Temple. His friend Sir James Bateman persuaded him in 1718 to become a Director of the South Sea Company. The Company used dubious practices to inflate the value of its stock, and when the Bubble burst in 1720 thousands of investors lost their investments. The Government intervened and sequestered part of the estates of the main participants in the company for paying compensation. The Directors were barred from sitting in Parliament or holding public office. Chaplin was therefore expelled on 28 January 1721.

Chaplin was examined by an investigation committee, and argued that he had not been party to any fraud and had not taken any stock. However it was discovered that he had accepted stock as a loan. His own estate was valued at £45,000 of which he was only allowed to keep £10,000.

He died on 1 July 1726, leaving a daughter Anne who married James, son of the banker Sir James Bateman who had initially led him astray.

Parliament of Great Britain
Preceded by Arthur Moore; William Cotesworth	Member of Parliament for Great Grimsby; 1715–1721; With: Joseph Banks	Succeeded by Arthur Moore; Joseph Banks
Baronetage of Great Britain
New creation	Baronet (of Inner Temple); 1715-1726	Succeeded by John Chaplin
