= Viner =

Viner is a surname. Notable people with the surname include:

- Brian Viner (born 1961), English journalist
- Charles Viner (jurist), British legal writer
- Charles Viner (1812–1906), British philatelist
- Cliff Viner (born 1949), American businessman
- Emily Viner, Australian mountain bike orienteer
- Frederick Viner (1858–1940), English watercolour artist.
- Giuseppe Viner (1875–1925), Italian painter
- Horace Viner (1880–1955), Welsh footballer
- Ian Viner (born 1933), Australian politician
- Irina Viner (born 1948), Russian rhythmic gymnastics coach
- Jacob Viner (1892–1970), Canadian economist
- Katharine Viner (born 1971), English journalist
- Michael Viner (1944–2009), American film and record producer
- Monique Viner (1926–2006), British judge
- Sir Robert Viner, 1st Baronet (1631–1688), English businessman and Lord Mayor of London
- William Litton Viner (1790–1867), British organist and composer
- William Samuel Viner (1881–1933), Australian chess master

== See also ==
- Vyner, another surname
