= Tom Bridges =

British Army officer (1871–1939)

Lieutenant-General Sir Tom Bridges KCB KCMG DSO
- Bridges in 1918

19th Governor of South Australia
- In office 4 December 1922 – 4 December 1927
- Monarch: George V
- Premier: Henry Barwell (1922–1924); John Gunn (1924–1926); Lionel Hill (1926–1927); Richard Butler (1927)
- Preceded by: Sir Archibald Weigall
- Succeeded by: Sir Alexander Hore-Ruthven

Personal details
- Born: George Tom Molesworth Bridges; 20 August 1871 Eltham, Kent
- Died: 26 November 1939 (aged 68) Brighton, East Sussex
- Relations: Robert Bridges (uncle)
- Children: Alvilde Lees-Milne
- Profession: British Army officer

Military service
- Allegiance: United Kingdom
- Branch/service: British Army
- Years of service: 1892–1922
- Rank: Lieutenant-General
- Unit: Royal Artillery
- Commands: 19th (Western) Division
- Battles/wars: Second Boer War; First World War: Battle of Mons; Battle of Passchendaele; Battle of the Menin Road Ridge
- Awards: Knight Commander of the Order of the Bath; Knight Commander of the Order of St Michael and St George; Distinguished Service Order; Mentioned in dispatches

Lieutenant-General Sir George Tom Molesworth Bridges KCB KCMG DSO (20 August 1871 – 26 November 1939) was a British Army officer and the 19th Governor of South Australia.

Bridges had a distinguished military career, seeing service in Africa, India, South Africa, and most notably Europe during the First World War, where he was involved in the first British battle of the war at Mons, and later commanded the 19th (Western) Division during the Battle of the Somme in 1916 and then in the Battle of Passchendaele the following year. After the war, he served in Greece, Russia, the Balkans, and Asia Minor before becoming Governor of South Australia from 1922 to 1927.

== Early life ==
Bridges was born at Park Farm, Eltham, Kent, England, to Major Thomas Walker Bridges and Mary Ann Philippi. He was educated at Newton Abbot College and later at the Royal Military Academy, Woolwich. He was married in London on 14 November 1907, to a widow, Janet Florence Marshall; they had one daughter, Alvilde Bridges, born in 1909. Alvilde married Anthony Chaplin, 3rd Viscount Chaplin and then James Lees-Milne.

== Early military career ==
After graduating from the Royal Military Academy, Woolwich, Bridges joined the Royal Artillery as a second lieutenant on 19 February 1892, and soon served in India and Nyasaland (now Malawi). He was promoted to lieutenant on 19 February 1895, and was seconded to the Central Africa Regiment from July to November 1899.

In 1899 he transferred to South Africa to serve in the Second Boer War. Attached to the Imperial Light Horse, he took part in the relief of Ladysmith, and received the rank of captain supernumerary to the establishment on 5 April 1900. For a few months in 1901 he was in command of two West Australian Mounted infantry contingents, and was severely wounded. He was confirmed as captain in the Royal Artillery on 8 January 1902, and served in South Africa till the end of the war in June 1902, after which he left Cape Town in SS Plassy in August, returning to Southampton the following month. For his war service, he was mentioned in dispatches, including the final despatch by Lord Kitchener dated 23 June 1902, and received a brevet promotion as major on 22 August 1902.

Later that year saw him leave the United Kingdom for Berbera, where he took charge of Guns in a Flying Column serving in Somaliland. Promoted from supernumerary captain and brevet major in July 1904, and to captain on 3 June 1908, in 1908 he became the chief instructor at the Cavalry School at Netheravon. Seeking a more rapid promotion in the army, Bridges transferred to the 4th Queen's Own Hussars in 1909, attaining the substantive rank of major. He was appointed military attaché to the Low Countries and Scandinavia between 1910 and 1914.

== First World War ==
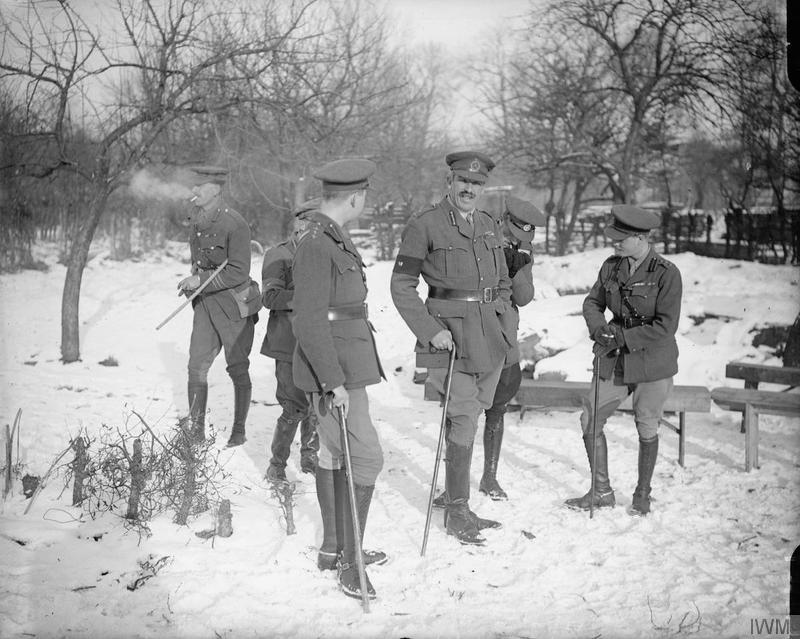
Prince Edward, the prince of Wales, and Major General Tom Bridges, GOC of the 19th (Western) Division (in centre, facing camera), after inspection of the 8th (Service) Battalion, North Staffordshire Regiment, near Beaussart, France, 1 February 1917.

Early in the First World War, Bridges was involved in the Battle of Mons, where he suffered a shattered cheekbone and concussion. During the British Expeditionary Force (BEF)'s retreat from Mons, he met two battalions of exhausted British soldiers at Saint Quentin, whose officers planned to surrender to save the town from bombardment. In a celebrated incident on 27 August, the injured Bridges used a tin whistle and toy drum purchased from a toy shop to rally the men and led them to rejoin the British Expeditionary Force (BEF), commanded by Field Marshal Sir John French In September he transferred to the 4th Hussars as a lieutenant colonel. In October, French flew Bridges to the besieged Belgian city of Antwerp to provide intelligence there for the British headquarters. Later that month, he was promoted to temporary colonel and became a general staff officer, grade 1.

He was appointed a Companion of the Order of St Michael and St George in late 1915 and given command of the 19th (Western) Division, a Kitchener's Army formation, which was demoralised after severe casualties at the Battle of Loos, receiving a temporary promotion to major general on 13 December. On 1 January 1916 he was promoted to brevet colonel. He set about turning the 19th Division into an efficient fighting unit, purging the senior officers. The division was in reserve on the disastrous first day of the Battle of the Somme, and thus avoided serious casualties. It acquitted itself well in the small subsequent attacks around La Boiselle in July.

In 1917, Bridges, who in January was promoted to substantive major general, was sent on the Balfour Mission, the military liaison to the United States under Arthur Balfour, soon after the American entry into the war in April 1917, to coordinate the sending of American soldiers to Europe. He ran into some difficulty because, like most senior British commanders and politicians, he pushed for the amalgamation or incorporation of Americans into understrength British units to be commanded by British officers. This caused much friction with the senior American commanders, who felt that American troops should be commanded by American officers.

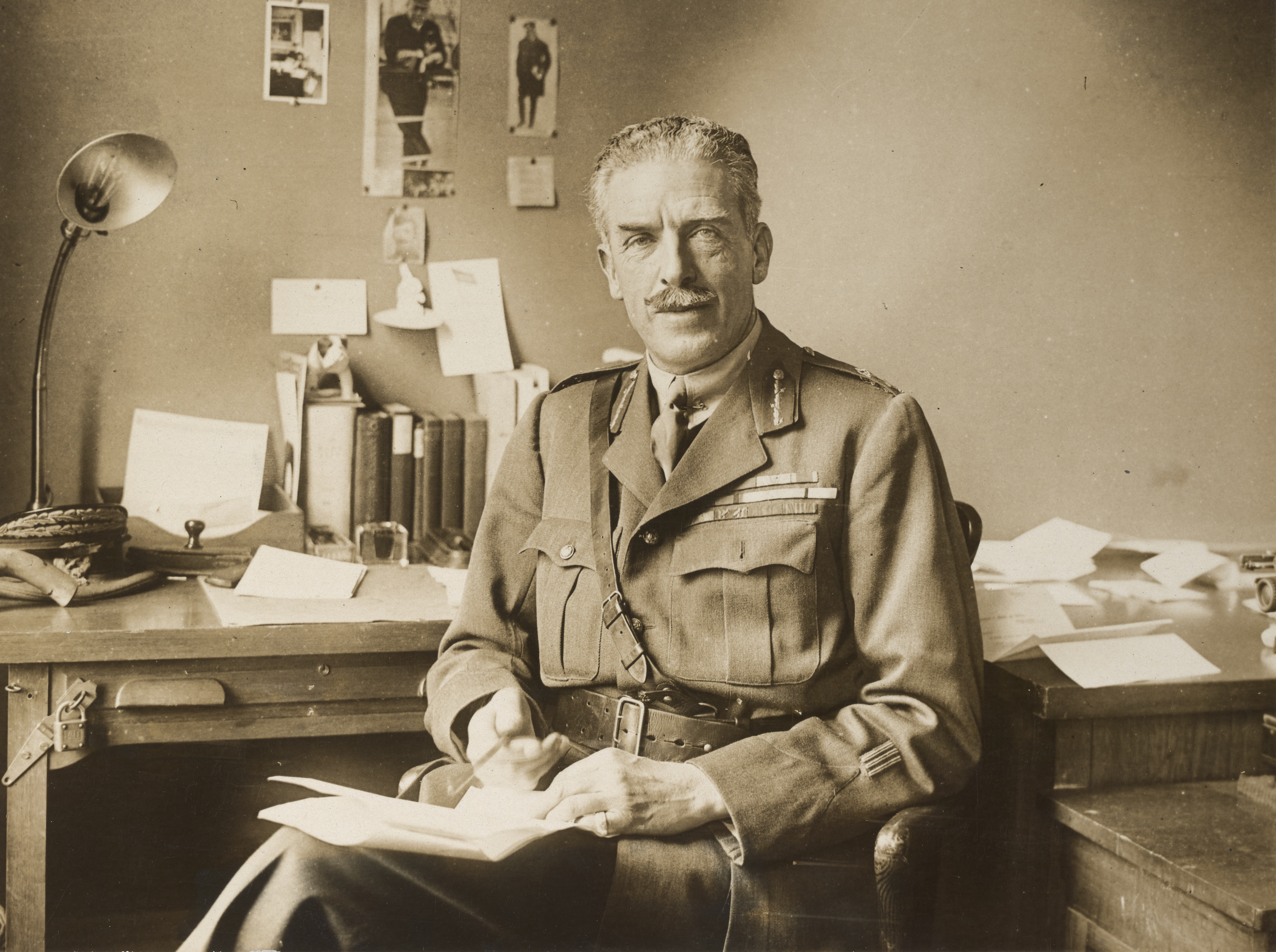
Lieutenant-General Tom Bridges, head of all British war missions to the United States, pictured here at his headquarters in Washington, D.C., 29 April 1918

Bridges returned in time to lead his division in the Battle of Passchendaele in the second half of 1917. He was severely injured on 20 September at the Battle of the Menin Road Ridge. It occurred after he had left his headquarters (HQ) at Sherpenburg to visit Brigadier-General Thomas Cubitt, commanding the 57th Brigade, whose HQ was in a dugout on Hill 60. While a German artillery barrage was ongoing, Bridges left Cubitt's dugout when a shell exploded nearby, shattering Bridges' right leg, which was amputated later that night at Wulveringham. Not wanting to return to England, the next six weeks were spent at a base hospital at Montreuil, near Bologne.

He recovered quickly, however, and after a three-month stint as head of the trench warfare department of Winston Churchill's Ministry of Munitions, was sent back to the United States, specifically Washington, D.C., to coordinate the dispatch of American reinforcements to the Western Front. The rate of reinforcements was soon increased threefold.

Subsequently, Bridges, promoted in January 1919 to the temporary rank of lieutenant general whilst specially employed, was appointed to liaison missions to Greece, the Balkans, and Russia (where he was responsible for the evacuation of the British Mission and the remains of the anti-Bolshevik White Army from Novorossiysk in March 1920). His final active service was in Greece, fighting against the Turks in Asia Minor. He was made colonel of the 5th Dragoon Guards in April 1920.

After the war, he was appointed a Knight Commander of the Order of St Michael and St George (1919) and a Knight Commander of the Order of the Bath (1925). His uncle, the Poet Laureate Robert Bridges, honoured him with an ode To His Excellency.

== Governor of South Australia ==
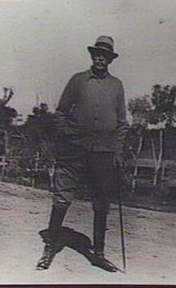
Governor Tom Bridges in 1927

Bridges was appointed Governor of South Australia in 1922, at the instigation of his friend Winston Churchill. Bridges arrived in Adelaide in December of the same year.

Bridges was a conservative governor, defending capital punishment, supporting the Legislative Council, and denouncing "unemployables". He was popular with returned servicemen. His speeches were dominated mostly by denouncements of Bolshevism, and promotion of immigration. He was scornful of the Prohibition movement, and created a political storm by addressing a licensed victualler's dinner, entertaining them with G. K. Chesterton drinking songs and other hilarious prohibition stories.

He travelled to the Northern Territory in 1923 by motor-car in a well publicized trip.

His younger sister, Philippa Beatrice Bridgers (1876-1930), visited him in Australia, and made a camel-trek through central Australia. She wrote about her experiences in A Walkabout in Australia published in 1925.

Bridges became frustrated with the Labor ministries of 1924–27. He was particularly angered by Premier John Gunn's publishing of a secret memorandum of a former premier to the governor. When he was offered a second term as governor in 1927 he refused it, and returned to London that year.

== Retirement ==
Bridges devoted his retirement to painting and writing. He published several books:

- Alarms and excursions: reminiscences of a soldier (Longmans & Co, London, 1938)
- compiler, Word from England: an anthology of prose and poetry (English Universities Press, London, 1940)
- Friedrich von Bernhardi, Cavalry in war and peace translated from German by Major George Tom Molesworth Bridges (Hugh Rees, London, 1910)

He had also studied at the Slade School of Fine Art, and was an accomplished painter. He held many one-man exhibitions in Adelaide and London where his oils and watercolours were sold.

He died at 12 Dyke Road, Brighton, on 26 November 1939, not long after the outbreak of the Second World War.

== Bibliography ==
- Davies, Frank (1997). Bloody Red Tabs: General Officer Casualties of the Great War 1914–1918. London: Pen and Sword Books. ISBN 9781783462377.

Military offices
Preceded by Charles Fasken	GOC 19th (Western) Division; 1915–1917	Succeeded by George Jeffreys
Government offices
Preceded by Sir Archibald Weigall	Governor of South Australia; 1922–1927	Succeeded by Sir Alexander Hore-Ruthven
Honorary titles
Preceded by William Edward Marsland	Colonel of the 5th Dragoon Guards; 1920–1922	Regiment consolidated
Preceded by Formed from the 5th Dragoon Guards and the 6th (Inniskilling) Dragoons	Colonel of the 5th Royal Inniskilling Dragoon Guards; 1922–1937	Succeeded by Roger Evans
