= Sir William Ellys, 2nd Baronet =

Sir William Ellys (1654–1727) of Wyham and Nocton, Lincolnshire was an English Whig politician who sat in the English House of Commons and British House of Commons for Grantham between 1679 and 1681 and between 1689 and 1713.

== Early life ==
He was born 2 May 1654, the eldest son of Sir Thomas Ellys of Wyham by Anne, daughter of Sir John Stanhope of Elvaston Castle, Derbyshire. His father was reported to be a drunk and Ellys was brought up in the Presbyterian of his great-uncle William Ellis (solicitor-general). He succeeded to the baronetcy on the death of his father in 1668. He matriculated at Lincoln College, Oxford in November 1670, receiving his MA a year later.

In October 1672 he married Isabella (d. 1686), daughter of Richard Hampden of Great Hampden, Buckinghamshire.

== Career ==
In 1678 his election for the parliamentary seat of Grantham was overturned under pressure from the king, but he was succeeded in securing the seat the following year. He was a moderately active Exclusionist. On his great-uncle's death in 1680, he inherited the majority of the estate and subsequently moved from Wyham to Nocton, where he built a 'magnificent seat' (burnt down in 1834). There was a hiatus in his parliamentary career during the reign of James II, but he then sat for Grantham continuously from 1685 until 1713. The strength of his Whig views apparently moderated in his later years, leading him on occasion to vote with the administration.

He died at Nocton in October 1727, leaving a son Richard and 2 daughters: Sarah and Isabella.

Baronetage of England
Preceded by Thomas Ellys	Baronet (of Wyham); 1727–1742	Succeeded by Richard Ellys
