= Cadeby =

Cadeby may refer to:

- Cadeby, Leicestershire, England
- Cadeby, Lincolnshire, England
- Cadeby, South Yorkshire, England
