= Anthony Chaplin, 3rd Viscount Chaplin =

Anthony Freskyn Charles Hamby Chaplin, 3rd Viscount Chaplin (14 December 1906 – 18 December 1981) was a British hereditary peer and an amateur zoologist and musician.

== Biography ==
Born in 1906, Chaplin was the son of Eric Chaplin, 2nd Viscount Chaplin, and the Hon Gwladys Wilson, daughter of Charles Wilson, 1st Baron Nunburnholme and Florence Wellesley. He was educated at Radley College.

During 1935 and 1936, Chaplin went on a zoological expedition to New Guinea. He was Secretary of the Zoological Society of London between 1952 and 1955, and a member of its Council.

Chaplin studied musical composition in Paris with Nadia Boulanger between 1936 and 1939. He served as an Officer in the Royal Air Force from 1940 until 1946, achieving the rank of Flight Lieutenant.

Chaplin succeeded his father as 3rd Viscount Chaplin in 1949.

== Marriages & children ==
Chaplin was married firstly on 9 January 1933 to Alvilde Bridges (1909–1994), the only daughter of Lt Gen Sir Tom Bridges. They had one daughter:

- Hon. Oenone Clarissa Chaplin (12 April 1934 – 8 October 2021)

The marriage to Alvilde was dissolved in 1950 and on 16 March 1951 he married secondly Rosemary Lyttelton (1922–2003), daughter of Oliver Lyttelton, 1st Viscount Chandos and Lady Moira Osborne. They had two daughters:

- Hon. Miranda Amadea Chaplin (born 3 January 1956)
- Hon. Christina Susanna Chaplin (born 16 December 1958)

Lord Chaplin died in 1981 in Belgravia, London, when in the absence of male heirs, the viscountcy became extinct.

== Ancestry ==
Ancestors of Anthony Chaplin, 3rd Viscount Chaplin

16. Charles Chaplin (1759 – c. 1821)
8. Rev. Henry Chaplin (born 1789)
17. Elizabeth Taylor
4. Henry Chaplin, 1st Viscount Chaplin (1840–1923)
18. William Ellice
9. Caroline Ellice
2. Eric Chaplin, 2nd Viscount Chaplin (1877–1949)
20. George Sutherland-Leveson-Gower, 2nd Duke of Sutherland (1786–1861)
10. George Sutherland-Leveson-Gower, 3rd Duke of Sutherland (1828–1892)
21. Lady Harriet Howard (1806–1868)
5. Lady Florence Sutherland-Leveson-Gower (1855–1881)
22. John Hay-Mackenzie (c. 1792 – 1849)
11. Anne Hay-Mackenzie, Countess of Cromartie (1829–1888)
23. Anne Gibson-Craig (1802–1869)
1. Anthony Chaplin, 3rd Viscount Chaplin
24. David Wilson (1746–1810)
12. Thomas Wilson (1792–1869)
25. Elizabeth Grey (b. c. 1750)
6. Charles Wilson, 1st Baron Nunburnholme (1833–1907)
26. John West
13. Susannah West (1796–1879)
27. Grace Harrop
3. Hon. Gwladys Wilson (1881–1971)
28. Rev. Hon. Gerald Wellesley (1770–1848)
14. Col. William Wellesley (1813–1888)
29. Lady Emily Cadogan (1773–1839)
7. Florence Wellesley (1853–1932)
30. Thomas Hayden
15. Jane Hayden (died 1901)

== Arms ==
Coat of arms of Anthony Chaplin, 3rd Viscount Chaplin

Crest
A griffin's head erased Or gorged with a mural coronet Vert.
Escutcheon
Ermine on a chief indented Vert three griffins' heads erased Or.
Supporters
Dexter upon a garb fesswise Proper banded Gules a hawk wings endorsed and inverted Argent beaked membered and the inside of the wings Or suspended from the neck by a riband Sable an escutcheon of the arms of Sutherland (i.e. Gules three mullets Or within a bordure of the last charged with a double tressure flory counterflory of the field). Sinister a chestnut-coloured racehorse in a white headstall banded rose colour pendant therefrom a blue lead all Proper.
Motto
In Coela Quies

Professional and academic associations
Preceded by Sheffield Airey Neave	Secretary of the Zoological Society of London; 1952–1955	Succeeded by Solly Zuckerman
Peerage of the United Kingdom
Preceded by Eric Chaplin	Viscount Chaplin; 1949–1981	Extinct
