= St John baronets of Longthorpe (1715) =

Escutcheon of the St John baronets of Longthorpe

The St John baronetcy of Longthorpe was created on 10 September 1715 for Francis Saint John, the outgoing Sheriff of Northamptonshire for 1714–5. He was the eldest son of Francis St John, and grandson of Oliver St John of Thorpe Hall; his maternal grandfather was the London brewer Dannet(t) Fo(o)rth.

Saint John was born c.1680, and entered Lincoln's Inn in 1697. He married in 1712 Mary Gould (died 1720), eldest daughter of Nathaniel Gould and his wife Frances Hartopp, daughter of Sir John Hartopp, 3rd Baronet. He left no male heir on his death in 1756, and the title became extinct. Of two daughters, Mary married Sir John Bernard, 4th Baronet, and left issue on her death in 1793.

== Notes ==
Baronetage of Great Britain
Preceded by Tench baronets	St John baronets of Longthorpe; 10 September 1715	Succeeded by Chaplin baronets
