= Ellys baronets =

Extinct baronetcy in the Baronetage of England

The Ellys Baronetcy, of Wyham in the County of Lincoln, was a title in the Baronetage of England.

The baronetcy was created on 30 June 1660 for Thomas Ellys. This may have compensation for the lapsing of the grant of a baronetcy to his uncle William by Oliver Cromwell. The first baronet was reportedly a 'drunken sot', who died young. His son William, the second Baronet, was raised by his great uncle and inherited from him a substantial estate around Grantham. The second Baronet was Member of Parliament for Grantham between 1679 and 1713. The third Baronet was Member of Parliament for Grantham and Boston. The title became extinct on his death in 1742.

== Ellys baronets, of Wyham (1660) ==
- Sir Thomas Ellys, 1st Baronet (1627–1668)
- Sir William Ellys, 2nd Baronet (1654–1727)
- Sir Richard Ellys, 3rd Baronet (1683–1742)
