= Sir William Massingberd, 3rd Baronet =

Meux's Name Act 1737
- Act of Parliament
- Parliament of Great Britain
- Long title: An Act to enable William Massingberd Esquire, heretofore called William Meux, and the Heirs Male of his Body, to take and use the Surname of Massingberd, pursuant to a Settlement made by Sir William Massingberd Baronet, deceased.
- Citation: 11 Geo. 2. c. 23 Pr.
- Territorial extent: Great Britain

Dates
- Royal assent: 20 May 1738
- Commencement: 24 January 1738 (Note: Start of session.)

Status: Current legislation

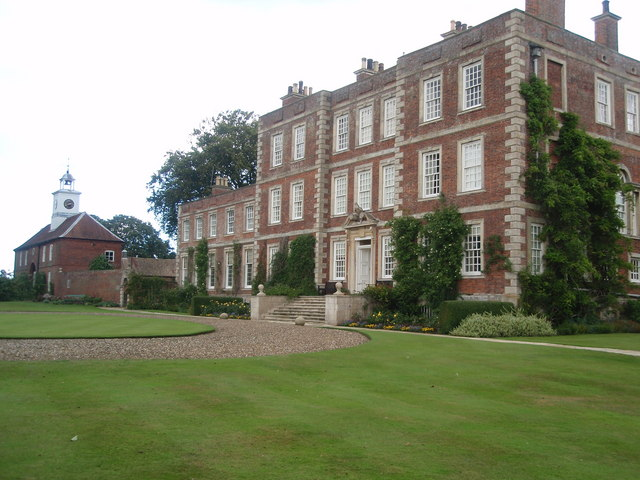
Gunby Hall, Lincolnshire

Sir William Massingberd, 3rd Baronet (1677 – 1723) of Gunby Hall, Lincolnshire was a British politician who sat in the House of Commons from 1721 to 1723.

He was the only son of Sir William Massingberd, 2nd Baronet and educated at Merchant Taylors’ School in 1690-1 and St Catharine's College, Cambridge. He inherited his baronetcy on his father's death in 1719.

Massingberd stood for parliament at Boston at a by-election in 1719, but was defeated. He was then elected Member of Parliament (MP) for Lincolnshire at a by-election in January 1721. He was re-elected for Lincolnshire at the 1722 general election and sat until his death in 1723.

On Massingberd's unmarried death, the baronetcy became extinct and his estate, including Gunby Hall, passed to his nephew William Meux, who changed name by a private act of Parliament, Meux's Name Act 1737 (11 Geo. 2. c. 23 Pr.), to Massingberd as a condition of the inheritance, thereby becoming William Meux Massingberd.

== Notes ==
Parliament of the United Kingdom
Preceded by Sir Willoughby Hickman, Bt; The Viscount Tyrconnel	Member of Parliament for Lincolnshire; 1721–1723; With: Sir Willoughby Hickman, Bt (1721); Henry Heron (1722-23)	Succeeded by Robert Vyner; Henry Heron
Baronetage of England
Preceded by William Massingberd	Baronet (of Braytoft Hall); 1719–1723	Extinct
