= James Lees-Milne =

English architectural historian (1908–1997)

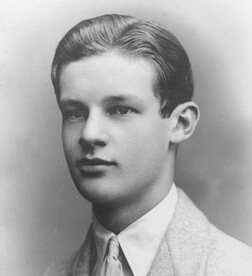
- Lees-Milne in the 1920s
- Born: George James Henry Lees-Milne; 6 August 1908; Wickhamford, Worcestershire, England
- Died: 28 December 1997 (aged 89); Tetbury, Gloucestershire, England
- Education: Lockers Park School; Eton College
- Alma mater: Magdalen College, Oxford
- Occupations: Architectural historian; novelist; biographer
- Spouse: Alvilde, Viscountess Chaplin (m. 1951; died 1994)

George James Henry Lees-Milne (6 August 1908 – 28 December 1997) was an English writer and expert on country houses, who worked for the National Trust from 1936 to 1973. He was an architectural historian, novelist and biographer. His extensive diaries remain in print.

== Early life ==
Lees-Milne was born on 6 August 1908 at Wickhamford Manor, Worcestershire as George James Henry Lees-Milne. His biographer Michael Bloch observed that in Another Self, Lees-Milne "conveys the impression that he hailed from an old county family and that Wickhamford was their native seat. This was not quite the case.... His father... had bought Wickhamford, and moved from Lancashire to Worcestershire, only two years before Jim's birth." By 1924, the family had acquired Ribbesford House, near Bewdley.

He was the second of three children and the elder son of a prosperous cotton manufacturer and farmer, George Crompton Lees-Milne (1880–1949), and his wife, Helen Christina (1884–1962), a daughter of Henry Bailey, JP and Deputy Lieutenant of Coates, Gloucestershire. Lees-Milne's maternal grandfather was Sir Joseph Bailey, 1st Baronet. His uncle, Joseph Bailey, second baronet, was later created Baron Glanusk.

George Lees-Milne, once a lieutenant in the Cheshire Yeomanry, chaired the family business, A. and A. Crompton & Co. Ltd, deriving a fortune mainly from a Lancashire cotton mill. Lees-Milne's parents were a "curiously contrasting couple" – his father "shy but steady" and "conventional in outlook" with a "predilection for gambling and philandering", "obsessively punctual and constantly making plans". His mother was "uninhibited with a streak of mental instability... which ran in the Bailey family and which [Lees-Milne] always feared might lurk in himself." She was "unconventional", "whimsical and impulsive", and where "she had a sense of humour, he [her husband] had none." An exaggerated portrait of his parents as "a pair of ludicrous eccentrics" appears in Another Life. Lees-Milne's sister, Audrey, born in 1905, married Matthew Arthur, 3rd Baron Glenarthur. His brother Richard was born in 1910.

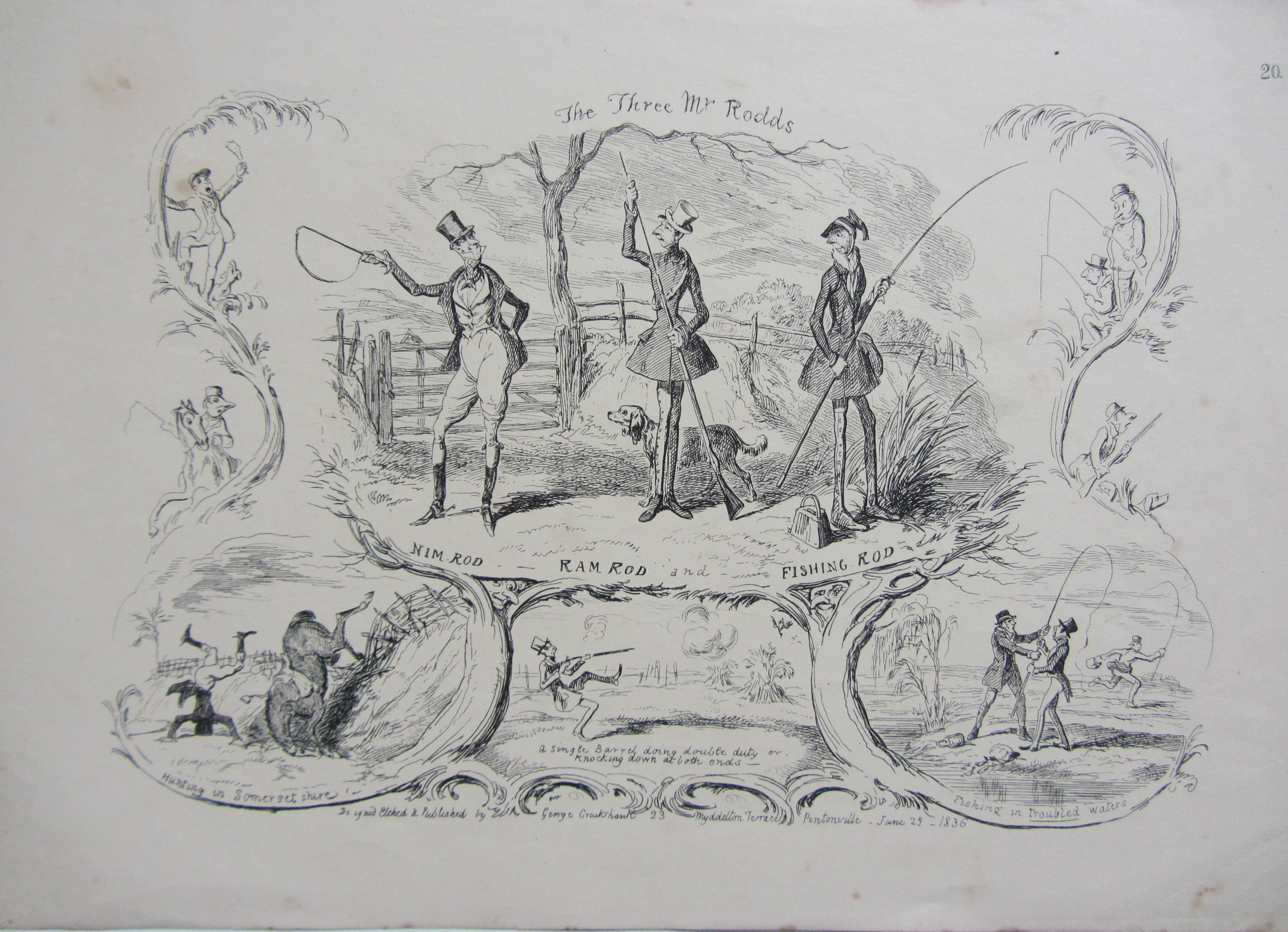
The Three Rods: Nimrod, Ramrod and Fishingrod (Joseph, James and John Lees) George Cruikshank 1884

The Lees-Milne family belonged to a junior branch of the Lees family that later came to own Thurland Castle, Lancashire, having been tenant farmers on an estate called Clarksfield near Oldham, which they later purchased from the Booth family of Dunham Massey in the reign of James I. Succeeding generations became successful as "master cotton spinners and manufacturers". Its members were "a rough lot" (Lees-Milne suggested their motto should have been "Sport and Booze"). Though the discovery of coal on their land increased their wealth, it "did not civilise them" – Lees-Milne's great-grandfather, Joseph Lees (1819-1890), was "one of three barely literate brothers... known, after their respective obsessions, as Nimrod, Ramrod and Fishing Rod". Joseph was "Fishing Rod". James Arthur Lees, the son of "Ramrod", owner of Alkrington Hall, Middleton, was the author of Three in Norway (by two of them).

They had ties of marriage to two families he claimed to be "slightly grander": the Cromptons of Crompton Hall and the Milnes of Park House.

The name Milne was added by royal licence in 1890 by Lees-Milne's grandfather James (the first of the family to attend Eton) to comply with terms for inheriting the estate of a maternal relative. A pillar of the Conservative Party in Oldham, supporting Winston Churchill's candidacy, this James Lees-Milne was said to have refused a baronetcy (which would have come to his grandson James) on the grounds that he might have to make public speeches. The estate acquired included Crompton Hall, Lancashire, which alongside Wickhamford Manor was owned by George Crompton Lees-Milne. (He eventually sold both, but the former stayed in the family).

Lees-Milne attended Lockers Park School in Hertfordshire, Eton, and Magdalen College, Oxford, from which he graduated with a third-class degree in history in 1931.

== Career ==
From 1931 to 1935, Lees-Milne was private secretary to George Lloyd, 1st Baron Lloyd. In 1936 he became secretary of the Country Houses Committee of the National Trust, remaining so until 1950, apart from military service in 1939–1941. During his tenure he contributed regularly to the membership newsletter. He was instrumental in the first large-scale transfer of country houses from private ownership to the Trust. He resigned his full-time position in 1950, but continued his National Trust ties as a part-time architectural consultant and committee member.

=== Writings ===
From 1947 Lees-Milne published several architectural works aimed mainly at general readers. His witty, waspish and extensive diaries appeared in twelve volumes and were well received. Larry McMurtry commented that Lees-Milne, like Samuel Pepys and James Boswell, was disarmingly open about his failings – indeed, would not have known how to go about hiding them. Nicholas Birns notes that Lees-Milne spoke "so candidly about himself, his life, and his love of art and architecture that his authorial relationship with the reader becomes a privileged one, not to be readily or casually communicated, not to be flaunted or brandished." His other works included several biographies, for instance of Harold Nicolson, William Cavendish, 6th Duke of Devonshire, and Reginald Brett, 2nd Viscount Esher, and an autobiographical novel.

In 1993 Lees-Milne declined a CBE in the New Year's Honours list, having felt that a knighthood was his due.

== Personal life ==
Lees-Milne was visiting Diana, Lady Mosley (Diana Mitford) in December 1936 when King Edward VIII abdicated. His purpose was to examine the 17th-century house that she and her husband Sir Oswald Mosley were renting. He wrote later how he and Diana (her husband was in London) had listened to the King's broadcast abdication speech with tears running down their faces. He had been a lover of her brother Tom Mitford when they were at Eton College together and was devastated when Tom was killed in action in Burma in 1945. Lees-Milne was friendly with many prominent intellectual and social figures of his day, including Nancy Mitford, Diana Mitford, Harold Nicolson (a former lover, of whom he wrote a two-volume biography), Clementine Hudson (a Banbury aristocrat), and Cyril Connolly.

In 1951, Lees-Milne married Alvilde, Viscountess Chaplin, née Bridges, a prominent gardening and landscape expert. Both were bisexual. Alvilde is said to have had affairs with Vita Sackville-West, Winnaretta Singer and other women.

Alvilde Lees-Milne died in 1994. James Lees-Milne died in a hospital at Tetbury on 28 December 1997. The ashes of both were scattered in the grounds of Essex House.

=== Residences ===
After 13 years at Alderley Grange, Wotton-under-Edge, Gloucestershire, and a brief spell in Bath, from 1974 he and Alvilde lived at Essex House on the Badminton estate, Gloucestershire, although he worked most days in William Thomas Beckford's library at Lansdown Crescent, Bath. While living at Badminton he began a feud with his landlord, the 10th Duke of Beaufort, whose foxhunting and autocratic manner appalled him.

Following Alvilde Lees-Milne's death, however, David Somerset, 11th Duke of Beaufort and his wife (with whom he was on better terms) offered to let him live at Essex House rent-free. Lees-Milne was touched, but valued his independence, had the income to pay rent and did not accept the offer, nor that of his friends, the Duke and Duchess of Devonshire, to live as a permanent guest at Chatsworth House. As a trustee of the Bath Preservation Trust, he became a founding trustee of its Beckford's Tower Trust, founded in 1977 to maintain the building and its collection for public benefit.

== In popular culture ==
In the early 2000s a one-man play, Ancestral Voices devised by Hugh Massingberd, toured the British Isles with actor Moray Watson in the lead role.

A series of three plays inspired by Lees-Milne's diaries – Sometimes into the Arms of God, The Unending Battle and What England Owes – was broadcast by the BBC in July 2013, starring Tobias Menzies and Victoria Hamilton.

== Selected bibliography ==
- The Age of Adam (1947)
- The Tudor Renaissance (1951)
- The Age of Inigo Jones (1953)
- Roman Mornings (1956)
- Earls of Creation: Five Great Patrons of Eighteenth-Century Art (1962)
- St Peter's: The Story of Saint Peter's Basilica in Rome (1967)
- English Country Houses: Baroque, 1685–1715 (1970)
- Another Self (1970), an autobiographical novel
- William Beckford (1976)
- Round the Clock (1978)
- Harold Nicolson: A Biography (1980–1981), 2 vols.
- Images of Bath (1982), illustrated by David Ford
- The Last Stuarts: British Royalty in Exile (1984)
- The Enigmatic Edwardian: The Life of Reginald, 2nd Viscount Esher (1986)
- Some Cotswold Country Houses: A Personal Selection (1987)
- Venetian Evenings (1988)
- The Bachelor Duke: A Life of William Spencer Cavendish, 6th Duke of Devonshire, 1790–1858 (1991)
- People and Places: Country House Donors and the National Trust (1993)
- Ruthenshaw (1994), fiction, a ghost story
- Fourteen Friends (1996)

=== Diaries ===
- Ancestral Voices: 1942-1943 (1975)
- Prophesying Peace: 1944-1945 (1977)
- Caves of Ice: 1946-1947 (1983)
- Midway on the Waves: 1948-1949 (1985)
- A Mingled Measure: 1953-1972 (1994)
- Ancient as the Hills: 1973-1974 (1997)
- Through Wood and Dale: 1975-1978 (1998)
- Deep Romantic Chasm: 1979-1981 (2000)
- Holy Dread: 1982-1984 (2001)
- Beneath a Waning Moon: 1985-1987 (2003)
- Ceaseless Turmoil: 1988-1992 (2004)
- The Milk of Paradise: 1993-1997 (2005)

== Sources ==
- Michael Bloch, James Lees-Milne: The Life, John Murray, 2009, ISBN 978-0-7195-6034-7), an authorised biography
- LEES-MILNE, James, Who Was Who, A & C Black, 1920–2015; online ed., Oxford University Press, 2014
