= Massingberd baronets =

Extinct baronetcy in the Baronetage of England

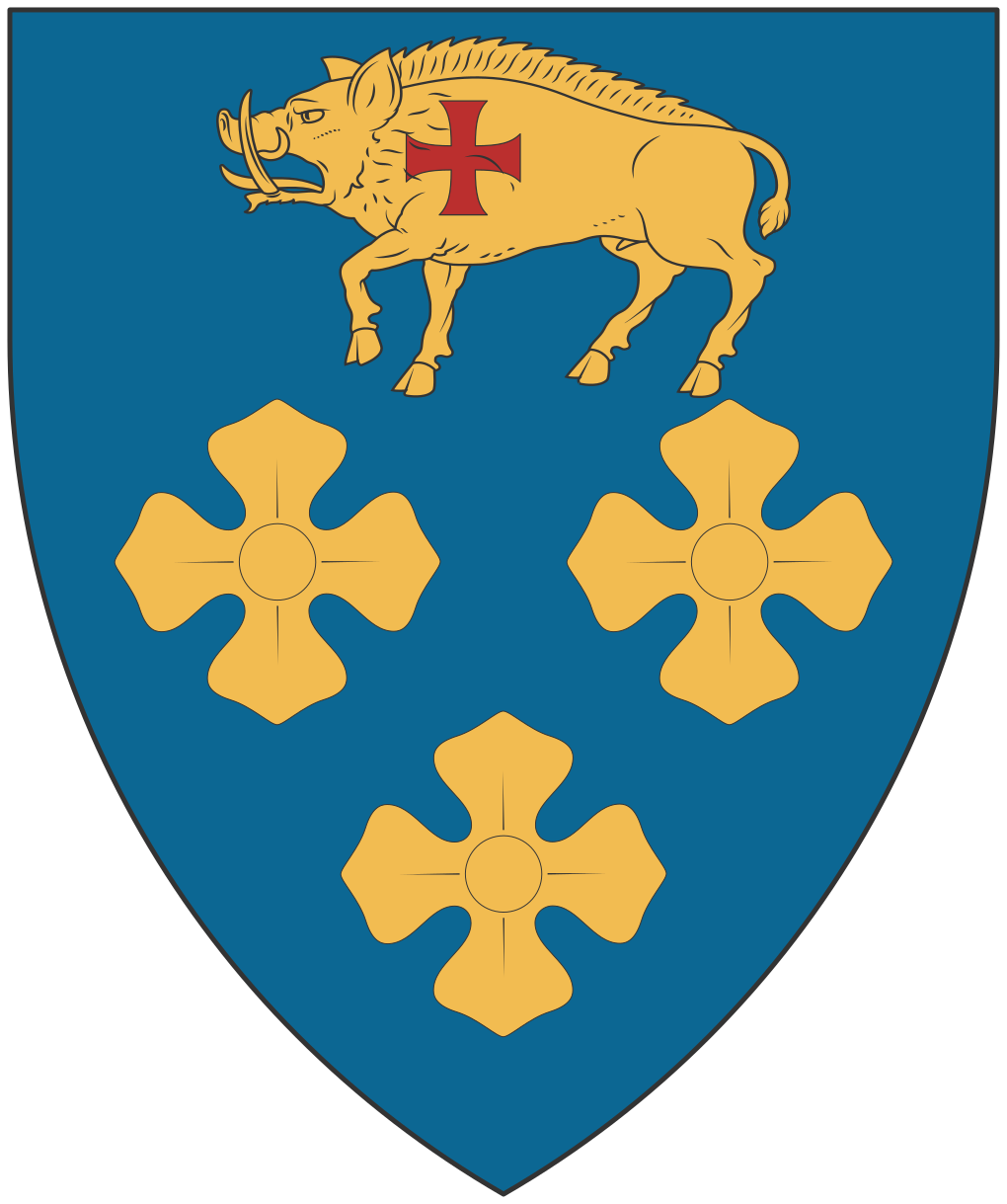
Arms of Massingberd of Braytoft Hall

The Massingberd Baronetcy, of Braytoft Hall in the County of Lincoln, was a title in the Baronetage of England. It was created on 22 August 1660 for Henry Massingberd. The third Baronet sat as member of parliament for Lincolnshire. The title became extinct on his death in 1723.

== Massingberd baronets, of Braytoft Hall (1660) ==
- Sir Henry Massingberd, 1st Baronet (1609–1680)
- Sir William Massingberd, 2nd Baronet (1650–1719)
- Sir William Massingberd, 3rd Baronet (1677–1723)
