= Wickhamford =

Village in Worcestershire, England

Coordinates: 52.071029°N 1.903309°W

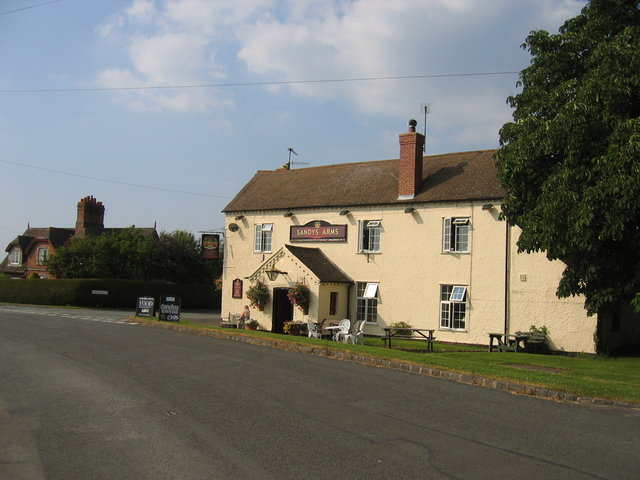
- Sandys Arms, Wickhamford

- Location within Worcestershire
- OS grid reference: SP067414
- Civil parish: Wickhamford
- District: Wychavon
- Shire county: Worcestershire
- Region: West Midlands
- Country: England
- Sovereign state: United Kingdom
- Post town: EVESHAM
- Postcode district: WR11
- Police: West Mercia
- Fire: Hereford and Worcester
- Ambulance: West Midlands
- UK Parliament: Droitwich and Evesham

Wickhamford is a village and a civil parish in Worcestershire, England. It is situated on the A44 road approximately halfway between the towns of Evesham and Broadway. It is mentioned in 1086 in the Domesday Book under the name of Wiquene when it was owned by Evesham Abbey. The origin of the name Wickhamford is unknown. The second element refers to a ford. The first element may be the tribal name Wycwona, or derived from the Welsh gwiggwaun meaning 'wood moor'.

== Wickhamford Manor ==
The manor was built in the 16th century on land belonging to the abbey. It was later sold to Thomas Throckmorton by Elizabeth I. In 1594 it was purchased from the Crown by Sir Samuel Sandys and remained in the family until its sale in 1863.

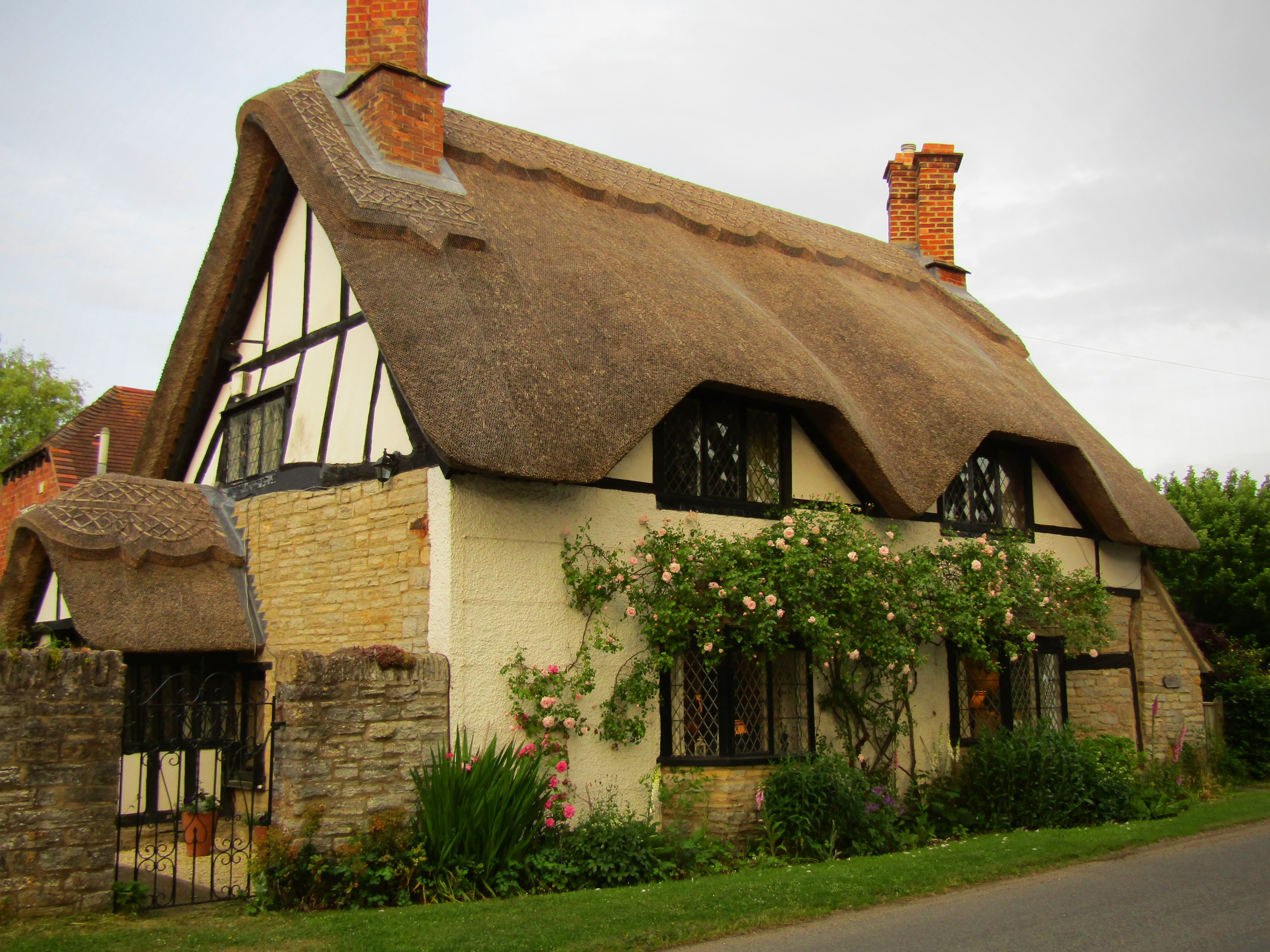
Thatched roof house in Wickhamford

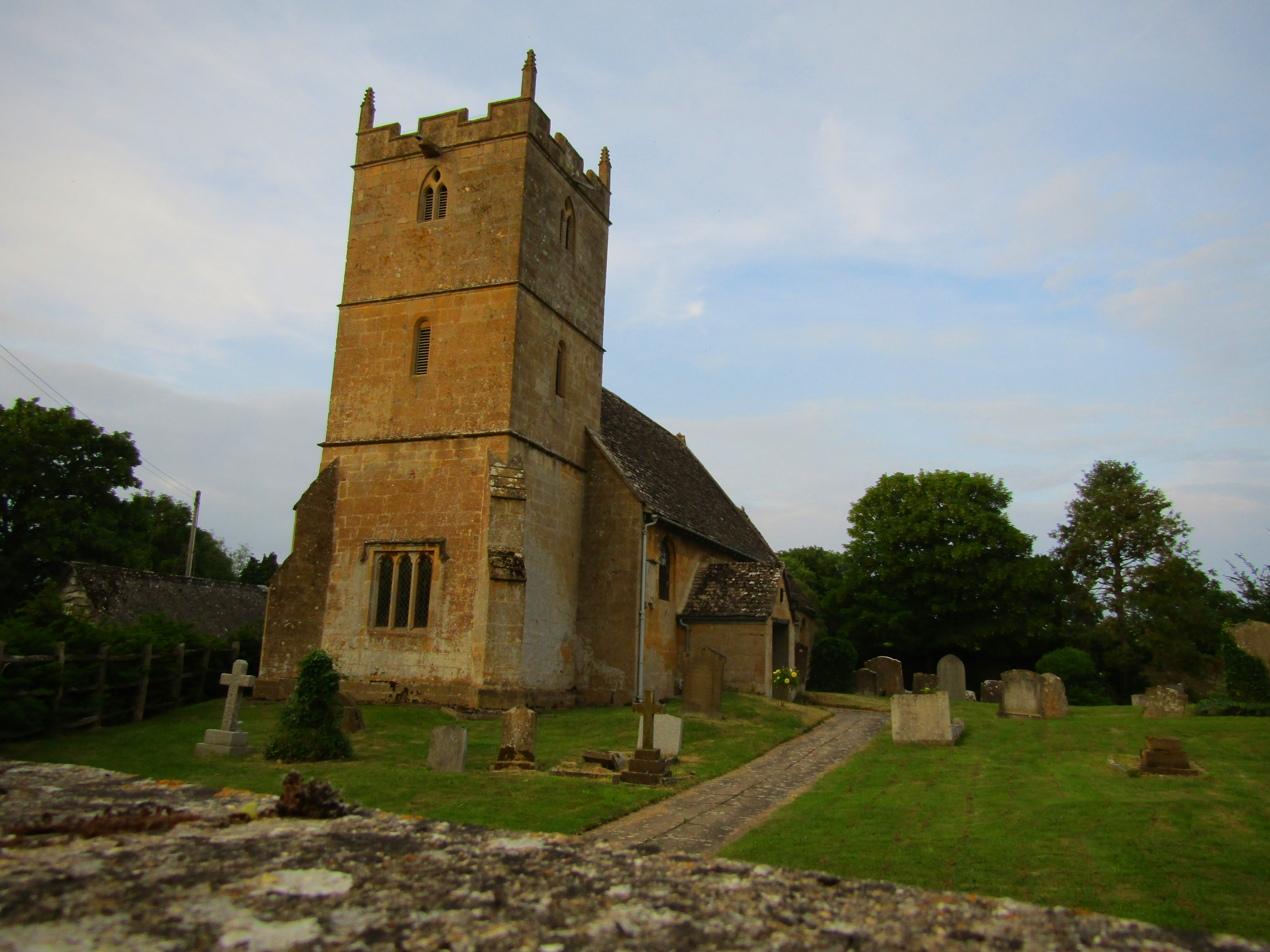
St. John the Baptist Church of Wickhamford

== St. John the Baptist Church ==
The 13th-century parish Church of St. John the Baptist shows a close connection of the Sandys family with the American colonists. It can be seen in the floor slab monument to Penelope Washington within the altar rails. The oak chancel gates were installed in the 17th century with a monument to the Sandys family on the north side. Penelope Washington, whose mother married Sir Samuel Sandys and moved to the Manor House, was a distant relative of George Washington, the first President of the United States of America.
