= Gautby =

Village in the East Lindsey district of Lincolnshire, England

Coordinates: 53.235252°N 0.243398°W

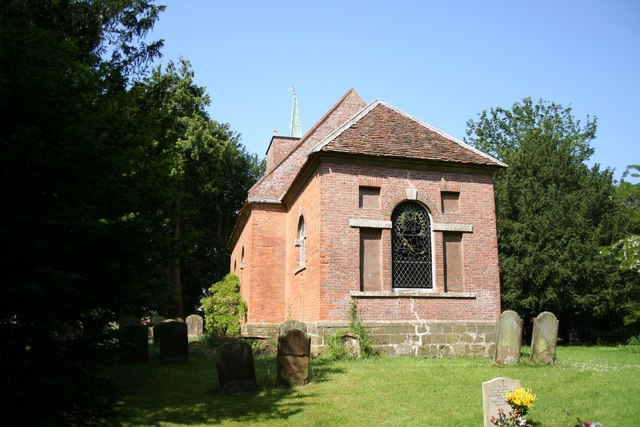
- Church of All Saints, Gautby

- Location within Lincolnshire
- OS grid reference: TF173723
  - London: 115 mi (185 km) S
- Civil parish: Minting
- District: East Lindsey
- Shire county: Lincolnshire
- Region: East Midlands
- Country: England
- Sovereign state: United Kingdom
- Post town: Market Rasen
- Postcode district: LN8
- Police: Lincolnshire
- Fire: Lincolnshire
- Ambulance: East Midlands
- UK Parliament: Louth and Horncastle

Gautby (/ˈɡɔːtbi/ GAWT-bee) is a village in the East Lindsey district of Lincolnshire, England. The village is situated 6 miles (10 km) north-west from the town of Horncastle, and is part of the Minting civil parish.

Gautby parish church is dedicated to All Saints, and is a Grade II* listed building, rebuilt in 1754 of red brick, incorporating some medieval work by Robert Vyner of Gautby Park as a family chapel. Inside, there are two reclining stone figure English church monuments: on the north side, Thomas Vyner, and on the south, Sir Thomas Vyner, former lord mayor of london. Originally in St Mary Woolnoth church, London, they were both erected 1672, and moved by Sir Robert Vyner when Gautby church was rebuilt. A further memorial, an incised slab, records the murder of Frederick G. Vyner by Greek brigands in 1870.

Gautby Hall, the ancient seat of the Vyner family, was destroyed in 1874. Set in Gautby Great Park it was, according to Pevsner, probably designed by Matthew Brettingham; the park has returned to arable land but the hall's stables and lake with island still remain. On the island was an equestrian statue of Charles I "trampling on a prostrate foe", recorded by Kelly's Directory in 1885. Pevsner relates that this statue by Jasper Latham is now at Newby Hall, North Yorkshire.

There are two possible deserted medieval villages west of Gautby; Little Minting, and Thorley. However, no earthworks have been found. Unlike Gautby, both are mentioned in the 1086 Domesday Book, when Little Minting was recorded as having 28 households, 260 acres (1 km^{2}) of meadow and 1,110 acres (4 km^{2}) of woodland. Thorley was recorded as having four households, 175 acres (0.7 km^{2}) of meadow, and 680 acres (3 km^{2}) of woodland.
