= Chaplin baronets =

Extinct baronetcy in the Baronetage of Great Britain

Escutcheon of the Chaplin baronets

The Chaplin baronetcy, of the Inner Temple, London, was a title in the Baronetage of Great Britain. It was created on 19 September 1715 for Robert Chaplin, Member of Parliament for Grimsby, with special remainder to his nephew, Porter Chaplin; Robert Chaplin was the son of Sir Francis Chaplin, Lord Mayor of London from 1677 to 1678.

He was succeeded according to the special remainder by the 2nd Baronet his great-nephew, John Chaplin, the son of the aforementioned Porter Chaplin, who had died in 1719. The title became extinct on the 2nd Baronet's death in 1730.

== Chaplin baronets, of the Inner Temple (1715) ==
- Sir Robert Chaplin, 1st Baronet (died 1726)
- Sir John Chaplin, 2nd Baronet (died 1730)

== Extended family ==
Thomas Chaplin, brother of Porter Chaplin, nephew of the 1st Baronet, was the ancestor of the Viscounts Chaplin.

== See also ==
- Viscount Chaplin

Baronetage of Great Britain
| Preceded by St John baronets | Chaplin baronets of the Inner Temple; 19 September 1715 | Succeeded by Byng baronets |
