= Robert Vyner (1686–1777) =

British politician

Robert Vyner (1686–1777) of Swakeleys, Middlesex, and Gautby, Lincolnshire, was a British politician who sat in the House of Commons for 27 years between 1710 and 1761.

== Early life ==
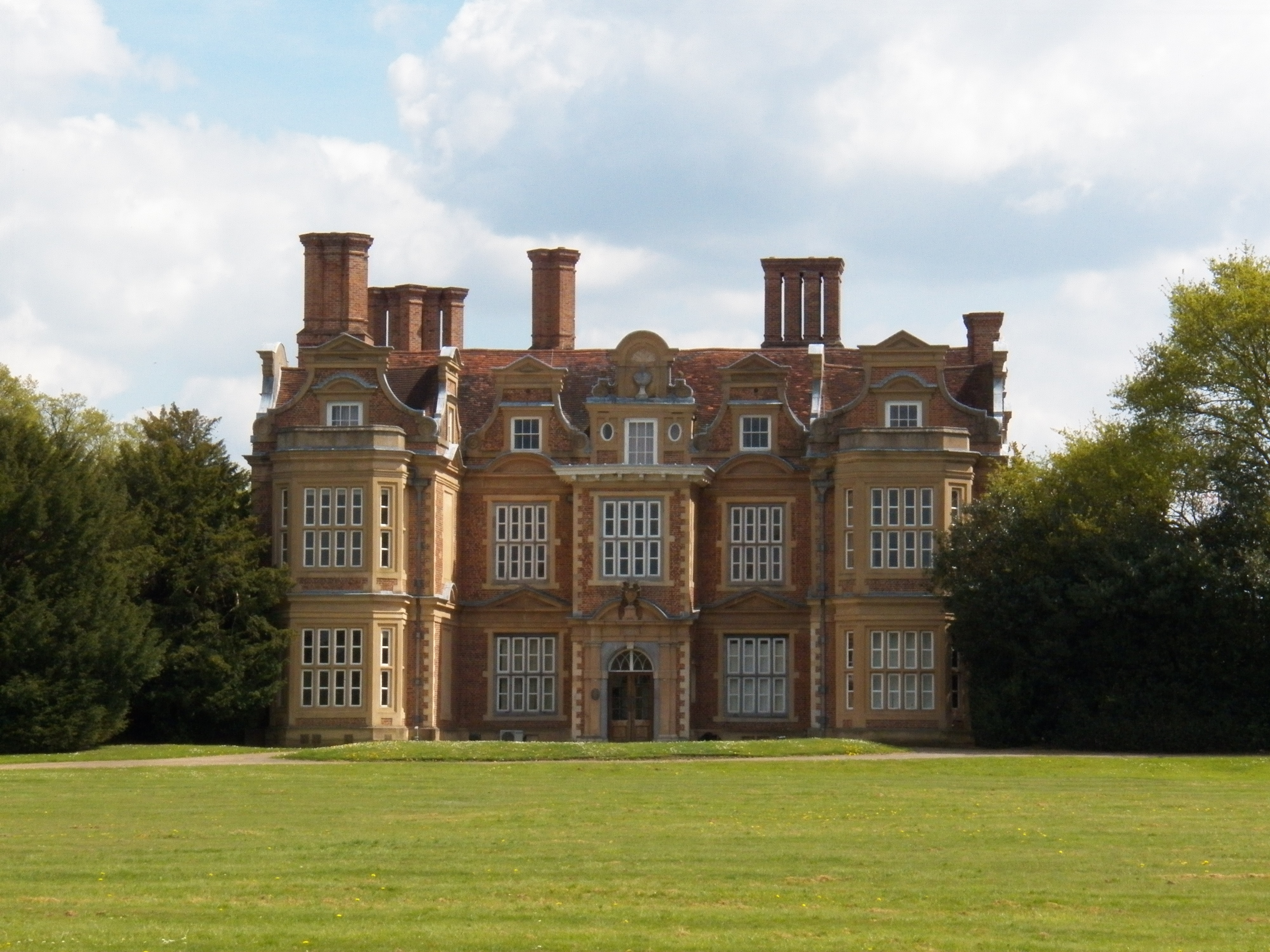
Swakeleys House, Ickenham

Vyner was baptized on 31 October 1686, the only son of Thomas Vyner, of Swakeleys, Middlesex and his wife Anne Leeke, daughter of Sir Francis Leeke, 1st Baronet of Newark, Nottinghamshire. He succeeded his father to Swakeleys in 1707 and inherited his extensive Lincolnshire estates, acquired by his great uncle, Charles II’s banker. He married Margaret Style, daughter of Sir Thomas Style, 2nd Baronet of Wateringbury, Kent.

== Career ==
Vyner was elected Member of Parliament for Great Grimsby in a contest at the 1710 general election. His politics were unclear, but the Tory Arthur Moore, who was returned with him he election, wrote that he was sure of his support. Vyner was not an active Member, and little was recorded of him in Parliament. In July 1712 he and Moore presented Grimsby’s address of thanks for the terms of the peace, on behalf of the High Church party. He did not stand in 1713 and next stood in 1721, when he was defeated at Grimsby. He was returned as an independent Whig MP for Lincolnshire at a by-election on 12 February 1724. He was a highly prolific speaker, and became a voluble opponent of successive administrations, acting consistently against them. He was returned again at the 1727 and 1734 general elections. In February 1741, he voted against the motion for Walpole’s removal.

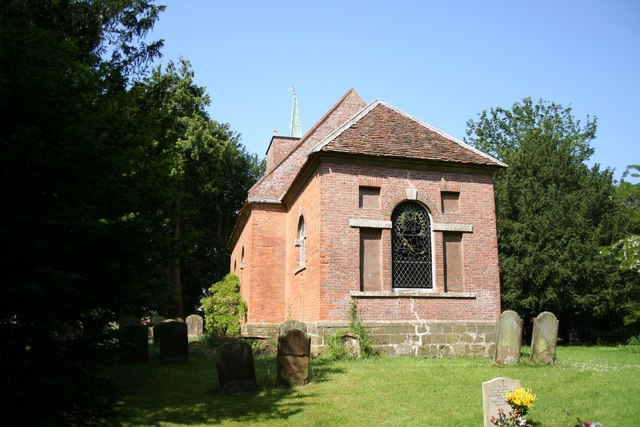
Church of All Saints, Gautby

In 1741, Vyner sold the family mansion at Swakeleys to Benjamin Lethieullier and moved to Gautby Hall in Lincolnshire,. which was probably designed and built for him by Matthew Brettingham. Gautby parish church was rebuilt in 1754 as a family chapel of the Vyner family. It is a Grade II* listed building, red brick, incorporating some medieval work. Vyner installed in the church two reclining statues from St Mary Woolnoth London of Thomas Vyner and Sir Thomas Vyner, 1st Baronet, former lord mayor of London.

Vyner was returned unopposed for Lincolnshire again at the 1741 and 1747 general elections. He was described as ‘a whimsical man, full of projects of reformation, especially about the army and militia’. Horace Walpole remarked of him in 1751 that ‘the House generally suffered him to be singular in his opinion’. At the 1754 general election he was again returned unopposed for Lincolnshire. He supported Pitt and his group in opposing the Russian and Hessian subsidy treaties. On 14 June 1758 he and his son were with George Townshend, Edward Montagu, and Thomas Staunton, in a minority of five against an increase of the judges’ salaries and on 26 January 1759 he opposed Pitt’s motion for a subsidy for the King of Prussia. On 30 October 1760 he let himself be put up against Thomas Whichcot, his fellow Member for 20 years, on a joint interest with Sir John Thorold, but this proved unpopular and he withdrew from the contest at the 1761 general election in around the middle of January 1761. He did not stand again.

== Later life and legacy ==
Vyner married, as his second wife, Delicia de Pipre of Upper Brook Street, London on 3 June 1758. He died on 10 April 1777 leaving his son Robert Vyner (1717–1799) and two daughters by his first wife. Gautby Hall was occupied by the Vyner family until 1872 and was destroyed in 1874.

Parliament of Great Britain
| Preceded by Arthur Moore; William Cotesworth | Member of Parliament for Great Grimsby; 1710–1713; With: Arthur Moore | Succeeded by Arthur Moore; William Cotesworth |
| Preceded by Sir William Massingberd; Henry Heron | Member of Parliament for Lincolnshire; 1724–1761; With: Henry Heron 1724-1727; Sir Thomas Lumley Saunderson 1727-1740; Thomas Whichcot 1740-1761 | Succeeded by Lord Brownlow Bertie; Thomas Whichcot |
