= Henry Pacey =

British politician

Henry Pacey (c.1669–1729), of Boston, Lincolnshire, was a British politician who sat in the House of Commons from 1722 to 1729.

Pacey was the eldest son of Richard Pacey yeoman of West Keal and Bolingbroke, Lincolnshire, and his wife Catherine Butler, daughter of Colonel John Butler of Hundelby Lincolnshire. His father died in 169. He married Elizabeth Packharness, daughter of William Packharness of Freston, Lincolnshire. She died on. 3 April 1716 aad he married secondly to Cassandra Pindar of Kempley, Gloucestershire.

Pacey owned property in Boston. He was Mayor of Boston in 1708 and was appointed deputy recorder in 1709, holding the post until 1715. In 1711 he was appointed Receiver of land tax for part of Lincolnshire and judge of Admiralty at Boston. He was Mayor of Boston again in 1720. At the 1722 general election he was elected in a contest as a Tory Member of Parliament for Boston. He voted against the Administration on the civil list arrears in April. In 1724 he was appointed Deputy Recorder at Boston again and held the post until 1727. He was returned unopposed as MP for Boston at the 1727 general election.

Pacey died on 10 December 1729.He left six sons and three daughters by his first wife, and one son by his second wife

Parliament of Great Britain
| Preceded by Henry Heron; Richard Ellys | Member of Parliament for Boston; 1722–1729; With: Richard Ellys | Succeeded by The Lord Coleraine; Richard Ellys |
