= Tench baronets =

- Escutcheon of the Tench baronets of Low Leyton
- Creation date: 1715
- Status: extinct
- Extinction date: 1737

The Tench Baronetcy, of Low Leyton in the County of Essex, was a title in the Baronetage of Great Britain. It was created in 1715 for Fisher Tench, a financier and member of parliament for Southwark. The title became extinct on the death of the second Baronet in 1737.

== Tench baronets, of Low Leyton (1715) ==
- Sir Fisher Tench, 1st Baronet (c. 1673–1736)
- Sir Nathaniel Tench, 2nd Baronet (1697–1737)

Baronetage of Great Britain
| Preceded by Warrender baronets | Tench baronets of Low Leyton; 8 August 1715 | Succeeded by St John baronets |
