= French Commerce Bill of 1713 =

Failed piece of legislation under the Harley ministry

French Commerce Bill
- Parliament of Great Britain
- Long title: A Bill to make effectual the Eighth and Ninth Articles of the Treaty of Commerce and Navigation between Great Britain and France.
- Introduced by: Arthur Moore (Commons)

Dates
- Laid before Parliament: 9 May 1713

Status: Not passed

The French Commerce Bill of 1713 was a proposed act of Parliament of the 3rd Parliament of Great Britain which was intended to enact the commercial provisions of the Peace of Utrecht. Introduced as a major piece of legislation by the governing Tory Harley ministry, the bill sought to establish a reciprocal low-tariff trade framework between Great Britain and France. Intense opposition from domestic manufacturing lobbies, merchant guilds, and parliamentary Whigs led to its defeat in the House of Commons in June 1713.

== Background ==
In April 1713, Great Britain and France signed the Treaty of Navigation and Commerce alongside the general peace ending the War of the Spanish Succession. Articles 8 and 9 of the commercial treaty stipulated that both nations grant each other most favored nation status and reduce reciprocal import duties. To make these articles binding under domestic law, the ministry headed by Robert Harley, 1st Earl of Oxford and Earl Mortimer and Henry St John, 1st Viscount Bolingbroke presented the bill to Parliament in May 1713.

== Parliamentary debate ==
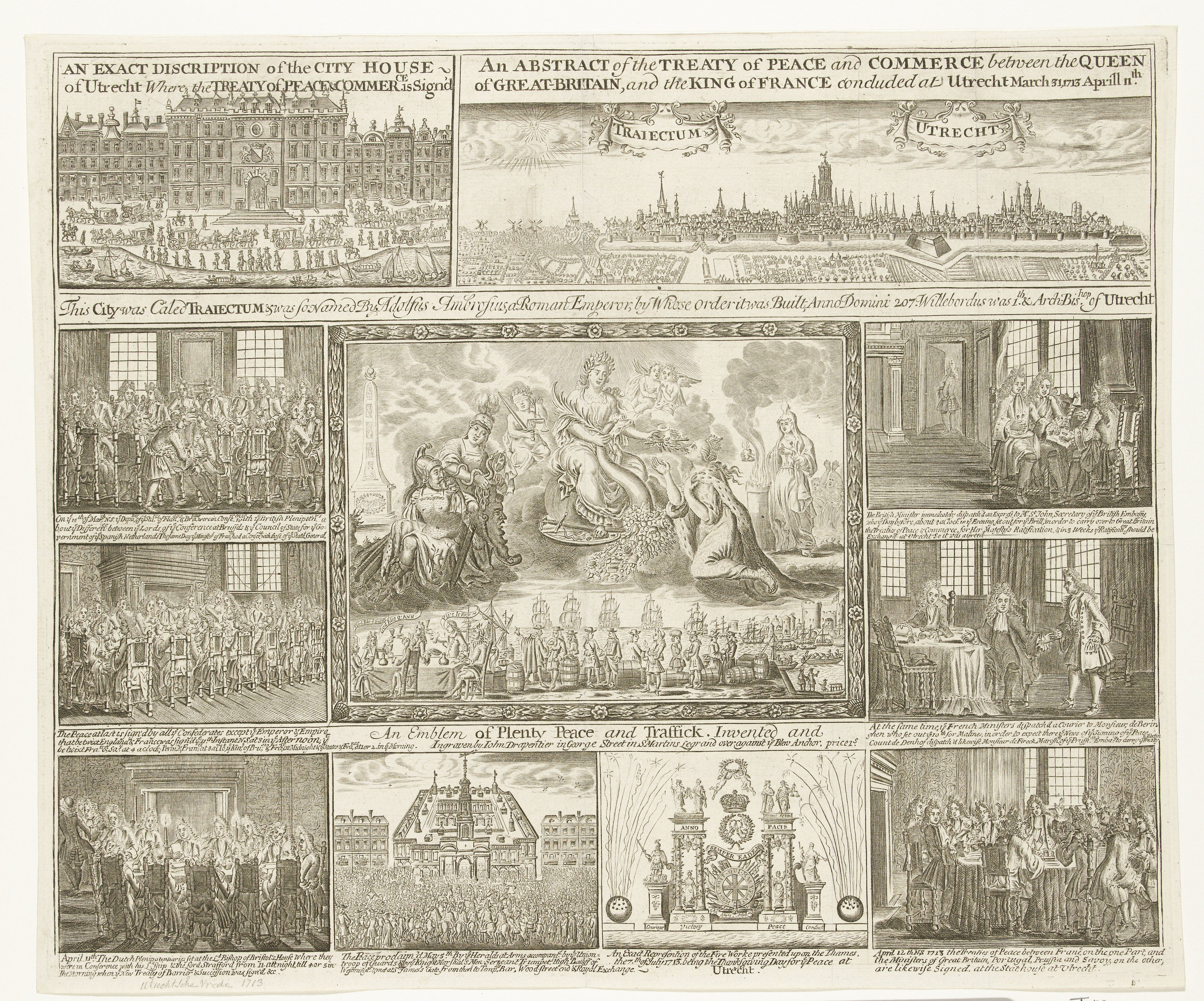
A broadsheet from 1713 summarising the Treaty of Commerce

The bill was laid before the Commons on 9 May by Arthur Moore, a Commissioner of the Board of Trade, who opened the debate and managed the bill on the floor of the House. The bill ignited an intense public and parliamentary controversy over national economic policy. Proponents, such as Robert Benson and Sir William Wyndham, 3rd Baronet, supported by government-sponsored pamphlets by writers such as Daniel Defoe, argued that lowering tariffs would expand British export markets and promote post-war diplomatic stability.

Opponents, organised by Whig politicians such as Nicholas Lechmere, Robert Walpole and James Stanhope and City of London merchant elites, waged an aggressive public campaign against the measure. They argued that cheap French luxury imports – particularly wines, silks, and linens – would devastate British textile manufacturing and create a severe trade deficit. Critics also warned that the bill undermined the Methuen Treaty of 1703, which guaranteed favorable foreign markets for English woolens in exchange for preferential duties on Portuguese wine. A Whig grandee, Lord Halifax, sponsored the publication of the British Merchant pamphlet to criticise the proposed law.

== Defeat and legacy ==
On 18 June 1713, the bill reached its third reading in the House of Commons, where it was defeated by a vote of 194 to 185. The outcome was decided when roughly 40 Tory backbenchers, led by Sir Thomas Hanmer, 4th Baronet, defected to vote with the opposition led by the Whig Junto.

The defeat represented a major political setback for Harley's administration and demonstrated the growing influence of mercantile interest groups in British politics. The defeat became a significant topic of discussion in the subsequent 1713 British general election campaign. Economically, the bill's rejection preserved a protectionist barrier between Great Britain and France, maintaining economic rivalry between the two powers until the signing of the Eden Agreement in 1786.
