= Antonio Discovolo =

Italian painter (1874–1956)

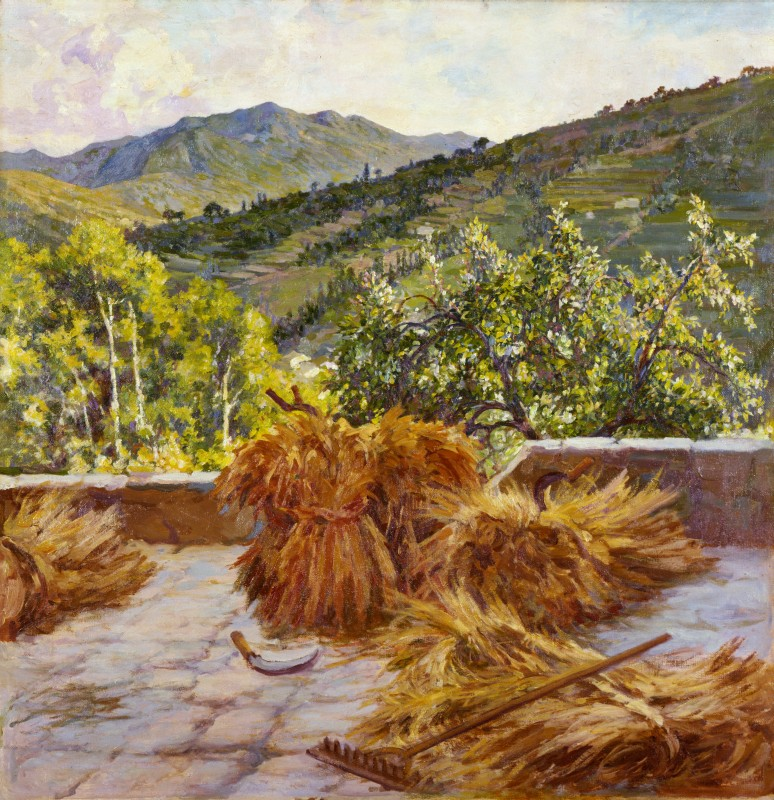
Grano, 1931 (Fondazione Cariplo)

Antonio Discovolo (1874–1956) was an Italian painter.

== Biography ==
He was born in Bologna. After studying at the academies of Florence and Lucca from 1891 to 1896, Discovolo moved to Rome in 1899 and came into contact with Nino Costa and the Symbolist painters. His participation in the Venice Biennale began with the 5th Esposizione Internazionale d’Arte di Venezia in 1903 and continued by invitation in practically every edition up to World War II. He adopted the Divisionist style in the first decade of the 20th century and took part in the international exhibitions held in St. Louis (1904) and Milan (1906). He moved to Manarola in 1907 and then Bonassola (La Spezia). He came under the influence of the Novecento Italiano movement in the 1920s and held no fewer than five solo shows at the Galleria Pesaro in Milan between 1922 and 1938. His work after World War II was devoted above all to depictions of the countryside in the Liguria region. He died in Bonassola in 1956.

== Other projects ==
Media related to Antonio Discovolo at Wikimedia Commons
