= Sir Robert Vyner, 1st Baronet =

English banker, goldsmith and Lord Mayor of London

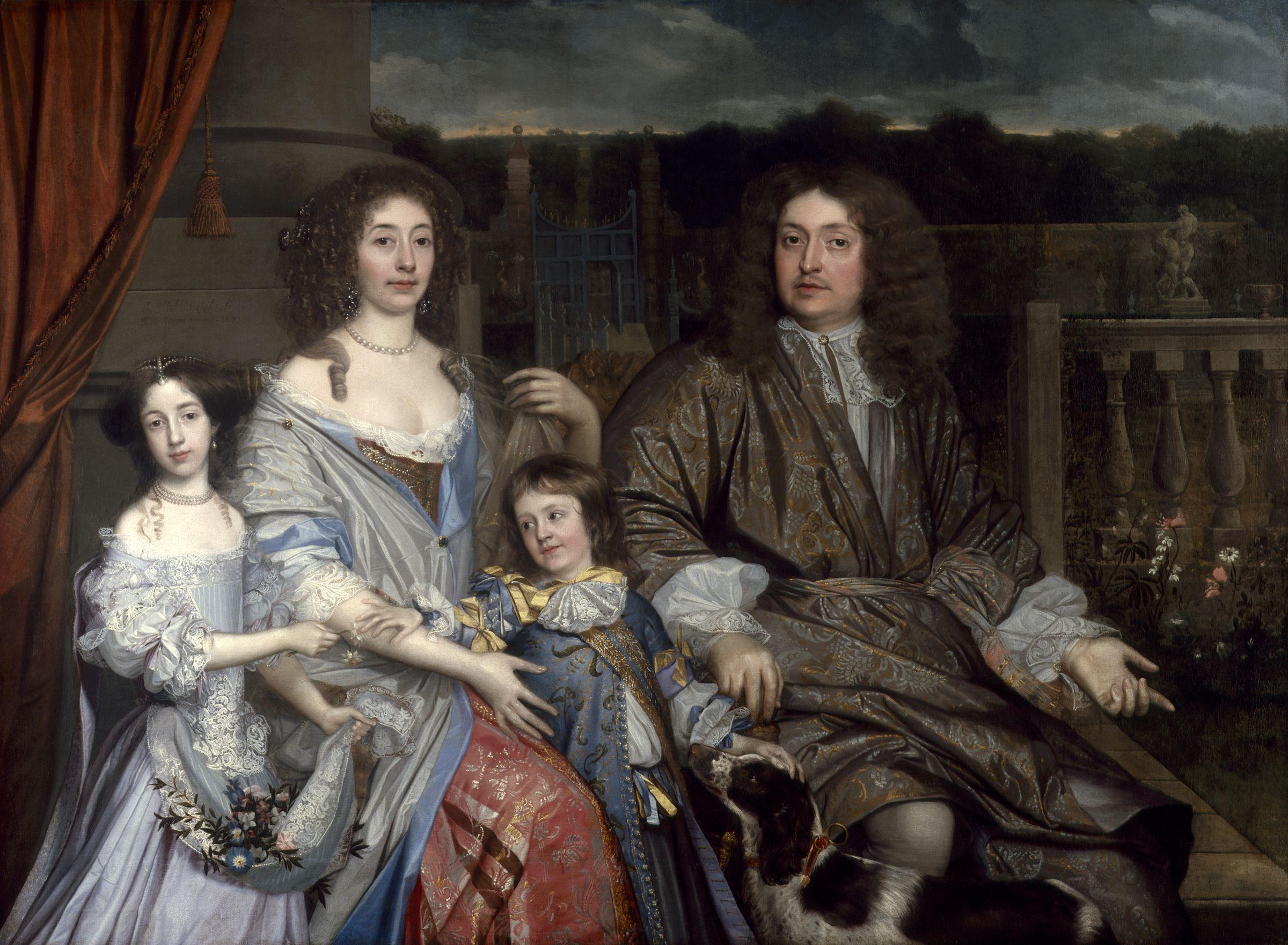
Sir Robert Viner and his family, as painted by John Michael Wright.

Sir Robert Vyner, 1st Baronet (alternatively Viner) (1631 – 2 September 1688) was an English banker, goldsmith and Lord Mayor of London.

Vyner was born in Warwick, but migrated in early life to London, where he was apprenticed to his uncle, Sir Thomas Vyner (1588–1665), a goldsmith-banker, was Lord Mayor of the City of London in 1674–1675.

== Life ==
Vyner was born in Warwick in 1631. He migrated to London in his early life.

After moving to London, Robert soon became a partner in his uncle's business, and in 1666 was elected an Alderman of the City of London; in 1665 he was made a knight, and in the following year a baronet. He was sheriff during the year of the Great Fire of London, and was chosen Lord Mayor of the City of London in 1674. Combining like his uncle the business of a banker with that of a goldsmith, Viner, who produced the jewel-studded replica of the Crown of St. Edward and the King's Orb, used for Charles II's coronation in 1661, was brought much into contact with Charles II and with the court. The king attended his mayoral banquet, and the Lord Mayor erected an equestrian statue in his honour on a spot now covered by Mansion House.

Sir Robert bought Swakeleys House in Ickenham, west of London (near its outer edge, which has one open day per year) from the wife of Sir James Harrington soon after Harrington had fled to France in 1660. Following the banquet attended by Charles II, Samuel Pepys visited the house twice to borrow money on behalf of the king. Pepys recorded in his diary how Sir Robert had shown him the body of a black boy who had worked as a servant, but had died of consumption. The body had been dried in an oven and kept in a box, which would be shown to visitors. Vyners School, a secondary school in Ickenham is named after Sir Robert. In 1659 he served as High Sheriff of Norfolk.

Having been appointed the king's goldsmith in 1661, Sir Robert was one of those who lent large sums of money for the expenses of the state and the extravagances of the court; over £400,000 was owing to him when the national exchequer suspended payment in the move called the Great Stop of the Exchequer 1672, and he was reduced to the necessity of compounding with his creditors. He obtained from the state an annuity of £25,000.

Viner was a signatory to The Several Declarations of The Company of Royal Adventurers of England Trading into Africa, a document published in 1667 which led to the creation of the Royal Africa Company.

In 1680 he gained the title of Bidston Hill, 100 acres (0.40 km2) of heathland and woodland, by way of mortgage. The Vyner family remained owners of the hill until 1894 when it was sold to Birkenhead Corporation.

Viner died in Windsor on 2 September 1688.

== Notes ==
Baronetage of England
New creation	Baronet (of London); 1666–1688	Extinct
