= Viscount Chaplin =

Title in the Peerage of the United Kingdom

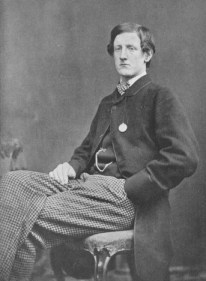
The future first Viscount Chaplin in 1859, aged 18

Viscount Chaplin, of Saint Oswald's, Blankney, in the County of Lincoln, was a title in the Peerage of the United Kingdom. It was created in 1916 for Henry Chaplin, who was a Conservative MP, cabinet minister, country landowner and racehorse owner. The title became extinct upon the death of his grandson, the third Viscount, in 1981.

The Chaplin family descended from Sir Francis Chaplin, Lord Mayor of London from 1677 to 1678. Sir Francis was the father of Robert Chaplin, who was created a baronet in 1715 (see Chaplin baronets), and John Chaplin, ancestor of the Viscounts Chaplin.

Edith Chaplin, daughter of the first Viscount, married Charles Vane-Tempest-Stewart, 7th Marquess of Londonderry, and became a well-known socialite and philanthropist. Edward Chaplin, younger brother of the first Viscount, was also a politician.

== Viscounts Chaplin (1916) ==
- Henry Chaplin, 1st Viscount Chaplin (1840–1923)
- Eric Chaplin, 2nd Viscount Chaplin (1877–1949)
- Anthony Freskyn Charles Hamby Chaplin, 3rd Viscount Chaplin (1906–1981)

== Arms ==
Coat of arms of Viscount Chaplin
Crest A griffin's head erased Or gorged with a mural coronet Vert. Escutcheon Ermine on a chief indented Vert three griffins' heads erased Or. Supporters Dexter upon a garb fesswise Proper banded Gules a hawk wings endorsed and inverted Argent beaked membered and the inside of the wings Or suspended from the neck by a riband Sable an escutcheon of the arms of Sutherland (i.e. Gules three mullets Or within a bordure of the last charged with a double tressure flory counterflory of the field). Sinister a chestnut-coloured racehorse in a white headstall banded rose colour pendant therefrom a blue lead all Proper. Motto In Coela Quies

== See also ==
- Chaplin baronets
