= Vyner baronets =

Extinct baronetcy in the Baronetage of England

The Vyner Baronetcy, of London, was a title in the Baronetage of England. It was created on 18 June 1661 for Thomas Vyner, Lord Mayor of London in 1653. The title became extinct upon the early death of the third Baronet in 1683. The third son, Sir Robert Vyner, 1st Baronet (a separate baronetcy from his uncle's) (1631–88) was also Lord Mayor of London.

The Vyners were a family of Warwickshire gentry. William Vyner (1570–1639), elder brother of the first Baronet, had four sons. The elder, Samuel (1627–59), was the grandfather of Robert Vyner (1765–1823), barrister, whose elder daughter Jane married Sir Theophilus Biddulph, 6th baronet. A younger daughter of Robert's, Delicia, married the future Field Marshal Leonhard Graf von Blumenthal, and was thus one of a clique of English wives (including Princess Victoria) who influenced the Prussian military to adopt liberal political views. William's second son Thomas (1629–73) was Dean of Gloucester.

== Vyner baronets, of London (1661) ==
- Sir Thomas Vyner, 1st Baronet (c. 1587–1665)
- Sir George Vyner, 2nd Baronet (c. 1639–1673)
- Sir Thomas Vyner, 3rd Baronet (1664–1683)

== Vyner baronets (1666) ==
- Sir Robert Vyner, 1st Baronet (1631–1688) extinct on his death
