= Antonio Salvetti =

Italian architect and painter (1854–1931)

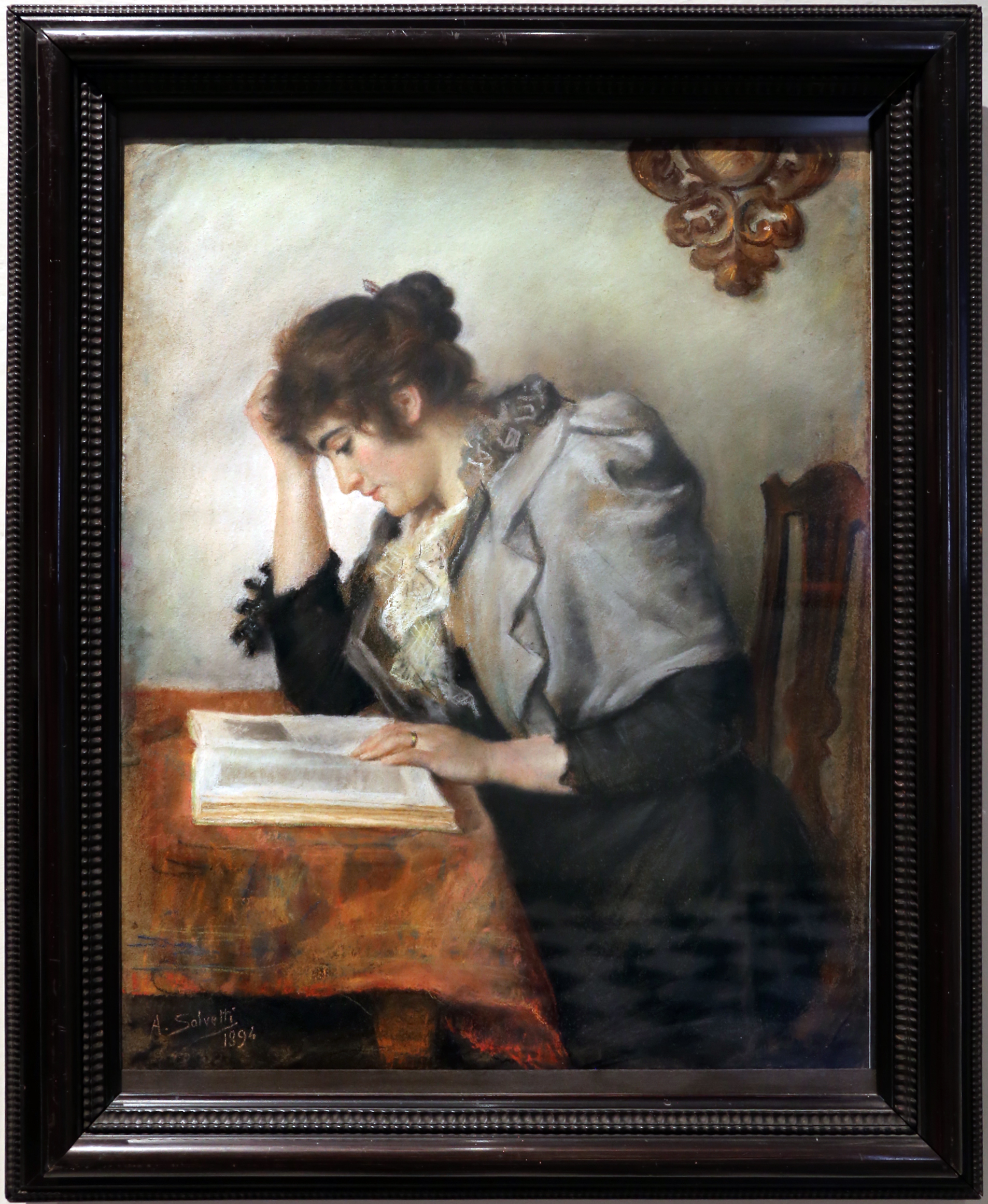
La Lettura, c. 1894

Antonio Salvetti (1854 – August 17, 1931) was an Italian architect and painter.

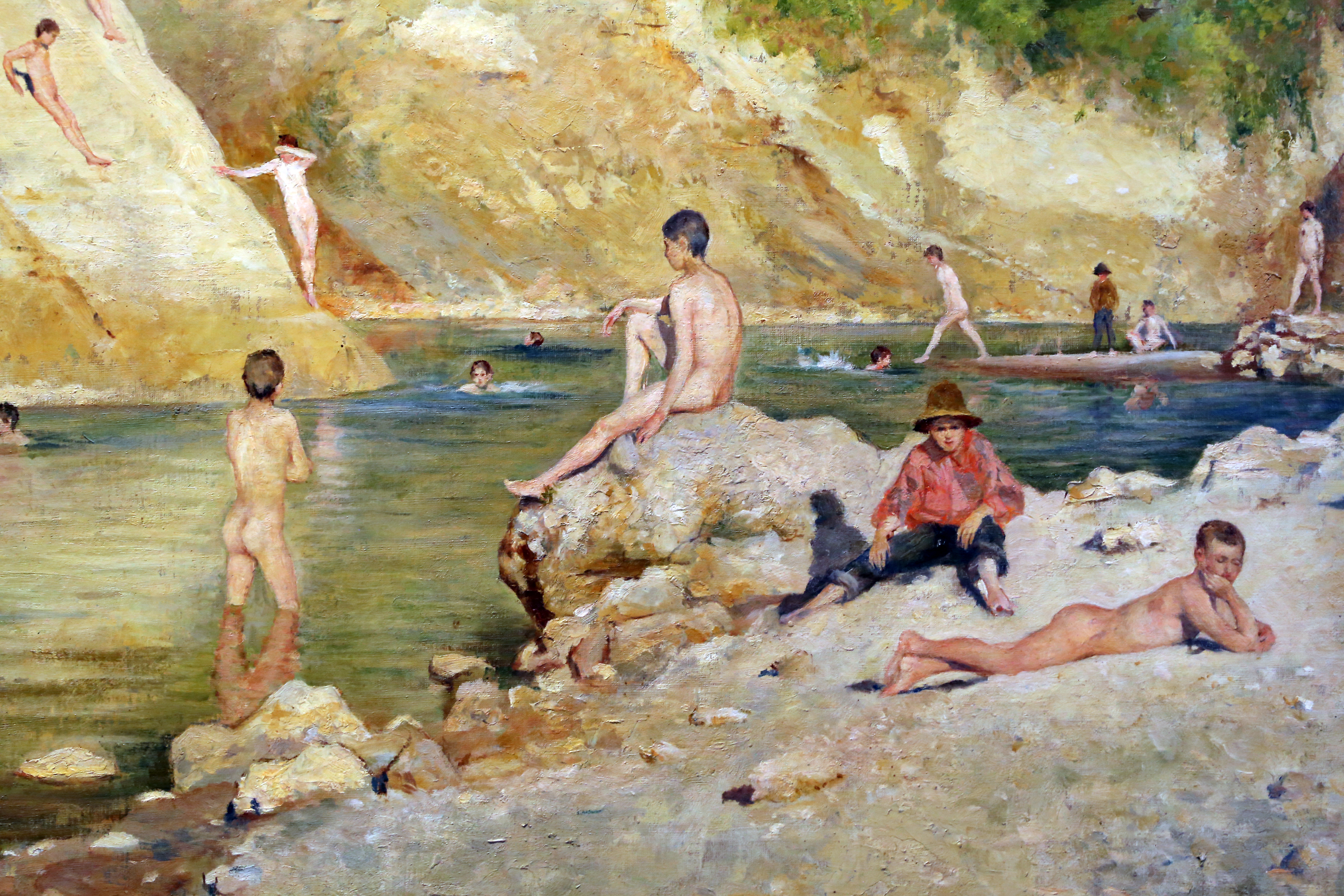
La Nicchia (estate sulle rive dell'Elsa), c. 1894

He was born in Colle di Val d'Elsa in Tuscany. He studied Architecture at the Accademia di Belle Arti di Firenze, specializing in portraits. He lived for long periods of time in Paris and Munich. In Florence, he befriended many of the Macchiaioli painters, including Vittorio Meoni, Niccolò Cannicci, and Telemaco Signorini.

He painted many portraits, including in pastel, and many studies of painting. He returned to Italy, settling in Lombardy for a spell. In 1878 in Florence, he won awards for his architectural designs. He made many designs for the Ricordi di Architettura. In the 1888 Bologna Exhibition, he was awarded a medal. Salvetti's principal works include the following canvases: Casa Calzaveglio in Brescia; Napoletana of Venice; Portrait (pastel); Profilo di donna; study of a child; portrait of a signora; Love Letter; Guida Alpina Tirolese; Study of Head in pastel; La Nonna (pastel); Pastel self-portrait; Alla finestra (pastel); and Near the Crib.

== See also ==
- Il pittore Antonio Salvetti – Consigliere comunale e Sindaco di Colle di Val d’Elsa 1895-1899, monograph by Meris Mezzedimi.

== Gallery ==
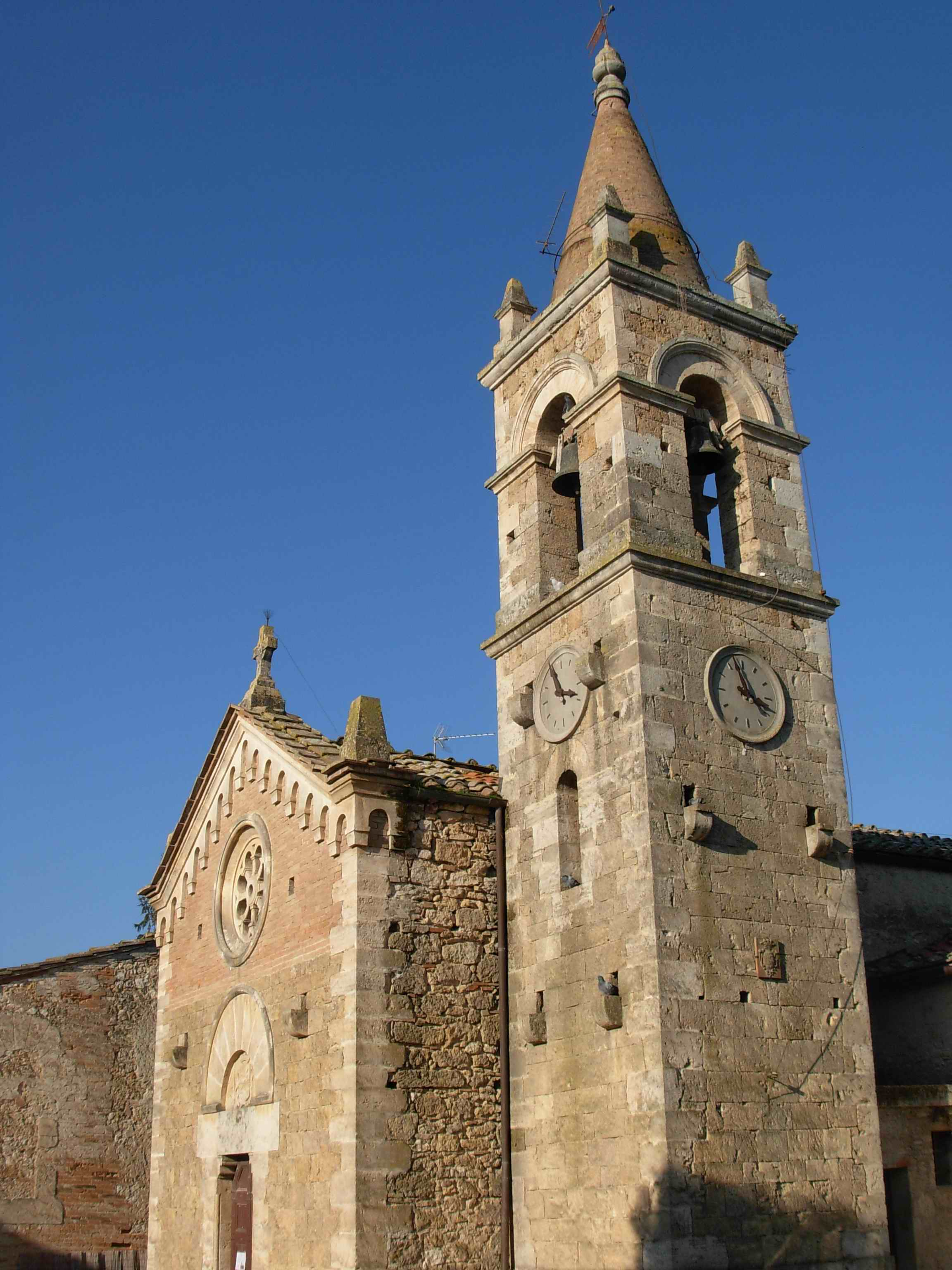
The Church of Mensanello

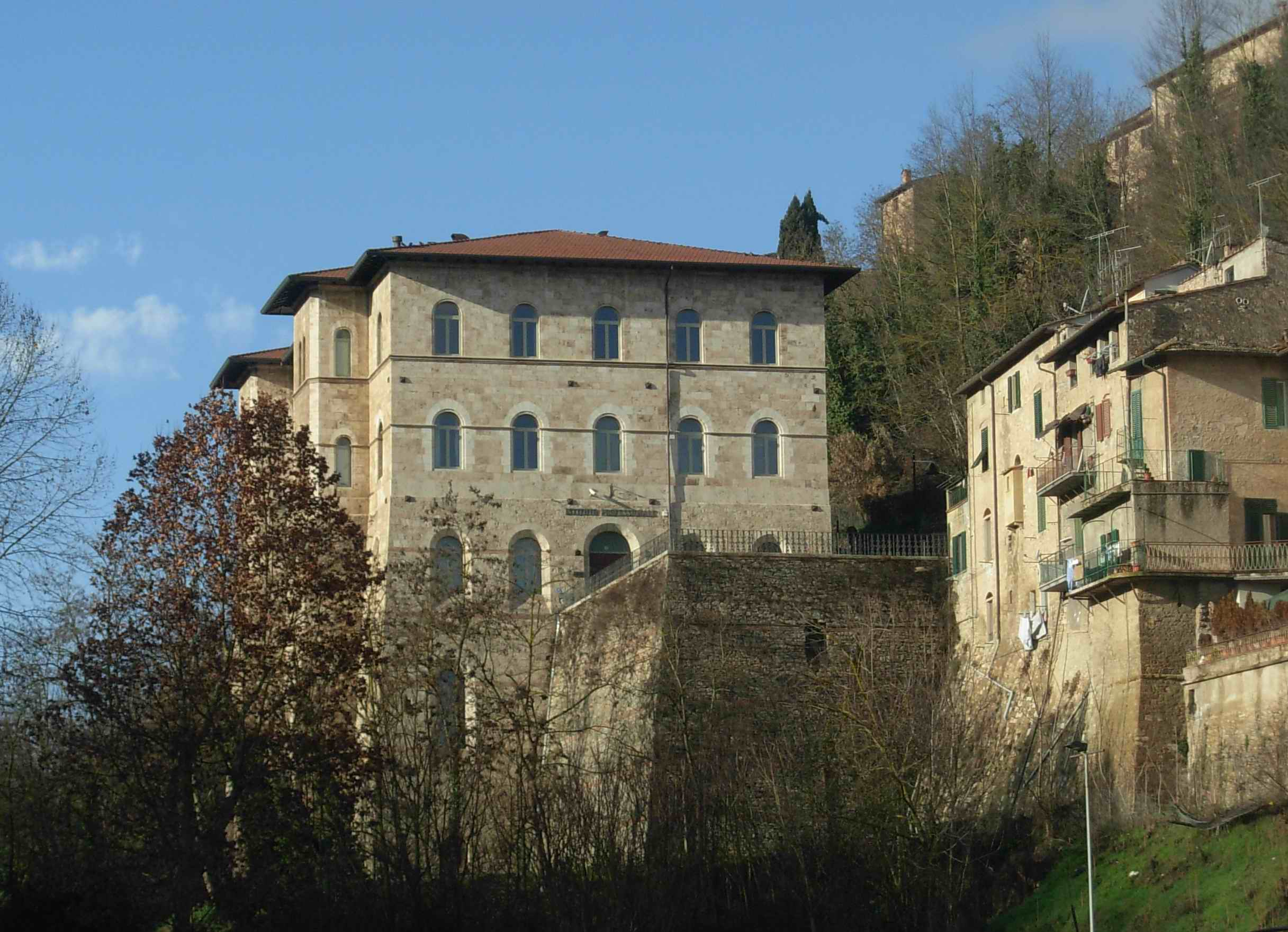
Colle di Val d'Elsa: School Palace

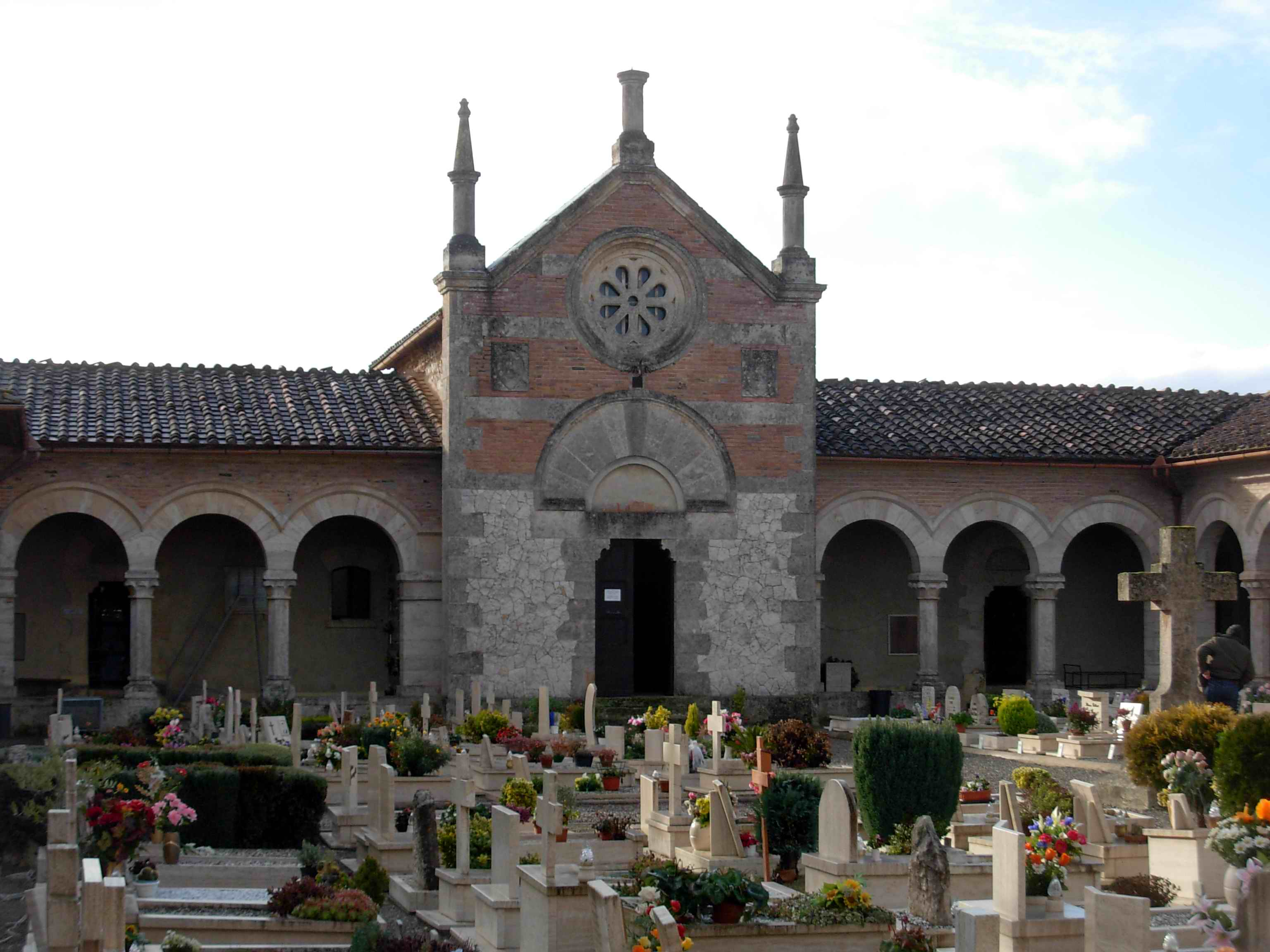
Colle di Val d'Elsa: Cemetery of the Misericordia

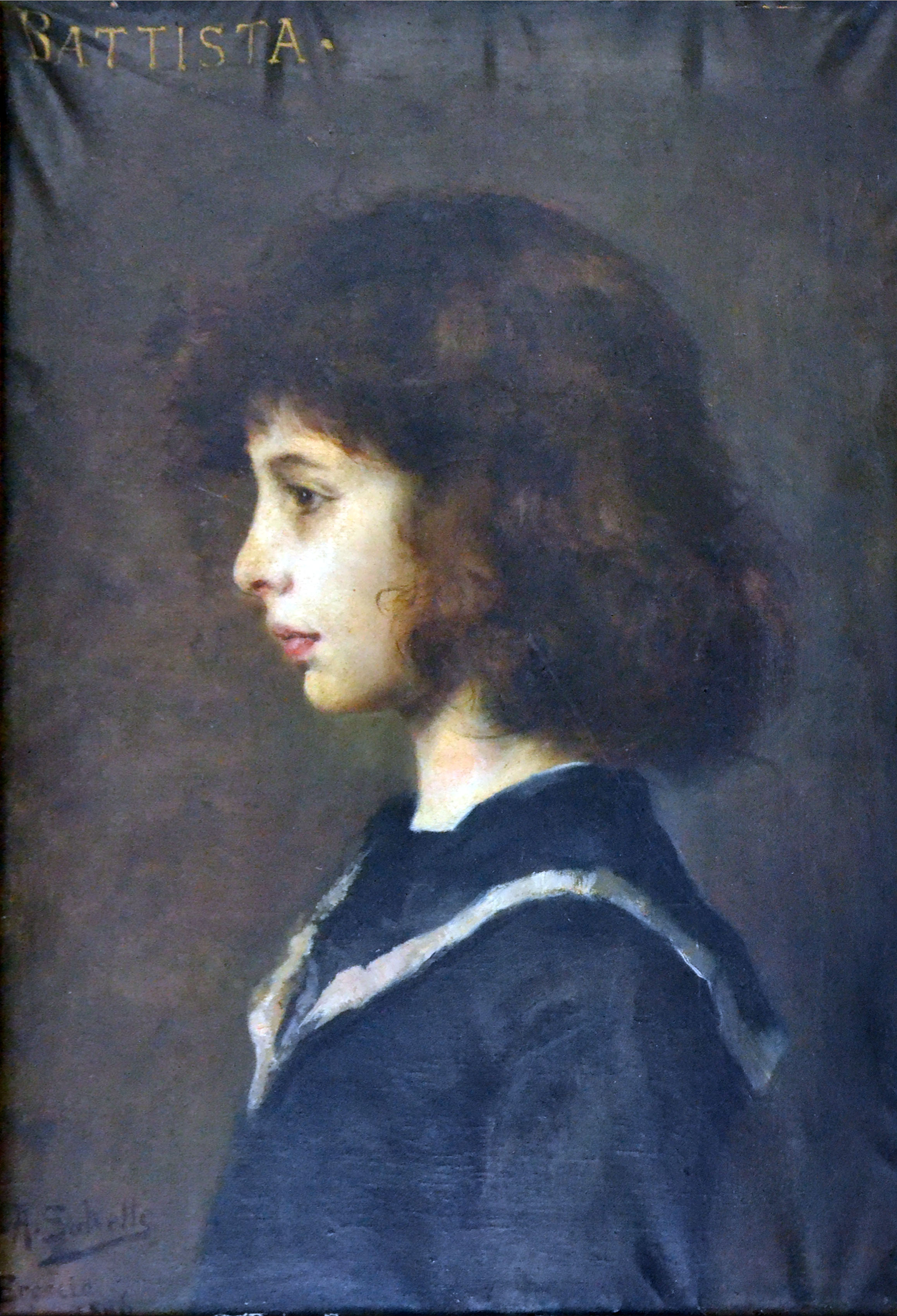
Battista, Brescia 1886
