= Thomas Throckmorton (died 1615) =

English politician

Member of Parliament for Warwickshire
- In office 1558–1558

Member of Parliament for Warwick
- In office 1559–1559

Personal details
- Born: 1533
- Died: March 1618 (aged 84–85)

Thomas Throckmorton (1533 – March 1618) was an English politician, a Member (MP) of the Parliament of England for Warwickshire in 1558 and Warwick in 1559. He spent much of his life undergoing fines and long periods of imprisonment for recusancy. He resided primarily at Weston Underwood, Buckinghamshire.

== Family ==
Throckmorton was the son of Sir Robert Throckmorton (c. 1513 – 1581) and Muriel Berkeley (fl. 1516 – c. 1541). Thomas married, c. 1556, Margaret (or Mary) Whorwood (1533 – 28 April 1607), daughter of Sir William Whorwood by whom he had one son, John, and four daughters, Elizabeth, Margaret, Eleanor, and Meriel. John Throckmorton was the father of, among others, Robert Throckmorton, 1st Baronet (1599–1650), who was Thomas' heir at his death.

== Gunpowder Plot ==
According to a Warwickshire website, Thomas Throckmorton went abroad before the Gunpowder Plot (1605), but he let Coughton Court to one of the conspirators, Sir Everard Digby. Throckmorton was not implicated in the plot, but fines for recusancy, previously waived, were reimposed.

== Disambiguation ==
Thomas Throckmorton is the name of various historical figures. He is the eldest son of Anthony Throckmorton, a mercer of St. Martin's Lane, Westminster and Chastleton, Oxfordshire; Thomas married Julian, the widow of Thomas Wye of Lypiatt. They did not have any children.
