= Giuseppe Viner =

Italian painter

Giuseppe Vìner (18 October 1875 - 5 October 1925) was an Italian painter, active in depicting rural country landscapes in the style of the Macchiaioli and later in Divisionism.

== Biography ==
He was born in Seravezza, province of Lucca, in present Tuscany. His main work is a triptych called Terra Madre, now split between the Galleria d'Arte Moderna in Florence, a museum of Budapest, and a private collection in Düsseldorf. He committed suicide in his home in Castelverde in Versilia.
