= Sir Thomas Vyner, 1st Baronet =

English merchant and politician (1588–1655)

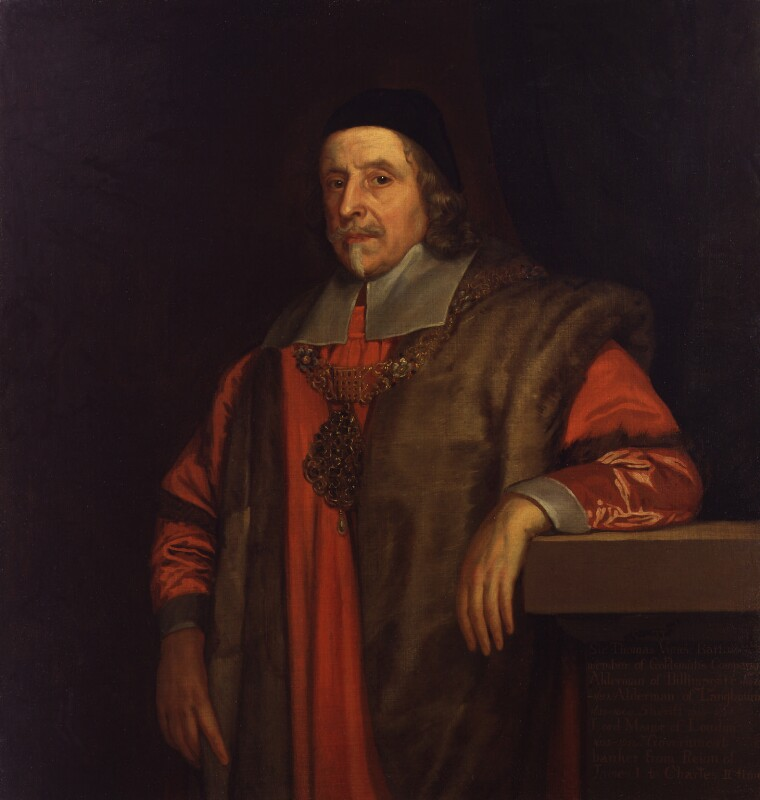

Lord Mayor of London
- In office 1653–1654
- Preceded by: John Fowke
- Succeeded by: Sir Christopher Packe

Personal details
- Born: 15 December 1588
- Died: 11 May 1665 (aged 76)
- Children: 6; 4 daughters and 2 sons

Sir Thomas Vyner, 1st Baronet (15 December 1588 – 11 May 1665) was an English merchant and politician who served as the Lord Mayor of London in 1653.

== Biography ==
Vyner supplied gold bullion to two English kings and to the Protectorate of Oliver Cromwell. Born at North Cerney, Gloucestershire, on 15 December 1588, Vyner was the son of Thomas and Anne Vyner. After his father's death in 1600, Vyner was sent to London to live with his sister and brother-in-law, Samuel Moore.

Samuel Moore introduced Vyner to the goldsmithing trade. Vyner soon became a member of the Worshipful Company of Goldsmiths and later became its prime warden. In 1622, Vyner purchased a mansion in what was then the village of Hackney near London. On 8 July 1624, James I appointed Vyner to the office of comptroller of the mint. Under the regime of Oliver Cromwell, Vyner supplied large quantities of gold bullion to and created coinage for both the English government and the East India Company. In 1656, he and a partner purchased a large quantity of Spanish bullion to be converted into coins.

As Vyner became more successful in business, he started venturing into politics. In 1646, he was elected alderman of the Billingsgate ward of London, a post he would hold until 1651. In 1648, he was elected sheriff. In 1651, Vyner ran for election as alderman in the Langbourn ward. In 1653, he became the Lord Mayor of London. That same year, Vyner was knighted by Cromwell. In 1660, with the loss of his post as alderman, Vyner appears to have retired from public service. On 18 June 1661, Charles II made Vyner a baronet. Vyner died in Hackney on 11 May 1665. He was buried in St Mary Woolnoth church in Langbourn, although his monument was moved by his great nephew Robert Vyner to Gautby.

== Family ==
Vyner had three wives, four daughters, and two sons. He was succeeded in the baronetcy by his son George. George remained living in Hackney until his death in 1673. George's son and heir, Thomas, was baptised at St John's church, Hackney, in 1664.

== Notes ==
Civic offices
Preceded by John Fowke	Lord Mayor of London; 1653– 1654	Succeeded by Sir Christopher Packe
Baronetage of England
New creation	Baronet (of London); 1661–1665	Succeeded by George Vyner
