= Wyham cum Cadeby =

Depopulated civil parish in the East Lindsey district of Lincolnshire, England

Coordinates: 53.435880°N 0.06964°W

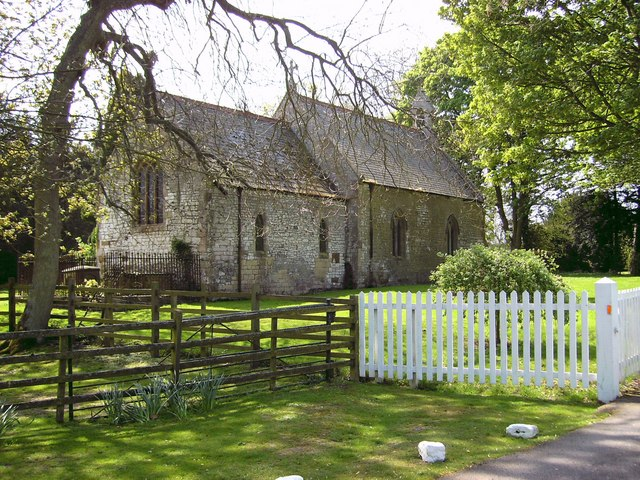
- All Saints church, Wyham

- Location within Lincolnshire
- OS grid reference: TF283949
  - London: 140 mi (230 km) S
- District: East Lindsey
- Shire county: Lincolnshire
- Region: East Midlands
- Country: England
- Sovereign state: United Kingdom
- Post town: Grimsby
- Postcode district: DN36
- Police: Lincolnshire
- Fire: Lincolnshire
- Ambulance: East Midlands
- UK Parliament: Louth and Horncastle (UK Parliament constituency)

Wyham cum Cadeby (otherwise Wyham with Caldeby) is a depopulated civil parish in the East Lindsey district of Lincolnshire, England. The nearest village is Ludborough (where any remaining population is included), about 1 mile (1.6 km) to the east on the A16 road, and the nearest town, Louth, 5 miles (8 km) to the south.

Wyham cum Cadeby consists of the remaining hamlet of Wyham (grid reference TF277951) and the former village of Cadeby, otherwise North Cadeby (TF271960,), both settlements a deserted medieval village.

The parish church, dedicated to All Saints, once seated 90. It was restored in 1886 and declared redundant and sold in 1982. The parish records are held in Lincoln.

There is a former chalk quarry which has been converted to a clay and skeet shooting ground.
