= William Cotesworth =

William Cotesworth (1665–1730), of St James Clerkenwell, Middlesex, was a Member of Parliament for Great Grimsby 10 January – 6 March 1701, December 1701 – 1702, 1705–1710 and 1713–1715, and for Boston 20 December 1711 – 20 March 1712 and 2 April 1712 – 1713.
