= Anthony Irby (died 1625) =

English lawyer and politician

Anthony Irby (1547 – 6 October 1625) was an English lawyer and politician who sat in the House of Commons at various times between 1589 and 1622.

== Background ==
Irby was the only son of Thomas Irby of Whaplode and his wife Isabel Serjeant, daughter of Thomas Serjeant. He matriculated from Gonville and Caius College, Cambridge in 1559 and was called to the bar by Lincoln's Inn in 1569. His uncle was Leonard Irby. He was commissioner for sewers in Lincolnshire in 1564.

== Career ==
Irby became recorder and town clerk of Stamford, Lincolnshire. In 1588 some of the burgesses of Stamford terminated his appointment as recorder and possibly as a result, when he was elected Member of Parliament (MP) that year, it was for Boston. After making enquiries in January 1589, the Privy Council ordered in March that Irby, "a gentleman of good discretion, credit and learning", should be reinstated as recorder of Stamford, although this only happened after the burgesses were given two warnings. He became a bencher of his Inn in 1591 and Autumn Reader a year later. He was re-elected MP for Boston in 1592, and again in 1597 and 1601 during the rule of Elizabeth I. He was re-elected MP for Boston in 1604 after James I had become King. He was appointed recorder of Boston in 1613, a post he held until his death in 1625. In 1614 he was elected MP for Boston again in the Addled Parliament and was re-elected in 1621. He became a Master in Chancery in about 1621.

== Family ==
On 22 December 1575, he married the widow Alice Tash, daughter of Thomas Welbye. They had five sons and two daughters. Irby was buried at Whapload.

=== Anthony (1577–1610) ===
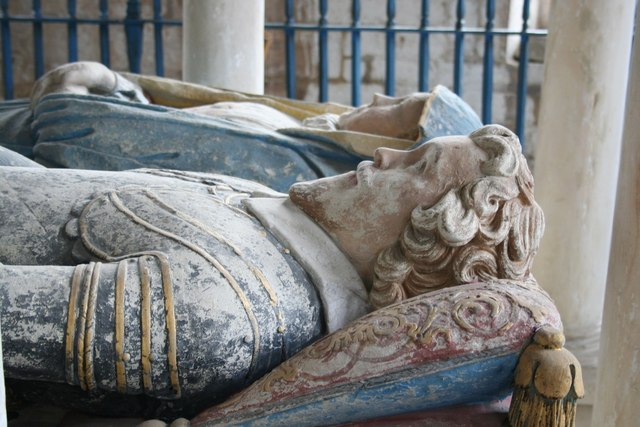
Tomb of Sir Anthony Irby, Whaplode church, Lincolnshire

His oldest surviving son Anthony (1577–1610) sat also in the Parliament of England. Irby was knighted by James I on 23 July 1603. Anthony was also an investor in the Virginia Company. Some sources state he was a Member of Parliament for Boston in 1604, but that was probably his father.

In February 1603, he married Elizabeth Peyton, third daughter of Sir John Peyton, 1st Baronet. They had three sons and two daughters. His oldest son Anthony was Sheriff of Lincolnshire and represented Boston in the Parliament of England. Alice married first Major Francis Jermy of Gunton Hall and secondly Major Edmund de Grey of Merton Hall son of Sir William de Grey and lady Anne Calthorpe daughter of Sir James Calthorpe sheriff of Norfolk.

According to Collins, Anthony died aged 32 in 1610, and is buried in Whaplode Church, where he has a 10-poster tomb. The inscription on the tomb reads: "Heere lieth buried Sr Anthonie Irby Knight sonne of Anthonie Irby esquire and Alice his wife daughter of Thomas Welbie esquire which Sr Anthonie tooke to wife, Elizabeth daughter of Sr John Peyton of Iselham in the countie of Cambridge knight and baronet of the noble race of the Uffordes sometimes Earls of Suffolk by whome he had issue Sr Anthonie Irby knight Edward Thomas Alice and Elizabeth who died an infant; Sr Anthonie the eldest married his first wife Fraunces daughter of Sir William Wray knight and baronet and Fraunces bis wife daughter and coheire to Sir William Drury of Halsted in Suffolk; his second Margaret daughter of Sr Richard Smith of the countie of Kent knight."

Parliament of England
Preceded by Vincent Skinner; Richard Stevenson	Member of Parliament for Boston; 1589–1622; With: Vincent Skinner 1589; Richard Stevenson 1592–1597; Henry Capell 1601; Francis Bullingham 1604; Leonard Bawtree 1614; Sir William Airmine 1621–1622	Succeeded by Sir William Airmine; William Boswell
