= Edward Barkham =

Edward Barkham may refer to:

- Sir Edward Barkham (Lord Mayor) (died 1634), Lord Mayor of London 1621–1622
- Sir Edward Barkham, 1st Baronet, of South Acre (c. 1595–1667), MP, son of the above
- Sir Edward Barkham, 2nd Baronet, of South Acre (1628–1688), son of the above, of the Barkham baronets
- Sir Edward Barkham, 1st Baronet, of Wainflete (1631–1669), Sheriff of Lincolnshire, grandson of Sir Edward Barkham (died 1634)
- Sir Edward Barkham, 3rd Baronet, of Wainflete (c. 1680–1711), grandson of the above, of the Barkham baronets

== See also ==
- Barkham (surname)
