= Garfit =

Garfit is a surname. Notable people with the surname include:

- Maude Garfit (1874–1948), English tennis player
- Thomas Garfit (1815–1883), English politician
- William Garfit (1840–1920), English banker and politician

== See also ==
- Elyes Garfi (born 1993), Tunisian volleyball player
