= John Studholme Brownrigg =

British politician

Member of Parliament for Boston
- In office 1835–1847 Serving with John Wilks, Sir James Duke
- Preceded by: John Wilks; Benjamin Handley
- Succeeded by: Sir James Duke; Benjamin Bond Cabbell

Personal details
- Born: 17 March 1786
- Died: 1853
- Party: Conservative
- Spouse: Elizabeth Rebecca Cassamaijor (m. 1812)
- Relations: Robert Brownrigg (uncle)
- Children: 3
- Parent(s): Lydia Eames; John Studholme Brownrigg

John Studholme Brownrigg (17 March 1786 – 1853) was an English merchant and British Conservative Party politician who sat in the House of Commons from 1835 to 1847.

== Early life ==
Brownrigg was born on 17 March 1786 in Windsor. He was the third son of Lydia (née Eames) Brownrigg, of Boston, Massachusetts, and Lt. John Studholme Brownrigg (1754–1787) of the 38th Foot. His paternal uncle was Sir Robert Brownrigg, 1st Baronet, the Governor of British Ceylon.

== Career ==
An East India Company military cadet of the 1800 season, he arrived in India in August 1801 and was commissioned ensign in the 12th Bengal Native Infantry in November 1801, being promoted to Lieutenant in September 1803.

He served under General Lake with the 12th N.I. in the Second Mahratta War, being present at the Battle of Laswarree, on 1 November 1803, "as fierce a fight as was ever fought by men." In 1851, he received the Army of India Medal with clasp for Laswarree.

Brownrigg transferred to the 8th N.I., and was Adjutant and Quartermaster of that unit between 1805 and 1810. He served in the capture of Java in August 1811 but neither claimed nor received the medal for that campaign. He was also Secretary to the Military Board from February 1813 until his resignation from the army in April 1820, having been promoted Captain in February 1815.

After his HEIC army service, Brownrigg became a London merchant and partner in Charles Cockerill & Co. He was also a director of the Royal Bank of Australasia and deputy governor of the Australian Agricultural Company.

Captain Brownrigg was an unsuccessful candidate for the borough of Boston in the 1832 general election but was elected in the 1835 election and re-elected in the 1837 and 1841 elections. Captain Brownrigg represented Boston as a Member of Parliament until his retirement in 1847.

== Personal life ==
On 11 December 1812, he married Elizabeth Rebecca Cassamaijor, a daughter of James Henry Cassamaijor, Esq. Together, they were the parents of:

- John Studholme Brownrigg (1814–1889), a General who fought in the Crimean War; he married Katharine Williams-Wynn, daughter of Sir Henry Williams-Wynn, in 1840. After her death, he married Beatrice Laura Desanges, daughter of Louis William Desanges.
- Sophia Ann Brownrigg (1816–1906), who married Sir Charles Alexander Wood, son of Thomas Wood, MP for Breconshire and aide-de-camp to Queen Victoria, in 1838.
- Jane Agnes Brownrigg (1818–1891), who married Sir John Harington, 10th Baronet, son of Sir James Harington, 9th Baronet, in 1846.

He died at home in Middlesex in September 1853.

Parliament of the United Kingdom
Preceded by John Wilks; Benjamin Handley	Member of Parliament for Boston; 1835–1847; With: John Wilks 1835–37; Sir James Duke 1837–49	Succeeded by Sir James Duke; Benjamin Bond Cabbell
