= Richard Bellingham =

Governor of the Massachusetts Bay Colony

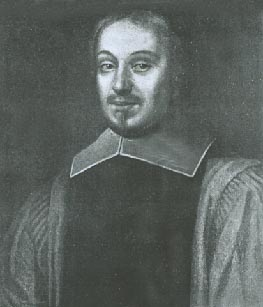

8th, 16th, and 18th Governor of the Massachusetts Bay Colony
- In office 1641–1642
- Monarch: Charles I
- Preceded by: Thomas Dudley
- Succeeded by: John Winthrop
- In office 1654–1655
- Lord Protector: Oliver Cromwell
- Preceded by: John Endecott
- Succeeded by: John Endecott
- In office 1665–1672
- Monarch: Charles II
- Preceded by: John Endecott
- Succeeded by: John Leverett

Personal details
- Born: c. 1592 Boston, Lincolnshire, England
- Died: 7 December 1672 (aged 79–80) Boston, Massachusetts Bay Colony

Richard Bellingham (c. 1592 – 7 December 1672) was a colonial magistrate, lawyer, and several-time governor of the Massachusetts Bay Colony, and the last surviving signatory of the colonial charter at his death. A wealthy lawyer in Lincolnshire prior to his departure for the New World in 1634, he was a liberal political opponent of the moderate John Winthrop, arguing for expansive views on suffrage and lawmaking, but also religiously somewhat conservative, opposing (at times quite harshly) the efforts of Quakers and Baptists to settle in the colony. He was one of the architects of the Massachusetts Body of Liberties, a document embodying many sentiments also found in the United States Bill of Rights.

Although he was generally in the minority during his early years in the colony, he served ten years as colonial governor, most of them during the delicate years of the English Restoration, when King Charles II scrutinized the behavior of the colonial governments. Bellingham notably refused a direct order from the king to appear in England, an action that may have contributed to the eventual revocation of the colonial charter in 1684.

He was twice married. He died in 1672, leaving an estate in present-day Chelsea, Massachusetts, and a large house in Boston. The estate became embroiled in legal action lasting more than 100 years after his will was challenged by his son and eventually set aside. Bellingham is immortalized in Nathaniel Hawthorne's The Scarlet Letter and Henry Wadsworth Longfellow's The New England Tragedies, both of which fictionalize events from colonial days.

== Early life ==
Coat of Arms of Richard Bellingham

Richard Bellingham, the son of William Bellingham and Frances Amcotts, was born in Lincolnshire, England, in about 1592. The family was apparently well to do; they resided in a manor at Brumby Wood near Scunthorpe. He studied law at Brasenose College, Oxford, matriculating on 1 December 1609. In 1625 he was elected Recorder (the highest community legal post) of Boston, a position he held until 1633. He represented Boston as a member of Parliament in 1628 and 1629. He was first married to Elizabeth Backhouse of Swallowfield, Berkshire, with whom he had a number of children, although only their son Samuel survived to adulthood.

In 1628 he became an investor in the Massachusetts Bay Company, and was one of the signers of the land grant issued to it by the Plymouth Council for New England. His name also appears on the royal charter issued for the Massachusetts Bay Colony in 1629. In 1633 he resigned as recorder of Boston and began selling off his properties. The next year he sailed for the New World with his wife and son; Elizabeth died not long after their arrival in Boston, Massachusetts.

== Massachusetts Bay Colony ==
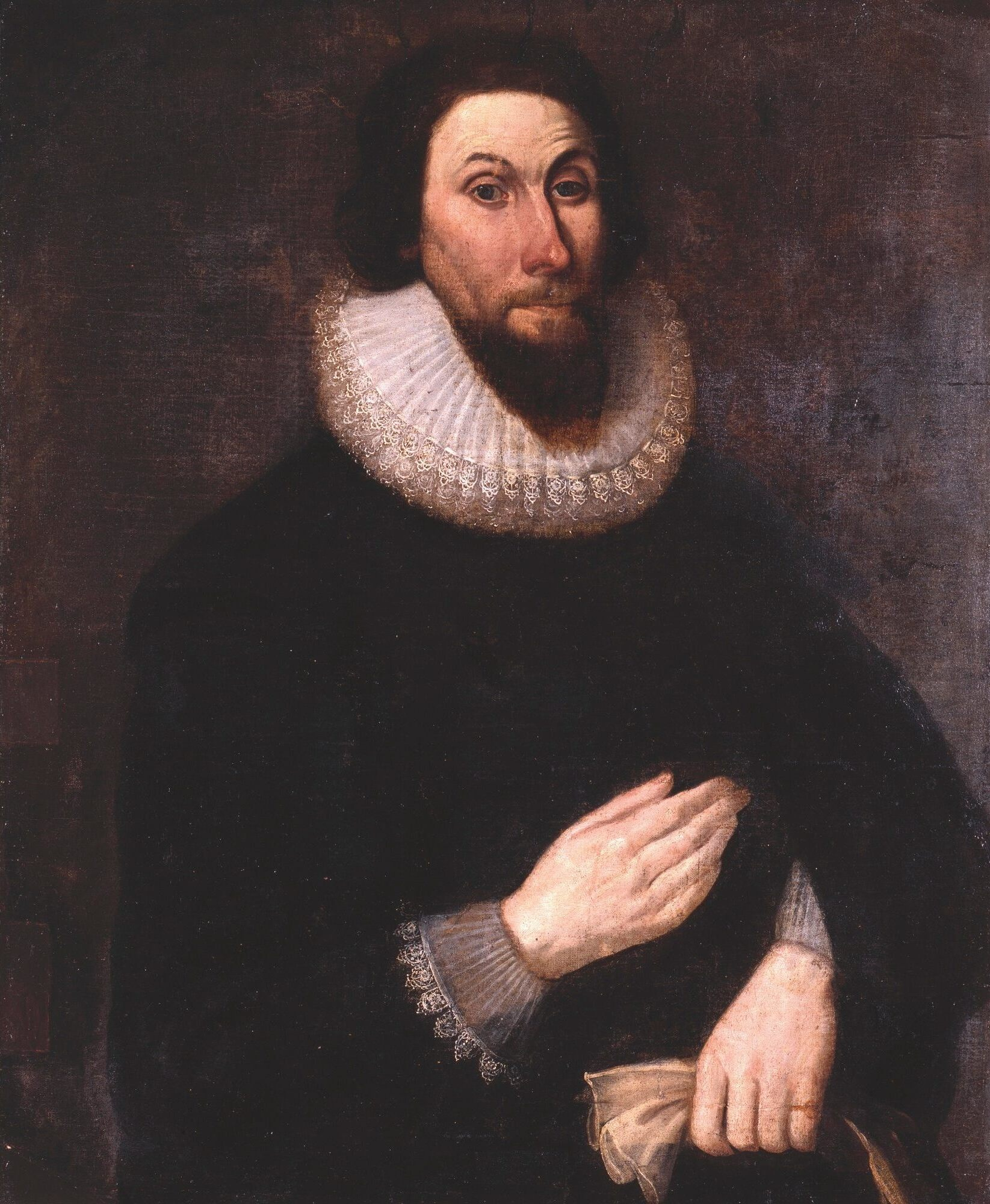
John Winthrop, with whom Bellingham often disagreed

Bellingham immediately assumed a prominent role in the colony, serving on the committee that oversaw the affairs of Boston (a precursor to the board of selectmen). In this role he participated in the division of community lands that included the establishment of Boston Common. Not long after his arrival, he purchased the ferry service between Boston and Winnessimmett (present-day Chelsea) from Samuel Maverick, along with tracts of land that encompass much of Chelsea. In addition to his mansion house in Boston, he also established a country home near the ferry in Winnessimmett. A house he built in 1659 still stands in Chelsea, and is known as the Bellingham-Cary House.

For many years he was elected to the colony's council of assistants, which advised the governor on legislative matters and served as a judicial body, and he also served several terms as colonial treasurer. He was first elected deputy governor of the colony in 1635, at a time when the dominant John Winthrop was out of favor, and was elected to the post again in 1640. In 1637, during the Antinomian Controversy, he was one of the magistrates who sat during the trial of Anne Hutchinson, and voted for her to be banished from the colony. According to historian Francis Bremer, Bellingham was somewhat brash and antagonistic, and he and Winthrop repeatedly clashed on political matters. During these early years Bellingham was chosen to be on the first board of overseers of Harvard College. He also contributed to the development of the colony's first legal code, known as the Massachusetts Body of Liberties. This work was opposed and repeatedly stalled by Winthrop, who favored a common law approach to legislation.

In 1641, Bellingham was elected governor for the first time, running against Winthrop. The Body of Liberties was formally adopted during his term. However, he served for just one year, and was replaced by Winthrop in 1642. Bellingham's defeat may have been caused in part by the scandalous impropriety surrounding his second marriage. A friend who was a guest in his house had been courting Penelope Pelham, a young woman of 20. According to Winthrop, Bellingham, now 50 and a widower, won her heart, and, without waiting for the formalities of the banns of marriage, officiated at his own wedding. When the issue came before the colonial magistrates, Bellingham (as the governor and chief magistrate) refused to step down from the bench to face the charges, thus bringing the matter to a somewhat awkward end. Bellingham's term in office was characterized by Winthrop as extremely difficult: "The General Court was full of uncomfortable agitations and contentions by reason of Bellingham's unfriendliness to some other magistrates. He set himself in an opposite frame to them in all proceedings, which did much to retard business".

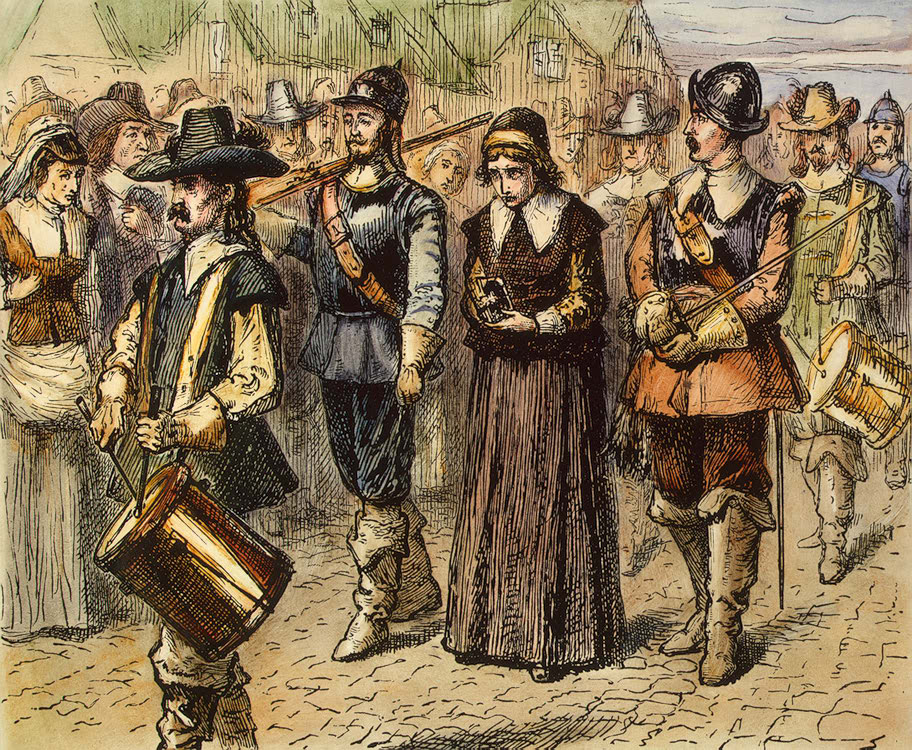
Depiction of the Quaker Mary Dyer, one of the Boston martyrs, being led to her execution

In the 1640s, constitutional issues concerning the power of the assistants arose. In a case involving an escaped pig, the assistants ruled in favor of a merchant who had allegedly taken a widow's errant animal. She appealed to the general court, which ruled in her favor. The assistants then asserted their right to veto the general court's decision, sparking the controversy. John Winthrop argued that the assistants, as experienced magistrates, must be able to check the democratic institution of the general court, because "a democracy is, amongst most civil nations, accounted the meanest and worst of all forms of government." Bellingham was one of only two assistants (the other was Richard Saltonstall) who opposed the final decision that the assistants' veto should stand. Bellingham and Saltonstall were often in a minority that opposed the more conservative views of Winthrop and Thomas Dudley. In 1648 Bellingham sat on a committee established to demonstrate that the colony's legal codes were not "repugnant to the laws of England", as called for by the colonial charter.

In 1650, when Bellingham was an assistant, he concurred in the judicial decision banning William Pynchon's The Meritorious Price of Our Redemption, which expressed views many Puritans considered heretical. Bellingham was again elected governor in 1654, and again in May 1665 after the death of Governor John Endecott. He was thereafter annually re-elected to the post until his death, ultimately serving a total of ten years as governor and thirteen as deputy governor. While he was deputy to Endecott in 1656, a boat carrying several Quakers arrived in Boston. Since Endecott was in Salem at the time, Bellingham directed the government's reaction to their arrival. Because Quakerism was anathema to the Puritans, the Quakers were confined to the ship, their belongings were searched, and books promoting their religion were destroyed. After five weeks of captivity, they were sent back to England. During Endecott's administration the penalties for Quakers defying banishment from the colony were made progressively harsher, until they included the imposition of the death penalty for repeat offenders. Under these laws, four Quakers were put to death for returning to the colony after their banishment. Quaker historians have also been harsh in their assessments of Bellingham. After Massachusetts authorities agreed that the death penalty did not work (it had long term negative consequences, feeding perceptions of Massachusetts intransigence), the law was modified to reduce the penalties to branding and whipping.

== English Restoration ==
The 1640s and 1650s in England were a time of great turmoil. The English Civil War led to the establishment of the Commonwealth of England and eventually the Protectorate of Oliver Cromwell. In this period, Massachusetts was generally sympathetic to Cromwell and the Parliamentary cause. With the restoration of Charles II to the throne in 1660, all of the colonies, and Massachusetts in particular, came under his scrutiny. In 1661 he issued a mandamus forbidding further persecution of the Quakers. He also requested specific changes to be made to Massachusetts laws to increase suffrage and tolerance for other Protestant religious practices, actions that were resisted or ignored during the Endecott administration. Charles finally sent royal commissioners to New England in 1664 to enforce his demands, but Massachusetts, of all the New England colonies, was the most recalcitrant, refusing all of the substantive demands or enacting changes that only superficially addressed the issues.

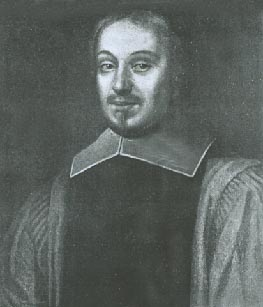
This portrait was once claimed to be of Bellingham; its sitter and artist are unknown.

The reaction by Charles to this was to issue an order in 1666 demanding that Bellingham, since he was then governor, and William Hathorne, the speaker of the general court, travel to England to answer for the colony's behavior. The issue of how to answer this demand divided the colony, with petitions from a cross-section of the colony's population calling for the magistrates to obey the king's demand. The debate also introduced a long-term rift in the council of assistants between hardliners wanting to resist the king's demands at all costs and moderates who thought the king's demands should be accommodated. Bellingham sided with the hardliners and the decision was reached to send the king a letter. The letter questioned whether the request actually originated with the king, protested that the colony was loyal to him, and claimed the magistrates had already explained fully why they were unable to comply with the king's demands. The magistrates further pacified the angered sovereign by sending over a ship full of masts as a gift (New England was a valuable source of timber for the Royal Navy). Distracted by the war with the Dutch and domestic politics, Charles did not pursue the issue further until after Bellingham's death, though for numerous reasons the Massachusetts Bay Colony charter was finally voided in 1684.

== Death and legacy ==
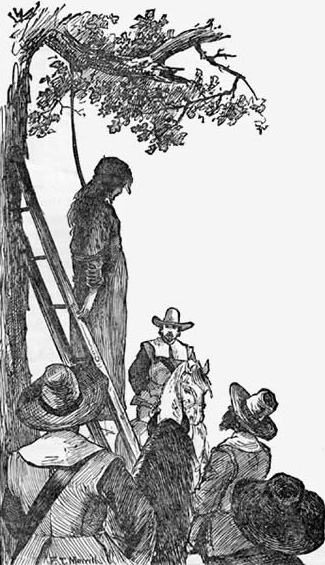
Depiction of the hanging of Ann Hibbins

Richard Bellingham died on 7 December 1672. He was the last surviving signer of the colonial charter, and was buried in Boston's Granary Burying Ground. He had a son, Samuel, from his first marriage and a second wife, Penelope, who outlived him by 30 years. His landholdings at Winnessimmett became tied up in legal action lasting more than 100 years, and involved court and procedural decisions on both sides of the Atlantic to resolve. Under the terms of his will, some of his properties in Winnessimmett were set aside for religious uses. His son challenged the will, which was eventually set aside. The litigation continued, carried on by his heirs and succeeding owners and occupants of the properties, and was finally concluded in 1785. The town of Bellingham, Massachusetts, is named in his honor, and a number of features in Chelsea, including a square, a street, and a hill, bear the name Bellingham.

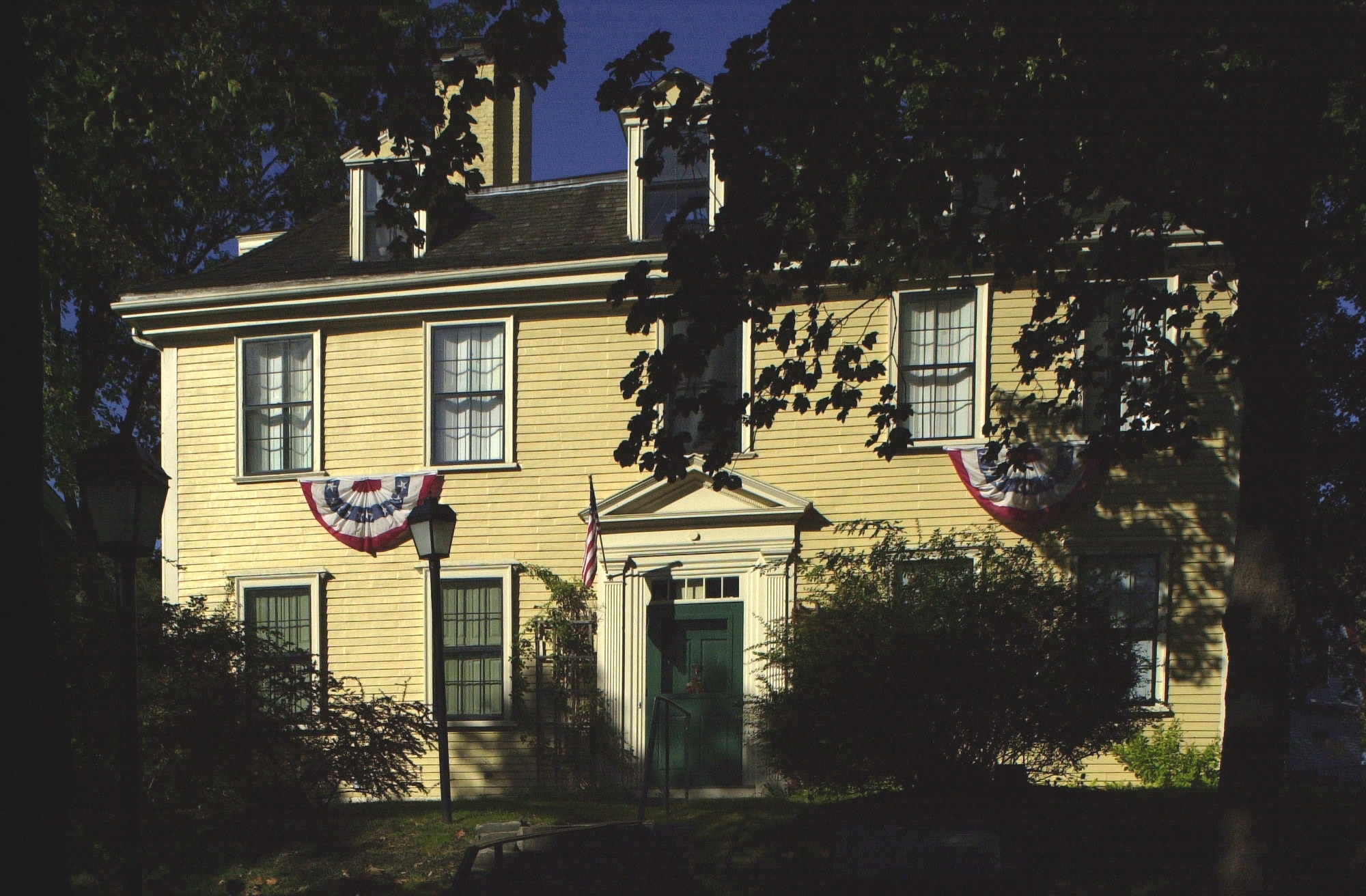
The Bellingham-Cary House at 34 Parker Street in Chelsea, Massachusetts is on the Richard Bellingham property and contains elements of his original house in the structure. It is now a museum owned by the Governor Bellingham-Cary House Association.

Bellingham was immortalized as a fictional character in Nathaniel Hawthorne's The Scarlet Letter, as the brother of Ann Hibbins, a woman who was executed (in real life in 1656, as well as in the book) for practicing witchcraft. There are apparently no contemporary references to Mrs. Hibbins as Bellingham's sister—Hawthorne's formation of this connection appears to be based on a footnote in James Savage's 1825 edition of John Winthrop's journals, and a genealogical tree of the Bellinghams published early in the 20th century does not mention her. However, Ann Hibbins' second husband, William Hibbins, was first married to Richard Bellingham's sister Hester but she died a year later and was buried in England. Bellingham also appears in Henry Wadsworth Longfellow's The New England Tragedies, which fictionalizes events dealing with the Quakers.

== Notes ==
Parliament of England
Preceded by Sir Edward Barkham; Richard Oakley	Member of Parliament for Boston; 1628–1629 with Richard Oakley (1628); Anthony Irby (1628–1629)	Vacant Parliament suspended until 1640 Title next held by Sir William Ellis; Sir Anthony Irby
Government offices
Preceded by Thomas Dudley	Governor of Massachusetts Bay Colony; 1641-1642	Succeeded by John Winthrop
Preceded by John Endecott	Governor of Massachusetts Bay Colony; 1654–1655	Succeeded by John Endecott
Preceded by John Endecott	Governor of Massachusetts Bay Colony; 1655-1672	Succeeded by John Leverett
