= 1878 Boston by-election =

UK Parliamentary by-election

The 1878 Boston by-election was fought on 12 August 1878. The by-election was fought due to the resignation in order to contest Argyllshire of the incumbent Conservative MP, John Malcolm. It was won by the Conservative candidate Thomas Garfit, who was unopposed.
