= All Saints' Church, Winthorpe =

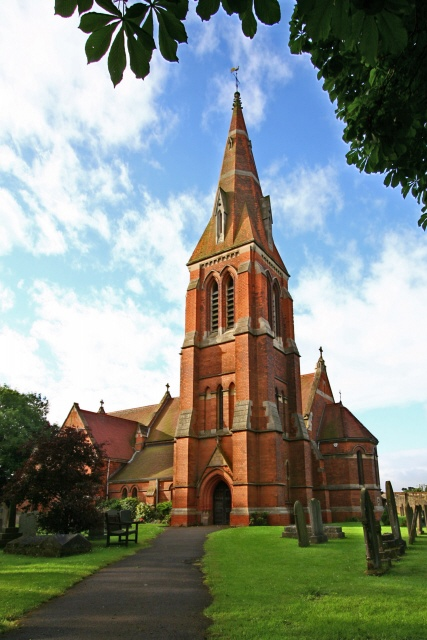
- All Saints' Church, Winthorpe
- All Saints' Church, Winthorpe
- 53°5′53.7642″N 0°47′19.1508″W
- OS grid reference: SK 81206 56360
- Location: Winthorpe, Nottinghamshire
- Country: England
- Denomination: Church of England

History
- Dedication: All Saints

Architecture
- Heritage designation: Grade II listed
- Architect: Sidney Gambier-Parry
- Architectural type: Gothic/Victorian
- Groundbreaking: 1886
- Completed: 1888

Administration
- Province: York
- Diocese: Diocese of Southwell and Nottingham
- Archdeaconry: Newark
- Deanery: Newark and Southwell
- Parish: Langford

All Saints' Church, Winthorpe is a Grade II listed parish church in the Church of England in Winthorpe, Nottinghamshire, England. The current building, the construction of which was completed in 1888, is at least the third version of the church, which dates back to at least the early 13th century. All Saints' Church was commissioned by the church rector, Edward Handley, in memory of one of his relatives.

== History ==
All Saints' Church, Winthorpe (pictured), a Church of England parish church in Winthorpe, Nottinghamshire, is within the Diocese of Southwell and Nottingham. It was built in 1886 to 1888 to replace the old Georgian structure, which had fallen into disrepair. The new building was commissioned by the then recently appointed rector, Edward Handley, a relative of William Handley, who had served as rector of the old church from 1836 to 1873. The new rector selected as architect Sidney Gambier-Parry, the son of philanthropist Thomas Gambier-Parry. The firm chosen to execute Gambier-Parry's Gothic design was Mackenzie & Sons of Newark-on-Trent, Nottinghamshire. The firm selected to produce the stained-glass windows was that of Clement Heaton, James Butler, and Robert T. Bayne, founded in 1952.

The site of the church, off Gainsborough Road, was that occupied by Parliamentary troops during their attacks on Newark-on-Trent at the time of the English Civil War of the mid 17th century. The original version of the church was severely damaged during that civil war. However, following the passage of the Act of Uniformity in 1559, decades earlier, a report made in August 1559 found that the chancel was already roofless. The oldest church dates back to at least the 13th century, although records are very limited prior to the late 17th century. The second version of All Saints' was built after the civil war. It underwent substantial repairs in 1779 when the tower fell and had to be rebuilt. As the second building was razed in 1886, excavation revealed the base for a cannon, gunpowder, and hundreds of skeletons. In addition, a vault within the walls of the old church contained the remains of Handley ancestors. In August 1886, construction of the new church commenced. Sir Henry Bromley, Baronet of Stoke Hall, East Stoke, Nottinghamshire, placed the foundation stone of the new church on All Saints' Day, 1 November 1886. Construction was completed in 1888 and, on 19 June 1888, All Saints' Church was consecrated by the Bishop of Lincoln. The consecration was postponed from 7 June 1888 as the Bishop of Southwell had taken ill.

The church was Grade II listed on 15 October 1984 by English Heritage. At the same time, the Thompson tomb in the churchyard and the gate piers of the entrance to the churchyard were also Grade II listed. In 1996, Anthony Keeble Shaw was appointed priest-in-charge of All Saints' Church, Winthorpe. He was also appointed priest-in-charge of St Bartholomew's, Langford and St Giles', Holme, and Diocesan Inspector of Church Schools for Southwell. In recent years, the rectory was sold and the parish has not had a priest residing in Winthorpe.

== Design ==
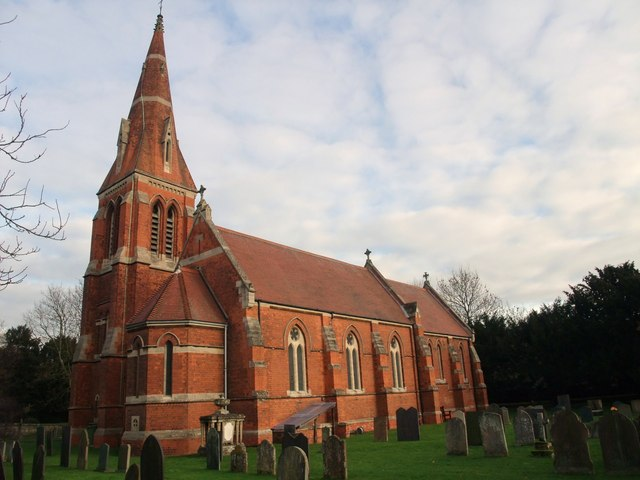
View of the southwestern aspect of All Saints' Church, Winthorpe

The new church was constructed primarily of red Walkeringham brick. Ancaster stone was utilised for exterior trim, with red Mansfield stone employed in the interior. The new tower, with brick spire, is at the northwest corner of the church. The lower portion of the tower features the entrance to the building, as well as a porch with a staircase that extends up to the belfry. There, two new bells were supplemented by three old bells from the former church. The number of bells was eventually increased to six. The arched entrance to the porch has ashlar trim, over which there is an ashlar cross. The ground floor of the tower has the entrance to the north, a pair of lancet windows to the east, and another pair to the west. Each side of the first floor of the tower features a grouping of three lancets, with a single lancet window flanked by blind lancets. The bell chamber, at the second floor of the tower, has four pairs of lancet windows. The spire has four lucarnes and a pinnacle trimmed with ashlar crockets. The church roof is tiled, the gable ends capped with stone.

An apsidal baptistry which projects from the west side of the nave has three lancet windows, over which is a band course. The south wall of the nave has three double lancet windows, each of which is surmounted by a cinquefoil and band course. The south wall of the chancel has three lancet windows with ashlar trim. The nave and chancel are in the same locations as those of the previous church. However, the baptistry is at the site of the previous west tower. The new church is substantially larger than the former. The current tower, vestry, north aisle, organ chamber, and most eastern portion of the chancel are all located on previously unoccupied ground, although the vestry was built over the Handley vault. The north aisle has five arched windows with ashlar trim. The double lancet of the organ chamber gable is surmounted by a quatrefoil. The illumination provided by stained-glass windows is supplemented by gas lighting. The most notable set of stained-glass windows in All Saints' is the grouping of three lancet windows above the altar, at the east end of the chancel. It was contributed by Mrs. Edward Gordon as a memorial to Cassandra Handley, the spouse of Charles Richard Handley. The set of windows depicts Christ surrounded by some of the saints.

In addition to the three old bells, there are several other vestiges of the former church. In the churchyard, they include an oval stone tablet and the pinnacle. The interior of the building contains a ceiling boss, door lock with key, royal arms, and some monuments from the previous church. Remnants of the original version of the church are limited to those incorporated into the wall of the churchyard.

== Memorials ==
The cost of construction of the church was borne by Edward Handley, in memory of his cousin Philip Handley. Memorial tablets to both men are located in the church nave. Other tablets dedicated to the memory of members of the Handley family line the walls of the vestry. Those members include: William Farnworth Handley, John Handley, his wife Martha Story Handley, his son John Handley, and Benjamin Handley. Tablets behind the organ honor Benjamin and Frances Handley, as well as four of their children, including their son Benjamin Handley who drowned as a young man in the Tagus in 1813. Memorials to Henry Handley (Edward's father) and Georgiana Handley (Edward's sister) are present in the chancel.

Other memorials in the organ chamber include those to William Rastell and his wife Mary, their son William Thomas Rastell, Annie Ranstall, Roger Pocklington and his wife Mary, their son Roger Pocklington and his wife Jane, and Christopher Morley and his wife Charlotte. Memorials to churchwarden Robert Hunt Bradley, physician Robert Taylor and his wife Elizabeth, and their son Robert Taylor are present in the nave. Other tributes are scattered throughout the church.

== East Trent Group of Churches ==
All Saints' Church, Winthorpe is part of a group of eleven parishes, the East Trent Group of Churches, which receives support from David Milner. He has been the priest-in-charge at All Saints' since 2006. The other parishes include:

- St Bartholomew's Church, Langford
- St Giles' Church, Holme
- St Cecilia's Church, Girton
- All Saints' Church, Harby
- St George the Martyr's Church, North & South Clifton
- All Saints' Church, Collingham
- St John the Baptist's Church, Collingham
- St Helena's Church, South Scarle
- Holy Trinity Church, Besthorpe
- St Helen's Church, Thorney

== See also ==
- Listed buildings in Winthorpe, Nottinghamshire
