= Wendon =

Wendon may refer to:

- Wendon (town), in Waikaia Ward, Southland District, New Zealand
- John Wendon, English MP
- Luke Wendon (born 1926), British fencer
- Nicholas Wendon, English clergyman Archdeacon of Suffolk 1559–1576; see List of Archdeacons of Suffolk

== See also ==
- Wenden (disambiguation)
- Michael Wenden (born 1949), Australian swimmer
