= Sir James Duke, 1st Baronet =

Lord Mayor of London and Liberal Member of Parliament

Sir James Duke Bt
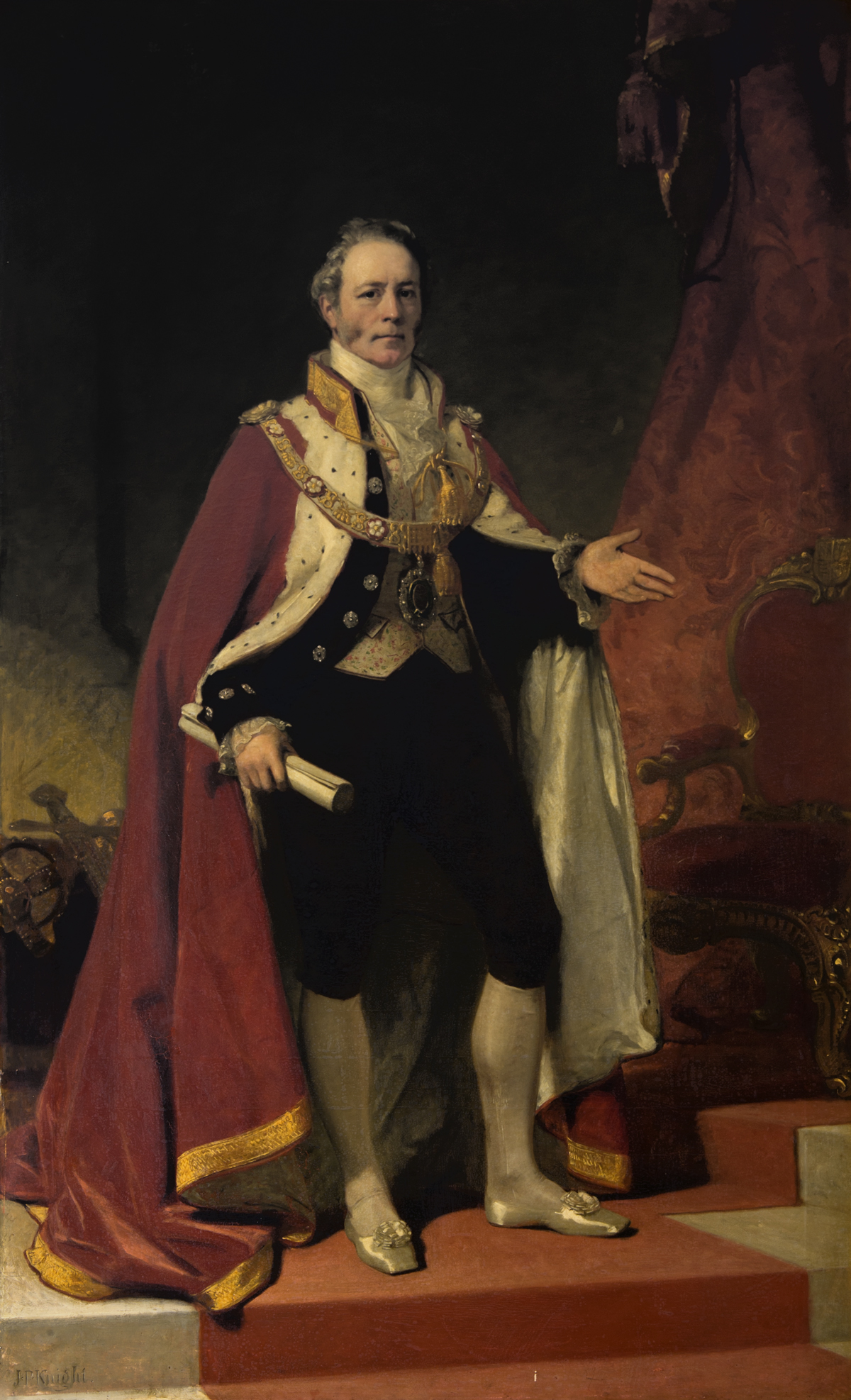
- Sir James Duke (1792–1873), 1st Baronet

Lord Mayor of London
- In office 1848–1849
- Preceded by: John Wilks
- Succeeded by: Thomas Farncomb
- Parliamentary group: Liberal Party
- Constituency: Boston

Member of Parliament for City of London
- In office 1849–1865
- Preceded by: James Pattison
- Succeeded by: William Lawrence

Member of Parliament for Boston
- In office 1837–1849

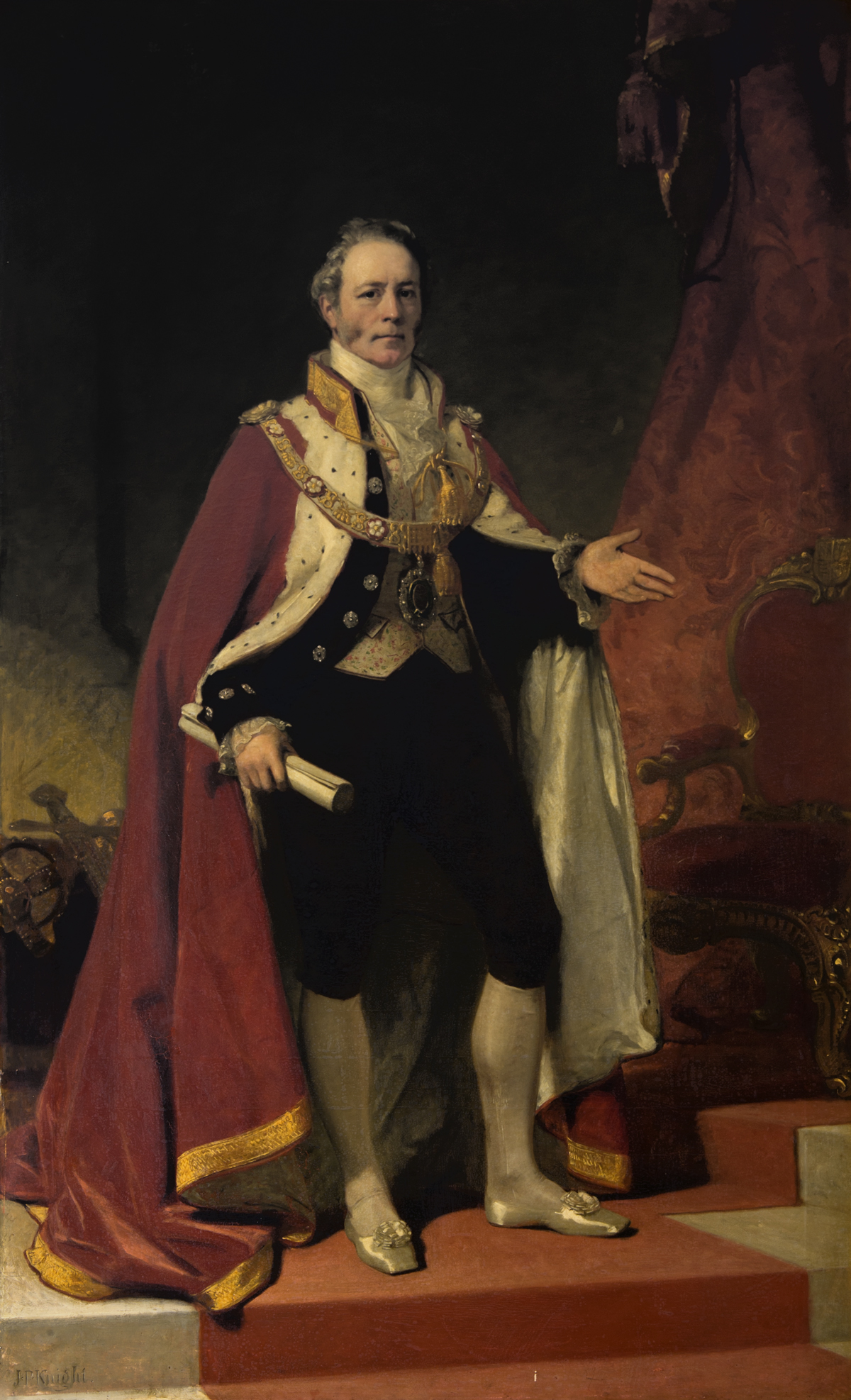
Sir James Duke (1792–1873), Bt

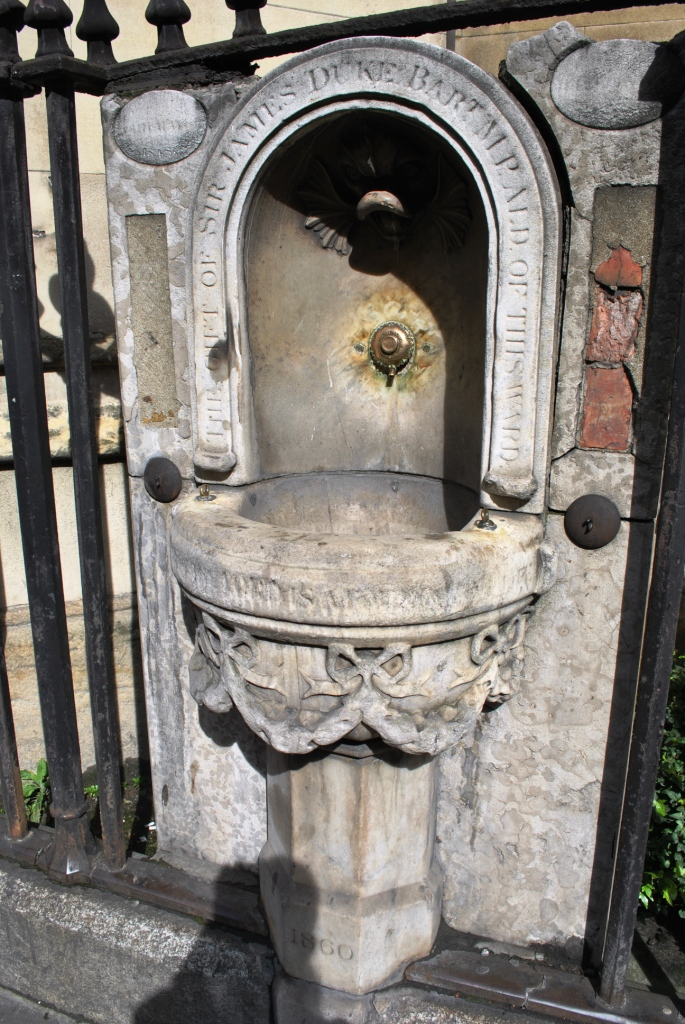
Drinking fountain given by Sir James Duke to the church of St Dunstan-in-the-West in the City of London

Sir James Duke, 1st Baronet (31 January 1792 – 28 May 1873) was a British Liberal Party politician. He was Lord Mayor of London in 1848–1849, and sat in the House of Commons from 1837 to 1865.

Born in Montrose, he was elected at the 1837 general election as a member of parliament (MP) for the borough of Boston in Lincolnshire, and was re-elected at the 1841 and 1847 general elections.

He was elected as Sheriff of the City of London in 1837 and knighted on 5 April of that year. Sir James was Lord Mayor of London in 1847. In June of that year a vacancy arose in the City of London constituency when the Liberal MP James Pattison died at age 62. A group of leading Liberals from the City met on 16 July and resolved to nominate Duke for the vacancy if he would consent, agreeing that:

"impressed with the opinion that the personal character and commercial experience of the Rt. Hon. Sir James Duke, combined with his business habits, and his long acquaintance with public affairs as a member of the House of Commons, eminently qualify him for the representation of the various interests of this city in Parliament"

A deputation was sent to the Mansion House, where Duke was asked to stand, which he immediately agreed to do.

He resigned his Boston seat by taking the Chiltern Hundreds, and at the by-election on 27 July 1849 he was elected as an MP for the City of London constituency, winning more than twice as many votes as his sole opponent, the Conservative Party candidate Lord John Manners.

He was made a baronet in October 1849, on 30 November he was appointed as a commissioner for enquiring into Smithfield Market. He held the City of London seat until he stood down from the Commons at the 1865 general election.

He was appointed High Sheriff of Sussex for 1872.

Parliament of the United Kingdom
Preceded by John Wilks; John Studholme Brownrigg	Member of Parliament for Boston; 1837–1849; With: John Studholme Brownrigg 1835–47; Benjamin Bond Cabbell 1847–57	Succeeded by Dudley Pelham; Benjamin Bond Cabbell
Preceded by James Pattison; Lord John Russell; John Masterman; Baron Lionel de Rothschild	Member of Parliament for City of London; 1849–1865; With: Baron Lionel de Rothschild 1847–68; Lord John Russell 1841–61; John Masterman 1841–57; Robert Wigram Crawford 1857–74; Western Wood 1861–63; George Goschen 1863–80	Succeeded by William Lawrence; George Goschen; Robert Wigram Crawford; Baron Lionel de Rothschild
Civic offices
Preceded by John Kinnersley Hooper	Lord Mayor of London; 1848–1849	Succeeded by Thomas Farncomb
Baronetage of the United Kingdom
New creation	Baronet (of London); 1849–73	Succeeded by James Duke
