= Naunton (disambiguation) =

Naunton is a village in Gloucestershire.

Naunton may also refer to:

- Naunton, Worcestershire, hamlet
- Chris Naunton
- Robert Naunton
- William Naunton
- Naunton Wayne
