= Thimbleby =

Thimbleby or Thymbleby may refer to:

- Thimbleby, Lincolnshire, England
- Thimbleby, North Yorkshire, England
- Thimbleby's Tower, Chester, Cheshire, England

- Thimbleby (surname)
