= George Faber =

George Faber may refer to:

- George Denison Faber, 1st Baron Wittenham (1852–1931), British peer
- George Stanley Faber (1773–1854), English theologist
- George Faber (TV producer), co-founder of British production company Company Pictures
- George Faber (British politician), British Member of Parliament for Boston, 1906–1910
