= Barkham (disambiguation) =

Barkham is a village in England.

Barkham may also refer to:

- Barkham baronets
- John Barkham (antiquary)
- Frederick Barkham (1905–1992), English cricketer
