= George Foster (MP) =

English Member of Parliament

George Foster or Forster (by 1518–1573), of Boston, Lincolnshire, was an English Member of Parliament.

He was a Member (MP) of the Parliament of England for Boston in March 1553, October 1553, April 1554, November 1554, 1555 and 1558. He was the Mayor of Boston, Lincolnshire 1558–9.
