= Meaburn Staniland =

British politician (1809–1898)

Meaburn Staniland (1809–1898) was a British Liberal Party politician.

== Life ==
He was the son of James Staniland, educated at Lincoln Grammar School. He was a solicitor at Boston, Lincolnshire, senior partner in the firm Staniland & Wigglesworth.

He was elected as a Member of Parliament (MP) for Boston at the 1859 general election, but was narrowly defeated at the 1865 general election. An election petition led in 1866 to the result being overturned: his opponent Thomas Parry was unseated, and the seat awarded to Staniland.

Staniland resigned from House of Commons on 8 March 1867 by becoming Steward of the Manor of Northstead.

== Family ==
Staniland married in 1840 Emma Stainbank, daughter of Robert William Stainbank of Skirbeck, and resided at Harrington Hall. They had five sons and three daughters. Of the children:

- James Meaburn Staniland (1841–1905), the eldest son, was a cleric.
- Robert Staniland, lawyer, town clerk of Boston and militia colonel. He was father of Meaburn and Geoffrey Staniland, both killed in World War I in 1915. Geoffrey was the father of Christopher Stainbank Staniland (1905–1942) the test pilot. The writer Meaburn Staniland (1914–1992) was the youngest son of Meaburn (died 1915).
- Meaburn Staniland F.G.S. (born 1853), third son.
- Charles Arthur Staniland (born 1856) was an army officer.
- Alfred Edward Staniland (born 1861), fifth son, a barrister. He married in 1903 Helen Katherine Overton, only child of John Henry Overton.
- Edith Meaburn, second daughter, married in 1877 Richard Worsley (1838–1899), army officer in India.

Parliament of the United Kingdom
Preceded by William Henry Adams; Herbert Ingram	Member of Parliament for Boston; 1859 – 1865; With: Herbert Ingram to 1860; John Malcolm from 1860	Succeeded by Thomas Parry; John Malcolm
Preceded by Thomas Parry; John Malcolm	Member of Parliament for Boston; 1866–1867; With: John Malcolm	Succeeded by Thomas Parry; John Malcolm
