= Dudley Pelham =

British naval commander and Whig politician

Captain The Honourable Dudley Pelham
- Born: 20 April 1812
- Died: 13 April 1851 (aged 38)
- Spouse: Madalena Sinclair (m. 1839)
- Military career
- Allegiance: United Kingdom
- Branch: Royal Navy
- Service years: 1825–1851
- Rank: Captain
- Commands: HMS Wasp
- Conflicts: Greek War of Independence; Battle of Navarino; Egyptian–Ottoman War; Battle of Acre

Member of Parliament for Boston
- In office 1849–1851 Serving with Benjamin Bond Cabbell

Captain Dudley Worsley Anderson-Pelham (20 April 1812 – 13 April 1851) was a Royal Navy officer and Whig politician.

== Background ==
Dudley Worsley Anderson-Pelham was a younger son of Charles Anderson-Pelham, 1st Earl of Yarborough, by his wife Henrietta Anne Maria Charlotte, daughter of John Simpson and Henrietta Worsley. Charles Anderson-Pelham, 2nd Earl of Yarborough, was his elder brother.

== Career ==
Anderson-Pelham was a captain in the Royal Navy. He was returned to parliament as one of two representatives for Boston at a by-election in 1849, a seat he held until his early death in April 1851, aged 38.

== Family ==
Anderson-Pelham married Madalina, second daughter of Admiral Sir John Gordon Sinclair of Murkle, 8th Baronet, and sister and co-heiress of Sir Robert Charles Sinclair of Murkle, 9th Baronet, in 1839.

== See also ==
- O'Byrne, William Richard (1849). "Pelham, Dudley Worsley Anderson" . A Naval Biographical Dictionary . John Murray – via Wikisource.

Parliament of the United Kingdom
Preceded by Sir James Duke, Bt; Benjamin Bond Cabbell	Member of Parliament for Boston; 1849–1851; With: Benjamin Bond Cabbell	Succeeded by Benjamin Bond Cabbell; James William Freshfield
