= Thomas Parry (Boston MP) =

British politician (1818–1879)

Thomas Parry (23 February 1818 − 23 December 1879) was a British Liberal Party politician from Sleaford in Lincolnshire. He sat in the House of Commons for three short periods between 1865 and 1874.

== Early life ==
Parry was born in 1818 (according to his tombstone, on 23 February), son of William Parry (1786–1876), of Lincoln, and his wife, Mary Stanley (1799–1868), daughter of Henry Stanley.

== Business ==
He became an articled clerk to Charles Kirk the elder (1791–1847), architect, of Sleaford, responsible for many new buildings in the town in the 1830s and 1840s. The men became partners, their firm being called Kirk and Parry. In 1841, Parry married Kirk's daughter, Henrietta Kirk. After Kirk's death, his son, Charles replaced him as partner in the business.

Parry was also a proprietor of the colliery in Strafford, near Barnsley, Yorkshire.

== Parliamentary career ==
He was elected at the 1865 general election as a member of parliament (MP) for the borough of Boston in Lincolnshire, but an election petition was lodged and the result was overturned on 21 March 1866 in favour of the other Liberal candidate Meaburn Staniland.

Staniland resigned from the Commons on 8 March 1867, and Parry was returned unopposed in his place at a by-election on 16 March. He did not stand at the 1868 general election, but was re-elected at the 1874 general election. That result was the subject of another election petition, which led to 353 of Parry's 1,347 votes being struck off, thereby making John Wingfield Malcolm the winner of the second seat. The bribery was so extensive that even more votes could have been struck off, but the process was stopped on 8 June 1874 when Malcolm had a nominal majority of two votes. A Royal Commission was established to enquire into the electoral process in the borough.

== Death ==
Parry died at Mustapha Superieur in Algiers on 23 December 1879 aged 61 and his remains were interred at Quarrington, Lincolnshire.

Parliament of the United Kingdom
Preceded by Meaburn Staniland; John Malcolm	Member of Parliament for Boston; 1865–1866; With: John Malcolm	Succeeded by Meaburn Staniland; John Malcolm
Preceded by Meaburn Staniland; John Malcolm	Member of Parliament for Boston; 1867 – 1868; With: John Malcolm	Succeeded by Thomas Collins; John Malcolm
Preceded by John Malcolm; Thomas Collins	Member of Parliament for Boston; Feb 1874 – June 1874; With: William Ingram	Succeeded by John Malcolm; William Ingram
