= Listed buildings in Winthorpe, Nottinghamshire =

Winthorpe is a civil parish in the Newark and Sherwood district of Nottinghamshire, England. The parish contains 16 listed buildings that are recorded in the National Heritage List for England. Of these, one is listed at Grade II*, the middle of the three grades, and the others are at Grade II, the lowest grade. The parish comprises the village of Winthorpe and the surrounding area. All the listed buildings are in the village, most of which are houses and associated structures. The other listed buildings consist of a village cross, a public house, a church, a tomb in the churchyard, and the gate piers at the entrance to the churchyard.

== Key ==
Grade	Criteria
II*	Particularly important buildings of more than special interest
II	Buildings of national importance and special interest

== Buildings ==
Name and location	Photograph	Date	Notes	Grade
Village Cross; 53.10185°N 0.78573°W		14th century	The village croos has a brick plinth, on which is a stone socket and a part of a shaft.	II
Lord Nelson Public House; 53.10086°N 0.78538°W		17th century	The public house is in whitewashed rendered brick with a pantile roof and two storeys. The main range has three bays, a central doorway and sash windows. To the left is a later projecting extension, and in the angle is a semicircular bay containing stairs. At the rear is a single-storey extension containing horizontally-sliding sash windows.	II
The Old Rectory Farmhouse; 53.10261°N 0.78577°W	—	Early 18th century	The house is in red brick, with a dentilled floor band, an eaves band and a pantile roof. There are two storeys and attics, three bays, and a two-storey single-bay rear extension. The central doorway has a fanlight and a segmental hood, it is flanked by splayed bay windows, and over it is an inscribed plaque. The upper floor contains five sash windows under segmental arches, and in the attic are three dormers with casement windows.	II
The Academy; 53.10133°N 0.78663°W	—	18th century	The house is in colourwashed brick with stone dressings, and it has a pantile roof with coped gables and kneelers. There are two storeys and ten bays, a single-storey extension to the south and later rear extensions. On the front is a two-storey splayed bay window with a parapet, and a single-storey bay window. The doorway and some of the windows have segmental heads and keystones, and some windows have hood moulds.	II
Winthorpe Hall; 53.10027°N 0.78850°W	—	c.1760	A country house in brick and stone, on a plinth, with a modillion cornice, and a hipped slate roof. There are two storeys above a rusticated basement, and five bays, the middle bay projecting slightly under a pediment. In the centre a double flight of steps leads up to a doorway in a moulded arch with pilasters, and a traceried fanlight. Above the doorway is a Venetian window, and the other windows are sashes. On two of the fronts are full-height canted bay windows.	II*
Dial House; 53.10143°N 0.78543°W		Late 18th century	The house is in red brick with a dogtooth eaves band and a hipped pantile roof. There are two storeys, and three bays, the middle bay projecting under an open pediment with a dogtooth cornice, and containing a stone sundial. In the ground floor of the middle bay are three segmental relieving arches with imposts and keystones, the central one with a doorway and the outer arches with windows. All the windows are casements.	II
Grange Cottage; 53.10041°N 0.78688°W		Late 18th century	A red brick house with a pantile roof, two storeys, three bays, and a later extension to the south. In the centre is a doorway with a plain surround and a fanlight, and the windows are sashes under segmental arches. In the extension is a metal casement window.	II
Pennywise House; 53.10057°N 0.78672°W	—	Late 18th century	The house is in red brick, with whitewashed stone dressings, and a slate roof with coped gables. There are two storeys and three bays, and a two-storey rear wing. The central doorway has fluted columns on pedestals, a rectangular traceried fanlight, an architrave and a flat hood. The windows are sashes with splayed lintels and keystones.	II
Winthorpe House; 53.10108°N 0.78440°W	—	Late 18th century	A small country house in red brick on a plinth, with stone dressings, a modillion cornice and a hipped slate roof. There are two storeys, three bays, and a basement under the north bay. The middle bay, which projects slightly, is bowed, under a modillion pediment. Five steps with railings lead up to a recessed doorway that has pilasters tapering up to fluted capitals, brackets with foliate decoration, and a modillion open pediment, under which is an arch on imposts. Flanking the middle bay are pilasters carrying a fluted stone arch with decorated voussoirs and a keystone. To the north is a two-storey canted bay window over which is a dormer, and the other windows are sashes.	II
Stable Block, Winthorpe House; 53.10092°N 0.78484°W	—	Late 18th century	The stable block is in red brick on a plinth, with stone dressings, a wooden modillion cornice, and a hipped slate roof. There is single storey and a loft, three bays and outer projecting wings. In the middle bay is a pair of doorways, each under a segmental arch with a keystone, above which is a modillion pediment. Between the doorways and flanking them are pilasters, the outer ones supporting an arch with a decorated keystone. The flanking bays each has a doorway with a traceried fanlight, and above is a dormer.	II
Lowwood; 53.09698°N 0.78770°W	—	1787	The house is in red brick, with a floor band, a modillion cornice and a hipped tile roof. There are two storeys, and a main range of four bays, the middle two bays projecting slightly, and a later rear wing with two storeys and two bays. In front of the middle two bays is a traceried wooden porch, the doorway has a plain surround, and above it is an inscribed plaque describing the laying of the first stone. The brickwork in the middle two bays is chequered, and all the windows are sashes with flat heads under segmental relieving arches.	II
The Grove; 53.09780°N 0.78769°W	—	c. 1800	A small country house in rendered brick, with floor bands, an eaves band, and a hipped slate roof. There are two storeys and three bays, and flanking single-bay single-storey outshuts with shaped stone parapets and finials. The bays are flanked by giant pilasters. In the basement is a central arch and a recessed doorway with a fanlight, flanked by single flights of a perron with iron railings. This leads to a doorway with fluted pilasters, a traceries fanlight, and an open modillion pediment. The windows are sashes, the window above the doorway has a segmental head, and is flanked by Diocletian windows. At the rear and sides are later extensions.	II
Thompson Tomb; 53.09826°N 0.78886°W		1809	The altar tomb in the churchyard of All Saints' Church is to the memory of Sarah Thompson. It is in stone and consists of a podium, with a central tomb surrounded by eight free-standing fluted shafts with decorated capitals. The shafts taper towards their bases, and carry a decorated entablature surmounted by an urn with acanthus decoration.	II
Conservatory, The Grove; 53.09782°N 0.78821°W	—	Late 19th century	The conservatory is in wood and glass, with a brick back wall. The front is canted, with three sides on a brick plinth, and it contains central double doors. The roof is in glass, and the glass panes on the sides are arched at the eaves.	II
All Saints' Church; 53.09829°N 0.78869°W		1886–88	The church is in red brick with stone dressings, and consists of a nave, a north aisle, a chancel, a north vestry and organ chamber, a northwest steeple, and a southwest apsidal baptistry. The steeple has a tower, which contains the porch, with a base and four stages, buttresses, lancet windows, two-light bell openings with hood moulds, and a broach spire with two tiers of lucarnes and a crocketed pinnacle. The porch has an arched entrance on the north side of the tower, a hood mould, and a gable with a cross.	II
Gate piers, All Saints' Church; 53.09864°N 0.78890°W		1886–88	Flanking the entrance to the churchyard is a pair of gate piers. They are in brick and stone, and have iron fitments and wooden gates.	II
