= Benjamin Bond Cabbell =

British politician and philanthropist

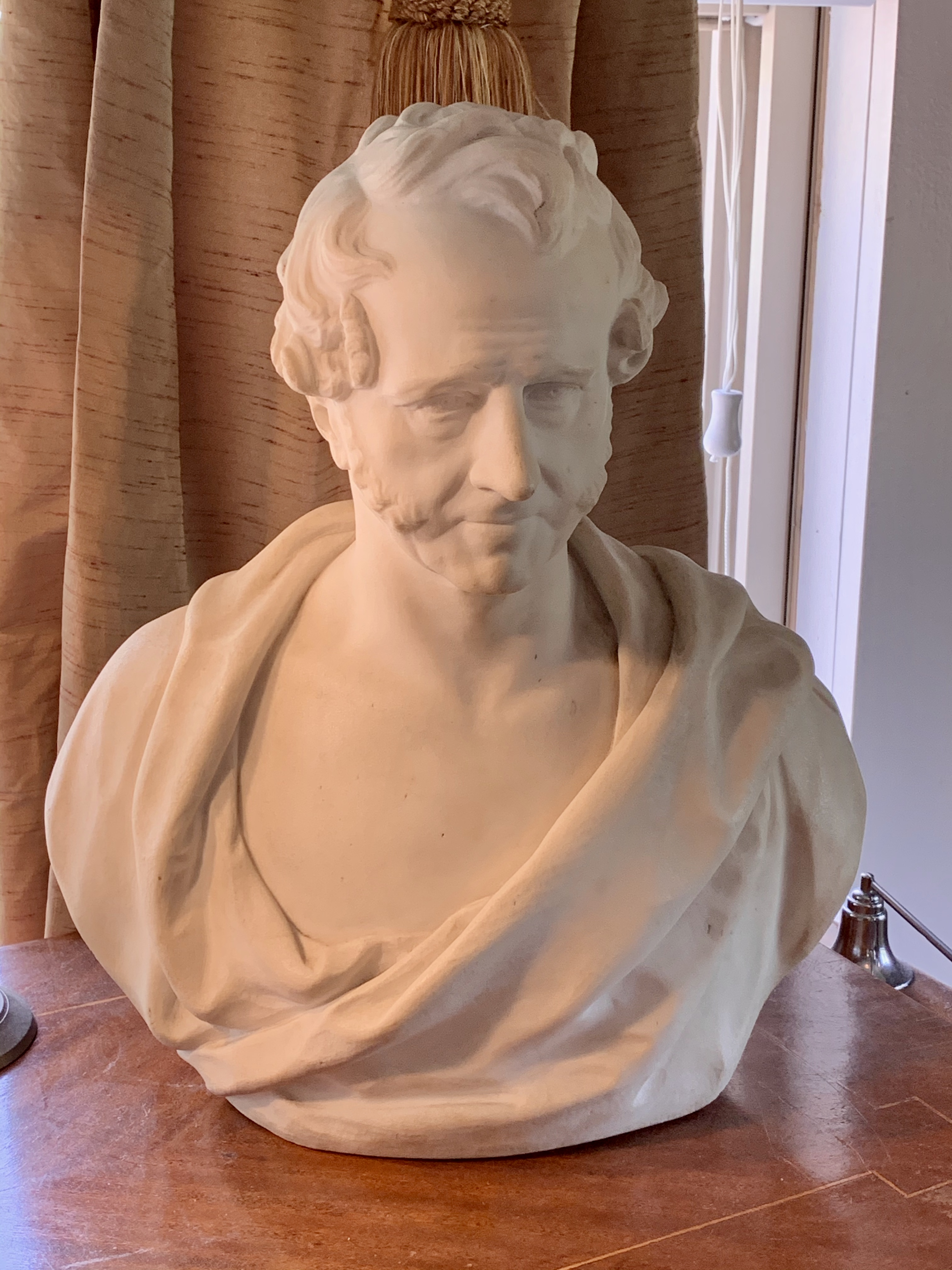
Benjamin Bond Cabbell by Morton Edwards, 1869

Benjamin Bond Cabbell FRS FSA FGS DL (1782/83 – 9 December 1874), was a British politician and philanthropist.

== Life ==
He was educated at Westminster School in London. He studied at Oriel College, Oxford from June 1800, but left the university in 1803 without a degree. Instead he trained as a lawyer through apprenticeship.

He was called to the bar of the Middle Temple in 1816 and practised on the western circuit. He was a magistrate for Norfolk, Middlesex, and Westminster. Cabbell was elected a fellow of the Royal Society on 19 January 1837.

Cabbell was Conservative Party Member of Parliament for St Albans from August 1846 to July 1847, and then for Boston until he retired in March 1857. He was Deputy Lieutenant of Middlesex in 1852, and High Sheriff of Norfolk in 1854.

He was president of the City of London General Pension Society, vice-president of the Royal Literary Fund, treasurer to the London Lock Hospital, and sub-treasurer to the Infant Orphan Asylum. He was a generous benefactor to Cromer in Norfolk where he had his country house, Cromer Hall: he paid for a lifeboat (named after him) and donated land for a cemetery. He was a freemason, serving as a trustee of the Royal Masonic Benevolent Institution and as provincial grand master of Norfolk.

Cabbell subscribed to many London charities. He was widely known as an art patron. He became a member of the Artists' Benevolent Fund in 1824, sat on its committee, helped in obtaining its charter of incorporation in 1827, and contributed 20 pounds towards the preliminary expenses.

He died at 39 Chapel Street, Marylebone Road, London, 9 December 1874, in his 92nd year.

Parliament of the United Kingdom
Preceded by The Earl of Listowel; George Repton	Member of Parliament for St Albans; 1846–1847; With: George Repton	Succeeded by George Repton; Alexander Raphael
Preceded by John Studholme Brownrigg; Sir James Duke, Bt	Member of Parliament for Boston; 1847–1857; With: Sir James Duke, Bt 1847–1849; Hon. Dudley Pelham 1849–1851; James William Freshfield 1851–1852; Gilbert Heathcote 1852–1856; Herbert Ingram 1856–1857	Succeeded by Herbert Ingram; William Henry Adams
Honorary titles
Preceded by Daniel Gurney	High Sheriff of Norfolk; 1854	Succeeded by Brampton Gurdon
