= Mayor of Boston, Lincolnshire =

The following were mayors of Boston, Lincolnshire:

- 1547-8: John Wendon
- George Foster: 1558-9.
- Sir Thomas Middlecott in 1610s
