= Francis Allen (1518/19-66/76) =

English Member of Parliament

Francis Allen (1518/19-66/76), of Westminster, Middlesex, was an English Member of Parliament. He was a Member (MP) of the Parliament of England for Boston in October 1553.
