= Thimbleby (surname) =

Thimbleby, with its variant Thymbleby, is an English surname. Notable people with this surname include the following:

- Harold Thimbleby (born 1955), English computer scientist
- Neil Thimbleby (born 1939), New Zealand rugby union player
- Stephen Thymbleby (died 1587), English politician
