= Handley family =

The Handleys were a prominent family in Sleaford, Lincolnshire, between around 1777 and the late 1800s. An offshoot of the notable Newark family, the Handleys of Sleaford came to hold position as lawyers, bankers, politicians and clerics in the town and attained great wealth and holdings in the area. The family maintained an interest in transportation - first in canalisation and later the development of the railways.

The first family member to inhabit Sleaford was Benjamin Handley, who moved to the town some time in the 1770s. He helped develop the fledgling Sleaford Navigation and founded a bank in the town. The most well known member of the family is the politician Henry Handley, who was a Member of Parliament for the Southern Division of Lincolnshire between 1832 and 1841. He also helped pioneer the development of railways in the area.

In the latter part of the 1800s elements of the family emigrated to New Zealand (and later Australia) as well as returning to Newark. Buildings and monuments related to the Handleys still exist in modern day Sleaford — including Handley street, Benjamin Handley's manor house on Northgate, Lloyd's Bank (Alvey House) and the Handley Monument.

== Early Handleys ==
The Handleys distant forefathers appear, according to a 1614 pedigree of the family, to be the "Ancient Family Handley of Handley in the County of Somerset" with later ascendant's noted in York and other parts of Yorkshire. The family's first direct ancestors appear in baptism records for the area of Bramcote and Wilford (now part of modern day Nottingham) dating between 1590 and 1594. Later Handleys moved to Balderton and Newark, where the first member of the family to inhabit Sleaford, Benjamin, was born in 1754, to Willam and Sarah Handley.

== Benjamin Handley, 1754 ==
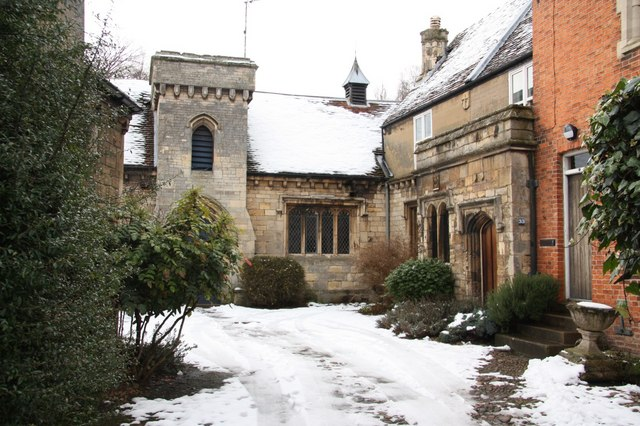
Benjamin Handley's Manor house, Northgate Sleaford (2009)

Benjamin Handley (17 October 1754 – 25 April 1828) was the youngest son of William Handley. He moved to Sleaford some time before April 1777, when he appears in records as an attorney in the town. In 1781 Benjamin was the clerk of a committee set up to work on the conception of the Sleaford Navigation, in 1824 he became treasurer of the project and later advanced an interest free loan of £1,000.

Benjamin appears to have been involved chiefly in conveyancing property in the area until he co-founded the Bank of Peacock, Handley and Kirton, which opened on 2 April 1792 in Sleaford market place. The enterprise was closely related to the Sleaford Navigation project and its finances (Peacock was the Navigation Company's chairman). In 1803 the bank moved to Alvey House on Northgate. Some years after Handley's death it merged with Lloyds Bank but it still occupies the same building today.

Handley owned extensive areas of land in and around the town, including the manor at Burton Pedwardine and land in Heckington, Scredington and Spanby. In 1794, acting as commissioner of the Sleaford Enclosure Act, he received 25 acres in the town – with the land he built a manor house on Northgate.

Benjamin Handley married Frances Conington on 31 January 1785. The couple had seven children only four of whom (Frances, Benjamin, Elizabeth and Henry) survived beyond childhood. Frances was unimpressed with Sleaford at the time of her marriage; in a letter the same year she referred to it as "a very badly built town, chiefly belonging to one person and not likely to amend".

=== Benjamin Handley, 1791 ===
The eldest surviving son of Benjamin and Frances, Benjamin Handley (27 October 1791 – 22 May 1813) was a Lieutenant in the 9th Regiment of the Light Dragoons. He drowned in 1813 during the Peninsular War (1808–1814) when his boat capsized crossing the Tagus river. His cousin from the Newark arm of the family (also called Benjamin) was in the same boat, but survived.

== Henry Handley, 1797 ==
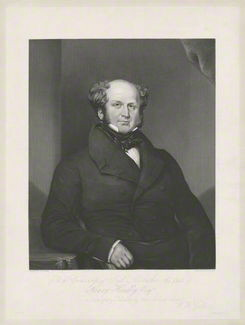
Portrait of Henry Handley by William Beetham (painted some time between 1834 and 1844)

Probably the best known Handley, Henry (c. 1797 – 29 June 1844) was the youngest son of Benjamin and Francis. Educated at Eton and Oxford he was elected Member of Parliament for a borough in Wiltshire. In 1825 he married Caroline Edwards, with whom he had 10 children.

At this time the family lived in Culverthorpe Hall, 5 miles from Sleaford, which Henry was renting. The year after his marriage Handley left parliament and became a gentleman farmer at Culverthorpe. In 1832, at the request of local freeholders, he was elected again to parliament, this time representing South Lincolnshire (along with Gilbert Heathcote) and a member of the Whig party. Handley received local praise for his parliamentary action and was again elected in 1835 and 1837.

During the early 1830s Handley was a proponent of steam power; both in relation to agriculture and the railways. In 1829 he had offered a prize to anyone able to create a successful steam plough. (Note: Nottingham & Newark Mercury, 16 January 1830, p.5, col.3: "We understand that Henry Handley Esq has received a model of a steam plough for which he has lately offered a handsome premium") In 1835 he helped revive Nicholas Cundy's proposal for a "Grand Northern Railway", running between London and York. As well as forming a company for the project, Northern and Eastern, Handley obtained the services of engineer James Walker to survey the proposed route. In 1836 various proposals for such lines were considered by parliament; the Northern and Eastern line was approved, but only as far as Cambridge (George Stephenson had convinced parliament that a Northern line via Derby was sufficient).

Handley's support of the Liberal government in an 1840 vote of no confidence caused a falling out with his party and he decided not to stand in the 1841 general election. Nevertheless his candidacy was proposed and seconded, although he was not re-elected. A year after leaving parliament for the second time Handley became president of the recently formed Royal Agricultural Society; he had been one of 12 trustees during the society's formation in 1838/39.

Handley died on 29 June 1846 at Surrenden-Dering, Kent, he is buried at Pluckley. The following year Sleaford townspeople began raising a subscription to construct a memorial in the town, eventually obtaining £942. Construction on the "Handley Testimonial in Sleaford" (now known as "Handley's monument"), designed by William Boyle, began in 1850 and was completed in 1852. A street was later named after him.

=== Rev. Edward Handley, 1842 ===
Edward Handley (21 October 1842 – 1 February 1904) was the youngest son of Henry and Caroline and an ordained minister of the Church of England. He became Rector of Winthorpe in 1886, whereupon he commissioned a new church building. This marked a return to Newark for the Sleaford branch of the family.

== Henry Edwardes Handley, 1835 ==
Henry Edwardes Handley (24 September 1835 – 24 June 1892) was a soldier and Crimean War veteran. The eldest son of Henry and Caroline he was educated at Eton and in 1853 joined the 2nd Dragoons as a cornet. During the famous Charge of the Light Brigade in 1854 he commanded the right hand troop of his regiment.

== Family tree ==
Family tree

William Handley	Sarah Handley
Benjamin Handley; 1754–1828)	Frances Conington
Frances Handley (1787-)	Ann Handley (1788–1793)	Benjamin Handley (1791–1813)	Elizabeth Handley (1793-)	Jane Sarah Handley (1795–1795)	Henry Handley (1797–1844)	Caroline Edwards (1799-)
Caroline Handley (1826-)	Elizabeth Handley (1828-)	Frances Handley (1830-)	Jane Handley (1831-)	Lucy Handley (1833-)	Henry Handley (1835-1892)	Laura Handley (1837-)	Georgina Handley (1839-)	Emma Handley (1840-)	Edward Handley (1842-1904)
