= Anthony Irby (died 1682) =

English politician

Sir Anthony Irby (c. 1605 – 2 January 1682) was an English politician who sat in the House of Commons at various times between 1628 and 1682.

Irby was the eldest son of Sir Anthony Irby and his wife Elizabeth Peyton, third daughter of Sir John Peyton, 1st Baronet, and was born before 17 January 1605. He was admitted as a fellow-commoner at Emmanuel College, Cambridge in 1620. He was knighted on 2 June 1624. In 1628, Irby was elected Member of Parliament for Boston and sat until 1629 when King Charles decided to rule without parliament for eleven years. He was High Sheriff of Lincolnshire in 1637.

In April 1640, Irby was elected MP for Boston again in the Short Parliament. He was re-elected MP for Boston for the Long Parliament in November 1640. He sat until 1648 when he was excluded under Pride's Purge.

Irby was re-elected MP for Boston in 1656 for the Second Protectorate Parliament and elected for the seat again in 1659 for the Third Protectorate Parliament. In April 1660 he was re-elected MP for Boston for the Convention Parliament and was elected again in 1661 for the Cavalier Parliament. He was elected again in the second election of 1679 for the Second Exclusion Parliament and in 1681.

Irby married firstly, in 1623, Frances Wray, daughter of Sir William Wray, 1st Baronet, and had by her an only daughter, Elizabeth, who married Hon. George Montagu. He married secondly Margaret Smyth, daughter of Sir Richard Smythe, 2nd Baronet and after her death in 1631, next Margaret Barkham, daughter of Sir Edward Barkham, 1st Baronet, who died in 1640. By his second and third wife, Irby had no surviving children, three daughters having died as infants. On 19 August 1641, he married finally Catharine Paget, third daughter of William Paget, 4th Baron Paget, and had by her a son and five daughters.

Parliament of England
Vacant Parliament suspended since 1629	Member of Parliament for Boston; 1640–1648; With: William Ellis	Succeeded by William Ellis; Vacant
Preceded by William Ellis	Member of Parliament for Boston; 2-seat constituency from 1659; 1656–1659; With: Francis Mussenden Jan–May 1659	Succeeded by William Ellis; Vacant
Preceded by William Ellis; Vacant	Member of Parliament for Boston; 1660–1682; With: William Ellis Feb–Apr 1660; Thomas Hatcher 1660–1661; Lord Willoughby de Eresby 1661–1666; Sir Philip Harcourt 1666–1679; Sir William Ellis Feb–May 1679; Sir William Yorke 1679–1682	Succeeded by Lord Willoughby de Eresby; Peregrine Bertie
