= Bellingham–Cary House =

Historic house in Massachusetts, United States

- U.S. National Register of Historic Places
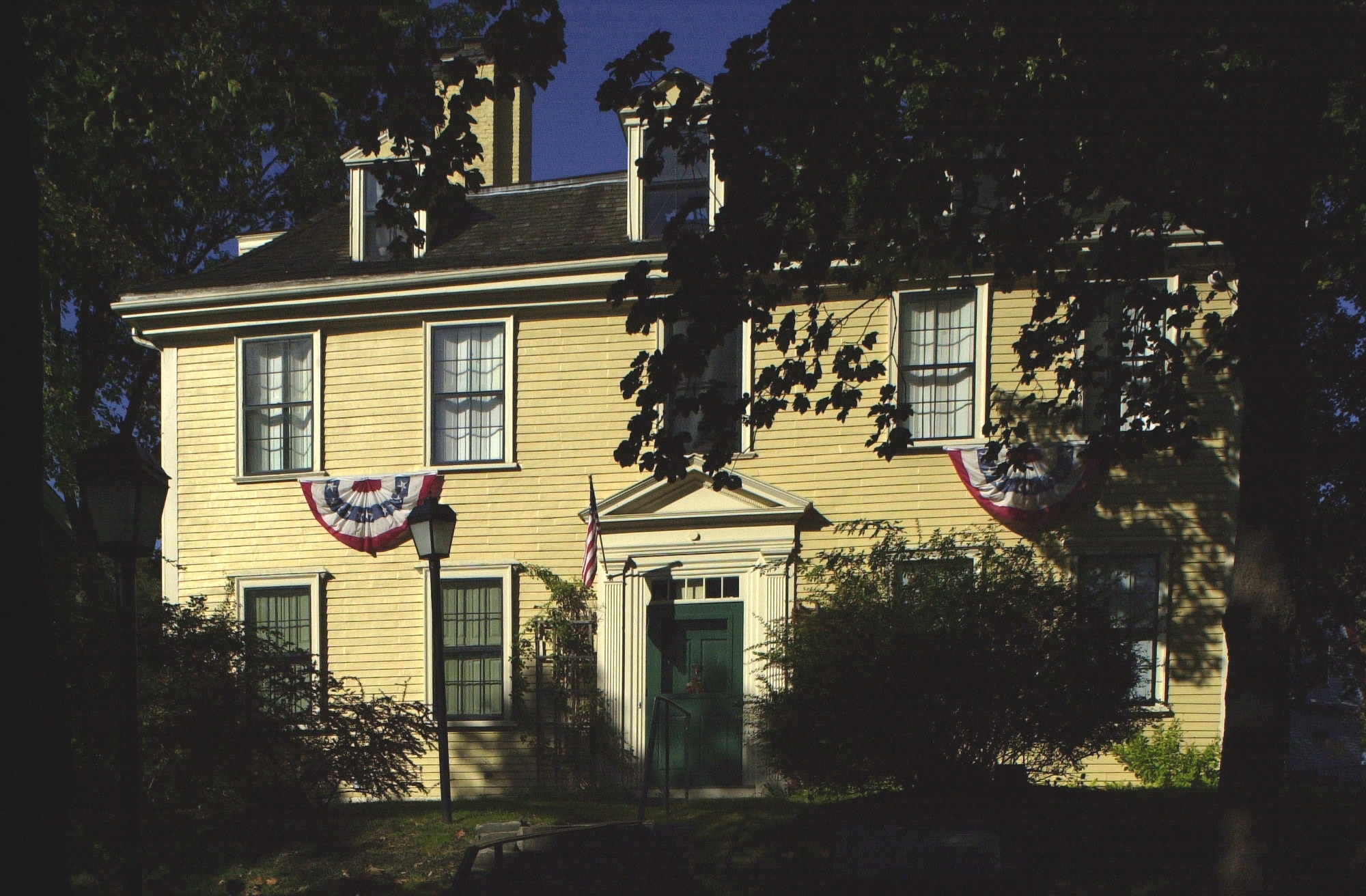

- Location within Massachusetts Location within the United States
- Location: 34 Parker St., Chelsea, Massachusetts
- Coordinates: 42°23′54″N 71°1′41″W
- Area: 1.2 acres (0.49 ha)
- Built: 1724
- Architectural style: Federal
- NRHP reference No.: 74000908
- Added to NRHP: September 06, 1974

The Bellingham–Cary House is a historic house museum at 34 Parker Street in Chelsea, Massachusetts. The house, built in 1724, may incorporate in its structure the 1659 hunting lodge of colonial governor Richard Bellingham and is the only surviving 18th-century building in the city. It was listed on the National Register of Historic Places in 1974.

== Description and history ==
The Bellingham–Cary House stands in a residential area of northeastern Chelsea, on the east side of Parker Street between Tudor Street and Clark Avenue. It is a two-story wood-frame structure, with a truncated hip roof, two interior chimneys, and a clapboarded exterior. Its main facade is five bays wide, with a center entrance flanked by Doric pilasters and topped by a transom window, entablature, and gabled pediment. The roof is pierced by three pedimented gable dormers on the front, and one on each of the sides. A two-story hip-roofed ell extends to the rear.

Richard Bellingham was an Englishman who was involved in the formation of the Massachusetts Bay Company, which formally established the Massachusetts Bay Colony and founded Boston in 1630. Bellingham came to Boston in 1634 and served three terms as governor of the colony before his death in 1672. Not long after his arrival, he purchased most of what is now Chelsea, as well as a ferry service between it and Boston. In 1659 he built a hunting lodge, which became his summer home. After his death, the quarter of his land that included the house eventually passed to the Cary family in 1741. They enlarged the house several times, and about 1791 Samuel Cary greatly expanded the house to create its present appearance.

After the deaths of Samuel Cary and his wife, most of the farm was sold off for development. The house remained in the family until 1914, when a local non-profit organization was established to preserve it. It has been owned since then by the Governor Bellingham–Cary House Association.

It won the 2006 Massachusetts Historical Commission Preservation Award. In 2008 the earliest part of the house was dated to 1724 using dendrochronology.

== Gallery ==
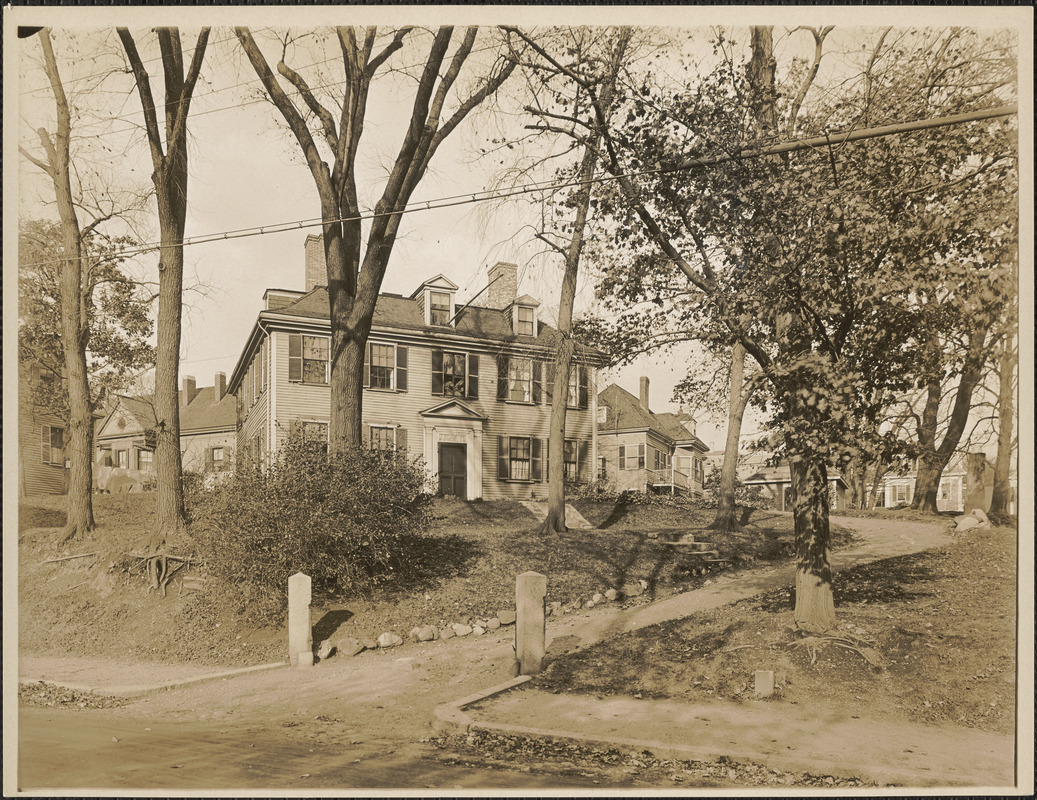
Bellingham–Cary House, 34 Parker Street, Chelsea, Mass.,[October 28, 1920]. Leon Abdalian Collection, Boston Public Library

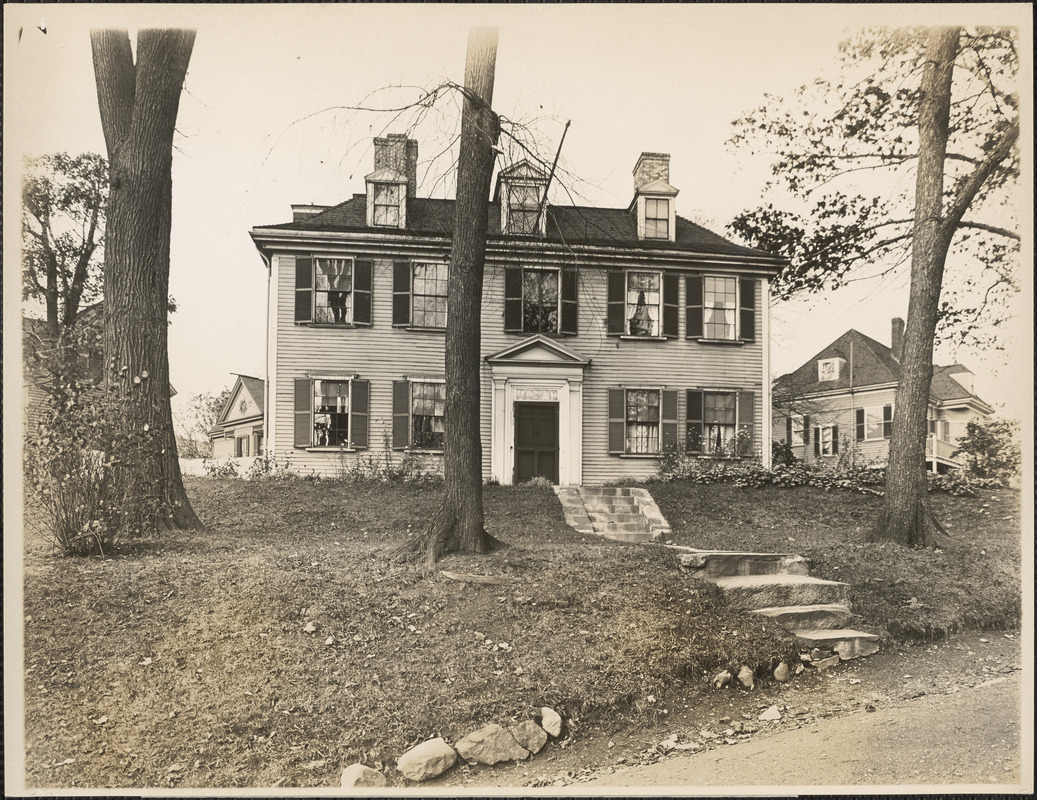
Bellingham–Cary House, 34 Parker Street, Chelsea, Mass., 28 October 1920. Leon Abdalian Collection, Boston Public Library

== See also ==
- List of the oldest buildings in Massachusetts
- National Register of Historic Places listings in Suffolk County, Massachusetts
