= Robert Carr (MP for Boston) =

English Member of Parliament

Member of Parliament for Boston
- In office 1559–1559
- Constituency: Boston

Personal details
- Born: c. 1511
- Died: 1590
- Occupation: Politician
- Known for: Member of Parliament for Boston (1559)

Robert Carr (c. 1511 – 1590), of Sleaford, Lincolnshire, was an English Member of Parliament. He was a Member (MP) of the Parliament of England for Boston in 1559.
