= Thomas Ellis (1569–1627) =

English politician (1569–1627)

Sir Thomas Ellis (1569–1627) was a lawyer and the member of Parliament for Great Grimsby in 1597.

He was the eldest son of Thomas Ellis of Wyham by Jane (d. 1605), daughter of John Hutchinson of Owthorpe, Nottinghamshire. He matriculated at Christ's College, Cambridge in November 1586 and entered Gray's Inn in May 1589. He was called to the bar and subsequently pursued his career in the North of England rather than London. It is assumed that his father's local influence that secured him his election to sit for Grimsby in 1597.

He succeeded his father in 1605, by which time he was married to Jane (d.1661), daughter of Gabriel Armstrong of Wysall, Nottinghamshire. He settled in Grantham rather than at Wyham. He served as a member of the Council of the North from July 1616 until his death. In April 1617 he was knighted at York.

He wrote his will in 1625 and was buried at Grantham in September 1627.

== Children ==
Ellis and Jane had 9 sons and 5 daughters, including:

- Thomas (c1605-40) married Elizabeth Harding of Northill, Bedfordshire.
- William (1609–80)
- Henry (1613–52) of Grantham
- Margaret married William Adams of Owston, South Yorkshire
- Elizabeth married Peter Ashton of Grantham
- Dorothy married William Ashurst of Ashurst in Skelmersdale, Lancashire
- Jane married John Lockey of Ridge, Hertfordshire
