= Stephen Thymbleby =

English politician

Stephen Thymbleby (died 1587), of St. Swithin's, Lincoln, was an English politician.

He was a member (MP) of the parliament of England for Boston in 1572 and Lincoln in 1584.
