= John Wendon =

English Member of Parliament

John Wendon (by 1514–54), of Boston, Lincolnshire, was an English Member of Parliament. He was a Member (MP) of the Parliament of England for Boston in 1547.He was Mayor of Boston, Lincolnshire 1548-9.
