= Vincent Skinner =

English politician

Sir Vincent Skinner (1543 – 28 February 1616) was an English politician, who sat in Parliament for numerous constituencies.

He was born the son of John Skinner, a mercer of Thorpe-by-Wainfleet, Lincolnshire. He matriculated at Trinity College, Cambridge in 1557, graduated B.A. in 1561 and M.A. in 1564 and entered Lincoln's Inn in 1565.

He held a number of public offices, including Constable of Bolingbroke Castle and Lincoln Castle in 1583. He was secretary to William Cecil, 1st Baron Burghley from c. 1575 to 1593, after which was appointed to the Exchequer as an auditor of the receipt.

He was a Member of Parliament for Truro in 1571. Subsequently, he sat for Barnstaple in 1572, Boston three times from 1584; for Boroughbridge in 1592; for St Ives in 1597 and for Preston in 1604. He was knighted in 1603 and received the manor of Thornton, including Thornton Abbey, in Lincolnshire in consideration of his service to Sir Oliver Cromwell. He commissioned the architect John Thorpe to build a stately home on the foundations of the ruined abbey, which collapsed shortly after its completion.

Skinner compiled a schedule of the Crown Jewels of England in 1606.

On his death he was buried at St Andrew's, Holborn, London. He had married twice, firstly Audrey, the daughter of Richard Ogle of Pinchbeck, Lincolnshire and the widow of John Man of Bolingbroke, Lincolnshire (and a cousin of Lord Burghley's wife) and secondly Elizabeth the daughter of Robert Fowkes of Symondsbury, Dorset and the widow of Henry Middlemore of Enfield, Middlesex, with whom he had a son.
