= Leonard Irby =

English Member of Parliament

Leonard Irby (by 1522–1571), of Sutterton and Boston, Lincolnshire and London, was an English Member of Parliament.

He was a Member (MP) of the Parliament of England for Stamford in 1545 and for Boston in March 1553, April 1554, November 1554, 1555, 1558, 1559, 1563 and 1571.
