= Barkham baronets =

Extinct baronetcy in the Baronetage of England

There have been two baronetcies created for members of the Barkham family, both in the Baronetage of England. Both creations are extinct.

The Barkham Baronetcy, of South Acre in the County of Norfolk, was created in the Baronetage of England on 26 June 1623 for Edward Barkham, later Member of Parliament for Boston. He was the son of Sir Edward Barkham (d. 1634), Lord Mayor of London from 1621 to 1622. Barkham was succeeded by his elder son Edward, the second Baronet. He was Sheriff of Norfolk between 1667 and 1668. He died without male issue and was succeeded by his younger brother, William, the third Baronet. He had no surviving male issue and on his death in 1695 the baronetcy became extinct.

The Barkham Baronetcy, of Wainflete in the County of Lincoln, was created in the Baronetage of England on 21 July 1661 for Edward Barkham. He was the son of Sir Robert Barkham, younger brother of the first Baronet of South Acre. The title became extinct on the death of Barkham's grandson, the third Baronet, in 1711.

Escutcheon of the Barkham baronets

== Barkham baronets, of South Acre (1623) ==
- Sir Edward Barkham, 1st Baronet (c. 1595 – 2 August 1667)
- Sir Edward Barkham, 2nd Baronet (1628–1688)
- Sir William Barkham, 3rd Baronet (28 February 1639 – 28 December 1695)

== Barkham baronets, of Wainflete (1661) ==
- Sir Edward Barkham, 1st Baronet (20 March 1631 – 14 September 1669). Barkham was the son of Sir Robert Barkham, younger son of Sir Edward Barkham, Lord Mayor of London between 1621 and 1622. His mother was Mary, daughter of Richard Wilcox. In 1661 he was created a Baronet, of Wainflete in the County of Lincoln. Between 1664 and 1665 he served as Sheriff of Lincolnshire. Barkham married Anne, daughter of Sir Robert Lee, in 1656. He died in September 1669, aged 38, and was succeeded in the baronetcy by his son, Robert.
- Sir Robert Barkham, 2nd Baronet (died c. 1701)
- Sir Edward Barkham, 3rd Baronet (c. 1680–13 September 1711)
