= William Garfit =

British politician

Garfit in 1895.

William Garfit (9 November 1840 – 29 October 1920) was an English banker and Conservative Party politician from the town of Boston in Lincolnshire. He held several local offices in Lincolnshire, and sat in the House of Commons from 1895 to 1906.

== Early life ==
He was the eldest son of William Garfit from Boston and his wife Jane, the daughter of J. Hassard Short of Horncastle. He was educated at Harrow and at Trinity College, Cambridge, where he graduated with a B.A. degree in 1862.

== Career ==
Garfit became a banker, rising to the post of director of the Capital and Counties Bank by 1895, vice-chairman in 1899 and chairman by 1916.

He was appointed as a Deputy Lieutenant of Lincolnshire in 1891, was High Sheriff of Lincolnshire in 1892, and was also a Justice of the Peace (J.P) in Lincolnshire. He served as a captain in the 2nd Lincoln Rifle Volunteers from 1874 to 1881.

He was elected as a Member of Parliament (MP) for the borough of Boston at the 1895 general election, defeating the sitting Liberal Party MP Sir William James Ingram, Bt. He was re-elected in 1900, but was defeated at the 1906 general election by the Liberal George Henry Faber.

In July 1911 he was appointed as a member of the new advisory committee on the selection of Justices in the Parts of Holland.

== Personal life ==
In 1868 Garfit married Mary Krause, the daughter of Connolly Norman from Derry.

They lived at Chesham Place in London, and West Skirbeck House in Boston, Lincolnshire, England.

Parliament of the United Kingdom
Preceded by Sir William Ingram, Bt	Member of Parliament for Boston; 1895 – 1906	Succeeded by George Faber
