= George Faber (British politician) =

British Liberal MP (1839-1910)

Member of Parliament for Boston
- In office 1906 – January 1910

Personal details
- Born: 10 December 1839
- Died: 6 April 1910 (aged 70)
- Party: Liberal

George Henry Faber (10 December 1839 – 6 April 1910) was a British insurance underwriter and a Liberal Party politician.

Faber was born in Camberwell, and became a member of Willis & Faber Company of Cornhill, underwriters specialising in marine insurance. He was on the committee of Lloyd's of London, and The Times newspaper reported in 1906 that he might have been chairman of Lloyd's if he had wanted the post.

He was elected at the 1906 general election as the Member of Parliament for the borough of Boston in Lincolnshire, but did not stand again at the January 1910 election. He died in April 1910, aged 70.

Parliament of the United Kingdom
Preceded by William Garfit	Member of Parliament for Boston; 1906 – January 1910	Succeeded by Charles Harvey Dixon
