= Francis Bullingham =

English politician

Francis Bullingham (1554 – ca. 1636), of the Cathedral Close, Lincoln was an English politician.

Bullingham was the son of Nicholas Bullingham, Bishop of Lincoln then Worcester. He matriculated at Jesus College, Cambridge in 1568, but transferred to King's College, Cambridge, where he studied 1569–1572, and was admitted to Gray's Inn in 1576.

He was a member (MP) of the parliament of England for Lincoln in 1601 and Boston in 1604.
