= Frederick Barkham =

English cricketer and cricket coach

Personal information
- Full name: Frederick Barkham
- Born: 26 October 1905; Scarborough, Yorkshire, England
- Died: 8 December 1992 (aged 87); Melrose, Roxburghshire, Scotland
- Batting: Right-handed
- Bowling: Right-arm medium

Domestic team information
- Years: Team
- 1948–1949: Scotland

Career statistics
Competition	First-class
Matches	2
Runs scored	7
Batting average	2.33
100s/50s	–/–
Top score	3*
Catches/stumpings	–/–
- Source: Cricinfo, 3 November 2022

Frederick Barkham (26 October 1905 – 8 December 1992) was an English first-class cricketer and cricket coach.

Barkham was born at Scarborough in October 1905. He was a professional cricketer who initially played his club cricket in England for Scarborough and South Kirkby Colliery. He proceeded to play club cricket in Scotland for Stirling County in the first half of the 1930s, before leaving the club in 1935 to take up a coaching and groundsman position at Dollar Academy in Clackmannanshire. He played club cricket for Clackmannanshire in the final years of the In 1938, he was put forward by Clackmannanshire to trial for the Scottish cricket team, but was unsuccessful. By 1947, he had moved onto to play for St Boswells in Roxburghshire. After showing good form for St Boswells, he was selected to play for Scotland in two first-class matches, against Warwickshire at Edgbaston on Scotland's 1948 tour of England, and against Yorkshire at Hull on their 1949 tour of England. He was unable to repeat his club form in these matches, scoring just 7 runs. He later coached Gala in 1955. In addition to playing at first-class level, Barkham also stood as an umpire in June 1963, when Scotland played the touring Pakistan Eaglets. Barkham died at Melrose in December 1992.
