= Winthorpe, Nottinghamshire =

Village and civil parish in Nottinghamshire, England

Coordinates: 53.1042°N 0.7860°W

Winthorpe
- Village and civil parish
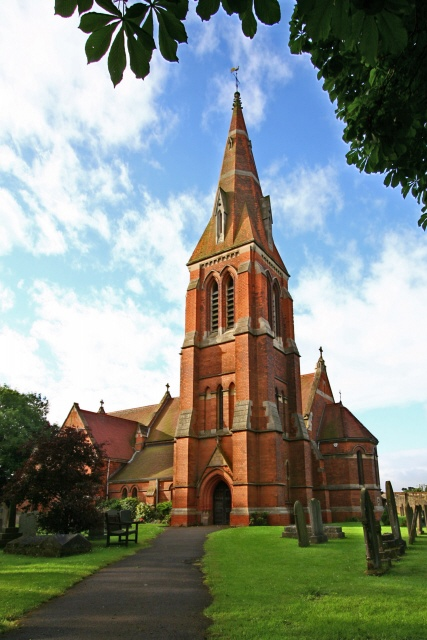
- All Saints' Church, Winthorpe

- Location within Nottinghamshire
- Interactive map of Winthorpe
- Area: 0.97 sq mi (2.5 km^{2})
- Population: 595 (2021)
  - Density: 613/sq mi (237/km^{2})
- OS grid reference: SK 815568
  - London: 115 mi (185 km) SSE
- District: Newark and Sherwood
- Shire county: Nottinghamshire
- Region: East Midlands
- Country: England
- Sovereign state: United Kingdom
- Post town: NEWARK
- Postcode district: NG24
- Dialling code: 01636
- Police: Nottinghamshire
- Fire: Nottinghamshire
- Ambulance: East Midlands
- UK Parliament: Newark
- Website: www.winthorpe.org.uk

Winthorpe is a village and civil parish located 2 miles (3 km) northeast of Newark-on-Trent in Nottinghamshire, England. The population at the 2011 census was 650, falling to 595 at the 2021 census.

The name is probably from old English wynne þrop (thorp), which translates as 'hamlet of joy'. An alternative etymology is Wigmund 's or Vigmund 's village.

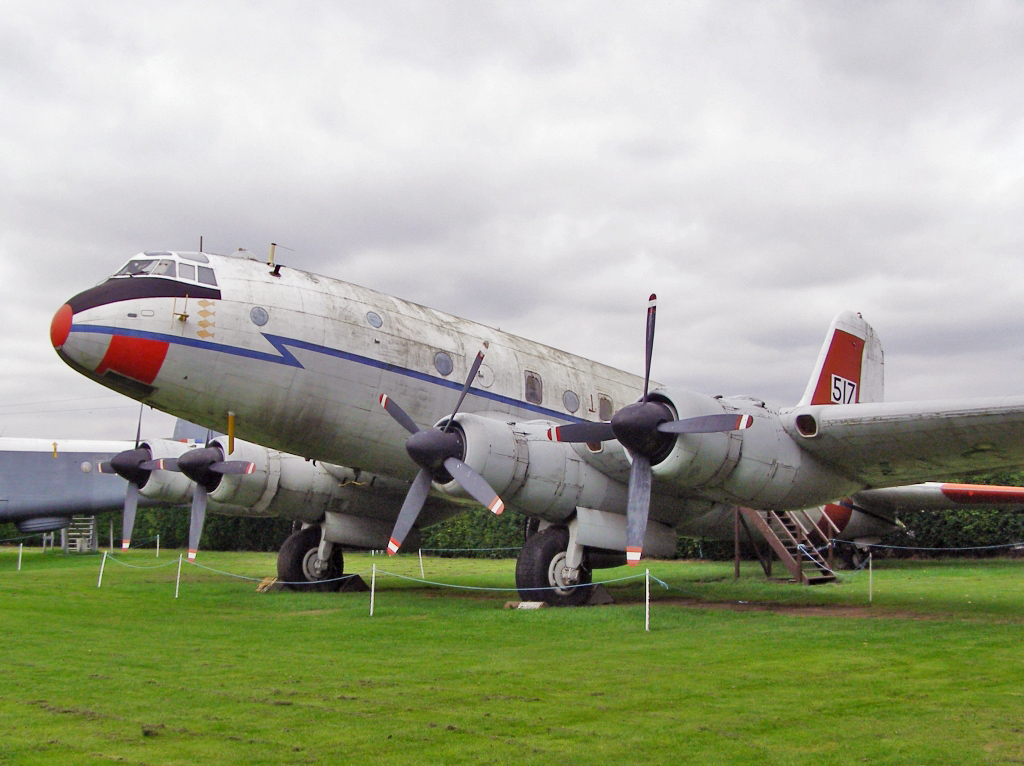
Newark Air Museum

Winthorpe has a village hall, a local pub called the Lord Nelson, and a community centre, where the events range from a monthly lunch club to an annual bonfire night celebration. Winthorpe also has a long-standing cricket tradition and has been the home to Winthorpe Cricket Club since 1887.

All Saints' Church, Winthorpe is the Church of England parish church in the village.

Newark Air Museum is an air museum located on the former Royal Air Force station, RAF Winthorpe. The airfield was mainly used for training Lancaster crews.

== See also ==
- Listed buildings in Winthorpe, Nottinghamshire
