= Boston (constituency) =

Parliamentary constituency in the United Kingdom, 1885–1918

- Former borough constituency for the House of Commons

1547–1918
- Seats: two (1547-1885); one (1885-1918)
- Created from: Lincolnshire
- Replaced by: Holland with Boston

1352–1353s
- Seats: two
- Replaced by: Lincolnshire

Boston was a parliamentary borough in Lincolnshire, which elected two Members of Parliament (MPs) to the House of Commons from 1547 until 1885, and then one member from 1885 until 1918, when the constituency was abolished.

== History ==
Boston first elected Members of Parliament in 1352–1353, but after that the right lapsed and was not revived again until the reign of Edward VI. The borough consisted of most of the town of Boston, a port and market town on the River Witham which had overgrown its original boundaries as the river had been cleared of silt and its trade developed. In 1831, the population of the borough was 11,240, contained 2,631 houses.

The right to vote belonged to the Mayor, aldermen, members of the common council and all resident freemen of the borough who paid scot and lot. This gave Boston a relatively substantial electorate for the period, 927 votes being cast in 1826 and 565 in 1831. The freedom was generally obtained either by birth (being the son of an existing freemen) or servitude (completing an apprenticeship in the town), but could also be conferred as an honorary status, and Boston charged a consistently escalating sum to its Parliamentary candidates who wanted to be admitted as freemen - set at £20 in 1700, it was raised to £50 in 1719, to £100 in 1790 and to £135 in 1800.

Major local landowners had some influence over election outcomes through deference of the voters - the Duke of Ancaster, for example, was generally allowed to choose one of the members up to the end of the 18th century - but in the last few years before the Reform Act at least one of the two members seems consistently to have been the free choice of the people of the town. However, bribery was rife in some of the early 19th-century elections, and the election of Thomas Fydell in 1802 was overturned when it was discovered that not only had he been paying electors five guineas for a vote, but that many of these were not qualified to vote anyway. (They were freemen not resident in the borough, whose names had been fraudulently entered as paying the poor rate at houses where they did not live, so as to appear eligible.)

Boston retained both its MPs under the Reform Act, but its boundaries were extended slightly, taking in more of the town and part of the neighbouring parish of Skirbeck. This increased the population of the borough to 12,818, although only 869 of these were eligible to vote in the first election after Reform; this had grown to just over 1,000 by the time of the Second Reform Act, when the widening of the franchise more than doubled it, over 2,500 electors being registered for the 1868 general election which followed. But by the 1870s, electoral corruption had again become a problem in Boston. The result of the 1874 election was overturned for bribery, and a Royal Commission set up to investigate; when the next general election, in 1880, had to be declared void for the same reasons, Boston's representation was suspended for the remainder of the Parliament.

Boston had its right to vote restored for the 1885 election, but the boundary changes which came into effect at the same time slightly reduced the size of the borough and allowed it only one MP. The constituency at this period was mainly middle-class but non-conformists had a strong presence, enabling the Liberals to be competitive where they might otherwise have struggled. The deciding factor which may have tilted the constituency towards the Conservatives in its final years may have been the benefit that the local fisherman saw in Tariff Reform.

The borough was abolished with effect from the general election of 1918, Boston being included in the new Holland with Boston county division.

== Boundaries ==
1832-1885: The old borough of Boston, the parish of Skirbeck, and the hamlet of Skirbeck Quarter, including the Fen Allotment of the hamlet of Skirbeck Quarter, but not the Fen Allotment of the parish of Skirbeck.

1885-1918: The existing parliamentary borough, excluding two detached parts situate to the north of the borough, one in East Fen and one in West Fen, and also excluding a part situate on the north side of the borough in the parishes of Sibsey and Frithville.

== Members of Parliament ==
1547-1640 — 1640-1880 — 1885-1918 — Jump to Elections

=== 1547-1640 ===
Year	First member	Second member
1547	John Wendon	William Naunton
1553 (Mar)	Leonard Irby	George Foster
1553 (Oct)	Francis Allen	George Foster
1554 (Apr)	Leonard Irby	George Foster
1554 (Nov)	Leonard Irby	George Foster
1555	Leonard Irby	George Foster
1558	Leonard Irby	George Foster
1559 (Jan)	Robert Carr	Leonard Irby
1562–3	Thomas Heneage, sat for Lincolnshire, replaced Jan 1563 by John Tamworth	Leonard Irby
1571	Christopher Hatton, sat for Higham Ferrers, replaced 1571 by Thomas Lyfield	Leonard Irby
1572	Stephen Thymbleby	William Dodington
1584 (Nov)	Nicholas Gorges	Vincent Skinner
1586 (Oct)	Vincent Skinner	Richard Stevenson
1588–9	Vincent Skinner	Anthony Irby
1593	Anthony Irby	Richard Stevenson
1597 (Sep)	Anthony Irby	Richard Stevenson
1601 (Oct)	Anthony Irby	Henry Capell
1604	Anthony Irby	Francis Bullingham
1614	Anthony Irby	Leonard Bawtree
1621	Anthony Irby	Sir Thomas Cheek, sat for Harwich replaced by Sir William Airmine
1624	William Boswell	Sir Clement Cotterell, sat for Grantham replaced by Sir William Airmine
1625	Sir Edward Barkham	William Boswell
1626	Sir Edward Barkham	Richard Oakley
1628	Richard Bellingham	Richard Oakley, unseated after petition replaced by Anthony Irby
1629–1640	No Parliaments summoned	

Back to Members of Parliament

=== 1640-1880 ===
Year	First member	First party	Second member	Second party
April 1640	William Ellis	Parliamentarian	Sir Anthony Irby	
November 1640	William Ellis	Parliamentarian	Sir Anthony Irby	Parliamentarian
December 1648	William Ellis	Parliamentarian	Irby excluded in Pride's Purge - seat vacant	
1653	Boston was unrepresented in the Barebones Parliament			
1654	William Ellis		Boston had only one seat in the First and Second Parliaments of the Protectorate	
1656	Sir Anthony Irby		Boston had only one seat in the First and Second Parliaments of the Protectorate	
January 1659	Sir Anthony Irby		Francis Mussenden	
May 1659	William Ellis		One seat vacant in restored Rump	
February 1660	William Ellis		Sir Anthony Irby	
April 1660	Thomas Hatcher		Sir Anthony Irby	
1661	Lord Willoughby de Eresby		Sir Anthony Irby	
1666	Sir Philip Harcourt		Sir Anthony Irby	
February 1679	Sir William Ellis		Sir Anthony Irby	
May 1679	Sir William Yorke		Sir Anthony Irby	
1685	Lord Willoughby de Eresby		Peregrine Bertie	
1689	Lord Willoughby de Eresby		Sir William Yorke	
1690	Peregrine Bertie		Sir William Yorke	
1698	Richard Wynn		Edmund Boulter	
January 1701	Sir William Yorke		Edmund Boulter	
December 1701	Sir William Yorke		Peregrine Bertie	
1702	Sir Edward Irby		Peregrine Bertie	
1705	Sir Edward Irby		Richard Wynn	
1708	Peregrine Bertie		Richard Wynn	
1711	William Cotesworth		Richard Wynn	
1713	Henry Heron		Richard Wynn	
1719	Henry Heron		Richard Ellys	
1722	Henry Pacey		Richard Ellys	
1730	The Lord Coleraine		Richard Ellys	
1734	Albemarle Bertie		Richard Fydell	
1741	Lord Vere Bertie		John Michell	
1754	Lord Robert Bertie		Charles Amcotts	
1761	Lord Robert Bertie		John Michell	
1766	Lord Robert Bertie		Charles Amcotts	
1777	Lord Robert Bertie		Humphrey Sibthorp	
1782	Sir Peter Burrell		Humphrey Sibthorp	
1784	Sir Peter Burrell		Dalhousie Watherston	
1790	Sir Peter Burrell		Thomas Fydell I	Tory
1796	Thomas Colyear	Whig	Thomas Fydell I	Tory
1802	William Madocks	Whig	Thomas Fydell I	Tory
1803	William Madocks	Whig	Thomas Fydell II	Tory
1806	William Madocks	Whig	Thomas Fydell I	Tory
1812	William Madocks	Whig	Peter Drummond-Burrell	Whig
1820	Gilbert Heathcote	Whig	Henry Ellis	Tory
1821	Gilbert Heathcote	Whig	William Augustus Johnson	Whig
1826	Gilbert Heathcote	Whig	Neil Malcolm	Tory
1830	John Wilks	Radical	Neil Malcolm	Tory
1831	John Wilks	Radical	Gilbert Heathcote	Whig
1832	John Wilks	Radical	Benjamin Handley	Whig
1835	John Wilks	Radical	John Studholme Brownrigg	Conservative
1837	Sir James Duke	Whig	John Studholme Brownrigg	Conservative
1847	Sir James Duke	Whig	Benjamin Bond Cabbell	Conservative
1849	Hon. Dudley Pelham	Whig	Benjamin Bond Cabbell	Conservative
1851	James William Freshfield	Conservative	Benjamin Bond Cabbell	Conservative
1852	Gilbert Heathcote	Whig	Benjamin Bond Cabbell	Conservative
1856	Herbert Ingram	Radical	Benjamin Bond Cabbell	Conservative
1857	Herbert Ingram	Radical	William Henry Adams	Peelite
1859	Herbert Ingram	Liberal	Meaburn Staniland	Liberal
1860	John Malcolm	Conservative	Meaburn Staniland	Liberal
1865	John Malcolm	Conservative	Thomas Parry	Liberal
1866	John Malcolm	Conservative	Meaburn Staniland	Liberal
1867	John Malcolm	Conservative	Thomas Parry	Liberal
1868	John Malcolm	Conservative	Thomas Collins	Conservative
1874	William Ingram	Liberal	Thomas Parry	Liberal
1874	William Ingram	Liberal	John Malcolm	Conservative
1878	William Ingram	Liberal	Thomas Garfit	Conservative
1880	Representation suspended			

Back to Members of Parliament

=== 1885-1918 ===
Election	Member	Party
1885	Representation restored and reduced to one Member	
1885	William Ingram	Liberal
1886	Henry Farmer-Atkinson	Conservative
1892	Sir William Ingram	Liberal
1895	William Garfit	Conservative
1906	George Faber	Liberal
Jan. 1910	Charles Harvey Dixon	Conservative
1918	constituency abolished	

Back to Members of Parliament

== Elections ==
1830s – 1840s – 1850s – 1860s – 1870s – 1880s – 1890s – 1900s – 1910s

=== Elections in the 1830s ===
General election 1830: Boston (2 seats)
Party	Candidate	Votes	%	±%
Tory	Neil Malcolm	337	41.2	
Radical	John Wilks	294	36.0	
Whig	Charles Keightley Tunnard	186	22.8	
Turnout		503		
Majority		43	5.2	
Tory hold		Swing		
Majority		108	13.2	N/A
Radical gain from Whig		Swing		

General election 1831: Boston (2 seats)
Party	Candidate	Votes	%	±%
Whig	Gilbert Heathcote	265	46.9	+24.1
Radical	John Wilks	249	44.1	+8.1
Tory	Neil Malcolm	51	9.0	−32.2
Turnout		354		
Majority		214	37.9	N/A
Whig gain from Tory		Swing	+20.1	
Majority		198	35.1	+21.9
Radical hold		Swing	+12.1	

General election 1832: Boston (2 seats)
Party	Candidate	Votes	%	±%
Radical	John Wilks	509	39.3	−4.8
Whig	Benjamin Handley	433	33.4	−13.5
Tory	John Studholme Brownrigg	353	27.3	+18.3
Turnout		788	90.7	
Registered electors		869		
Majority		76	5.9	−29.2
Radical hold		Swing	−7.0	
Majority		80	6.1	−31.8
Whig hold		Swing	−11.3	

General election 1835: Boston (2 seats)
Party	Candidate	Votes	%	±%
Conservative	John Studholme Brownrigg	532	44.0	+16.7
Radical	John Wilks	356	29.4	−9.9
Whig	Benjamin Handley	321	26.6	−6.8
Turnout		813	86.7	−4.0
Registered electors		938		
Majority		211	17.4	N/A
Conservative gain from Whig		Swing	+10.1	
Majority		35	2.8	−3.1
Radical hold		Swing	−3.3	

General election 1837: Boston (2 seats)
Party	Candidate	Votes	%	±%
Conservative	John Studholme Brownrigg	459	32.6	+10.6
Whig	James Duke	442	31.4	+18.1
Whig	Benjamin Handley	350	24.9	+11.6
Conservative	William Rickford Collett	156	11.1	−10.9
Turnout		839	87.9	+1.2
Registered electors		955		
Majority		109	7.7	−9.7
Conservative hold		Swing	−2.1	
Majority		286	20.3	N/A
Whig gain from Radical		Swing	+9.1	

=== Elections in the 1840s ===
General election 1841: Boston (2 seats)
Party	Candidate	Votes	%	±%
Conservative	John Studholme Brownrigg	527	34.9	+2.3
Whig	James Duke	515	34.2	−22.1
Conservative	Charles Alexander Wood	466	30.9	+19.8
Turnout		920	80.3	−7.6
Registered electors		1,146		
Majority		12	0.7	−7.0
Conservative hold		Swing	+6.7	
Majority		49	3.3	−17.0
Whig hold		Swing	−22.1	

General election 1847: Boston (2 seats)
Party	Candidate	Votes	%	±%
Whig	James Duke	590	42.3	+8.1
Conservative	Benjamin Bond Cabbell	466	33.4	−32.4
Radical	David William Wire	339	24.3	N/A
Turnout		698 (est)	64.4 (est)	−15.9
Registered electors		1,083		
Majority		124	8.9	+5.6
Whig hold		Swing	+12.2	
Majority		127	9.1	+8.4
Conservative hold		Swing	−18.2	

Duke resigned by accepting the office of Steward of the Chiltern Hundreds in order to contest a by-election at City of London.

By-election, 2 August 1849: Boston
Party	Candidate	Votes	%	±%
Whig	Dudley Pelham	422	56.8	+14.5
Radical	David William Wire	321	43.2	+18.9
Majority		101	13.6	+4.7
Turnout		743	77.2	+12.8
Registered electors		963		
Whig hold		Swing	−2.2	

Back to elections

=== Elections in the 1850s ===
Pelham's death caused a by-election.

By-election, 22 April 1851: Boston
Party	Candidate	Votes	%	±%
Conservative	James William Freshfield	368	59.5	+26.1
Radical	David William Wire	251	40.5	+16.2
Majority		117	19.0	N/A
Turnout		619	64.0	−0.4
Registered electors		967		
Conservative gain from Whig		Swing	+5.0	

Wire retired from the contest.

General election 1852: Boston (2 seats)
Party	Candidate	Votes	%	±%
Whig	Gilbert Heathcote	547	33.4	N/A
Conservative	Benjamin Bond Cabbell	490	29.9	−3.5
Whig	John Alexander Hankey	437	26.6	N/A
Whig	Thomson Hankey	148	9.0	N/A
Peelite	William Henry Adams	18	1.1	New
Turnout		820 (est)	83.1 (est)	+18.7
Registered electors		987		
Majority		57	3.5	−5.4
Whig hold		Swing		
Majority		53	3.3	−5.8
Conservative hold		Swing		

Heathcote resigned to contest the 1856 by-election at Rutland.

By-election, 7 March 1856: Boston
Party	Candidate	Votes	%	±%
Radical	Herbert Ingram	521	63.8	N/A
Peelite	William Henry Adams	296	36.2	+35.1
Majority		225	27.6	N/A
Turnout		817	81.5	−1.6
Registered electors		1,003		
Radical gain from Whig		Swing		

General election 1857: Boston (2 seats)
Party	Candidate	Votes	%	±%
Radical	Herbert Ingram	Unopposed		
Peelite	William Henry Adams	Unopposed		
Registered electors		1,057		
Radical gain from Whig				
Peelite hold				

Herbert's appointment as Recorder of Derby required a by-election.

By-election, 3 February 1859: Boston
Party	Candidate	Votes	%	±%
Peelite	William Henry Adams	Unopposed		
Peelite hold				

General election 1859: Boston (2 seats)
Party	Candidate	Votes	%	±%
Liberal	Herbert Ingram	621	37.3	N/A
Liberal	Meaburn Staniland	593	35.6	N/A
Conservative	John Hardwick Hollway	452	27.1	N/A
Majority		141	8.5	N/A
Turnout		833 (est)	77.3 (est)	N/A
Registered electors		1,078		
Liberal hold		Swing	N/A	
Liberal gain from Conservative		Swing	N/A	

Back to elections

=== Elections in the 1860s ===
Ingram's death caused a by-election.

By-election, 30 Oct 1860: Boston (1 Seat)
Party	Candidate	Votes	%	±%
Conservative	John Malcolm	533	63.8	+36.7
Liberal	George Parker Tuxford	303	36.2	−36.7
Majority		230	27.6	N/A
Turnout		836	82.0	+4.7
Registered electors		1,019		
Conservative gain from Liberal		Swing	+36.7	

General election 1865: Boston (2 Seats)
Party	Candidate	Votes	%	±%
Conservative	John Malcolm	646	41.3	+14.2
Liberal	Thomas Parry*	465	29.7	−7.6
Liberal	Meaburn Staniland	453	29.0	−6.6
Majority		193	12.3	N/A
Turnout		782 (est)	71.7 (est)	−5.6
Registered electors		1,090		
Conservative gain from Liberal		Swing	+14.2	
Liberal hold		Swing	−7.1	

* On petition, Parry's election was declared void on grounds of bribery and Staniland was duly elected in his place.

Staniland then resigned, causing a by-election.

By-election, 16 Mar 1867: Boston (1 Seat)
Party	Candidate	Votes	%	±%
Liberal	Thomas Parry	Unopposed		
Liberal hold				

General election 1868: Boston (2 Seats)
Party	Candidate	Votes	%	±%
Conservative	John Malcolm	1,306	29.8	+9.1
Conservative	Thomas Collins	1,119	25.5	+4.8
Liberal	Meaburn Staniland	1,029	23.5	−5.5
Liberal	Thomas Mason Jones	926	21.1	−8.6
Majority		90	2.0	−10.3
Turnout		2,190 (est)	86.7 (est)	+15.0
Registered electors		2,527		
Conservative hold		Swing	+8.9	
Conservative gain from Liberal		Swing	+5.2	

Back to elections

=== Elections in the 1870s ===
General election 1874: Boston (2 Seats)
Party	Candidate	Votes	%	±%
Liberal	William Ingram	1,572	37.1	+13.6
Conservative	John Malcolm	996	23.5	−6.3
Liberal	Thomas Parry	994*	23.4	+2.3
Conservative	Thomas Collins	679	16.0	−9.5
Turnout		2,297 (est)	86.6 (est)	−0.1
Registered electors		2,651		
Majority		893	21.1	N/A
Liberal gain from Conservative		Swing	+11.6	
Majority		2	0.1	−1.9
Conservative hold		Swing	−4.3	

* An election petition found extensive bribery relating to Parry's votes, which on the initial count totalled 1,347. However, 353 of these were struck off - and further may have been taken if the process had not stopped on 8 June 1874 - leading to Malcolm's election instead. A Royal Commission was established to investigate the borough. A separate petition against Ingram was dropped.

In 1878, Malcolm then resigned in order to contest a by-election in Argyllshire, leading to a by-election in Boston.

By-election, 12 Aug 1878: Boston (1 Seat)
Party	Candidate	Votes	%	±%
Conservative	Thomas Garfit	Unopposed		
Conservative hold				

Back to elections

=== Elections in the 1880s ===
General election 1880: Boston (2 Seats)
Party	Candidate	Votes	%	±%
Conservative	Thomas Garfit	1,412	26.6	+3.1
Liberal	William Ingram	1,367	25.7	−11.4
Conservative	George Fydell Rowley	1,350	25.4	+9.4
Liberal	Sydney Buxton	1,182	22.3	−1.1
Turnout		2,656 (est)	85.8 (est)	−0.8
Registered electors		3,094		
Majority		45	0.9	+0.8
Conservative hold		Swing	+2.1	
Majority		17	0.3	−13.3
Liberal hold		Swing	−10.4	

Bribery convictions led to the Boston writ being suspended and the 1880 result being voided. The seat was again reconstituted in 1885, when it was reduced to one member.

General election 1885: Boston (1 seat)
Party	Candidate	Votes	%	±%
Liberal	William Ingram	1,295	56.5	+8.5
Conservative	Nehemiah Learoyd	996	43.5	−8.5
Majority		299	13.0	+12.7
Turnout		2,291	84.3	−1.5 (est)
Registered electors		2,718		
Liberal hold		Swing	+8.5	

General election 1886: Boston
Party	Candidate	Votes	%	±%
Conservative	Henry Atkinson	1,192	51.0	+7.5
Liberal	William Ingram	1,144	49.0	−7.5
Majority		48	2.0	N/A
Turnout		2,336	85.9	+1.6
Registered electors		2,718		
Conservative gain from Liberal		Swing	+7.5	

Back to elections

=== Elections in the 1890s ===
Willoughby

General election 1892: Boston
Party	Candidate	Votes	%	±%
Liberal	William Ingram	1,355	51.2	+2.2
Conservative	Gilbert Heathcote-Drummond-Willoughby	1,293	48.8	−2.2
Majority		62	2.4	N/A
Turnout		2,648	86.7	+0.8
Registered electors		3,054		
Liberal gain from Conservative		Swing	+2.2	

Garfit

General election 1895: Boston
Party	Candidate	Votes	%	±%
Conservative	William Garfit	1,633	56.9	+8.1
Liberal	William Ingram	1,237	43.1	−8.1
Majority		396	13.8	N/A
Turnout		2,870	87.0	+0.3
Registered electors		3,299		
Conservative gain from Liberal		Swing	+8.1	

Back to elections

=== Elections in the 1900s ===
General election 1900: Boston
Party	Candidate	Votes	%	±%
Conservative	William Garfit	1,710	59.7	+2.8
Liberal	William Turner Simonds	1,155	40.3	−2.8
Majority		555	19.4	+5.6
Turnout		2,865	83.1	−3.9
Registered electors		3,448		
Conservative hold		Swing	+2.8	

Faber

General election 1906: Boston
Party	Candidate	Votes	%	±%
Liberal	George Faber	1,801	51.5	+11.2
Conservative	William Garfit	1,694	48.5	−11.2
Majority		107	3.0	N/A
Turnout		3,495	89.7	+6.6
Registered electors		3,896		
Liberal gain from Conservative		Swing	+11.2	

Back to elections

=== Elections in the 1910s ===
General election January 1910: Boston
Party	Candidate	Votes	%	±%
Conservative	Charles Harvey Dixon	1,975	53.5	+5.0
Liberal	Henry Lunn	1,715	46.5	−5.0
Majority		260	7.0	10.0
Turnout		3,690	91.4	+1.7
Conservative gain from Liberal		Swing	+5.0	

Hemphill

General election December 1910: Boston
Party	Candidate	Votes	%	±%
Conservative	Charles Harvey Dixon	1,875	52.3	−1.2
Liberal	Fitzroy Hemphill	1,712	47.7	+1.2
Majority		163	4.6	−2.4
Turnout		3,587	88.9	−2.5
Conservative hold		Swing	−1.2	

General Election 1914–15:

Another General Election was required to take place before the end of 1915. The political parties had been making preparations for an election to take place and by July 1914, the following candidates had been selected;

- Unionist: Charles Harvey Dixon
- Liberal: F. Stapleton Hiley

Back to Top
