= William Ellis (solicitor-general) =

English lawyer, judge and politician

Sir William Ellis (1609–1680) was an English lawyer, judge and politician who sat in the House of Commons at various times between 1640 and 1679, and supported the Parliamentary cause in the English Civil War.

== Life ==
Ellis was second son of Sir Thomas Ellis of Grantham, Lincolnshire. He was educated at Christ's College, Cambridge, graduating B.A. in 1627. Having entered Gray's Inn on 6 November 1627 he was called to the bar on 9 February 1634. He represented Boston, Lincolnshire, in the Short Parliament of 1640, and also in the Long Parliament.

After Pride's Purge Ellis was readmitted to the House of Commons on 4 June 1649. On 24 May 1654, he was appointed solicitor-general. Shortly afterwards he was elected an ancient of his inn. As solicitor-general he took part in the prosecution of those involved in the Gerard's conspiracy: John Gerard, Peter Vowell, and Summerset Fox on the charge of corresponding with Charles Stuart and conspiring to assassinate the Lord Protector Oliver Cromwell. The trial took place in June 1654. Gerard and Vowell pleaded innocent. They were convicted and sentenced to death. Gerard was beheaded and Vowell was hanged (Fox pleaded guilty and was sentenced to transportation).

The same year, Ellis was again returned to Parliament for Boston, and in 1656 for Grantham. He was a member of the committee appointed to frame statutes for Durham College in March 1656.

In June 1658, he was engaged in the prosecution of John Hewett and John Mordaunt, charged with levying war against the Protector. Hewett was found guilty and Mordaunt acquitted. He was created a baronet by the Lord Protector Oliver Cromwell on or soon after 31 May 1658. The baronetcy passed into oblivion at the Restoration in May 1660 and unlike some others was not renewed.

Ellis continued in the office of solicitor-general under the second Lord Protector Richard Cromwell. At the election in January 1658-59 for the Third Protectorate Parliament he retained his seat for Grantham. In the debate on the competency of the Scottish members he spoke at length in support of their claims (18 March 1659).

Re-elected for Grantham in 1660, Ellis was excluded from the house on the score of his opinions. In autumn 1664 he was appointed reader at Gray's Inn, of which he had been elected a bencher in 1659; on 26 August 1669 he took the degree of serjeant-at-law, and, on 10 April 1671, he was advanced to the rank of king's Serjeant and knighted. He was raised to the bench in 1673, taking his seat in the Court of Common Pleas on the first day of Hilary term. The only case of public interest which came before him was that of Barnardiston v. Swaine, an election case. Ellis was removed in 1676, without reason assigned, but reinstated on 5 May 1679, having been returned to parliament for Boston in the preceding February.

He sat as one of the judges at the last of the major Popish Plot trials, when Lionel Anderson and six other Catholic priests were tried on the capital charge of acting as priests in England, contrary to the statute of 1585. In contrast to previous Plot trials, the proceedings were conducted in a courteous and civilized fashion, and though the priests were found guilty and sentenced to death, they were all reprieved.

He died on 3 December 1680 at his chambers in Serjeants' Inn.

== Notes ==
Parliament of England
Parliament suspended since 1629	Member of Parliament for Boston; 1640–1653; With: Sir Anthony Irby 1640–1648	Not represented in Barebones Parliament
Not represented in Barebones Parliament	Member of Parliament for Boston; 1654	Succeeded by Sir Anthony Irby
Preceded by William Bury	Member of Parliament for Grantham; 1656–1659; With: Thomas Skipwith 1659	Not represented in restored Rump
Preceded by Sir Anthony Irby; Francis Mussenden	Member of Parliament for Boston; 1659–1660; With: Sir Anthony Irby 1660	Succeeded by Sir Anthony Irby; Thomas Hatcher
