= William Naunton =

English Member of Parliament

William Naunton (by 1511-52/53), of Alderton, Suffolk, was an English Member of Parliament.

He was a Member (MP) of the Parliament of England for Boston in 1547.
