= William Boswell =

English diplomat and politician

Sir William Boswell (died 1650) was an English diplomat and politician who sat in the House of Commons in 1624 and 1625. He was a resident ambassador to the Netherlands from 1632 to 1649.

== Life ==
William Boswell was a native of Suffolk. He was educated at Jesus College, Cambridge, of which he was elected fellow in 1606. He was incorporated at Oxford University on 12 July 1608 and became proctor in 1624. He was one of the keepers of the state paper office and served as secretary to Baron Herbert. In 1624 he was elected Member of Parliament for Boston in a by-election to the Happy Parliament. He was re-elected MP for Boston in 1625.

Boswell subsequently entered the diplomatic service, and was appointed secretary to Sir Dudley Carleton, then ambassador at The Hague. Boswell eventually succeeded Carleton in 1632. He was knighted at Bockstal near Baldock on 25 July 1633.

A large share of Sir William's attention while ambassador was taken up with the controversy between the Gomarists and the Remonstrants (Arminians). He continued the policy of Sir Dudley Carleton, and supported the rigidly Calvinist Gomarists against the Remonstrants. This was for political reasons, and otherwise Boswell was an ally of William Laud. He took a close interest in the émigré English churches in the Netherlands, and in 1633-4 helped John Paget intrigue against John Davenport. Charles I ordered Boswell to back Edward Misselden, influential in the Merchant Adventurers, against John Forbes. In 1638 Boswell had a prosecution brought against John Canne. He was now poised against the Gomarists, and worked together with Remonstrants to combat Scottish Covenanter propaganda.

When the First English Civil War broke out, Boswell's efforts were directed towards preserving the neutrality of the Dutch. Despite the efforts of Walter Strickland, who was sent over by Oliver Cromwell to counteract his influence, he was quite successful in his political mission. He could not prevent Parliament appealing to Dutch public opinion, however. Despite Boswell's appeals to the Dutch authorities to ban Parliamentary propaganda, it circulated widely in the Republic, and Boswell found himself compelled to respond by publishing royalist pamphlets.

Sir William was also a man of letters and a scholar, as is shown in his correspondence with John de Laet, which touches upon subjects ranging from Oriental literature and the compilation of an Arab dictionary to Edward VI's treatise 'De Primatu Papae,' and Sir Simon d'Ewes's Saxon vocabulary. Another correspondent was the Laudian Stephen Goffe.

== Notes and references ==
- This article incorporates text from a publication now in the public domain: "Boswell, Sir William". Dictionary of National Biography. London: Smith, Elder & Co. 1885–1900.

=== Sources ===
- Keith L. Sprunger (1982), Dutch Puritanism: a history of English and Scottish churches of the Netherlands in the sixteenth and seventeenth centuries

Parliament of England
| Preceded by Sir William Airmine; Sir Clement Cotterell | Member of Parliament for Boston; 1624–1625; With: Sir William Airmine 1624; Sir Edward Barkham | Succeeded by Sir Edward Barkham; Richard Oakley |
