= Thomas Garfit =

British politician

Thomas Garfit (1815 – 29 May 1883) was a British Conservative Party politician.

He was elected as a member of parliament (MP) for the borough of Boston in Lincolnshire at an unopposed by-election in August 1878, after the resignation of the Conservative MP John Wingfield Malcolm. Garfit was re-elected at the 1880 general election, but an election petition was lodged against the result, and the election was declared void on 3 August 1880. The writ was suspended, and a royal commission was established to investigate elections in the borough.

Parliament of the United Kingdom
Preceded by John Wingfield Malcolm; William James Ingram	Member of Parliament for Boston; 1878 – 1880; With: William James Ingram	Representation suspended
