= Benjamin Handley =

British politician

Benjamin Handley (9 January 1784 – 16 May 1858) was an English soldier and Liberal politician who sat in the House of Commons from 1832 to 1835. His family were prominent in Lincolnshire during the 18th and 19th Centuries.

== Biography ==
Handley was the third son of William Handley of Newark. He entered the army in 1805 and served in the 9th Light Dragoons in South America and in the Peninsular War. In 1813, whilst crossing the Tagus river, his boat capsized. Although he survived, his cousin (also called Benjamin) who was in the same boat drowned.

After returning to England, he lived at Pointon, Lincolnshire. At the 1832 general election he was elected Member of Parliament (MP) for Boston, a seat that he held until 1835.

Handley died at Pointon at the age of 74.
