= Sir Edward Barkham, 1st Baronet, of South Acre =

17th-century English politician

- Born: 1591
- Died: 2 August 1667 (aged 75–76)
- Occupation: English politician

Sir Edward Barkham, 1st Baronet of South Acre and of Tottenham High Cross, Middlesex (1591 – 2 August 1667) was an English politician who sat in the House of Commons in 1625 and 1626.

Barkham was the son of Sir Edward Barkham. He matriculated at King's College, Cambridge in spring 1611 and was awarded BA in 1613 on the visit of Prince Charles. He was admitted at Lincoln's Inn on 13 February 1614. He was knighted in 1623 and then created a baronet in the Baronetage of England on 26 June 1623. In 1625 he was elected member of parliament for Boston. He was re-elected MP for Boston in 1626. In 1635 he became High Sheriff of Norfolk.

Barkham married Frances, daughter of Sir Thomas Berney of Reedham, Norfolk, and had issue, including Margaret Barkham, wife of Sir Edmund Jenings.

Barkham died at Tottenham then in Middlesex at the age of 72. He was succeeded by his son Sir Edward Barkham, 2nd Baronet.

Parliament of England
| Preceded by Sir William Airmine, 1st Baronet; William Boswell | Member of Parliament for Boston; 1625–1626; With: William Boswell 1625; Richard Oakley 1626 | Succeeded by Richard Bellingham; Richard Oakley |
Baronetage of England
| New creation | Baronet (of South Acre); 1623–1667 | Succeeded by Edward Barkham |
