= John Wilks =

English Whig Party politician (1776–1854)

John Wilks (1776 – 25 August 1854) was an English Whig Party politician who sat in the House of Commons from 1830 to 1837.

== Life ==
Wilks was the son of Matthew Wilks, minister of the Whitefield's Tabernacle, Moorfields. He was for many years the vestry clerk and chief manager of the parochial affairs of St Luke's Old Street. He became secretary of the Protestant Society for the protection of religious liberty when it was formed in 1811.

In 1830, Wilks was elected member of parliament for Boston with the plagiaristic (having originated from John Wilkes) battle-cry of his supporters "Wilks and Liberty". He held the seat until 1837.

In 1834 he was in two religious disputes. In one "His conduct at the Tabernacle, in Moorfields, completely destroyed the small remains of confidence which they were disposed to repose in him", and in the other "Mr. Wilks has given no proof, as a manager, of zeal for the glory of God in the place, or of interest in the prosperity of its institutions:—Resolved,—That, in the judgment of this Meeting, John Wilks, Esq. M.P., for the above and other reasons, is not a fit and proper person to act as an office-bearer in the Church of God".

Wilks died at the age of 77.

== Family ==
Wilks was survived by a son John, and three daughters. His son Rowland, vestry clerk, predeceased him in 1838. One of the daughters, Mary Mullis, married James Parsons.
