= John Malcolm, 1st Baron Malcolm of Poltalloch =

British soldier and politician

Lieutenant-Colonel John Wingfield Malcolm, 1st Baron Malcolm of Poltalloch, CB, VD (16 April 1833 – 6 March 1902) was a British soldier and Conservative politician.

== Background and education ==
Malcolm was the son of John Malcolm, 14th feudal baron of Poltalloch, Argyll, and Isabella Harriet, daughter of John Wingfield. He was educated at Eton and Christ Church, Oxford.

== Political career ==
Malcolm was elected Member of Parliament for Boston in 1860, resigning in 1878 by becoming Steward of the Manor of Northstead. He was later Member of Parliament for Argyllshire from 1885 to 1892. He was appointed a Companion of the Order of the Bath in 1892 and raised to the peerage as Baron Malcolm of Poltalloch, in the County of Argyll, in 1896.

He was a Captain of the Kent Artillery Militia and Honourable Colonel of the 5th Voluntary Battalion, Argyll and Sutherland Highlanders.

In 1870 Malcolm played football for Scotland in the first unofficial England v Scotland International. He was one of two sitting MPs to play for Scotland in this match, the other being William Henry Gladstone.

== Personal life ==
Lord Malcolm married firstly the Honourable Alice Frederica Irby, daughter of George Irby, 4th Baron Boston, in 1861. After her death in October 1896 he married secondly Marie Jane Lilian, widow of H. Gardner Lister, in 1897. Both marriages were childless.

He died at Hyères, France, on 6 March 1902, aged 68, when the barony became extinct. He left his estate to his younger brother Colonel Edward Donald Malcolm (1837–1930), who also succeeded as Laird of Poltalloch. The latter's son was Conservative politician Sir Ian Malcolm (1868–1944).

Lady Malcolm of Poltalloch remained a widow until her death in August 1927.

Parliament of the United Kingdom
Preceded by Herbert Ingram; Meaburn Staniland	Member of Parliament for Boston; 1860–1878; With: Meaburn Staniland, to 1865; Thomas Parry 1865–1866; Meaburn Staniland 1866–1867; Thomas Parry, 1867–1868; Thomas Collins 1868–1874	Succeeded by William Ingram; Thomas Parry
Preceded by Donald Horne Macfarlane	Member of Parliament for Argyllshire; 1886–1892	Succeeded by Donald Horne Macfarlane
Peerage of the United Kingdom
New creation	Baron Malcolm of Poltalloch; 1896–1902	Extinct
