= Bruce Ingram =

British publishing entrepreneur and philanthropist (1877–1963)

Sir Bruce Stirling Ingram MC
- Born: 5 May 1877; London, England
- Died: 8 January 1963 (aged 85)
- Occupation: Publisher
- Spouse(s): Amy Foy (m. 1904) Lily Grundy (m. 1947; died 1962)
- Parents: Sir William Ingram (father); Mary Eliza Collingwood Stirling (mother)
- Relatives: Collingwood Ingram (brother); Herbert Ingram (paternal grandfather); Edward Stirling (maternal grandfather); Edward Charles Stirling (uncle); Lancelot Stirling (uncle); Sydney Grundy (father-in-law)
- Awards: Legion of Honour – (1950)
- Military career
- Allegiance: United Kingdom
- Branch: British Army
- Service years: 1898-1918
- Rank: Captain
- Units: Royal East Kent Yeomanry; Royal Garrison Artillery
- Conflicts: World War I; Western Front
- Awards: Military Cross; Legion d'Honneur

Sir Bruce Stirling Ingram MC (5 May 1877 – 8 January 1963) was a British publishing entrepreneur and philanthropist. He was the editor of The English Illustrated Magazine (September 1899 – September 1901), The Sketch, and The Illustrated London News from 1900 to 1963. Ingram was credited with introducing greater use of photography in the News and introducing the Rembrandt Regalio process which enabled faster printing of the paper.

== Life ==
Ingram was born in London, England, the second of three sons to Sir William Ingram, 1st Baronet, and Mary Eliza Collingwood Stirling (d.1925). His maternal grandfather Edward Stirling was born in Jamaica to a Scottish planter and an unnamed woman of colour. He concealed his racial identity and later settled in South Australia, where he was elected to parliament; his sons (Ingram's uncles) Lancelot and Edward Charles Stirling were also members of parliament.

Ingram was Chairman of Illustrated London News and Sketch Ltd., Director of Illustrated Sporting and Dramatic News Ltd, and President of Illustrated Newspapers Ltd. These had been founded by his grandfather, Herbert Ingram.

He was commissioned a second lieutenant in the Royal East Kent Yeomanry on 14 May 1898, and promoted to lieutenant on 14 March 1900. The Yeomanry regiments were reserve forces. During the First World War he had a distinguished service record. He joined as a lieutenant in the East Kent Yeomanry, then transferred to the Royal Garrison Artillery in France and rose to the rank of captain. He was awarded the Military Cross for bravery in 1917 and was mentioned in dispatches three times.

He was also Hon. Vice-president, Society for Nautical Research, Hon. Keeper of Drawings, Fitzwilliam Museum, Cambridge and Hon. Adviser on pictures and drawings, National Maritime Museum, Greenwich.

He was knighted in the 1950 King's Birthday Honours List and received the French Legion d'Honneur in the same year.

In 1957 (to mark his 80th birthday) he presented 700 seascape drawings by the Van de Velde family to the Greenwich Maritime Museum.

Oxford University awarded him an honorary Doctor of Letters (D.Litt.) in 1960.

After death, he left a substantial number of paintings (mainly seascapes and naval scenes) to the Greenwich Maritime Museum now known as The Ingram Collection. Major donations of art and archaeological artefacts were also made to the Fitzwilliam Museum, Birmingham Museum and Art Gallery and the Royal Scottish Museum. He also donated the painting Angelique et Medor to the Louvre in 1953.

== Notable employees ==
Ingram chose his journalists and columnists carefully. In 1905 he employed G. K. Chesterton to write the Notebook feature in his papers. On Chesterton's death in 1936 Ingram replaced him with Arthur Bryant.

== Family ==
In 1904 he married Amy Foy, they had one daughter, Averil Stirling Bruce (b.1905), and one son, David Martin Bruce Ingram (1917–1930). In 1947, following his wife's death, he married Lily (d. 1962), daughter of the playwright Sydney Grundy. They had one son, who died in childhood.

== Publications ==
Over and above his journalism, Ingram was a writer on subjects pertaing to his passions: Egyptian archaeology and maritime history (linking to his love of seascapes). His works include:

- Three Sea Journals of the Stuart Times (1936)

== Other notable contributions ==
Ingram organised and paid for the Battle of Britain Roll of Honour to the losses of the Royal Air Force which stands in Westminster Abbey.

== See also ==
- Ingram baronets
