= Collingwood Ingram =

British ornithologist, plant collector & gardener (1880-1981)

- Ingram in 1905 in England
- Born: 30 October 1880
- Died: 19 May 1981 (aged 100); Benenden, Kent, England
- Occupations: Ornithologist & horticulturalist
- Spouse: Florence Maude Laing (m. 1906)
- Children: 4
- Parents: Sir William Ingram (father); Mary Eliza Collingwood Stirling (mother)
- Relatives: Herbert Ingram (paternal grandfather); Edward Stirling (maternal grandfather); Bruce Ingram (brother); Edward Charles Stirling (uncle); Lancelot Stirling (uncle)
- Military career
- Allegiance: United Kingdom
- Branch: British Army; Royal Air Force
- Service years: 1914–1945
- Units: Kent Cyclist Battalion; Royal Flying Corps; Royal Air Force; Home Guard
- Conflicts: World War I World War II

Collingwood "Cherry" Ingram (30 October 1880 – 19 May 1981), was a British ornithologist, plant collector and gardener, who was an authority on Japanese flowering cherries.

== Personal life ==
Collingwood Ingram was a son of Sir William Ingram and Mary Eliza Collingwood née Stirling, daughter of Australian politician Edward Stirling.

He was a grandson of Herbert Ingram, founder of The Illustrated London News. Sir William Ingram succeeded Herbert as the owner of the paper, and was a brother of Bruce Ingram, editor from 1900–1963. Collingwood's uncle, Sir Edward Charles Stirling, was a noted anthropologist, physiologist and museum director, with a great interest in the natural world.

On 17 October 1906, Collingwood married Florence Maude Laing, only child of Henry Rudolph Laing, they had four children.

In the First World War, he was first commissioned in the Kent Cyclist Battalion and was later a compass officer with the Royal Flying Corps and Royal Air Force. In the Second World War, he was commander of his local Home Guard in Benenden, Kent.

He was a collector of Japanese art, especially netsuke, and left his collection to the British Museum.

== Ornithology ==
In the early 1900s, Sir William Ingram employed Wilfred Stalker to collect bird skins in Australia for Collingwood to identify and catalogue at the London Natural History Museum, resulting in his first major publication. In 1907 he collected in Japan and for his work there he was made an Honorary Member of the Ornithological Society of Japan. However his main interest was in the field study of birds; he made the first record of marsh warblers breeding in Kent. He was an accomplished bird artist. His planned book on the birds of France was interrupted by the War and never completed, although part emerged as Birds of the Riviera in 1926. His 1916–18 journals record his war experiences and also his off-duty bird observations, with many sketches made behind the lines in northern France. His published war diaries are packed with his pencil sketches of birds, people and landscapes. He interrogated pilots, including Charles Portal, on the height at which birds fly, resulting in a short paper after the War. He was member of the British Ornithologists' Union for a record 81 years.

== Plant collecting and gardening ==
After the First World War, horticulture took over from ornithology as Collingwood Ingram's dominant interest. He created his famous garden at The Grange in Benenden and collected plants across the world. His outstanding plant-collecting trips were to Japan in 1926 and South Africa in 1927.

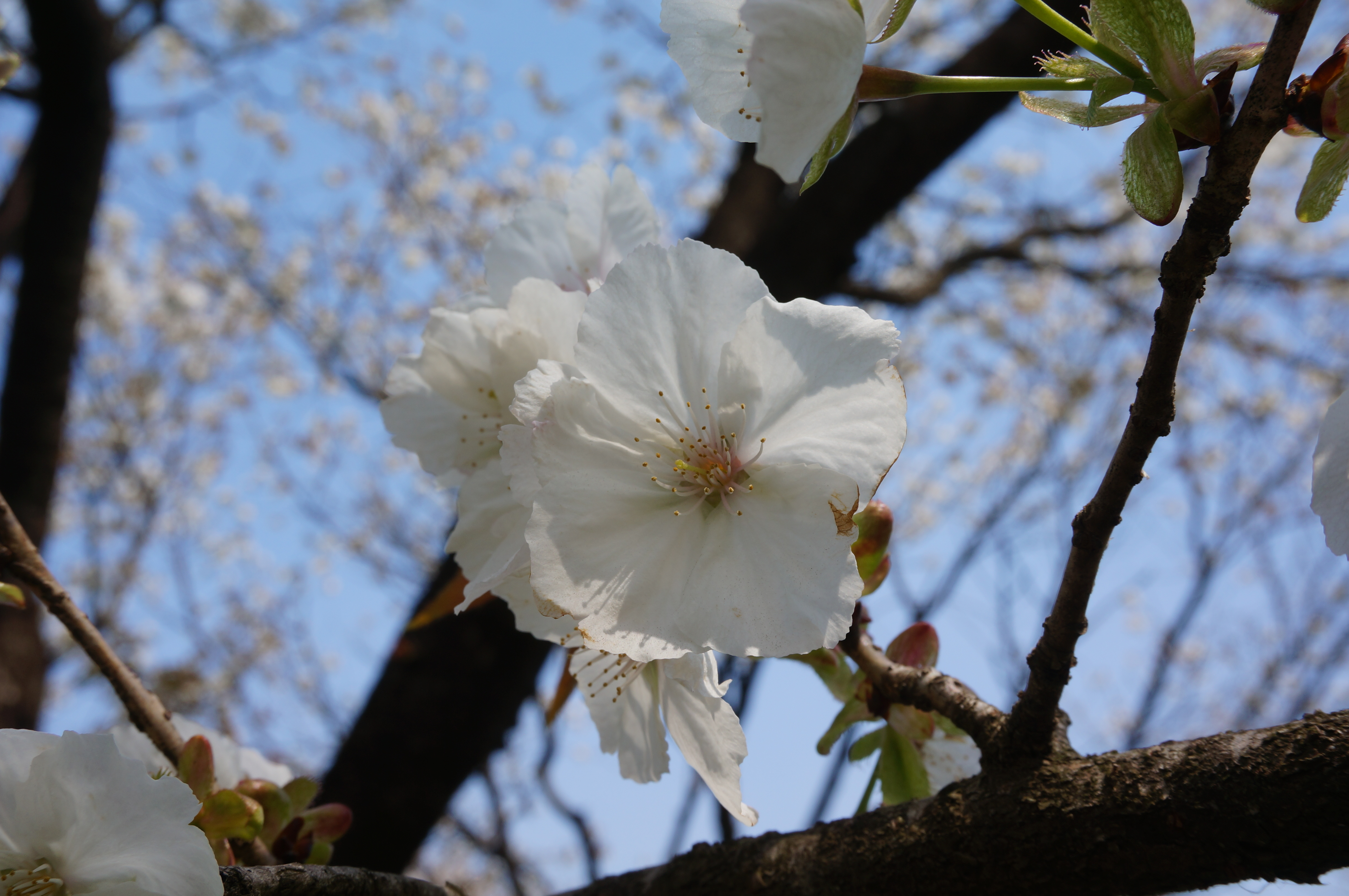
A flower of a Taihaku tree at the Flower Association of Japan's Yūki Farm, Yūki, Ibaraki

By 1926, he was a world authority on Japanese cherries and was asked to address the Cherry Society in Japan on their national tree. It was on this visit that he was shown a painting of a beautiful white cherry, then thought to be extinct in Japan. He recognised it as one he had seen in a moribund state in a Sussex garden, the result of an early introduction from Japan. He had taken cuttings and so was able to re-introduce it to the gardening world as ‘Taihaku’, the name meaning 'Great White Cherry'. His 1948 book Ornamental Cherries is a standard work.

In March 2016, a book on his contribution to the survival of Japanese cherries was published in Japan. The author is Naoko Abe, the publisher Iwanami Shoten. An English version with the title Cherry Ingram: the Englishman who saved Japan's Blossoms was published in March 2019, together with the American version The Sakura Obsession. This book recounts the important, almost central, role of cherries in the history and culture of Japan, and describes Ingram's contribution. He introduced many Japanese and other species of cherries to the United Kingdom, as well as his own hybrids.

Ingram introduced many new garden plants, including Prunus × incam ‘Okamé’ (Prunus incisa × Prunus campanulata), Rubus × tridel ‘Benenden’ (Rubus deliciosus × Rubus trilobus) and the Rosemary ‘Benenden Blue’, a natural variant of Rosmarinus officinalis which he collected in Corsica. He also raised many Rhododendron and Cistus hybrids. An avenue of his 'Asano' cherry is one of the features of Kew Gardens.

As one of many generous acts, he gave a cherry plant to each of the Walkhurst cottages on Walkhurst Road, Benenden. One of the resulting cherry trees still stands along this road.

== Bibliography ==
=== Books by Ingram ===
- Birds of the Riviera. 1926. Witherby, London.
- Isles of the Seven Seas. 1936. Hutchinson, London.
- Ornamental Cherries. 1948. Country Life, London.
- In search of Birds. 1966. Witherby, London.
- Garden of Memories. 1970. Witherby, London.
- The Migration of the Swallow, 1974. Witherby, London.
- Wings over the Western Front: the First World War Diaries of Collingwood Ingram, June 2014, Day Books, Oxfordshire.

=== Biographies ===
- Cherry Ingram: The Englishman who saved Japan's Blossoms, author Naoko Abe, 21 March 2019, Chatto and Windus, London.
