= Edward Stirling (politician) =

Australian politician

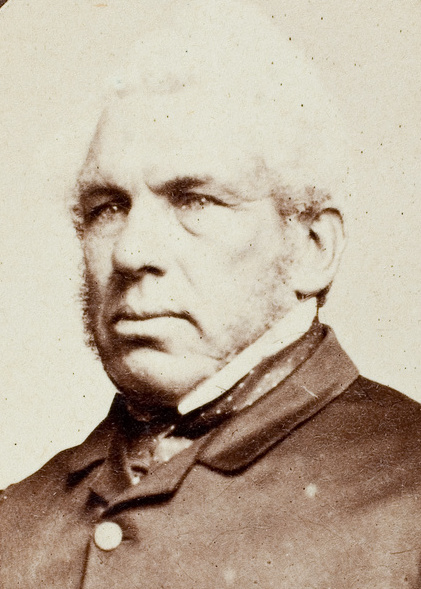
- Stirling c. 1863

Member of the South Australian Legislative Council
- In office 25 October 1855 – 28 February 1865

Personal details
- Born: c. 1808 Jamaica
- Died: 2 February 1873 (aged 64–65) London, England
- Spouse: Harriett Taylor (m. 1847)
- Children: Edward Charles Stirling (son); John Lancelot Stirling (son)
- Relatives: William Stirling-Maxwell (half-brother); Bruce Ingram (grandson); Collingwood Ingram (grandson); Harriet Stirling (granddaughter)
- Occupation: politician and businessman

Edward Stirling (c. 1808 – 2 February 1873) was an early settler of South Australia. He established several pastoral properties and was a co-founder of what became Elders Limited, also serving two terms in the South Australian Legislative Council.

Stirling was born in Jamaica, the illegitimate child of a Scottish planter and a Jamaican woman of colour; his mixed-race ancestry was not public knowledge. He was raised in Scotland and immigrated to South Australia in 1839, financed by his father's slave compensation. Stirling established a sheep run near Strathalbyn with his cousin, later added several other properties. He later moved to Adelaide and entered into a partnership with Thomas Elder and Robert Barr Smith, which became Elders Limited. He was a member of the Legislative Council from 1855 to 1865 and served on the board of the South Australian Banking Company, later representing the bank in London where he died. His sons Edward Charles and John Lancelot Stirling were also members of parliament.

== Early life ==
Stirling was born in Jamaica in about 1808. He was the illegitimate son of Archibald Stirling, a member of the Stirling slaveholding family of Keir House in Perthshire, Scotland. The family had acquired Jamaican property in 1733. Archibald lived in Jamaica for 25 years, primarily on his Hampden plantation in Trelawny Parish, bordering Saint James Parish, and fathered at least six illegitimate children with women of colour, who may have been enslaved people or free people of colour. The identity of Stirling's mother is uncertain, but he was visibly of African descent. After moving to South Australia he identified solely as Scottish, but his mixed-race origin was passed down through oral history accounts which suggest his mother was a Creole woman named Jeanne or Jeannie. Genealogical testing of Stirling's descendants in the 21st century indicates that his mother was the daughter of a woman from present-day Ghana.

In 1815, Stirling's father returned to Scotland and married Elizabeth Maxwell, the daughter of Sir John Maxwell, 7th Baronet. Their son Sir William Stirling-Maxwell, 9th Baronet, was a member of parliament in the United Kingdom. Being of mixed race, Stirling and his siblings were barred from admission to the best schools in Jamaica and had few employment prospects. When he was about eight years old, he was sent to Scotland to be educated, along with a brother and two male cousins. He attended the parochial school at St Vigeans, living with the schoolmaster John Bowman. He finished school at about the age of 17 or 18 and was then employed as a clerk in Glasgow by the merchant firm of Alexander and John Dennistoun, associates of his father.

Stirling's father inherited the family estates in 1831. Between 1835 and 1838 he received over £12,500 (equivalent to £1,200,000 in 2025) in compensation under the Slave Compensation Act 1837 for the loss of 690 slaves in Jamaica. In 1839, Stirling received an accelerated inheritance of £1,000 (equivalent to £90,000 in 2025) to allow him to immigrate to the new British colony of South Australia. His cousin Charles accompanied him, while their respective brothers remained in Scotland and received annuities in Stirling's father's will.

== South Australia ==
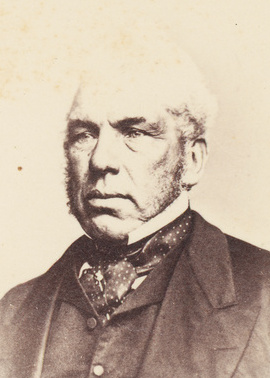
Stirling c. 1863

Stirling and his cousin Charles arrived in South Australia in June 1839 aboard Lady Bute. They subsequently built a house on Hutt Street, Adelaide. The pair later secured land grants near Strathalbyn, South Australia, by financing a special survey of the land around River Angas. By 1845 they were grazing sheep at Strathalbyn on a property named Hampden, after one of his father's Jamaican plantations. In that year they moved 3,000 sheep south-east to Rivoli Bay, a distance of 180 miles (290 km), but two-thirds of the flock died of coast disease within a few months and the cousins suffered financially. Stirling's father grudgingly paid debts of £1,000 (equivalent to £100,000 in 2025), writing that "you had not expect another bean from me".

Stirling was appointed a justice of the peace in 1846 and in 1849 was made a district commissioner (government representative) for Macclesfield. He became "a mature man of means and apparently accepted as such in Adelaide's relatively egalitarian society". In 1853, Stirling and his cousin further expanded Hampden to its largest size of 1,129 acres (457 ha) and established another property, Highland Valley, nearby. His cousin returned to England to marry and died a few years later. A pastoral outstation was established at Nalpa on the shore of Lake Alexandrina in 1857.

In 1855, Stirling moved his family to Urrbrae, just outside of Adelaide, and established himself as a wool broker and produce merchant. The following year he entered into a partnership with Thomas Elder and Robert Barr Smith. Their firm of Elder, Stirling & Co. eventually evolved into Elders Limited, and made a reputed fortune financing the first copper mines at Wallaroo and Moonta.

Stirling was director of the South Australian Banking Company from April 1859 to the end of 1864. In 1860 he took over land near Whyalla (SA) now known as Point Lowly from James Chambers and "while he was in occupation he liberated a few pairs of rabbits to breed for sporting purposes. They increased very rapidly, and when he transferred the run to A. D. Tassie [Alexander Drysdale Tassie (1832 -1873), the first British settler of Port Augusta] in 1864 there were great numbers of them there." Like Thomas Austin's release at Barwon Park at about the same time, this comprises a significant early successful rabbit release in Australia. In 1865 he and Harriett, with their two sons John and Archibald and three daughters, returned to England, where Edward joined the London Court of Directors, of which he was chairman at the time of his death.

== Politics ==
In September 1855 he contested the seat of Hindmarsh, without success, but was almost immediately appointed as nominated member to the 1855 Legislative Council, and was an elected member of the 1857 Legislative Council. His term ended on 28 February 1865. While parliament was in session the family lived at Urrbrae, which he rented from Alexander MacGeorge.

== Other interests ==
He was a patron of the Strathalbyn Presbyterian Church, and around 1860, before leaving the Colony for England presented that church with a bell-tower.

He and his brother-in-law John Taylor were friends of Catherine Helen Spence.

== Final years ==
In 1864, Stirling moved his family to England for his sons' education, joining the South Australian Banking Company's court of directors in London. He died at his home on Queen's Gardens near Hyde Park on 2 February 1873. His pastoral holdings remained in the family, while his shares in the Moonta Mining Company were sold for an estimated £50,000 (equivalent to £5,040,000 in 2025), reported by the South Australian Register to be "the largest single transaction yet reported in our share market".

== Family ==
He married Harriett Taylor on 4 August 1847. Among their children were:

- Sir Edward Charles Stirling (8 September 1848 – 20 March 1919) noted Australian scientist.
- Sir (John) Lancelot Stirling (5 November 1849 – 24 May 1932) MLA for Mount Barker 1881–87 for Gumeracha 1888–90, and MLC for Southern District 1891–1932. He married Florence Marion Milne (daughter of William Milne) on 12 December 1882.
- Mary Eliza Collingwood Stirling (d. 8 October 1925) married Sir William Ingram, 1st Baronet on 10 November 1874.

== Recognition ==
- The Adelaide Hills township of Stirling was in 1854 named by its developer, Peter Dowding Prankerd (c. 1819 – January 1903), for his friend Edward Stirling.
- The Mid-North town of Stirling North was at the time of its survey in 1859 named for him.
