= Joseph Stanislaus Ostoja-Kotkowski =

Joseph Stanislaus Ostoja-Kotkowski AM, FRSA
- Born: December 28, 1922; Golub
- Died: April 2, 1994 (aged 71); Stirling, South Australia
- Education: Düsseldorf Academy of Fine Arts; National Gallery School (Melbourne)
- Known for: Chromasonics, laser kinetics, painting, photography, computer graphics
- Style: Geometric art, abstract expressionism, op art
- Awards: Cornell Prize; Excellence F.I.A.P. Award (1967)

Joseph Stanislaus Ostoja-Kotkowski AM, FRSA (also known as J. S. Ostoja-Kotkowski, Ostoja and Stan Ostoja-Kotkowski; 28 December 1922 – 2 April 1994) was best known for his ground-breaking work in chromasonics, laser kinetics and 'sound and image' productions. He earned recognition in Australia and overseas for his pioneering work in laser sound and image technology. His work included painting (instrumental in developing geometric art in Australia), photography, film-making, theatre design, fabric design, murals, kinetic and static sculpture, stained glass, vitreous enamel murals, op-collages, computer graphics, and laser art. Ostoja flourished between 1940 and 1994.

Ostoja's films are still being exhibited.

== Biography ==
Joseph Stanislaus Ostoja-Kotkowski was born in Golub, Poland, on 28 December 1922, descending from an old noble family that was part of the Clan of Ostoja. He studied drawing under Olgierd Vetesco in Przasnysz from 1940-1945. After winning a scholarship, he completed his studies at the Düsseldorf Academy of Fine Arts in Germany in 1949.

In 1950 Ostoja migrated to Australia, arriving in Melbourne where he supported himself with work as a labourer. He enrolled at the Victorian School of Fine Arts National Gallery School under Alan Sumner and William Dargie 1950-1955 and there introduced the new abstract expression of Europe both to lecturers and students.

He settled in the Adelaide Hills, South Australia, on the Booth estate at Stirling, living under the patronage of the Booth family for over 40 years (Freya Booth, the wife of Edward Stirling Booth, was a daughter of the artist Sir Hans Heysen). His first one-man exhibition was also in South Australia at the Royal Society of Arts, Adelaide.

In 1956 Ostoja met and collaborated with Ian Davidson in the production of the short film Five South Australian Artists, and became involved in stage and theatre set design.

He co-produced several experimental films again with Ian Davidson, including The Quest of Time in 1957

Ostoja's work in abstract expression began to receive accolades. He won the Cornell Prize for the canvas Form in Landscape.

He started to design sets for theatre and dance including for Six Characters in Search of an Author by Luigi Pirandello (1957); the South Australian production of Samuel Beckett's Waiting for Godot (1958); Gaetano Donizetti's Elixir of Love, with novel light settings and modulations, for the Elder Conservatorium of the University of Adelaide which used his techniques for their Opera Workshops (1959); for The Egg; and for two performances of the South Australian Ballet Theatre with light/colour abstract presentations (1959).

1960

This year he designed sets for a new opera group which would eventually grow into the South Australian Opera Company. Among other theatrical events, he designed and executed the scenery for Moon on a Rainbow Shawl by Errol John, and The Teahouse of the August Moon by John Patrick, (a production by the University of Adelaide Theatre Guild). He received artistic satisfaction but little financial reward for these efforts. In this year also, he staged a visual production on the theme of Orpheus, using dance, music and voice with several projectors.

This was the first attempt at quadraphonic sound in Australia, working in collaboration with Derek Jolly, who provided the sound and projection equipment. It was also the first demonstration of "Chromasonics" - the science of translating sound into visual images. Ostoja then designed innovative "abstracted" scenery for a production of The Marriage of Figaro and Benjamin Britten's The Turn of the Screw.

1961

Ostoja designed the sets for the controversial South Australian production of Patrick White's The Ham Funeral - also Alan Seymour's Swamp Creatures, both performed by the University of Adelaide Theatre Guild. He designed and constructed six stained glass windows for the Refectory at the University of Adelaide. In this period Ostoja designed special lights and gauzes for difficult effects required in an ambitious production of the opera Don Carlos by the Opera Workshop, for the Elder Conservatorium.

1962

Ostoja designed and built sets for the production of J.B, by Archibald MacLeish, for the second Adelaide Festival of Arts. He exhibited vitreous enamel works in Melbourne's Argus Gallery. Max Harris, in The Bulletin of 20 October 1962, praised Ostoja's sets for My Cousin from Fiji in Union Theatre, Adelaide, and his technique of rear screen projections as later adopted throughout Australia.

1963

Ostoja continued to develop Multi-Image projections, demonstrating for the first time in Australia the concept later to be known as 'audio-visuals!'. Ostoja gave Sir Herbert Read, the art critic, a personal viewing of one of his visual presentations. At Christmas, in the Elder Conservatorium, collaborating again with Derek Jolly, Ostoja gave what was probably the world's first "visual concert", using special projectors and incorporating music, colours and shapes.

1964

With fellow Adelaide artist John Dallwitz, Ostoja co-designed the first of several experimental dance and stage productions in the Adelaide Festival of Arts Sound and Image. The production featured Adelaide dancer Elizabeth_Cameron_Dalman.

Also for the Adelaide Festival of Arts of that year, he designed the largest light mosaic ever staged up to that time, upon the facade of an 11-storey building. Ostoja was invited to New Zealand, and exhibited the first electronically generated images in Australia in Melbourne, at the Argus Gallery. His design for the 50-foot (15 m) bas-relief mural for the new B.P. building in Melbourne was the subject of a film which won the "Blue Ribbon" Award in the American Film Festival in New York.

1965

Ostoja designed and made the first light kinetic mural in Australia, and continued to evolve theatrical works using multi-screen and Multi-projector techniques. The Production of Jean Genet's The Balcony was very controversial. With Elizabeth Dalman, Ostoja produced new dance forms for Melbourne Television. He introduced Op Art to Australia, both at South Yarra Gallery in Melbourne, and Gallery A in Sydney.

1966

With John Dallwitz, Ostoja was invited by the Adelaide Festival of Arts to present more experimental theatre, Sound and image 1966. This highly acclaimed production incorporated Australian poetry into the sound, electronic music, and visual images and featured the dancer Antonio Rodrigues. The architect Robin Boyd commissioned Ostoja to design two large Op murals for the Australian Pavilion entrance at the Expo 67. Ostoja was awarded a Churchill Fellowship, which enabled him to have extensive world travel, comparing art and technology in many countries. He began to work with language, contemporary poetry and prose, and computers.

1967

John Dallwitz and Ostoja presented Sound and Image at the Festival of Perth.

In Berne, Switzerland, Ostoja received the "Excellence F.I.A.P." Award for innovative photography.

1968

At the Adelaide Festival of Arts, Ostoja and John Dallwitz collaborated again to stage Sound and Image. This was the first theatre production in the world to use a laser beam. It also included the first science fiction play (The Veldt by Ray Bradbury) performed in Australia. Ostoja's theatre methods were increasingly attracting the attention of critics to how plays were staged. "Chromasonics", developed and introduced by Ostoja, was now being used extensively in the entertainment industry.

1969

Ostoja staged Krzysztof Penderecki's St. Luke Passion, a controversial, contemporary religious work. The South Australian The Advertiser wrote an extensive critique of Ostoja's work. Robin Boyd commissioned Ostoja to build a "Chromasonic" exhibit located in the Space Tube at the Australian Pavilion for Expo '70 in Osaka.

1970

Ostoja presented an Australian Aboriginal Dreamtime theme in his "Sound and Image" theatre, working with leading contemporary figures in poetry, music and dance. This was the first production of its kind in Australia, and appeared after the Festival in Melbourne, Sydney, Canberra and Perth. Ostoja's Space Scape mural, sixty feet long by ten feet high, won the Australia-wide competition for a mural for Adelaide Airport. His 120 feet (37 m) high 'light and sound' structure for the Adelaide Festival was the first of its kind in the world.

1971

Ostoja awarded a Creative Arts Fellowship at the Australian National University, Canberra. His 18-month stay resulted in the design and building of a "Chromasonics unit-laser", a 100 feet (30 m) Chromasonic tower, and a world premiere of a Synchronos concert.

1972

With Don Burrows and Don Banks, Ostoja presented Synchronos 72, where one could "hear the colours and see the sounds". Ostoja added Cymatics, developed during the Fellowship, to his workshop repertoire. He was invited to exhibit his photography in the National Gallery, Melbourne.

1973

Ostoja received a Fellowship from the Australian American Education Association to study art and technology in the U.S.A. He studied laser art and technology, using a newly developed material in his optical collages.

1974

Using several lasers, Ostoja designed sets and a special curtain for the complex work The Excursions of Mr. Brouček by Janáček, the first opera produced at the new Adelaide Festival Theatre complex.

1975

The artist's Laser - Chromasonics (1972) and Laser Chromasonic Tower Mark III exhibited for the Festival of Creative Art and Sciences, Canberra. Ostoja commissioned to design a vitreous enamel mural for the Earth Science building, University of Melbourne.

1976

Ostoja exhibited works in vitreous enamel on steel, optical collages, and for the first time in Australia, collages incorporating Kirlian photography. The Premier, Don Dunstan, opened this exhibition at Lidum's Gallery, Adelaide. Ostoja's Theremin 74, using electronics and stainless steel, purchased by the Tasmanian Art Gallery. Ostoja commissioned to produce a large bass relief mural for the new Nauru House, in Melbourne.

1977

Ostoja displayed exhibits of vitreous enamels, optical collages, and kinetics with six lasers at the Australian Galleries Exhibition in Melbourne. He was commissioned to undertake a feasibility study for a solar mural by the University of Melbourne.

1978

The artist's computer poem Tidal Element (the first computer poem composed in Australia) featured in a special issue of "Australian Literary Studies" (Adelaide University). Ostoja created a new Laser Chromasonic Tower, which produced kinetic laser images and incandescent lights, for the Royal Adelaide International Expo 78. Ostoja's experiments with an argon laser gave rise to a new organic image in his work laser images, including "Astroid" and "Harmonics".

1980

The Australian Broadcasting Corporation produced a half-hour documentary on Ostoja's work, titled 'Graphic Music' the program screening on 13 April 1980.

The Governor-General and his wife visited the artist's studio in Stirling. Christopher Hunt, Artistic Director of the 1980 Adelaide Festival of Arts, invited Ostoja to exhibit his laser kinetics in conjunction with a holographic exhibit from the New York Museum.

The show, Futuresight, in the Melville Hall, Adelaide, was opened by Sir Mark Oliphant.

The magazine Scientific Australian published an article on this exhibition in the No.4, Volume 4 Edition.

1981–1982

Ostoja prepared for an exhibition in Sydney, and became interested artistically in Australian jade. Commissioned by Dr Nina Christensen of Melbourne University to construct a jade window. At this Adelaide Festival of Arts he presented a different kind of laser concert. Art in Australia, Vol. 19, No. 3 published an extensive article on Ostoja's works, covering a twenty-year period.

1983

Barry Jones opened Ostoja's two major exhibitions at the Barry Stern Gallery, Sydney - one on optical collages, and a laser kinetics, music and sound exhibition. It is suggested that Ostoja donate his large, personal collection of photographs and a full documentation of his career, to Melbourne University's Australian Collection. The collection was subsequently deposited in the Baillieu Library.

1984

Ostoja used a vapour laser, then built by Quentron Optics in Adelaide. He presented a laser kinetics concert for the Ballarat Festival.

1985

Using computer generated images, Ostoja staged a laser concert at Wayville Showgrounds, Adelaide, to celebrate the finale of the inaugural Adelaide Grand Prix. Australia Post produced a stamp issue designed by Ostoja (using a laser), to launch the first Australian "electronic mail" system.

1986

Ostoja invited to stage a laser concert for the South Australian Jubilee 150 Celebrations. He constructed the Solaris, a continually changing, solar kinetic mural, at the CSIRO. Division of Applied Physics, Lindfield, N.S.W, and was invited to exhibit it at Expo '88 in Brisbane.

1987

Ostoja redesigned the shape of Solaris for the Brisbane Expo. For the Director of the new Scitech Discovery Centre, Perth, Ostoja designed, produced, and exhibited a work which reveals the effects of theremin and light.

1988 to 1989

Australian Bicentenary celebrations included a project sponsored by the Polish community to honour the name of Australia's highest mountain, Mount Kosciuszko. In collaboration with sculptor John Dowie, Ostoja constructed a geometrical, stainless steel monument at the entrance to the town of Cooma, New South Wales. Reading about chaos theory and Professor Mandelbrot's Beauty of Fractals, Ostoja began to work in this area. An article published in The Australian, October 1989, revealed some of Ostoja's considerable output of work in the field of computer graphics in this new field.

1991-1993

Ostoja was invited by the National Philharmonic in Warsaw, Poland, Ostoja staged SYNKRONOS 91 concert - workshop using 13 blue green and red lasers and incandescent lamps to translate works of traditional and contemporary composers into kinetic laser images and shapes.

1994

Ostoja was involved in part of the 1994 Adelaide Festival's Technilusions. He displayed some of his Fractals and Mandelbrots and was displayed with "current" and "state of the art" technologies Animation, Virtual Reality and CD-ROM.

He died at home on 2 April 1994 of heart failure, in the cottage Arbroath on the Booth estate at Stirling South Australia, where he had lived under the patronage of the Booth family for over 40 years. His studio was on the same property.

== Collections ==
Ostoja's work is held in the following collections:

- Art Gallery of New South Wales (Nymphex, Sonix, and Sunrise.)
- Art Gallery of South Australia (32 works including sculpture, drawing, photograph, painting)
- National Gallery of Victoria (Crimson, Enclosed spheres, Pavo, and The planet.)
- Newmarch Gallery (Untitled),
- Powerhouse Museum (Untitled, Untitled, Untitled, Untitled, Untitled, The Monument, Untitled,
- Reserve Bank of Australia (Form in landscape)
- RMIT Design Archives (Untitled)

== Exhibitions and performances ==
- 2019: 'Josef Stanislaw Ostoja-Kotkowski: Solid Light', McClelland Sculpture Park+Gallery, April 1 – July 14

== Publications ==
- Ostoja-Kotkowski, S. (1975). Audio-kinetic art with laser beams and electronic systems. Leonardo, 8(2), 142-144.
- Ostoja-Kotkowski, J. S. (1977). Audio-Kinetic Art: The Construction and Operation of My'Laser-Chromasonic Tower. In Leonardo, 10(1), 51-53.

== Publications about Ostoja-Kotkowski ==
- Davidson, I (1999). Art, theatre and photography : remembering Stan Ostoja-Kotkowski (1922-1994) in Adelaide, South Australia, 1954-1972.
- Hackett, E. (1966). Electronic Painting: The'Images' of Ostoja-Kotkowski. In Meanjin Quarterly, 25(4), 494.
- Gadomska, A., & Gadomski, K. (2005). 'Józef Stanisław Ostoja-Kotkowski–prekursor sztuki laserowej w świecie.' In Zarządzanie w Kulturze, 6, 267-270.
- Krawczyk, A. (2005). 'Światło Świątyni Sybilli. Rzecz o muzeach dawniej, dzisiaj iw przyszłości'. In Zarządzanie w kulturze, 6, 177-180.
- Olek, J. (2017). 'Reprezentacja zawarta w odbiciu'. Dziennikarstwo i Media, 8, 17-28.

== Awards ==
- 1957, 1959: Cornell Prize Exhibition of the Contemporary Arts Society of South Australia
- 1972: Fellow of the Royal Society of Arts
- 1990: Medal of Merit for Polish Culture
- 1992: Member of the Order of Australia (AM).

== See also ==
- Ostoja coat of arms
- Clan of Ostoja
