= James Garden Ramsay =

Australian politician

The Honourable James Garden Ramsay
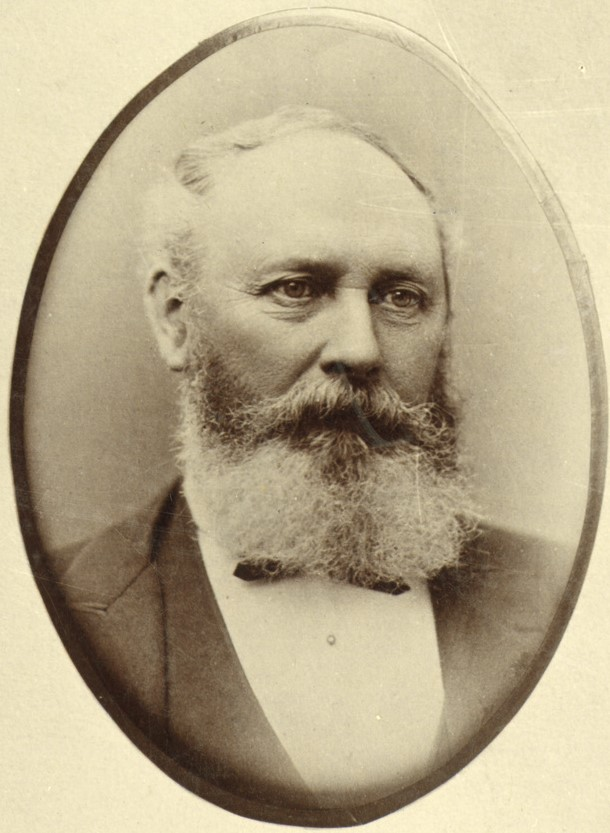
- Born: 1827; Edinburgh, Scotland
- Died: 17 January 1890 (aged 62–63)
- Children: Robert Garden Ramsay

James Garden Ramsay (1827 – 17 January 1890) was an industrialist and politician in colonial South Australia.

== Biography ==
=== Personal life ===
Ramsay was born in Edinburgh, Scotland, and served his apprenticeship as an engineer at the St Rollox Ironworks in Glasgow, and came to South Australia in 1857, establishing four years later at Mount Barker an agricultural implement and machine manufactory, which grew into the largest business of its kind in the colony. The farm machinery manufacturer John Shearer got his start as an apprentice to Ramsay.

=== Career ===
Ramsay represented Mount Barker in the South Australian Legislative Assembly from 5 April 1870 (along with John Cheriton), and on 7 July 1880 was elected to the South Australian Legislative Council, for which he sat until of his death. Ramsay was Commissioner of Public Works in the Henry Ayers Ministry from January to March 1872 and in the two John Cox Bray governments from June 1881 to June 1884. Ramsay was Chief Secretary under John Cox Bray from 23 April 1884 to 16 June 1884; and under Thomas Playford from 11 June 1887 to 27 June 1889.

In 1886 Ramsay received the Queen's permission to bear the style of The Honourable within the colony.

On 20 January 1890, Ramsay died from injuries sustained when an oil lamp in a railway carriage in which he was travelling burst, showering him with burning kerosene.

== Family ==
James Garden Ramsay married Mary Elliot Robertson ( – 4 May 1876) in 1854. He married again, to Bertha Ellen Horwood (20 December 1854 – 22 November 1942) on 6 December 1883. Bertha was a daughter of Bendigo (originally Adelaide) industrialist Joel Horwood, jnr, (1832–1900).

His son Robert Garden Ramsay was a member of the Elder Scientific Exploring Expedition of 1891-1892.

Parliament of South Australia
Previous: William Rogers	Member of Parliament for Mount Barker; 1870–1875; Served alongside: John Cheriton, William West-Erskine	Succeeded by Albert Landseer
Previous: William West-Erskine	Member of Parliament for Mount Barker; 1876–1878; Served alongside: Albert Landseer	Succeeded by Francis Stokes
Political offices
Preceded by John Carr	Commissioner of Public Works; 1872	Succeeded by Wentworth Cavenagh
Preceded by George Hawker	Commissioner of Public Works; 1881–1884	Succeeded by David Bower
Previous: John Bray	Chief Secretary of South Australia; 1884	Succeeded by John Colton
Previous: David Murray	Chief Secretary of South Australia; 1887–1889	Succeeded by John Cockburn
