= Albert Henry Landseer =

Australian politician

Albert Henry Landseer (10 February 1829 – 27 August 1906) was a businessman and politician in the early days of the colony of South Australia. He was a pioneer of the River Murray steamboat trade.

Albert Landseer was born in London in 1829 the only son of Henry Landseer and his wife Lucy. He was a cousin of the noted animal painter Sir Edwin Landseer, who sculpted London's famed Trafalgar Square lions. He studied sculpture under a Mr Johnson, but abandoned art and migrated to South Australia in 1848.

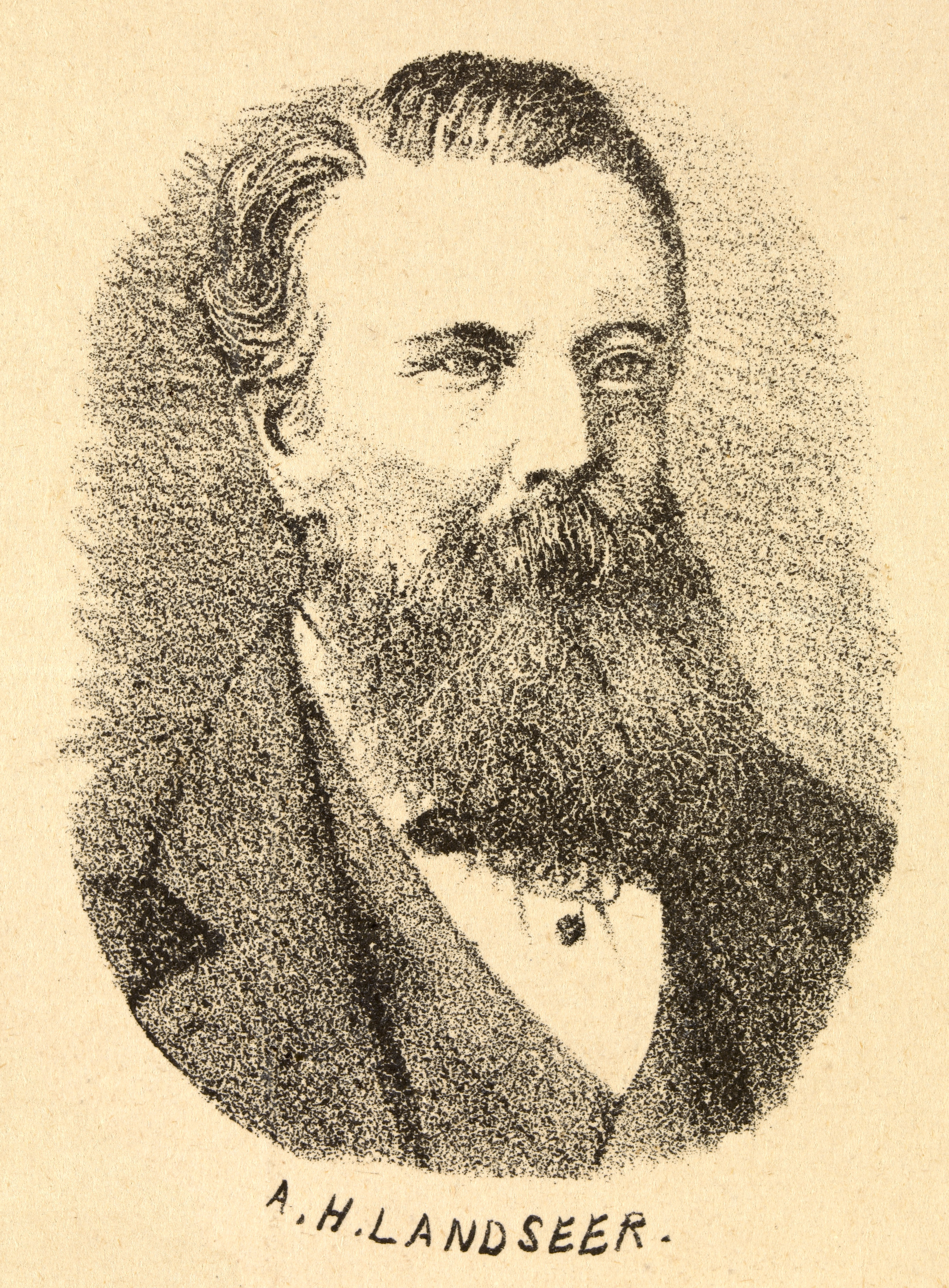
Albert Landseer as a Member of the South Australian Parliament in 1881

== Business ventures ==
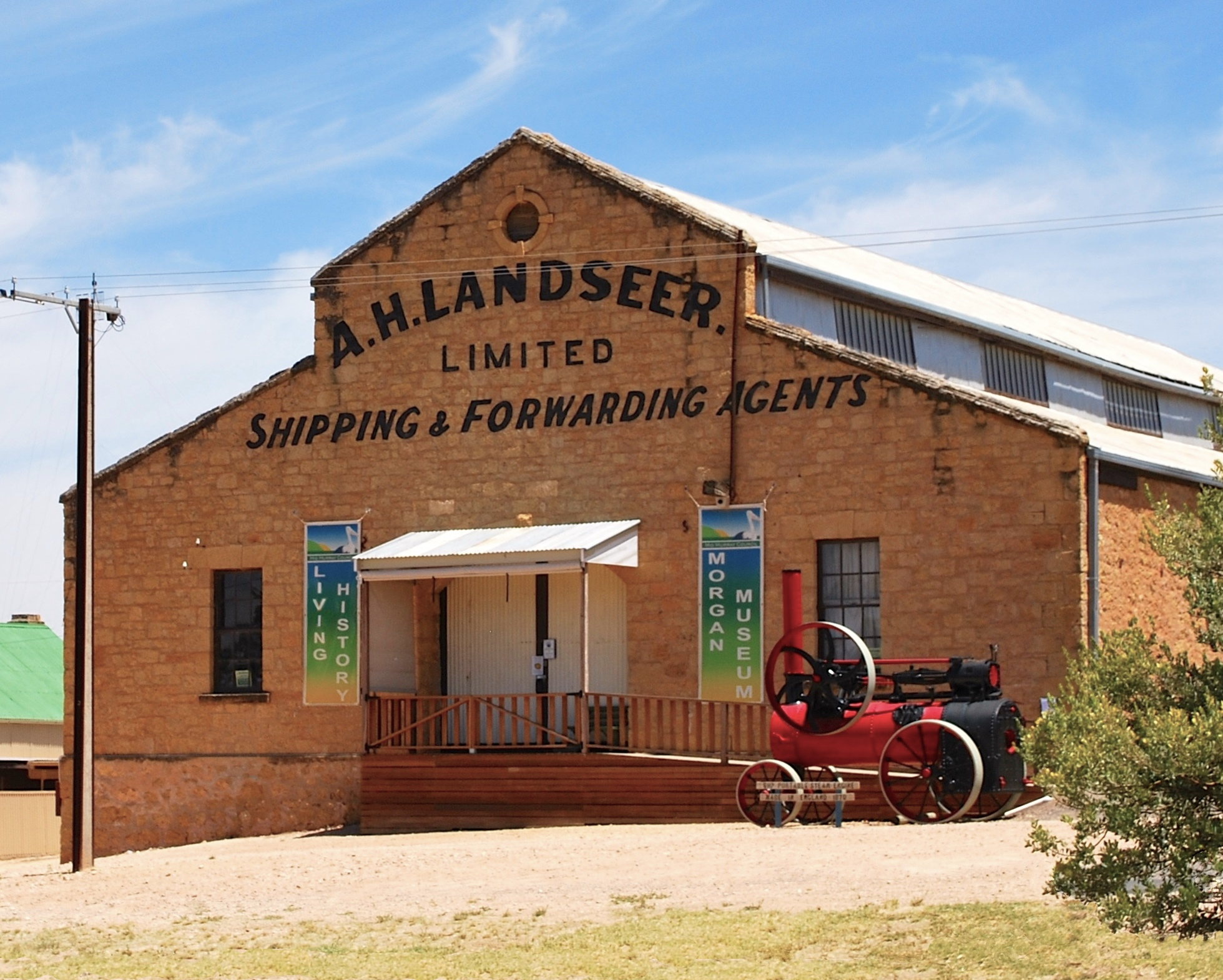
A.H. Landseer Limited warehouse at Morgan, now the Morgan Museum – one of several buildings built by Albert Landseer along the River Murray

Landseer started a business as a small building contractor for a time before joining the gold rush to Forest Creek, Victoria, about 1850; he was successful there and subsequently on occasional journeys to other goldfields. In 1858 his attention turned to the steamboat trade, then in its infancy, and started a mercantile business, initially in Port Elliot, with his brother-in-law J. P. Tripp. He acted as an agent for Captain Francis Cadell's River Murray Navigation Company and built up his company through wider ventures based on the river. Its headquarters were in Milang, which he had founded in 1856, and woolsheds and offices were in Goolwa, Morgan, and the sea port of Port Victor from where wool was shipped to Europe. He also had extensive interests in flourmills in Milang and elsewhere on Lake Alexandrina, and he owned barges and river steamers, including Bourke, Dispatch, Eliza, Gertrude and Industry.

== Parliamentary career ==
Landseer was elected in 1875 to the South Australian House of Assembly as the senior representative in the multi-member electoral district of Mount Barker. (Note: As senior MP for the District he was partnered with W. A. E. West Erskine, who was succeeded in May 1876, by J. G. Ramsay. Other partners were successively F. W. Stokes, Sir Lancelot Stirling, MLC, Dr (later Sir) John Cockburn and C. M. R. Dumas.)

In 1880 he was appointed to a parliamentary select committee to investigate the building of a railway line to connect Strathalbyn – hence the whole agricultural district – to the Adelaide–Melbourne inter-colonial railway line then under construction. He made sure the committee heard evidence supporting a branch line to Milang in addition to the main connecting line, and in November 1881 the enabling Act authorised both. By then, however, Morgan, with its direct rail link to Adelaide, held primacy over the downstream ports. Moreover, the river trade was on the eve of decline.

He retired from parliament in 1898 after 23 years' continuous membership, a record at the time. In an obituary, he was described as:

always fearless in his advocacy of what he considered just, and equally courageous in opposing anything of which he could not approve. Mr Landseer was a picturesque figure. His snowy white hair and beard, his pink and white complexion, and a pleasant, dignified manner lent fitting presence to his position as Father of the House. As he grew eloquent his flowing, winding, and almost interminable sentences would remind one of his beloved Murray River — swift and serviceable, but not deep.

Landseer was probably too inflexible on matters of principle to succeed in government: his private correspondence reveals distaste for the sharp practices of politics and a refusal to countenance underhand activity on his behalf. His support for Charles Kingston's ministry of 1893-99 was tempered by doubts about the premier's personal integrity. Barely veiled contempt for the land-owning gentry of Strathalbyn and Mount Barker almost certainly cost his business dearly.

After Landseer's resignation from parliament in 1899, his health was undermined by rheumatism and, later, heart disease; and his fortune by the decline of the river trade and reckless speculation in the Western Australian gold boom. He died on 27 August 1906 and is buried in Milang cemetery. His estate was sworn for probate in Victoria and South Australia at £15,716 (about $2.3 million in 2018). (Note: Based on the Australian Retail Price Index.)

== Personal ==
Landseer married twice: to Rosina Masson (ca.1830 – 29 April 1871) on 4 November 1856, and Harriet Sarah Taylor (ca.1852 – 15 September 1928) on 15 August 1872. Their children included:

- Florence Ada (5 November 1857 – 23 July 1891) married William John Colville on 13 April 1883
- Laura (2 March 1859 – 23 January 1895) married Edward Robert Fitzgerald on 1 June 1881 Their son Laurie Henry died in France during World War I.
- Blanch Rose (19 June 1862 – 6 February 1930) married J. W. Colville on 11 May 1893
- Ada Maria Louisa (22 January 1865 – 4 February 1871)
- Maud Isabelle (19 October 1866 – 9 April 1867)
- son (12 August 1868 – ) (Note: (Possibly Charles J. Landseer, sheep grazier, who married Ida Lankos on 30 March 1921 and lived at "Narilla", Milang.))
- Horace Henry Julian (2 June 1873 – 11 December 1945) attorney
- Elsie Florence (14 June 1875 – 4 September 1935) married Arthur Formby of Langhorne Creek on 5 September 1899. Their son Dr. Myles Landseer Formby was S.A.'s Rhodes Scholar of 1924.
- Laurence Harcourt (19 September 1876 – 27 August 1955) married Eva Matilda White (ca.1876 – 30 September 1945) on 3 November 1906
- Nellie Theresa (21 February 1878 – ) married Lewis Smith Richardson on 2 April 1907
- Hilda Mildmay (1 June 1882 – ) married Ronald Henry Martin (7 September 1880 – 27 March 1950) of Stonyfell on 20 February 1912. Ronald was killed in a car crash near Bordertown. Daughters Ruth Landseer Martin (married Alan Cowling in 1938) and Katherine Landseer Martin (married Dr. John Gardner McGlashan ca.1943).

His home was "Mirandahville", Milang.
