= Mary Anstie Overbury =

Australian artist and teacher

Mary Anstie Overbury (c. 1851 – 27 March 1926), sometimes referred to as Mary Anne Overbury, was an artist and teacher of art in South Australia.

== History ==
Overbury was born in Chipping Norton, Oxfordshire, a daughter of Thomas Overbury, manager of the Bliss Tweed Mill in that town. Her mother, Septima Overbury, née Bliss (c. 1818 – 25 August 1880), was a daughter of William Bliss, owner of the business. Thomas and Septima, with their two children Mary and Margaret, sailed for South Australia aboard the steamer Bosphorus arriving in Adelaide in June 1855 and settled at Thomas street, Unley, their home for many years.

Mary's mother had some artistic ability and Mary appears to have inherited her mother's love and aptitude for art, and was one of the early students of the School of Arts and Crafts founded by Charles Hill in 1861 and from 1882 run by H. P. Gill. She was member, later a fellow, of the S.A. Society of Arts (Inc.).

Between 1880 and 1890 she received several awards from entries submitted to the Royal College of Art at South Kensington as modules towards a Master of Arts Certificate. After Gill's death Overbury established her own school at Hawthorn. She taught privately in the 1890s and at Tormore and other schools in the early 1900s.

Overbury died age 71 after falling down stairs leading to the cellar of her home, Prescott Terrace, Rose Park, where she lived with her sister Margaret (died 1932), a school teacher who never married. Margaret Overbury was for six years a mistress at the school conducted by the Misses Kay (daughters of Robert Kay) at Trinity street, St Peters.

== Works ==
- In March 1926 her design was accepted as the official seal of the City of Unley.

She was co-author (with H. E. Fuller, and edited by Sir William Sowden) of A History of the S.A. Society of Arts Inc. 1856–1931

== Students ==
Among her students were:

- Sir George Le Hunte, and his daughter Editha Rachel Le Hunte
- Harriet Stirling, daughter of E. C. Stirling and a noted philanthropist
