= Edward Booth =

Edward Booth may refer to:

- Eddie Booth, American Major League Baseball player
- Edward Booth (naturalist), founder of the Booth Museum of Natural History
- Edward Barlow (priest) (1639–1719), also known as Edward Booth
- Edward Stirling Booth (1911–1997), South Australian botanist
