= Robert Kay (librarian) =

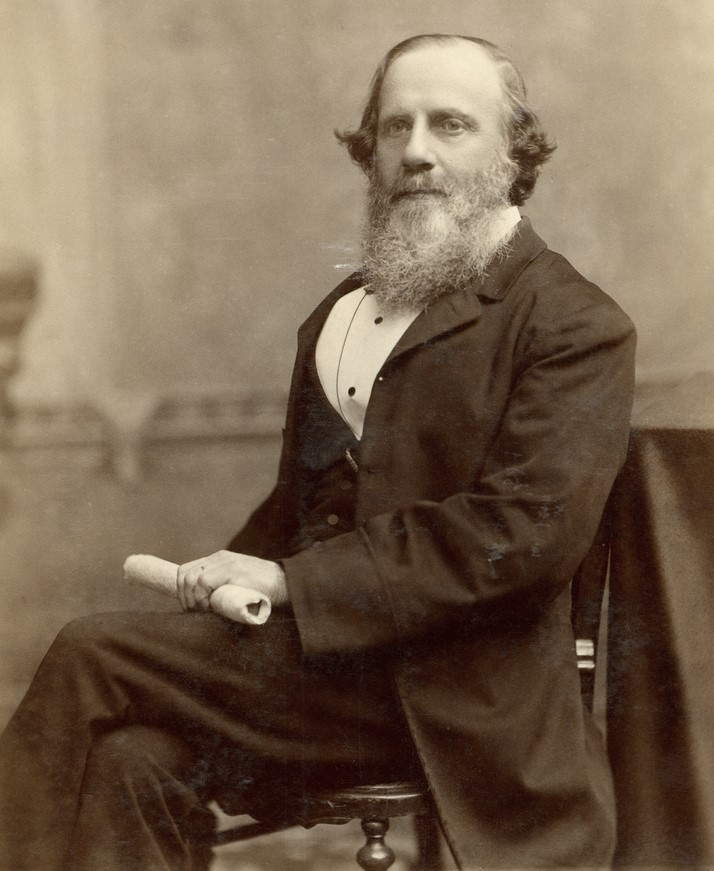

Robert Kay (19 June 1825 – 24 April 1904) was one of the founders of the Library, Art Gallery and Museum in Adelaide, South Australia, and the originator of the circulating library. At his death he was general director and secretary of the Public Library, Museum, and Art Gallery of South Australia.

== History ==
Robert Kay was born in Newcastle on Tyne and educated at the Grammar School in that town, then went to work as accountant at the iron works of which his father was manager and part owner. At the age of 24 he inherited his father's share of the business, which he sold and left for Australia on the Ascendant, arriving in South Australia in January 1851. He worked for a time as gold assayer before trying his luck on the gold fields of Mount Alexander, but soon returned to the Assay Office, where he was employed making gold tokens which at that time were used as currency. In 1853 he married and took up a farm in Woodside, and was soon elected to the Onkaparinga district council and served for a time as chairman. Three years later he returned to the city, where he was employed as accountant and cashier for the firm of Herford and Boucaut, living at Norwood. They later lived at Trinity Street, College Town.

On 1 June 1859 he has appointed secretary to the Board of Governors of the South Australian Institute (which then consisted of (later Sir) Samuel Davenport, the Rev. Dean Farrell, John Howard Clark and (later the Hon.) Lavington Glyde). With 200 books he instituted what became the Adelaide Circulating Library, exchanging boxes of books with the various Institutes in the suburbs and districts further out. This system was soon adopted by the other States of Australia and overseas.

In 1860 the Library was housed in the Institute Buildings, North-terrace, and under Kay's direction the first of the present Library Buildings were opened in 1884. (In 1873 the foundations of the western wing of a proposed new block were laid, but there the matter ended until 1876, when fresh plans were drawn, and another set of foundations put in. Again the work went no further until 1879 when the west wing was finally commenced. The earlier work was condemned, and had to be removed before the Public Library could be started.) The Museum followed in 1895, and the art collection, which was housed in the Jubilee Exhibition Building, finally had its own premises around 1900. Kay was still director when he died.

== Other interests ==
Kay was a member of the Unitarian Church, Wakefield Street, and when younger was involved in the South Australian Militia.

He was a capable musician, and until deafness set in was a violinist with the Philharmonic Society Orchestra and sang in the church choir.

== Family ==
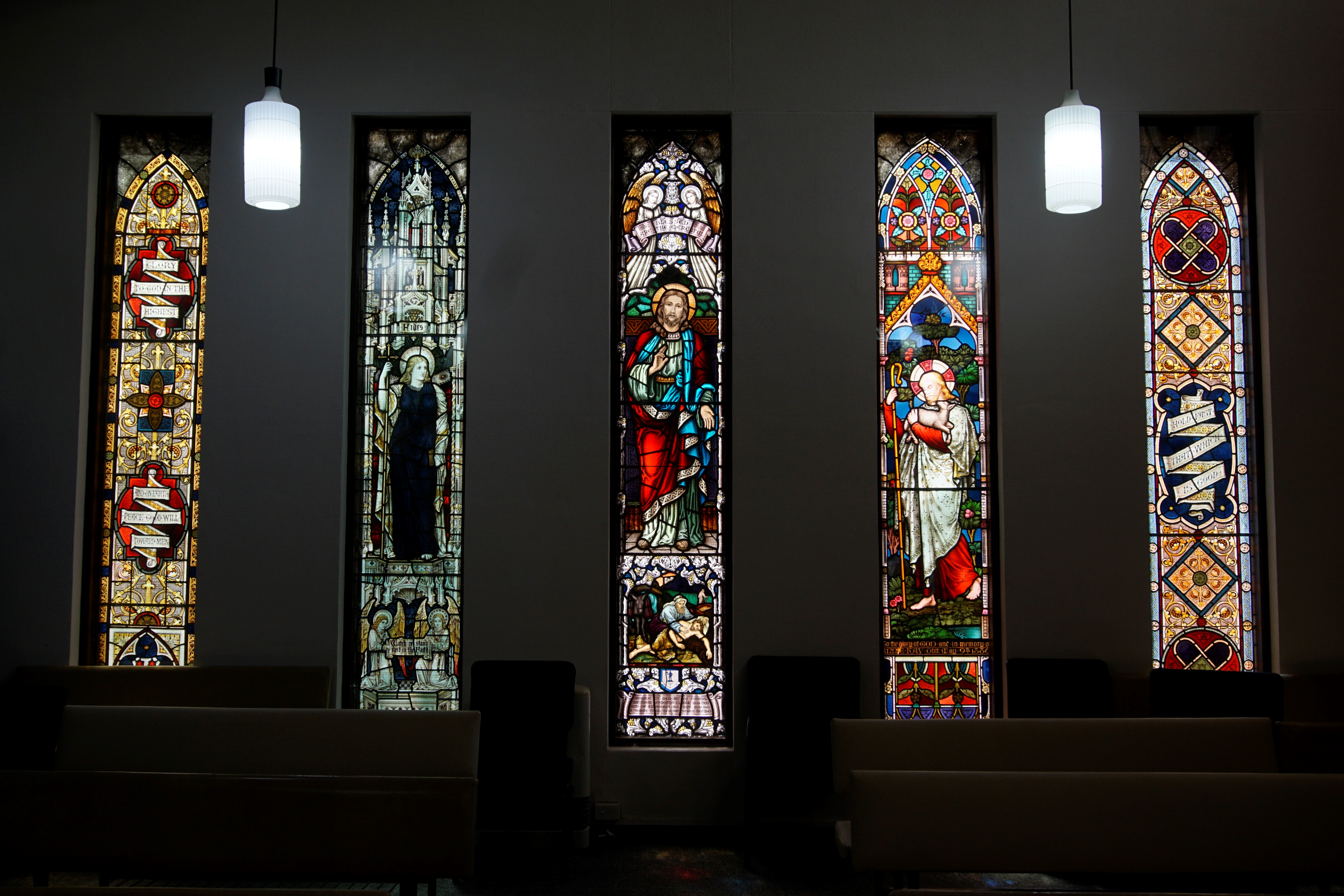
Memorial windows

In 1853 he married Ann "Annie" Catcheside (1826 – 9 May 1886); they had five daughters, notable for the influential Misses Kay's School, which they conducted at the family home, 10 Trinity Street, College Town c. 1888 – December 1904. A stained-glass window to her memory, depicting the Good Shepherd, was installed in the Unitarian Church, Wakefield Street. It was incorporated into the Norwood meeting-house in the early 1970s.

- Florence Kay (1854 – 19 March 1935), occasionally, as "F. Kay", credited in art examination results, the only sister so mentioned. Her work was shown at School of Design exhibitions.
- Sarah Kay (1855 – 23 May 1938)
- Christina/Christine? Kay (1858 – 26 October 1942)
- Margaret Kay (1859 – December 1941)
- Mary Alice Kay (1861 – 1931)

Margaret Overbury (sister of Mary Anstie Overbury) taught at their school for six years.

His brother William Kay J.P. (1829–1889) preceded him as a migrant to South Australia, arriving in 1850. He also briefly farmed at Woodside, perhaps together, and was a member of the same church. He was MLA for East Adelaide 1875–1878, was a founder of the Unitarian church in Adelaide, and on the boards of several prominent companies.
