= Ingram baronets =

Baronetcy in the Baronetage of the United Kingdom

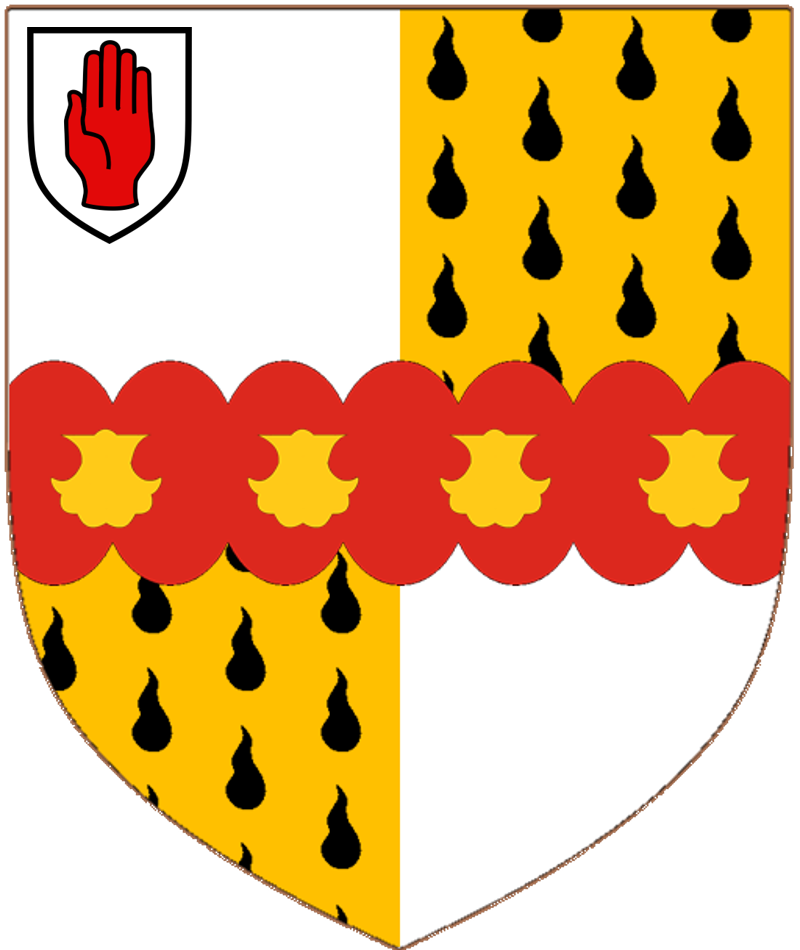
- Escutcheon of the Ingram baronets of Swineshead Abbey
- Creation date: 1893
- Status: extant
- Motto: In hoc signo vinces, Under this sign you shall conquer
- Arms: Per quarter Argent and Or guttee de poix on a Fess invected Gules four Escallops of the second
- Crest: Upon a Rock proper issuant from a Wreath of Cinquefoils Or a Gryphon's Head erased quarterly Gules and Argent charged on the neck with an Escallop counter-changed

The Ingram Baronetcy, The Bungalow, Westgate-on-Sea in the County of Kent and of Swineshead Abbey in the County of Lincoln, is a title in the Baronetage of the United Kingdom. It was created on 9 August 1893 for William Ingram. He was managing director of The Illustrated London News and Liberal Member of Parliament for Boston. Ingram was the son of Herbert Ingram, the founder of The Illustrated London News, who also represented Boston in the House of Commons.

== Ingram baronets, of Swineshead Abbey (1893) ==
- Sir William James Ingram, 1st Baronet (1847–1924)
- Sir Herbert Ingram, 2nd Baronet (1875–1958)
- Sir Herbert Ingram, 3rd Baronet (1912–1980)
- Sir James Herbert Charles Ingram, 4th Baronet (born 1966)

== Extended family ==
Sir Bruce Ingram, younger son of the first Baronet, was also a noted journalist and newspaper editor and served as editor of The Illustrated London News for 63 years.

== Notes ==
Baronetage of the United Kingdom
Preceded by Hingley baronets	Ingram baronets of Swineshead Abbey; 9 August 1893	Succeeded by Broadbent baronets
