= Sir William Ingram, 1st Baronet =

British journalist and Liberal politician (1847-1924)

Sir William James Ingram Bt
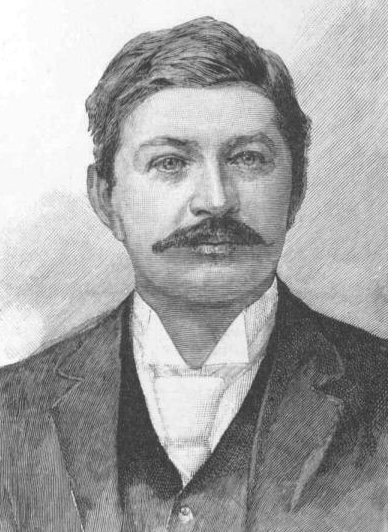
- William Ingram

MP for Boston
- In office 1874–1880 Serving with Thomas Parry
- Preceded by: John Malcolm

MP for Boston
- In office 1885–1886
- Succeeded by: Henry Farmer-Atkinson

MP for Boston
- In office 1892–1895
- Preceded by: Henry Farmer-Atkinson
- Succeeded by: William Garfit

Personal details
- Born: 27 October 1847
- Died: 18 December 1924 (aged 77)
- Party: Liberal
- Spouse: Mary Eliza Collingwood Stirling (m. 1874–1924)
- Children: 3
- Parents: Herbert Ingram (father); Ann Little (mother)
- Relatives: Bruce Ingram (son); Collingwood Ingram (son); Edward Stirling (father-in-law)
- Education: Winchester College, Hampshire; Trinity College, Cambridge

Sir William James Ingram, 1st Baronet (27 October 1847 – 18 December 1924) was a British journalist and Liberal politician who was managing director of The Illustrated London News and who sat in the House of Commons in three periods between 1874 and 1895.

== Life ==
Ingram was the son of Herbert Ingram and his wife Ann Little, daughter of William Little, of the Manor House, Eye, Northamptonshire. His father was the founder of The Illustrated London News, and had also been MP for Boston in Lincolnshire. Ingram was educated at Winchester College and Trinity College, Cambridge. He was admitted at the Middle Temple on 12 April 1869, and at the Inner Temple on 15 January 1870 and was called to the bar at Inner Temple on 18 November 1872.

His father and brother died in a shipping accident on Lake Michigan in 1860 and Ingram eventually took over management of the Illustrated London News. He lived at Walton-on-Thames, Surrey and was a J.P. for Surrey and the Cinque Ports, Kent.

In 1874, Ingram was elected as MP for Boston and held the seat until 1880 when representation was suspended. He won the reconstituted seat in 1885 but lost it in the election of the following year. He regained the seat in 1892 but lost it again three years later in 1895. Ingram was created baronet on 9 August 1893.

Ingram married in 1874, Mary Eliza Collingwood Stirling, daughter of Australian politician Edward Stirling of 34, Queen's Gardens, Hyde Park, and of Adelaide, South Australia. His son Herbert succeeded to the baronetcy. Another son was Collingwood Ingram.

Parliament of the United Kingdom
Preceded by John Malcolm; Thomas Collins	Member of Parliament for Boston; 1874 – 1880; With: Thomas Parry 1874–1874; John Malcolm 1874–1878; Thomas Garfit 1878–1880	Representation suspended
Preceded by Representation resumed	Member of Parliament for Boston; 1885 – 1886	Succeeded by Henry Farmer-Atkinson
Preceded by Henry Farmer-Atkinson	Member of Parliament for Boston; 1892 – 1895	Succeeded by William Garfit
Baronetage of Great Britain
New creation	Baronet (of Swineshead Abbey); 1893–1924	Succeeded by Sir Herbert Ingram, Bt
