= Electoral district of Mount Barker =

Mount Barker South Australia—House of Assembly
- State: South Australia
- Created: 1857
- Abolished: 1902
- Namesake: Mount Barker, South Australia
- Demographic: Rural
- Coordinates: 35°04′S 138°51′E

Mount Barker was an electoral district of the House of Assembly in the Australian state of South Australia from 1857 to 1902.

Mount Barker was also the name of one of the sixteen districts in the unicameral South Australian Legislative Council, which existed from July 1851 to February 1857; John Baker was the elected representative.

The town of Mount Barker is currently represented by the safe Liberal seat of Kavel.

== Members ==
Member	Party	Term	Member	Party	Term
John Dunn		1857–1868	Friedrich Krichauff		1857–1858
John Dunn		1857–1868	William Rogers		1858–1860
John Dunn		1857–1868	Boyle Finniss		1860–1862
John Dunn		1857–1868	Allan McFarlane		1862–1864
John Dunn		1857–1868	William Rogers		1864–1865
John Dunn		1857–1868	James Rankine		1865–1868
John Cheriton		1868–1871	William Rogers		1868–1868
John Cheriton		1868–1871	John Dunn		1868–1868
John Cheriton		1868–1871	William Rogers		1868–1870
John Cheriton		1868–1871	J. G. Ramsay		1870–1875
William West-Erskine		1871–1876	J. G. Ramsay		1870–1875
William West-Erskine		1871–1876	A. H. Landseer		1875–1891
J. G. Ramsay		1876–1878	A. H. Landseer		1875–1891
F. W. Stokes		1878–1881	A. H. Landseer		1875–1891
Lancelot Stirling		1881–1887	A. H. Landseer		1875–1891
John Cockburn		1887–1898	A. H. Landseer		1875–1891
John Cockburn		1887–1898	A. H. Landseer	Defence League	1891–1896
John Cockburn		1887–1898	A. H. Landseer		1896–1899
Charles Dumas		1898–1902	A. H. Landseer		1896–1899
Charles Dumas		1898–1902	Louis von Doussa	National League	1899–1902
