= Hans Heysen =

Australian artist (1877–1968)

Hans Heysen OBE
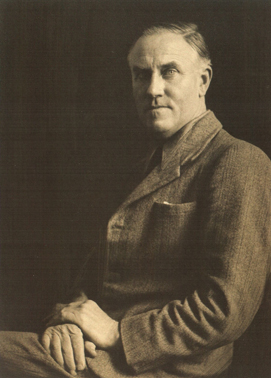
- Hans Heysen by Harold Cazneaux ca. 1935
- Born: Wilhelm Ernst Hans Franz Heysen; 8 October 1877; Hamburg, Germany
- Died: 2 July 1968 (aged 90); Mount Barker, South Australia
- Known for: Painting
- Movement: Adelaide Easel Club
- Children: 8, including Nora Heysen
- Patrons: H. H. Wigg, W. L. Davidson, F. A. Joyner, Charles Henry de Rose

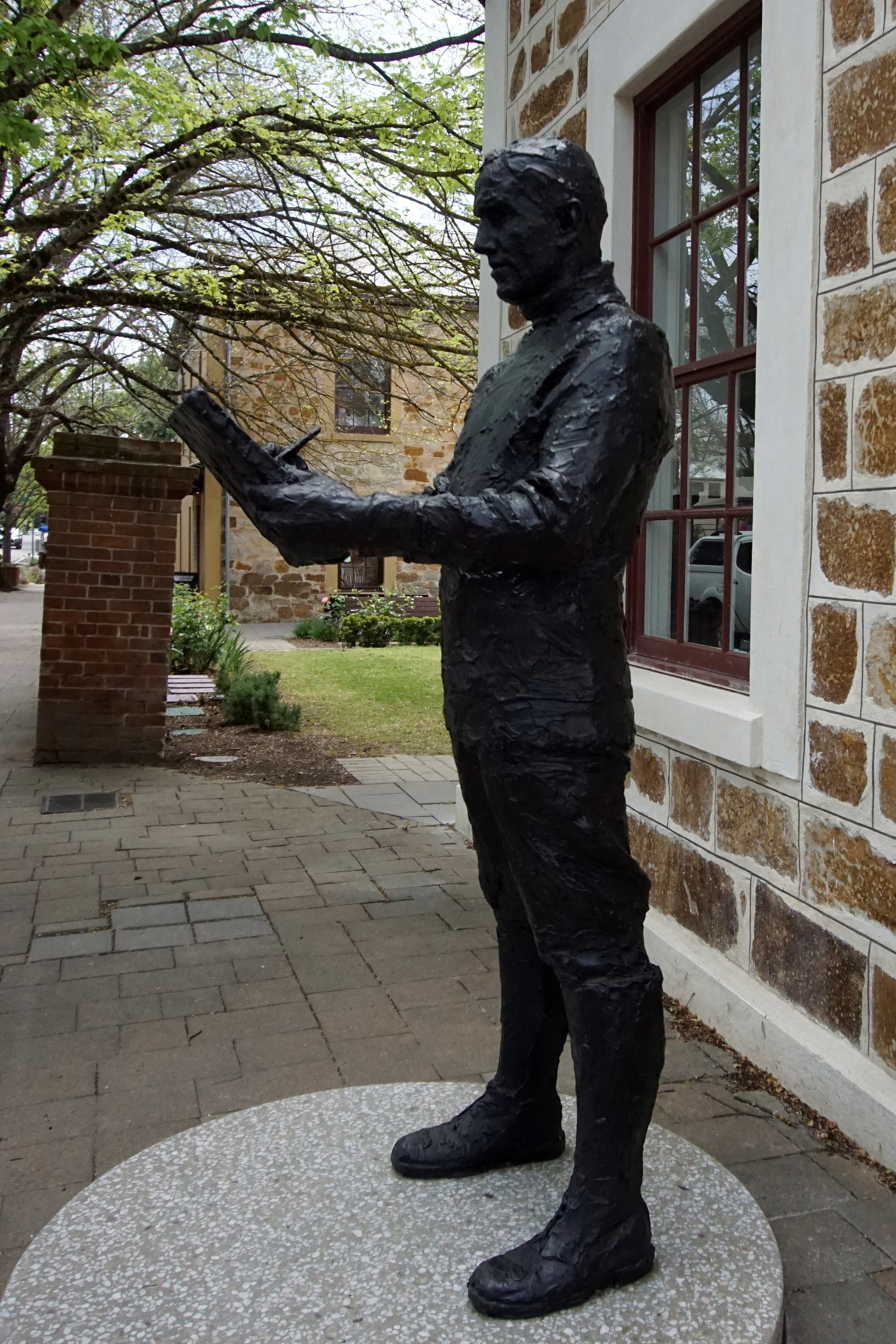
Heysen as a young man; statue in Hahndorf by Robert Hannaford

Droving into the Light, 1914–21, State Art Collection, Art Gallery of Western Australia

Sir Hans Heysen OBE (8 October 1877 – 2 July 1968) was an Australian artist.

One of Australia's best known landscape painters, Heysen became a household name during his lifetime for his watercolours and oil paintings of the Australian bush, in particular men and animals toiling among monumental gum trees against a background of atmospheric light. He also won acclaim for his groundbreaking depictions of arid landscapes in the Flinders Ranges. He won the Wynne Prize for landscape painting a record nine times.

== Biography ==
Wilhelm Ernst Hans Franz Heysen was born in Hamburg, Germany. He migrated to Adelaide in South Australia with his family in 1884 at the age of 7. As a young boy Heysen showed an early interest in art. At 14 he left school to work with a hardware merchant, later taking night classes at the Academy of Arts in Victoria Buildings, Victoria Square, under James Ashton. He joined the Adelaide Easel Club in 1897 and was immediately recognised as a rising talent.

At age 20 he was sponsored by a group of wealthy Adelaide art enthusiasts E. S. Wigg, H. H. Wigg and brothers-in-law W. L. Davidson, F. A. Joyner, and miner Charles Henry de Rose, to study art for four years in France.

By 1912 Hans Heysen had earned enough from his art to purchase a property called "The Cedars" near Hahndorf in the Adelaide Hills, (Note: Co-ordinates: 35.0127°S 138.8057°E) which was his home until his death in 1968 aged 90. "The Cedars", named for its massive Himalayan cedars, has changed little since the 1920s. It remains the property of the Heysen family, but most areas, including Hans's and his daughter Nora's studios, have been open to the public since 1994. In July 2026, a museum and gallery dedicated to Heysen and Nora was opened.

== Family ==
Heysen married Selma "Sallie" Bartels (1878–1962) on 15 December 1904. Her father was Adolph H. F. Bartels, a former mayor of Adelaide. Their children were Josephine, Freya, Lilian, Nora, David, Deirdre, Michael, and Stefan. Nora also became a successful artist, the first woman to win the Archibald Prize in 1938. Freya (1908–1978) married the botanist Edward Stirling Booth.

== Wynne Prize ==
Heysen won the Wynne Prize nine times, for the following works:

- 1904 – Mystic Morn
- 1909 – Summer (watercolour)
- 1911 – Hauling Timber
- 1920 – Toilers (watercolour)
- 1922 – The Quarry (watercolour)
- 1924 – Afternoon in Autumn (watercolour)
- 1926 – Farmyard, Frosty Morning
- 1931 – Red Gums of the Far North (watercolour)
- 1932 – Brachina Gorge

== Recognition ==
- In 1937 Heysen became an invited foundation member of, and exhibited, with Robert Menzies' anti-modernist organisation, the Australian Academy of Art.
- In 1945, he was appointed an Officer of the Order of the British Empire for service as trustee of the Hobart National Gallery
- In 1959, he was made a Knight Bachelor for service to art
- The Heysen Trail and Heysen Tunnels were named after Heysen
- The Electoral district of Heysen in the Parliament of South Australia is named after Heysen

== See also ==
- Australian art

== Notes ==
References
