= William West-Erskine =

Australian politician

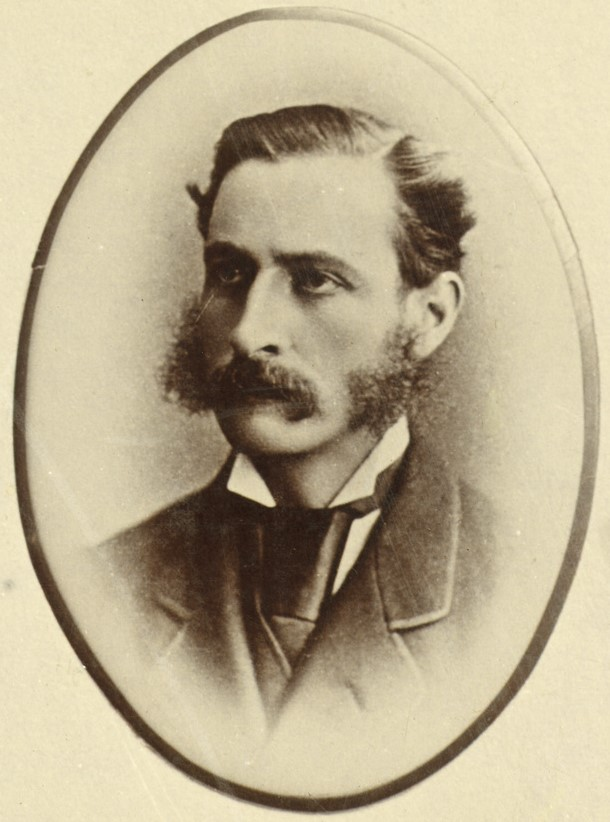

Member of the South Australian House of Assembly for Mount Barker
- In office 27 December 1871 – 21 April 1876

Member of the South Australian House of Assembly for Encounter Bay
- In office 10 October 1878 – April 1881

Commissioner of Public Works
- In office 3 June 1875 – 2 February 1876
- Premier: James Boucaut

Member of the South Australian Legislative Council for Southern District
- In office 8 May 1885 – 11 July 1891

Personal details
- Born: William Alexander Erskine West; 12 September 1839 Annamoe, County Wicklow
- Died: 25 October 1892 (aged 53) England
- Parents: William James West (father); Elmina Erskine (mother)
- Education: Christ Church, Oxford

William Alexander Erskine West-Erskine, M.A., (12 September 1839 – 25 October 1892) was a politician in South Australia.

West-Erskine was the eldest son of Rev. William James West, M.A., Rector of Delgany, Ireland, by his marriage with Elmina, eldest surviving daughter and co-heir of Alexander Erskine, of Bulhall, county Forfar, and Longhaven, county Aberdeen, was born at Annamoe, County Wicklow, Ireland, and was educated at Christ Church, Oxford. Having emigrated to South Australia, he was member for Mount Barker in the South Australian House of Assembly from 1872 to 1875, including eight months as Commissioner of Public Works in the Boucaut Government from June 1875 to February 1876.

He attended the Centennial Exposition in Philadelphia, United States as a commissioner for South Australia in 1876.

Following his return to South Australia he was elected as member for Encounter Bay from 1878 to 1881. West-Erskine was elected to the South Australian Legislative Council in May 1885, but retired in 1891, when he returned to England. In 1872 he assumed the name of Erskine, by royal licence, in addition to his patronymic.

He was a member of the council of the University of Adelaide from its inception in 1874 until he left the colony in 1891.

West-Erskine never married and died in England on 25 October 1892.

Political offices
Preceded by Henry Bright	Commissioner of Public Works; 3 Jun 1875 – 2 Feb 1876	Succeeded by James Boucaut
South Australian House of Assembly
Preceded by John Cheriton	Member for Mount Barker; 1871–1876; Served alongside: James Ramsay, Albert Landseer	Succeeded by James Ramsay
Preceded by James Boucaut	Member for Encounter Bay; 1878–1881; Served alongside: John Parsons	Succeeded by Simpson Newland
