= Lancelot Stirling =

Australian politician (1849–1932)

The Honourable Sir Lancelot Stirling KCMG, OBE
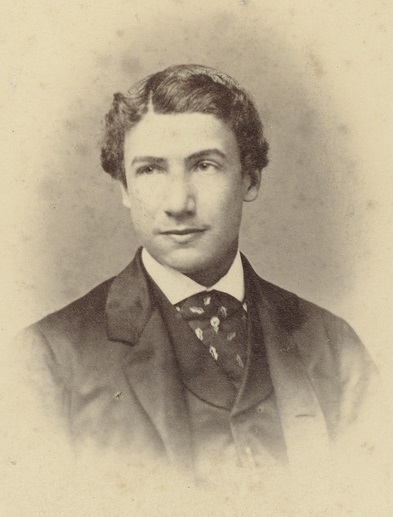

President of the Legislative Council of South Australia
- In office 18 July 1901 – 24 May 1932
- Preceded by: Richard Chaffey Baker
- Succeeded by: David Gordon

Member of the Legislative Council of South Australia
- In office 11 July 1891 – 24 May 1932
- Preceded by: William West-Erskine
- Succeeded by: Reuben Cranstoun Mowbray
- Constituency: Southern District

Member of the House of Assembly
- In office 12 May 1888 – 22 April 1890
- Preceded by: Robert Dalrymple Ross
- Succeeded by: Theodore Hack
- Constituency: Gumeracha
- In office 5 April 1881 – 5 April 1887
- Preceded by: Francis William Stokes
- Succeeded by: John Cockburn
- Constituency: Mount Barker

Personal details
- Born: 5 November 1849 Strathalbyn, South Australia
- Died: 24 May 1932 (aged 82) Strathalbyn, South Australia
- Party: Liberal Union (to 1923); Liberal Federation (from 1923)
- Spouse: Florence Milne (m. 1882)
- Parent: Edward Stirling (father)
- Relatives: Edward Charles Stirling (brother); William Milne (father-in-law)
- Education: Trinity College, Cambridge
- Occupation: Lawyer, politician

Sir John Lancelot Stirling, KCMG, OBE (5 November 1849 – 24 May 1932), generally known as Sir Lancelot Stirling, was an Australian politician and grazier. He was a member of the South Australian House of Assembly from 1881 to 1887, representing Mount Barker, and 1888 to 1890, representing Gumeracha. He was then a member of the South Australian Legislative Council from 1891 to 1932, representing the Southern District. He was President of the Legislative Council from 1901 to 1932 and was Chief Secretary in the seven-day Solomon Ministry of 1899. His non-continuous terms over several decades add up to a total of just under 49 years of service. He is, to date, the longest-serving politician in the history of South Australia.

== Career ==
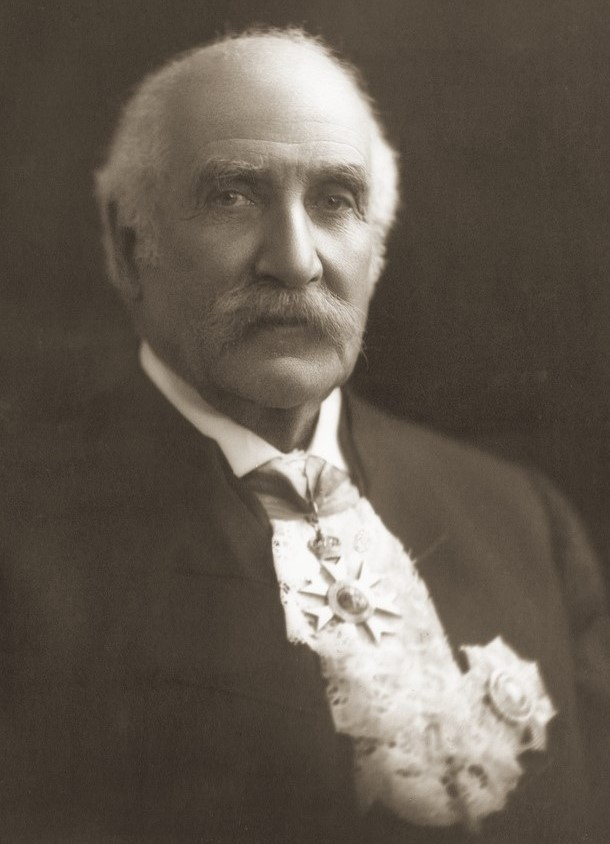
Sir Lancelot in 1926, 6 years before his death

Stirling was made a knight bachelor on 14 August 1902, after the honour had been announced in the 1902 Coronation Honours list published on 26 June 1902. He was appointed a Knight Commander of the Order of St Michael and St George (KCMG) in 1909 and Officer of the Order of the British Empire (OBE) in 1918.

== Family ==
On 2 December 1882, Stirling married Florence Marion, daughter of Sir William Milne and was survived by his wife, three sons and two daughters. His elder daughter Madge Mary Stirling (1887–1940) married Knox Lister Colley (1885 – 7 December 1934) on 28 January 1914. Knox was a grandson of R. B. Colley, first mayor of Glenelg.
