= Harriet Stirling =

South Australian philanthropist

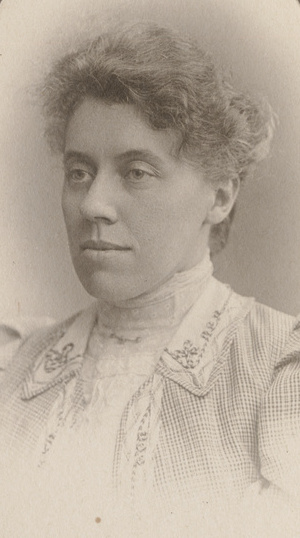
- Born: 15 April 1878; London
- Died: 19 May 1943 (aged 65); Mount Lofty
- Occupation: Child welfare educator, philanthropist
- Parent(s): Edward Charles Stirling
- Awards: Officer of the Order of the British Empire

Harriet Adelaide Stirling JP OBE (15 April 1878 – 19 May 1943) was a South Australian philanthropist.

== History ==
Harriet was born in Great Cumberland Street, London, the eldest daughter of Jane Stirling (née Gilbert; 1848–1936), and her husband Edward C. Stirling, M.B., F.R.C.S., both Australian-born, and brought to Adelaide when she was barely three years old.

She was educated privately at their home in Mt Lofty, and had art lessons, under Mary Anstie Overbury (died 1926), and became interested in several philanthropic causes, particularly those dealing with orphans and children of indigent families, gaining more knowledge and experience during her several trips to Britain, Europe and America.

=== State Children's Council ===
In 1886, the Destitute Persons Act of 1881 was amended to establish a separate honorary body, the State Children's Council, to oversee provisions for bringing up children committed to State institutions, a major issue despite the success of the Boarding Out Society. A newspaper published the facetious advertisement:

President for State Children's Council wanted — no salary. Must be a real live philanthropist, with plenty of money and willing to spend it.

The board, of which her father was the first president had only been in place a year when it resigned over interference with its decisions by the Chief Secretary, namely the too-speedy return of children to the conditions from which they had been rescued.

Stirling, who had been a volunteer with the council since 1901 and a member from 1907, was elected president in 1922, succeeding Walter Hutley (c. 1857–1931).

=== Children's Welfare and Public Relief Board ===
In 1925, the Gunn Labor government enacted the Maintenance Bill to abolish the State Children's Council and the Destitutes Board on the grounds of overlapping responsibilities, and in their place instituted the Children's Welfare and Public Relief Board. The foundation board consisted of: T. H. Atkinson (Chairman), Dr. F. N. Le Messurier, G. F. Claridge, T. J. Matters, and P. O'Connor, M R. Hewitt, and Lucy Hone, H. A. Stirling and D. Vaughan, sister of Crawford Vaughan.

Stirling remained a member until 1941, when she resigned due to ill-health.

=== Mothers and Babies Health Association ===
Stirling was in 1909 a member of the committee that founded the School for Mothers Institute under the auspices of the Kindergarten Union, and devoted much time and energy to the organization. Others on the committee included Dr. Helen Mayo, Mrs Delprat, Lilian Delissa and A. L. Tomkinson. The first "classes" of the organisation, which became the School for Mothers Institute and Baby Health Centre (Incorporated), then in 1927 the Mothers and Babies' Health Association, were held at the Franklin Street free kindergarten, which then had its headquarters on Wright Street.

=== Babies' Aid ===
The Babies' Aid Society was founded in 1910 to provide practical, "scientifically designed" clothing for babies under one year of age. Mrs Napier Birks was the founding president, and Miss Ethelwyne Goyder was the secretary. Stirling was in charge of the garments, over 1,000 of which were distributed annually. Stirling was still active with the organisation twenty years later.

=== Babies' homes ===
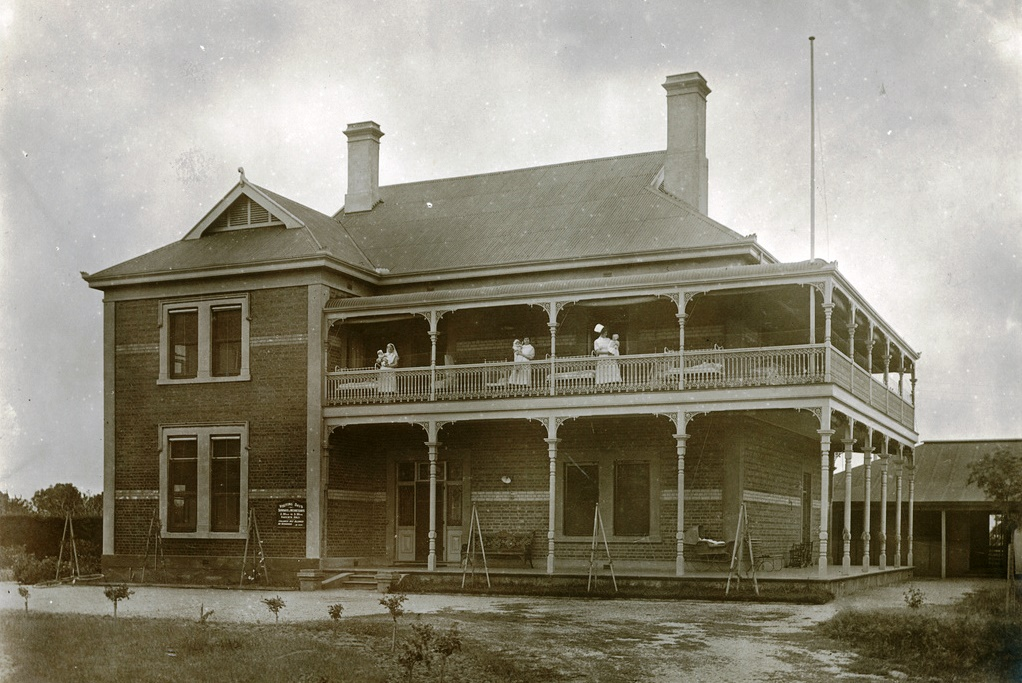
Mareeba Babies' Home, Woodville Park c. 1921

Quambi Nursing Home, founded in 1913 by the Babies' Hospital Association and run by Elizabeth Bartels, née Jeffery, was a private hospital on Pennington Street, North Adelaide, for sick babies under the age of two. A tent was set up in the grounds for parents who could not afford the cot fees. The Home became overcrowded, and the Association leased another building in Winchester Street, St Peters. In 1915, this became the Babies' Hospital.

This too became overcrowded and "Mareeba", a building in Woodville used as a Red Cross convalescent hospital for soldiers, then relinquished by the army, was purchased by the state government, handed over to the Babies' Hospital Association in July 1917, and officially opened the following month.

Lady Galway was president of the Association, Mrs. Teesdale Smith hon. Treasurer, and Harriet Stirling, Hon. secretary. The committee comprised Miss Macaulay (Lady Galway's companion), Miss Annie Hornabrook (1865–1938), daughter of C. A. Hornabrook, Mrs. Alfred W. Styles, Miss Amy Jessop, Mrs. Austin Hewitt, Dr. James A. Bonnin, Dr. Hampden Carr, Dr. C. T. C. de Crespigny, Dr. Harry Gilbert, Dr. Frank S. Hone, Dr. Helen Mayo, and Stanley H. Skipper.

== Recognition ==
- Stirling and Amy Louisa Tomkinson (1858–1943) were appointed Justices of the Peace in South Australia in January 1917, the fifth and sixth women so honoured in South Australia. The first four, appointed in July 1915, were:

- Elizabeth Webb Nicholls née Bakewell (1850 – 1943), president of the W.C.T.U.
- Anne Elizabeth Price, née Lloyd (c. 1860 – 1 September 1950), widow of Tom Price, first Labor Premier of South Australia
- Elizabeth Cullen née ?? ( – 6 August 1922), a member of the board of Adelaide Hospital 1896– married to Patrick Peter Cullen ( – 5 October 1909)
- Cecilia Emma Dixon (1872–1964), secretary of the. Y.W.C.A., later organising secretary, Travellers' Aid Society.

- Stirling was awarded an OBE in the 1936 King's Birthday Honours
