= Edward Charles Stirling =

Australian politician (1848–1919)

Sir Edward Stirling CMG FRS FRCS
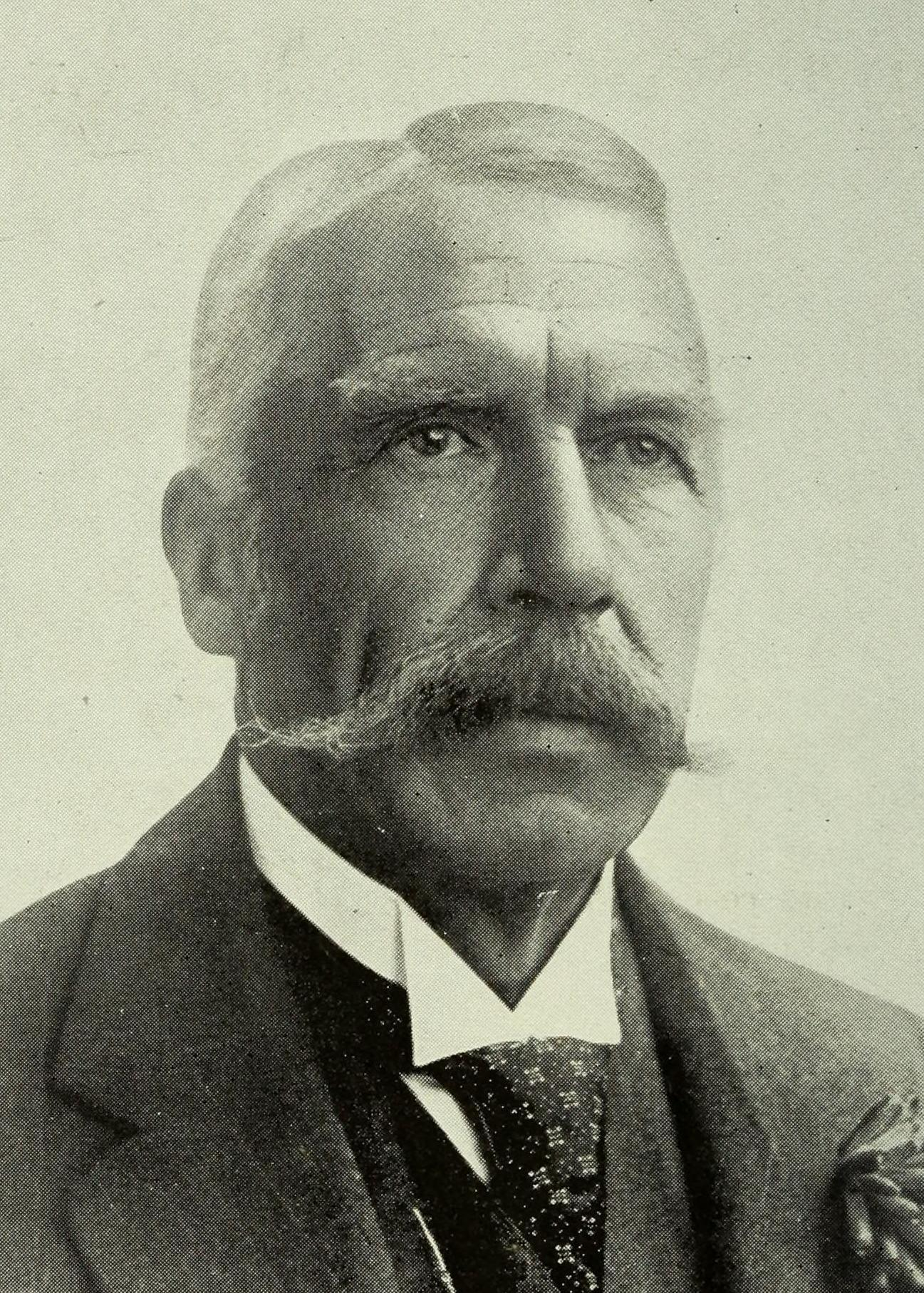

Member of the South Australian House of Assembly
- In office 8 April 1884 – 18 March 1887
- Succeeded by: Lewis Cohen
- Constituency: North Adelaide

Personal details
- Born: 8 September 1848 Strathalbyn, South Australia, Australia
- Died: 20 March 1919 (aged 70) Mount Lofty, South Australia, Australia
- Cause of death: Bronchitis
- Spouse: Jane Gilbert (m. 1877)
- Children: Five daughters including Harriet Adelaide Stirling and two sons
- Parents: Edward Stirling (father); Harriett, née Taylor (mother)
- Relatives: John Lancelot Stirling (brother)
- Education: Trinity College, Cambridge
- Occupation: Scientist
- Scientific career
- Known for: Development of rhododendron varieties
- Fields: Anthropology, physiology, botany
- Author abbrev. (botany): Stirling

Sir Edward Charles Stirling CMG FRS FRCS (8 September 1848 – 20 March 1919) was an Australian anthropologist and the first professor of physiology at the University of Adelaide.

== Early life and education ==
Edward Charles Stirling was born on 8 September 1848 at "The Lodge" Strathalbyn, South Australia, the eldest son of the Hon. Edward Stirling and his wife Harriett, née Taylor His father was the illegitimate child of a Scottish planter in Jamaica and an unknown woman of colour.

== Career ==
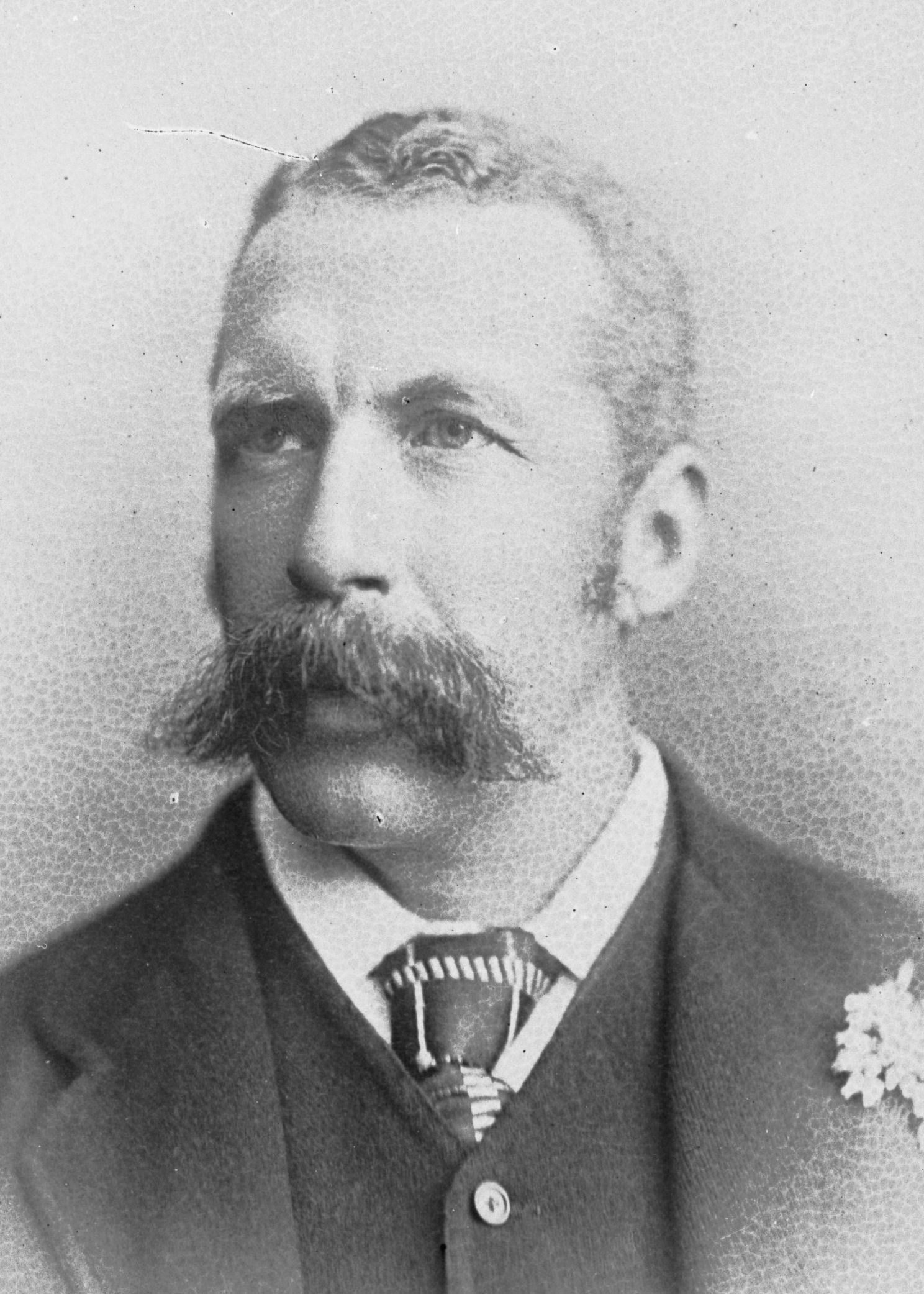
Stirling as a young man

In 1884 Stirling was elected to the South Australian Legislative Assembly for North Adelaide and sat for three years.

There he proved an innovator and speaker for the rights of women, becoming the first person in Australasia to introduce a bill for women's suffrage. On 22 July 1885, the year after his election, he proposed the following motion for women's suffrage: 'That in the opinion of this House, women... who fulfil the conditions and possess the qualifications on which the parliamentary franchise for the Legislative Council is granted to men, shall, like them, be admitted to the franchise for both Houses of Parliament.' He then expanded on his argument for women's suffrage using the following quote from Plato: "There is no natural difference between the sexes except in strength and both should equally participate in the Government of the State." By this time he had four daughters of his own, and he wanted them to grow up in a fairer society. Then in 1886 he introduced a formal bill for women's suffrage into the South Australian parliament.

Not only was Stirling committed to the political rights of women, but he also believed in their right to a proper education. He lectured at the Advanced School for Girls, and also campaigned for women to be admitted to Adelaide University's School of Medicine.

Stirling was appointed the first president of the State Children's Council by its founder Catherine Helen Spence. A later president was his oldest daughter Harriet, who also founded the Mothers and Babies Health Association with Helen Mayo.

Stirling had other interests and duties. He was chairman of the South Australian Museum committee in 1884–5 and in 1889 became honorary director of the museum. In 1890 he went overland with South Australia's Governor, Lord Kintore, from Port Darwin to Adelaide and collected much flora and fauna including several specimens of the marsupial mole Notoryctes typhlops, described and illustrated in his paper in the Transactions and Proceedings of the Royal Society of South Australia, 1891, p. 154. In 1893 he investigated at Lake Callabonna a remarkable deposit of fossil bones, and with A. H. C. Zietz reconstructed the complete skeleton of the enormous marsupial Diprotodon australis and partially reconstructed an immense wombat and a bird allied to the New Zealand moa. Also in 1893, Stirling and Zietz described five new species of Australian lizards. He was also responsible for the collection of human remains of Indigenous Australians, some of which were shipped to overseas institutions. In the 21st century, the museum started pursuing an active policy of repatriation and reburial of these remains.

Stirling was interred at the North Road Cemetery, where his grave now lies near those of several other family members. He was survived by his wife and five daughters (two sons predeceased him).

== Personal life ==
In 1882, Stirling settled near the Adelaide Hills town of Stirling, which had been named after his father. He named his 6½-acre property St Vigeans, after the Scottish town where his father had gone to school. A fine two-storey house was constructed in 1882–83, and during the following decades, Stirling himself oversaw the establishment of one of Australia's finest private botanical gardens which included trees and shrubs imported from interstate and overseas. As a fellow of the Royal Horticultural Society in London, he had access to many species of plants. A major feature of his gardens were South Australia's first rhododendrons, one of which was named "Mrs E. C. Stirling", and several new varieties were developed by Stirling and his head-gardener. St Vigeans was sold following the death of Jane Stirling, his widow.

He had five daughters, who benefited from an excellent education. Harriet (1878–1943) went on to earn an OBE for her work with mothers and children, and Jane (1881–1966) earned a Bachelor of Science degree from Adelaide University and later played viola in the South Australian Orchestra.

== Family ==
Edward Charles Stirling married Jane Gilbert (1848–1936) on 27 June 1877. Their offspring were:

- Harriet Adelaide "Harrie" Stirling JP OBE (15 April 1878 – 19 May 1943), philanthropist
- Anna Florence Stirling (1879–1939) married (Sydney) Russell Booth (died 1949) in 1910

- Edward Stirling Booth (19 August 1911 – 16 March 1997), botanist, zoologist

- Jane Winifred "Jeannie" Stirling (1881–1966); studied science at Uni, played viola in SA Orchestra, married Thorburn Brailsford Robertson, one of her father's students, on 8 July 1910
- (Alice) Mary Stirling (1884–1925); an Exhibition (form of scholarship) to be competed for among Hills schools was raised in her memory
- Nina Eliza Emmeline Stirling (1888–1976) married Maxwell Jaffrey on 29 August 1927.
- Edward Taylor Stirling (1889–1897) died falling from a tree aged 7;
- Gilbert Lancelot Stirling (1893–1893)

Stirling's brother John Lancelot Stirling was also prominent in South Australian public life.

His eldest sister Mary Eliza Collingwood Stirling married William James Ingram MP on 10 November 1874.

== Honours and awards ==
Stirling received many honours, of which he particularly valued being admitted as a Fellow of the Royal Society in 1893. In the same year, he was also awarded an CMG Other awards included the Queen Regent of Holland's Gold Medal for 'services to art and science' in 1892, and an honorary Doctorate in Science from Trinity College Cambridge in 1910.
