= Francis William Stokes =

Australian politician and pastoralist

Francis William Stokes (c. 1832 – 2 August 1889) was a pastoralist and politician in the colony of South Australia.

Stokes was a son of the Rev. John Stokes, Vicar of Cobham and Rector of Milton, Kent, and emigrated to South Australia on the British Empire in 1850, and after staying a few months in the city undertook the management of a station for Anstey & Giles. He founded the firm of Grant & Stokes to run Coonatto (Konetta ?) Station, and were also associated with the Wellington Station in which Sir William Jervois, was later interested. Stokes also had an interest in the Willowie Pastoral Company.

He represented the seat of Mount Barker in the House of Assembly from April 1878 to April 1881.

He did not seek re-election and paid a visit to England, but during the return voyage he received a paralytic stroke while on the Red Sea. After twelve months he returned to England, where he lived with his brother, Lieutenant-General Sir John Stokes K.C.B, R.E.

== Family ==
On 17 April 1861 Stokes married Emily Rebecca Giles (1836 – 24 January 1929), a daughter of William Giles. They had no children.

C. E. Stokes, of Port Augusta then Prospect, and F. H. Stokes, of South-terrace were nephews.
