= Edward Stirling Booth =

Edward Stirling Booth (19 August 1911 – 16 March 1997), commonly referred to as Ted Booth, was an Australian botanist.

== History ==
Booth was born in Adelaide, the only son of S(ydney) Russell Booth (died 1949) and Anna Florence Stirling (died 14 May 1939), who married in 1910. His father was a chartered accountant and director of several corporations; his mother was a daughter of Professor Stirling.

He had a privileged life, growing up in North Adelaide, where he attended a small private school before St Peter's College. He completed his BSc in 1932, and Honours in Zoology at Adelaide University in 1933, while also studying art in North Adelaide. He had a scholarship for further study at Melbourne University, but quit after one year and returned to Adelaide.

He became interested in conifers, and curated the herbarium attached to the University of Adelaide's Botany Department. He also planted them liberally at his family home "Arbroath", near Stirling, in the Adelaide Hills.

Following the death of J. M. Black, author of The Flora of South Australia, the Adelaide Botanic Garden had need of a botanist to collate its various collections, which Booth filled until 1955, but he declined the offer of a full-time position as keeper of the State Herbarium, which instead went to Hansjörg Eichler, however Booth stayed on for another five months as an unpaid assistant, and a long-lasting friendship developed between the Booths and Hansjörg and Marlies Eichler.

Another strong friendship and artistic collaboration which developed during this period was with the botanical artist Ludwik Dutkiewicz.

From 1955 Ted pursued personal interests: poetry, art and photography.

== Recognition ==
In 2011 Anna Stirling Pope, a granddaughter of Booth, created a personal tribute "Ted's Story", which is free to view on YouTube. (see External links below)

== Family ==
Edward Stirling Booth married Freya Heysen on 25 August 1938 in a small ceremony at "The Cedars", home of Sir Hans Heysen (Freya was the Heysens' second daughter). They had two sons:

- Andrew Stirling Russell Booth
- Edward Heysen Stirling Booth (c. 1 March 1942 – ) married Jane Blatchford Bird of Belair on 25 November 1967

Booth had a sister, Anna Dorothea "Nan" Booth (1917 – ) who married Robert Hay Morrison on 20 September 1939.
