= Herbert Ingram =

British journalist & politician (1811-1860)

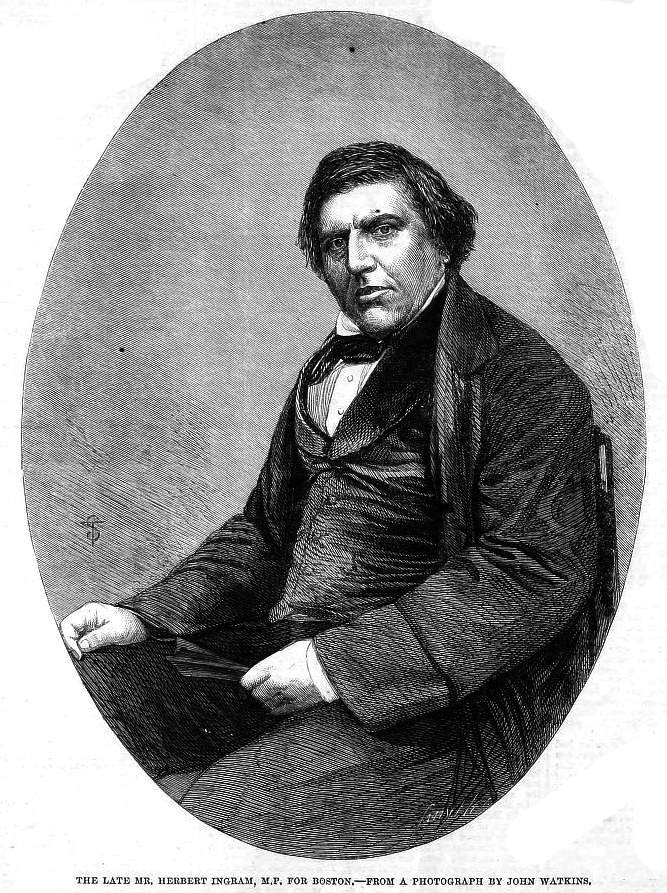

Member of Parliament for Boston
- In office 1856–1860 Serving with Benjamin Bond Cabbell (1856-57); William Henry Adams (1857-59); Meaburn Staniland (1859-60)
- Preceded by: Benjamin Bond Cabbell; Gilbert Heathcote
- Succeeded by: John Malcolm; Meaburn Staniland

Personal details
- Born: 27 May 1811 Boston, Lincolnshire, England
- Died: 8 September 1860 (aged 49) Lake Michigan, Illinois, United States
- Cause of death: Drowned
- Party: Liberal
- Relatives: William Ingram (son); A. N. Hornby (son-in-law); John Hornby (grandson); Albert Hornby (grandson)
- Education: Laughton's Charity School

Herbert Ingram (27 May 1811 – 8 September 1860) was a British journalist and politician. He is considered the father of pictorial journalism through his founding of The Illustrated London News, the first illustrated magazine. He was a Liberal politician who favoured social reform and represented Boston for four years until his early death in the shipwreck of the Lady Elgin.

== Early life ==
Ingram was born at Paddock Grove in Boston, Lincolnshire, the son of a butcher. After being educated at Laughton's Charity School and the free school in Wormgate (a street in Boston), he was apprenticed as a 14-year-old to town printer Joseph Clarke. When Ingram finished his training, he moved to London, where he worked as a journeyman printer.

In 1832, Ingram established his own printing and newsagents business in Nottingham, in partnership with his brother-in-law, Nathaniel Cooke. As a newsagent, he noticed that when newspapers included woodcuts, their sales increased. He concluded that making a good profit would be possible from a magazine that included a large number of illustrations. However, a while was needed before he could put this theory into practice.

In 1841, Ingram launched 'Parr's Life Pills', a patent medicine which he claimed was based on a recipe devised by Thomas Parr, a man believed to have lived for 152 years. Although the pills had no provable medical benefit, Ingram's marketing methods were very successful, and the profits from the pills provided the capital that enabled him to set up The Illustrated London News.

== The Illustrated London News ==
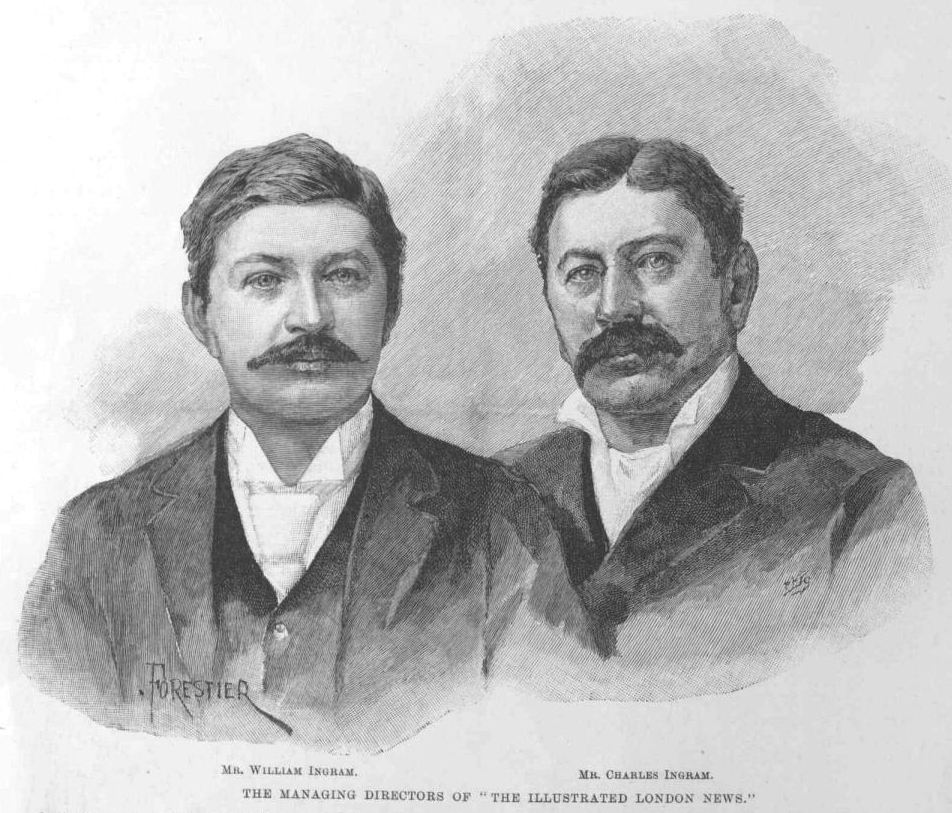
The managing directors of The Illustrated London News, Herbert's sons William and Charles

Ingram moved back to London, and after discussing the matter with his friend, Mark Lemon, editor of Punch, he decided to start his own magazine, The Illustrated London News. The first edition appeared on 14 May 1842. Costing sixpence, the magazine had 16 pages and 32 woodcuts and targeted a broadly middle-class readership. It included pictures of the war in Afghanistan, a train crash in France, a steam boat explosion in Canada, and a fancy dress ball at Buckingham Palace. That pictorials were viewed as being as important as text for reporting was clear from the first issue, which stated that the aim was to bring within the public grasp "... the very form and presence of events as they transpire; and whatever the broad and palpable delineations of wood engraving can achieve, will now be brought to bear upon every subject which attracts the attention of mankind".

Ingram was a staunch Liberal who favoured social reform. He announced in The Illustrated London News that the concern of the magazine would be "with the English poor" and the "three essential elements of discussion with us will be the poor laws, the factory laws, and the working of the mining system". Despite arguing the case for social reform, the paper claimed to be nonpartisan. Its first editorial had stated, "We commence our political discourse by a disavowal of the unconquerable aversion to the name of Party." However, this may have been no more than a desire to gain the widest possible readership, because as time progressed, the paper displayed its Whig inclination. It showed moderation and caution in its reportage and this extended to that of the Irish Famine, which was largely sympathetic, even if not quite able to denounce the inadequacy of government policy or the ideas of prevailing economic or political orthodoxy. It had none of the overt negative stereotyping found in the most acerbic Punch cartoons. It showed an overall attitude that England had a responsibility towards the victims of what was largely interpreted as a natural disaster.

The magazine was an immediate success, and the first edition sold 26,000 copies. Within a few months, it was selling over 65,000 copies a week. High prices were charged for advertisements, and Ingram was soon making £12,000 a year from this publishing venture. Encouraged by the success of The Illustrated London News, Ingram decided in 1848 to start a daily newspaper, the London Telegraph. When Andrew Spottiswoode started a rival paper, the Pictorial Times, Ingram purchased it and merged it with the Illustrated London News. In 1855, Ingram took over another rival, the Illustrated Times.

Ingram employed leading artists of the day to illustrate social events, news stories, and towns and cities. The whole spectrum of Victorian Britain was recorded pictorially in The Illustrated London News for many decades; special events were important to its success. The magazine did very well during the Great Exhibition of 1851 and the edition that reported the funeral of the Duke of Wellington in 1852 sold between 150,000 and 250,000 copies, according to various accounts. Illustrations came from all corners of the globe. By 1855, Ingram was using colour and had artists in Great Britain and continental Europe racing to the scene of stories to capture the drama in print. The Crimean War caused a further boost to sales. By 1863, after Ingram's death, The Illustrated London News was selling over 300,000 copies a week, far higher than other journals. Newspapers such as the Daily News sold 6,000 copies at this time, and even the largest-selling newspaper, The Times, only sold 70,000 copies.

== MP for Boston ==
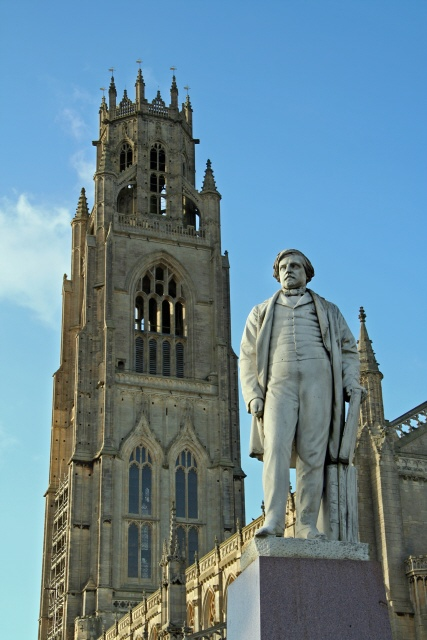
Statue honoring Ingram in Boston, Lincolnshire

In 1856, Ingram became the Liberal candidate in a by-election in his home town of Boston. With help from his friends Mark Lemon and Douglas Jerrold at Punch, and from the team at The Illustrated London News, Ingram advocated a policy of social reform. He told the people of Boston they needed a "representative who is at once the product and the embodiment of the progressive spirit of the age". The electorate responded to Ingram's message and he won an overwhelming victory. However, several daily newspapers attacked Punch and The Illustrated London News for the part they had played in Ingram's victory.

He continued his campaign for social reform in the House of Commons until his death four years later.

Ingram was instrumental in bringing the Great Northern Railway to Boston, which forged new links with other parts of the country and got the town on track for a new era of growth. He also played a major part in supplying fresh piped water to the town, a move that was met with rejoicing and brass bands when the taps were turned on for the first time.

== Death and legacy ==
In 1860, Ingram went to the US with his eldest son to obtain material for The Illustrated London News. On 8 September, they were aboard the Lady Elgin on Lake Michigan when the ship was sunk after colliding with another vessel. Herbert Ingram, his son, and hundreds of other passengers were drowned. Herbert was brought back to Boston for burial in the Boston Cemetery on Horncastle Road. His son's body was never found and identified and was probably buried in an unmarked grave in Winnetka near Chicago. Another of Ingram's sons, William, took over the newspaper, and was also MP for Boston and became a baronet.

A statue of Ingram is in the Market Place in Boston in front of St. Botolph's Church (Boston "Stump"). The statue was designed by Alexander Munro (sculptor) and was unveiled in October 1862. The allegorical figure at the base of the monument is a reference to Ingram's efforts to bring the first piped water to the town.

Parliament of the United Kingdom
Preceded by Benjamin Bond Cabbell and Gilbert Heathcote	Member of Parliament for Boston; 1856–1861; With: Benjamin Bond Cabbell 1856–1857; William Henry Adams 1857–1859; Meaburn Staniland 1859–1860	Succeeded by John Malcolm and Meaburn Staniland
