= Thomas Wentworth (British Army officer) =

British Army officer, politician and diplomat (1693–1747)

Lieutenant-General Thomas Wentworth MP
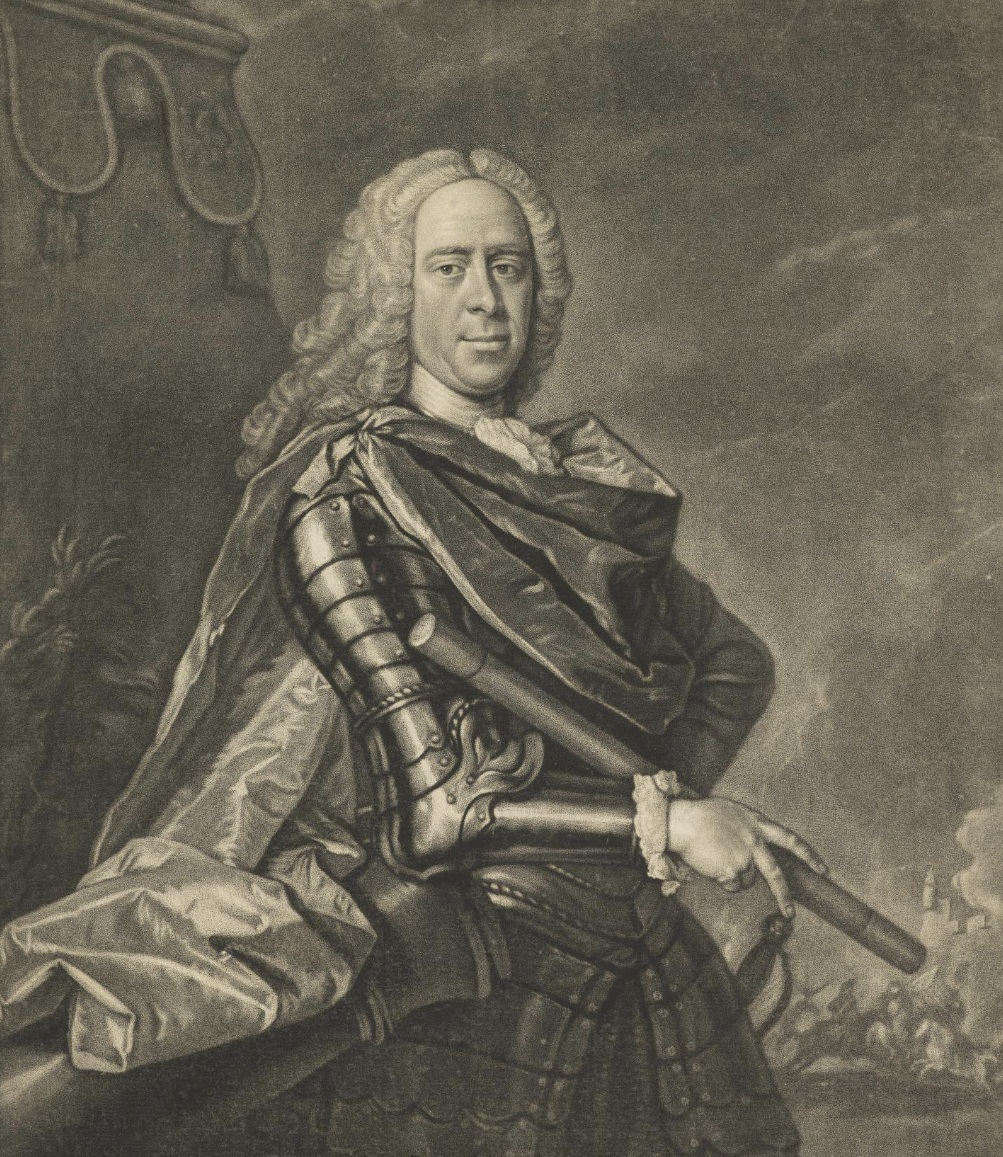
- Engraving by Alexander Van Haecken after an Allan Ramsay portrait, c. 1747
- Born: c. 1693; England
- Died: November 1747 (aged 53–54)
- Military career
- Allegiance: Great Britain
- Branch: British Army
- Service years: 1715–1747
- Rank: Lieutenant-general
- Units: 1st Troop of Horse Grenadier Guards; 1st Regiment of Foot Guards
- Commands: 39th Regiment of Foot; 24th Regiment of Foot; 2nd Irish Horse
- Conflicts: War of Jenkins' Ear; Battle of Cartagena de Indias; War of the Austrian Succession; Jacobite rising of 1745

Lieutenant-General Thomas Wentworth (c. 1693 – November 1747) was a British Army officer, politician and diplomat who represented Whitchurch in the House of Commons of Great Britain from 1743 to 1747. He served in the War of Jenkins' Ear, War of the Austrian Succession and Jacobite rising of 1745.

== Early life ==
Thomas Wentworth was born in c. 1693, the third but second surviving son of Sir Mathew Wentworth, 3rd Baronet of West Bretton and his wife Elizabeth, the daughter of William Osbaldeston of Hunmanby. He was the younger brother of Sir William Wentworth, 4th Baronet. Wentworth matriculated at University College, Oxford on 28 January 1710 at the age 16. He married Elizabeth Lord, daughter of Robert Lord of London on 3 July 1720.

== Career ==
In March 1715, Wentworth was commissioned into the British Army's 1st Troop of Horse Grenadier Guards at the rank of lieutenant. He transferred to the 1st Regiment of Foot Guards at the rank of captain in October of that year. In 1718, Wentworth was promoted to lieutenant colonel of the Prince of Wales's Own Royal Regiment of Welsh Fusiliers, and was promoted again to colonel and appointed Adjutant-General to the Forces in 1722. From 1732 to 1737, he was colonel of what was ranked as the 39th Regiment of Foot, before becoming colonel of what was ranked as the 24th Regiment of Foot from 1737 to 1745.

Wentworth was promoted to brigadier general in 1739 and again to major general in 1741. In the same year, he was appointed commander of the army contingent of a British expeditionary force sent to capture Cartagena de Indias from as part of the War of Jenkins' Ear. Wentworth was chosen after the death of the original commander, Major-general Lord Cathcart. He and his troops arrived in a fleet commanded by Rear-Admiral of the Red Sir Chaloner Ogle to reinforce another portion of the expeditionary force under Vice-Admiral of the White Edward Vernon. However, Wentworth quarrelled with Vernon and the British proved unable to capture Cartagena de Indias, withdrawing after losing thousands of men to tropical diseases.

When William voted against a motion by the Walpole ministry to increase Prince William, Duke of Cumberland's allowance in 1737, Wentworth wrote to his distant relative Thomas Watson-Wentworth to complain:

My brother thought fit on that occasion to leave his old friends and to join the minority, which has put me under a difficulty... Your Lordship may easily imagine that my hopes of being removed to an older regiment will by this accident be very much weakened.

Wentworth was returned as Member of Parliament in the House of Commons of Great Britain for Whitchurch at a parliamentary by-election in 1743. He voted with the Carteret ministry in 1744, and then served in Flanders as part of the War of the Austrian Succession. In 1745, Wentworth was promoted to lieutenant-general, made colonel of what would become the 2nd Irish Horse and served under Field Marshal George Wade in his march to Newcastle-upon-Tyne during the Jacobite rising of 1745. He was appointed the British ambassador to Sardinia in 1746. Wentworth died without issue in November 1747.

Parliament of Great Britain
Preceded by John Selwyn; Charles Clarke	Member of Parliament for Whitchurch; 1743–1747; With: John Selwyn	Succeeded by John Selwyn; Charles Wallop
Military offices
Preceded by Sir John Cope	Colonel of Thomas Wentworth's Regiment of Foot; 1732–1737	Succeeded by John Campbell
Preceded by Thomas Howard	Colonel of Thomas Wentworth's Regiment of Foot; 1737–1745	Succeeded by Daniel Houghton
Preceded by The Viscount Cobham	Colonel of Thomas Wentworth's Regiment of Horse; 1745–1747	Succeeded by Thomas Bligh
