= Lord Vere Bertie =

British politician

The Right Honourable Lord Vere Bertie

Member of Parliament for Boston
- In office 1741–1754 Serving with John Michell
- Preceded by: Albemarle Bertie; Richard Fydell
- Succeeded by: Lord Robert Bertie; Charles Amcotts

Personal details
- Born: c. 1712
- Died: 13 September 1768 (aged 55–56)
- Spouse: Anne Casey (after 1736)
- Children: 4, including Albinia
- Parent(s): Robert Bertie, 1st Duke of Ancaster and Kesteven; Albinia Farrington
- Education: Westminster School

Lord Vere Bertie (c. 1712 – 13 September 1768) was a British politician, a younger son of the Duke of Ancaster and Kesteven who represented Boston, Lincolnshire in Parliament from 1741 to 1754.

== Early life ==
Bertie was the third son of Robert Bertie, 1st Duke of Ancaster and Kesteven, and the first son by his second marriage to Albinia Farrington. His elder brothers were Robert Bertie, styled Lord Willoughby, who died while studying at the Wolfenbüttel Ritter-Akademie, and Peregrine Bertie, 2nd Duke of Ancaster and Kesteven.

His paternal grandparents were Robert Bertie, 3rd Earl of Lindsey and, his second wife, the Hon. Elizabeth Wharton (a daughter of the 4th Baron Wharton). His maternal grandparents were Maj.-Gen. William Farington of Chislehurst and Theodosia Betenson (sister and co-heiress of Sir Edward Betenson, 1st Baronet).

He was educated at Westminster School from 1724 to 1728.

== Career ==
Lord Vere was commissioned an ensign in the 2nd Regiment of Foot Guards on 19 March 1728/9, retiring in July 1737.

In the 1741 election, Bertie was returned as Member of Parliament for Boston on his family's interest. He voted with the Carteret ministry to support the Hanoverian Army in 1742, but defected from them on the same question in January 1744. He did not vote in the 1746 division on the Hanoverian subsidies, but after the 1747 election, when he was returned again after a contest, was considered to have gone into opposition to the Pelham ministry.

Bertie stood down from Parliament in 1754.

== Personal life ==
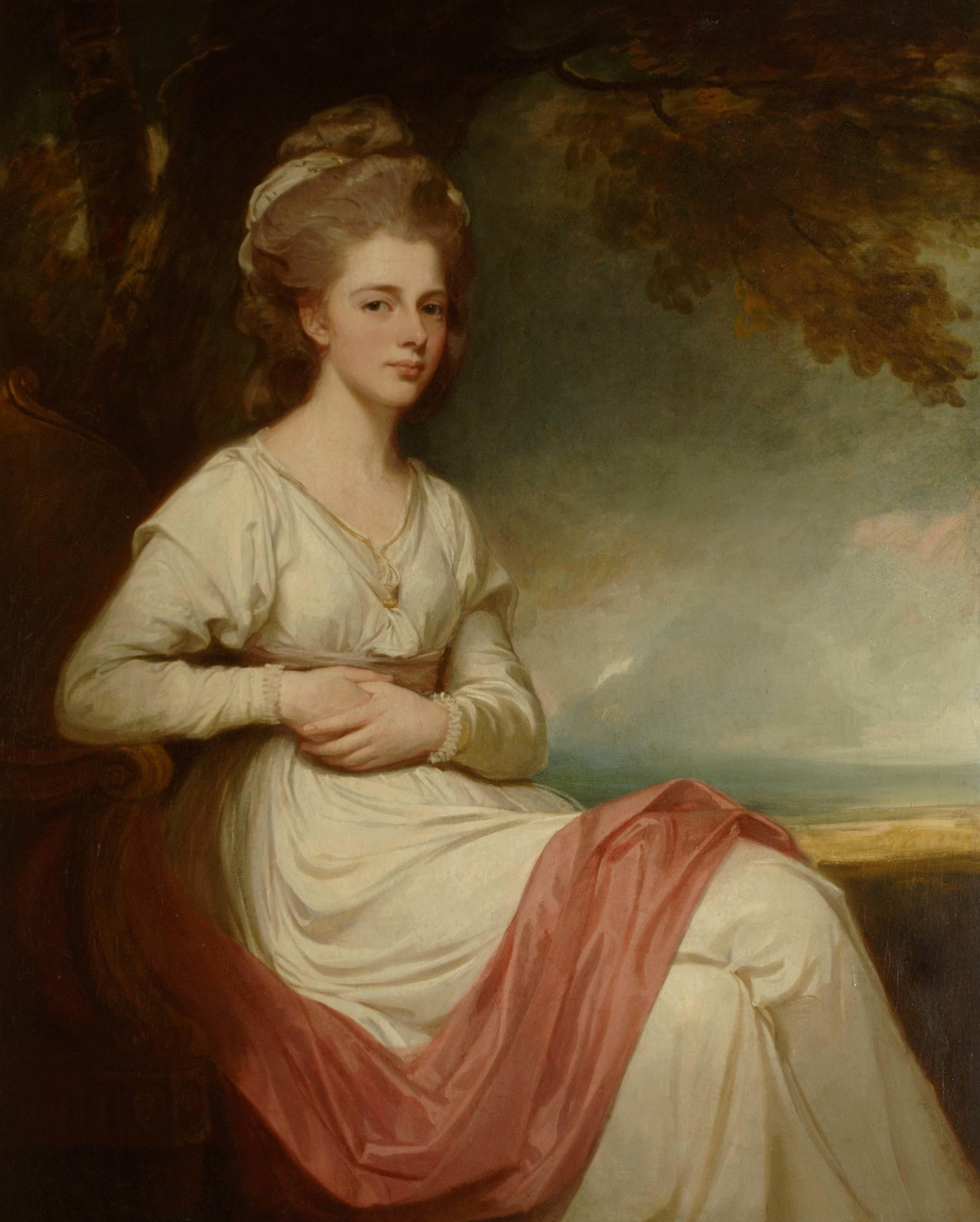
Portrait of his daughter, Anne Louisa Bertie, Lady Stuart (1747-1841) by George Romney, 1779-1780.

On 4 October 1736, Bertie was married to Anne Casey, the illegitimate daughter of Sir Cecil Wray, 11th Baronet. Together, they had two sons and two daughters. The sons died young; the two daughters, his heirs, were:

- Albinia Bertie (1737/8–1816), who married George Hobart, 3rd Earl of Buckinghamshire, a son of John Hobart, 1st Earl of Buckinghamshire by his second wife, Elizabeth Bristow.
- Anna Louisa Bertie (1747–1841), who married Lt.-Gen. Sir Charles Stuart, the fourth son of John Stuart, 3rd Earl of Bute and Mary Stuart, Countess of Bute.

Bertie died on 13 September 1768.

Parliament of Great Britain
Preceded by Albemarle Bertie; Richard Fydell	Member of Parliament for Boston; 1741–1754; With: John Michell	Succeeded by Lord Robert Bertie; Charles Amcotts
