= Philip Bertie =

English courtier and politician

Philip Bertie (c. 1665 – 15 April 1728) was an English courtier and politician, the third son of Robert Bertie, 3rd Earl of Lindsey.

Bertie was educated at Trinity College, Oxford, from which he took a BA in 1685, and trained a company of volunteers of foot from among the Oxford scholars to support James II during the Monmouth Rebellion. During the Glorious Revolution, however, he joined his uncle, the Earl of Danby, in raising support for William of Orange in the North of England.

By 1691, he had been appointed a Gentleman Usher of the Privy Chamber to Queen Mary, an office he held until her death in 1694. While he was passed over as Vice-Chamberlain of the Household in 1692 in favor of his elder brother Peregrine, he was appointed Auditor of the Duchy of Cornwall that year as a reward for his services.

In 1693, he considered entering a by-election for Clitheroe in Lancashire, where his brother Lord Willoughby was Chancellor of the Duchy of Lancaster, but ultimately declined, considering his interest there to be insufficient. The following year, on the advice of his uncle Peregrine, he stood for Stamford and was returned along with his uncle Charles.

In the House of Commons, he seems to have followed his family in becoming part of the Tory faction of his uncle Danby (now Duke of Leeds). Bertie opposed the attainder of Sir John Fenwick in 1697; however, he escaped dismissal from his auditorship when other members of the family were put out of office that year. He declined to stand for Stamford in 1698, the Berties having agreed with the other county family, the Cecils, henceforth to share the seat; his uncle Charles continued as MP. He may have been the "Bertie" who contested Liskeard that year, but stood fourth in the poll.

In 1699, he was successfully sued in the Court of King's Bench by Sir Philips Coote for having an affair with Coote's wife, Lady Elizabeth, the daughter of William Brabazon, 3rd Earl of Meath. He unsuccessfully contested Mitchell in December 1701, on the strength of his auditorship. In 1704, he was replaced as auditor by his brother Albemarle, a Whig.

Bertie's salary as a Gentleman Usher had been converted to a pension upon the death of Queen Mary, but he found it increasingly difficult to collect under the Whig administration, and was forced to appeal to Lord Oxford, the Treasurer, for assistance. During the same year, Bertie unsuccessfully contested a by-election at Boston to succeed his brother Peregrine.

While his appeal on petition to the elections committee of the House of Commons was upheld, the House held that the interference of his eldest brother, the Earl of Lindsey and Lord Lieutenant of Lincolnshire, had voided the election, and he again lost the subsequent by-election. Once more he petitioned; the committee declared neither elected, but the House upheld the election of his opponent, William Cotesworth.

Bertie married Lady Elizabeth, for some time the object of his affections, in 1711, but had no issue by her. Upon his death in 1728, he left an estate in Liverpool to his brother Albemarle, and lands in Lincolnshire and Somerset and an interest in Sir Cleave More's waterworks at Bootle to charity.

Political offices
Preceded by William Harbord	Auditor of the Duchy of Cornwall; 1692–1704	Succeeded by Albemarle Bertie
Parliament of England
Preceded by Charles Bertie; William Hyde	Member of Parliament for Stamford; 1694–1698; With: Charles Bertie	Succeeded by Charles Bertie; William Cecil
