= Robert Bertie, 1st Duke of Ancaster and Kesteven =

British statesman and nobleman

His Grace The Duke of Ancaster and Kesteven PC
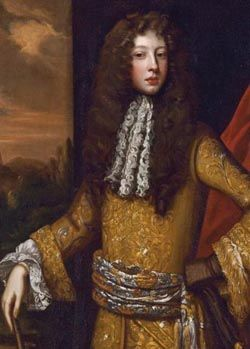
- Portrait of Lord Ancaster by Godfrey Kneller

Lord Great Chamberlain
- In office 1701–1723
- Preceded by: The Earl of Lindsey
- Succeeded by: The Duke of Ancaster and Kesteven

Chancellor of the Duchy of Lancaster
- In office 1689–1697
- Preceded by: Robert Phelips
- Succeeded by: The Earl of Stamford

Member of Parliament for Preston
- In office 1690–1690 Serving with Christopher Greenfield
- Preceded by: James Stanley; Thomas Patten
- Succeeded by: Christopher Greenfield; Sir Edward Chisenhall

Member of Parliament for Boston
- In office 1685–1690 Serving with Peregrine Bertie, Sir William Yorke
- Preceded by: Sir Anthony Irby; Sir William Yorke
- Succeeded by: Sir William Yorke; Peregrine Bertie

Personal details
- Born: Robert Bertie; 20 October 1660
- Died: 26 July 1723 (aged 62)
- Party: Tory
- Spouses: Mary Wynn (m. 1678; died 1689) Albinia Farington (m. 1705)
- Children: 10, including Peregrine, 2nd Duke of Ancaster and Kesteven
- Parent(s): Robert Bertie, 3rd Earl of Lindsey; Hon. Elizabeth Wharton
- Relatives: Peregrine Bertie (brother); Philip Bertie (brother); Albemarle Bertie (brother); Montagu Bertie, 2nd Earl of Lindsey (grandfather); Philip Wharton, 4th Baron Wharton (grandfather)

Robert Bertie, 1st Duke of Ancaster and Kesteven PC (20 October 1660 – 26 July 1723), styled 17th Baron Willoughby de Eresby between 1666 and 1701, and known as 4th Earl of Lindsey between 1701 and 1706, and as 1st Marquess of Lindsey between 1706 and 1715, was a British statesman and nobleman.

== Early life ==
Bertie was the eldest son of Robert Bertie, 3rd Earl of Lindsey and, his second wife, the Hon. Elizabeth Wharton, daughter of Philip Wharton, 4th Baron Wharton. Among his younger brothers were Hon. Peregrine Bertie (the Vice Chamberlain to King William III and to Queen Anne, Teller of the Exchequer), Hon. Philip Bertie (Auditor of the Duchy of Cornwall, who married Lady Elizabeth Brabazon, eldest daughter of William Brabazon, 3rd Earl of Meath), Hon. Norris Bertie (a Lt. of the Royal Navy), and Hon. Albemarle Bertie (MP who also served as Auditor of the Duchy of Cornwall. Among his sisters were Lady Jane Bertie (wife of Maj.-Gen. Edward Mathew, Governor of Grenada), Lady Caroline Bertie (second wife of Capt. George Dewar). From his father's first marriage to Mary (née Massingberd) Berkeley (widow of Hon. George Berkeley and second daughter John Massingberd, Treasurer of the East India Company), he had an elder half-sister, Lady Arabella Bertie (second wife Thomas Savage, 3rd Earl Rivers).

His paternal grandparents were Montagu Bertie, 2nd Earl of Lindsey, and the former Martha Cokayne. Among his large extended family were uncles Peregrine, Richard, Vere, and Charles Bertie, and aunts Lady Elizabeth (wife of the 3rd Viscount Campden) and Lady Bridget (wife of the 1st Duke of Leeds). His mother was the only child of Philip Wharton, 4th Baron Wharton and the former Elizabeth Wandesford (daughter of Sir Rowland Wandesford of Pickhill, an attorney of the Court of Wards and Liveries).

== Career ==
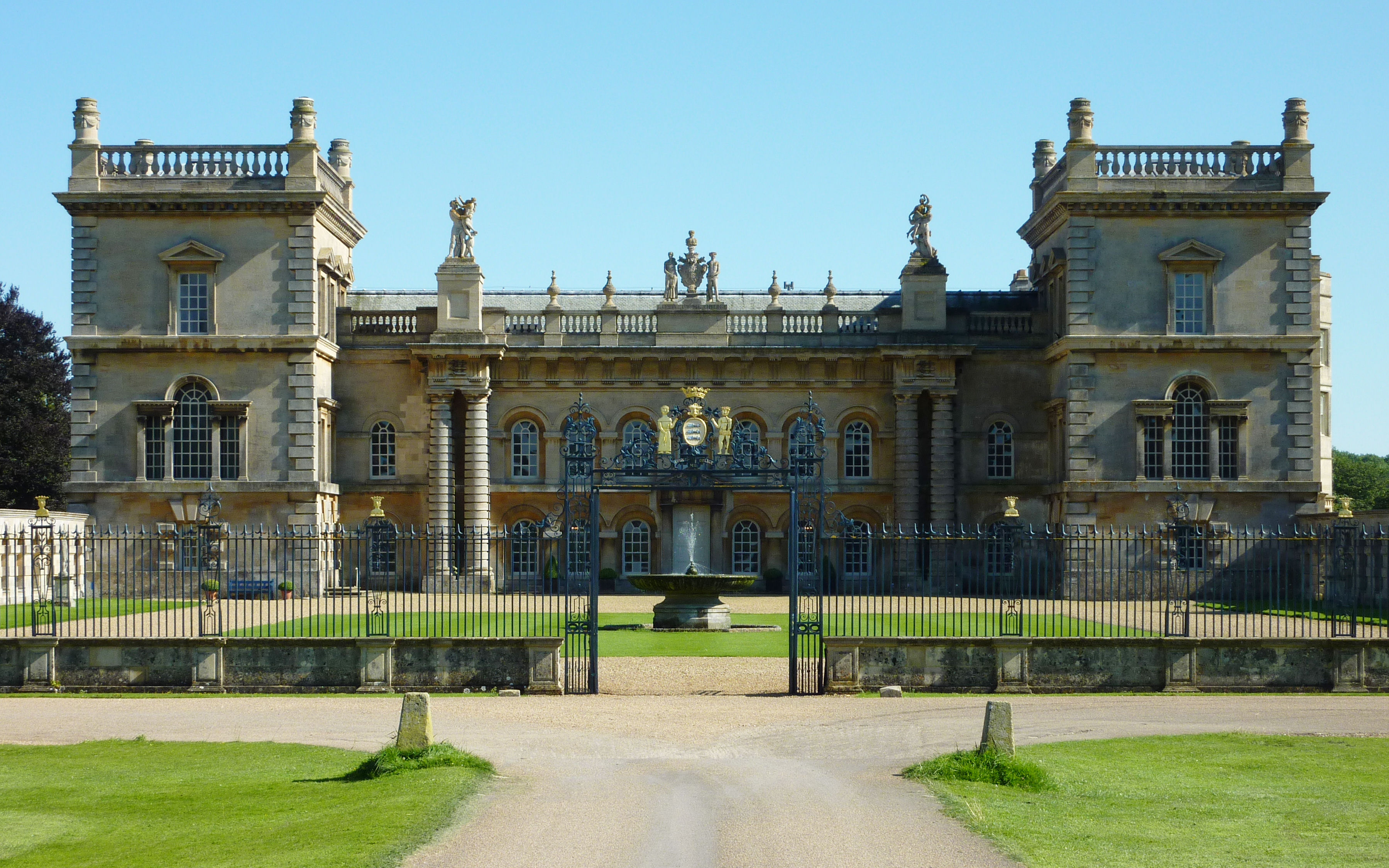
Grimsthorpe Castle, Lincolnshire

Lord Willoughby entered Parliament as Member of Parliament for Boston in 1685, and sat in the Loyal Parliament, from 1685 to 1687, and the Convention Parliament from 1689 to 1690. He was commissioned captain of an independent troop of horse raised to suppress the Monmouth Rebellion on 20 June 1685. In 1688, Bertie took part in the northern rising led by his kinsman, the Earl of Danby, in favour of William of Orange. He was rewarded with the chancellorship of the Duchy of Lancaster in 1689, a post which enabled him to secure a seat at Preston at the general election of 1690.

In 1690, he was returned for Preston, but was soon forced to leave the House of Commons for the House of Lords after receiving a writ of acceleration as Baron Willoughby de Eresby. Lord Willougby inherited the earldom of Lindsey on his father's death in 1701, and was invested a Privy Counsellor one month later; along with the Earldom of Lindsey, he also inherited the offices of Lord Great Chamberlain and Lord Lieutenant of Lincolnshire, both of which he would hold until his death and would pass onto his son, the 2nd Duke of Ancaster and Kesteven.

Lord Lindsey, as he was now styled, was then created Marquess of Lindsey in 1706, and was finally created Duke of Ancaster and Kesteven in 1715, with a special remainder failing the heirs male of his body, to the heirs male of the body of his father, Robert, late Earl of Lindsey, by Elizabeth his wife, daughter of Philip, Lord Wharton. Also in 1715, he temporarily served as a Lord Justice.

In 1715, he employed Sir John Vanbrugh to design a baroque front to his house at Grimsthorpe to celebrate his ennoblement as first Duke of Ancaster and Kesteven. This was in addition to the London mansion, Lindsey House, at 59-60 Lincoln's Inn Fields, built for the Bertie family in 1640.

== Personal life ==
On 30 July 1678, Lord Willoughby married Mary Wynn (d. 1689), a Welsh heiress and direct descendant of the princely house of Aberffraw. She was the daughter, and sole heiress, of Sir Richard Wynn, 4th Baronet of Gwydyr Estate and the former Sarah Myddelton (daughter of Sir Thomas Myddelton of Chirk Castle). They had five children, including:

- Robert Bertie, Lord Willoughby (1683–1704), who died while studying at the Wolfenbüttel Ritter-Akademie
- Peregrine Bertie, 2nd Duke of Ancaster and Kesteven (1686–1742), who married Jane Brownlow, third daughter of Sir John Brownlow, 3rd Baronet.
- Lady Elizabeth Bertie, who died unmarried.
- Lady Eleanor Bertie, who died unmarried.
- Lady Mary Bertie, who died unmarried.

After the death of his first wife in 1689, he married Albinia Farington on 6 July 1705. She was a daughter of Maj.-Gen. William Farington of Chislehurst and the former Theodosia Betenson (sister and co-heiress of Sir Edward Betenson, 1st Baronet). Together, they were the parents of:

- Lord Vere Bertie (d. 1768), an MP for Boston who married Ann Casey, illegitimate daughter of Sir Cecil Wray, 11th Baronet, in 1736.
- Capt. Lord Montagu Bertie (d. 1753), who married Elizabeth Piers, daughter of William Piers, MP in 1758.
- Capt. Lord Thomas Bertie (1720–1749)
- Lt.-Gen. Lord Robert Bertie (1721–1782), the Governor of Cork who married Hon. Mary (née Blundell) Raymond, widow of Robert Raymond, 2nd Baron Raymond and third daughter of Montague Blundell, 1st Viscount Blundell, in 1762.
- Lady Louisa Bertie, who married Thomas Bludworth, Gentleman of the Horse to the Prince of Wales and a Groom of the Bedchamber, in 1736.

Lord Ancaster died in July 1723, aged 62, an established but relatively unheralded statesman. He was succeeded by his eldest surviving son, Peregrine. His widow remarried to James Douglas and died in 1745.

=== Descendants ===
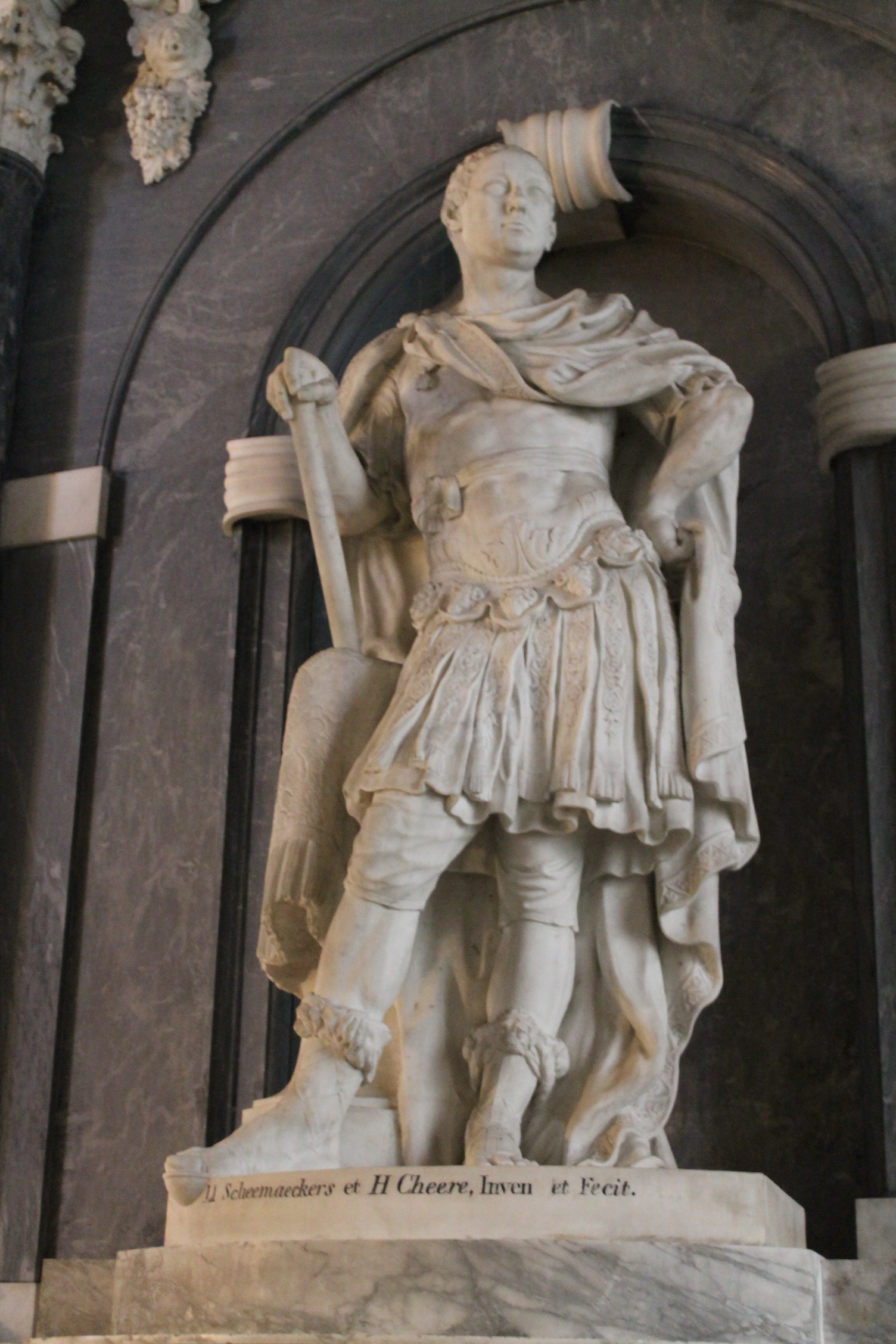
Funerary monument in Edenham Church by Henry Scheemakers and Henry Cheere

Through his son Lord Vere, he was a grandfather of Albinia Bertie (wife of George Hobart, 3rd Earl of Buckinghamshire) and Louisa Bertie (wife of Lt.-Gen. Hon. Sir Charles Stuart, Governor of Minorca and fourth son of John Stuart, 3rd Earl of Bute).

Through his son Lord Montagu, he was a grandfather of Augusta Bertie, who married John Fane, 9th Earl of Westmorland.

Parliament of England
Preceded by Sir Anthony Irby; Sir William Yorke	Member of Parliament for Boston; 1685–1690; With: Peregrine Bertie 1689–1690; Sir William Yorke 1690	Succeeded by Sir William Yorke; Peregrine Bertie
Preceded by James Stanley; Thomas Patten	Member of Parliament for Preston; 1690; With: Christopher Greenfield	Succeeded by Christopher Greenfield; Sir Edward Chisenhall
Political offices
Preceded by Robert Phelips	Chancellor of the Duchy of Lancaster; 1689–1697	Succeeded by The Earl of Stamford
Preceded by The Earl of Lindsey	Lord Great Chamberlain; 1701–1723	Succeeded by The Duke of Ancaster and Kesteven
Honorary titles
Preceded by The Earl of Lindsey	Lord Lieutenant of Lincolnshire; 1700–1723	Succeeded by The Duke of Ancaster and Kesteven
Peerage of Great Britain
New creation	Duke of Ancaster and Kesteven; 1715–1723	Succeeded by Peregrine Bertie
Peerage of England
New creation	Marquess of Lindsey; 1706–1723	Succeeded by Peregrine Bertie
Preceded by Robert Bertie	Earl of Lindsey; 1701–1723	Succeeded by Peregrine Bertie
Preceded by Robert Bertie	Baron Willoughby de Eresby (writ in acceleration) (descended by acceleration); 1690–1715	Succeeded by Peregrine Bertie
