= Charles Wallop =

British politician

Charles Wallop (12 December 1722 – 11 August 1771) was a British politician.

The third son of John Wallop, 1st Earl of Portsmouth, Charles was educated at Winchester School from 1732 to 1739 and at Corpus Christi College, Cambridge from 1740 to 1743. In the 1747 election, his father had him returned for Whitchurch, where his family had acquired an electoral interest when his eldest brother married the daughter of John Conduitt. He supported Henry Pelham's government, but did not stand again in 1754. Wallop died unmarried in 1771 in Hackney.

Parliament of Great Britain
Preceded by John Selwyn; Thomas Wentworth	Member of Parliament for Whitchurch; 1747–1754; With: John Selwyn 1747–1751; Lord Robert Bertie 1751–1754	Succeeded by William Powlett; Thomas Townshend
