= Edmund Boulter =

Edmund Boulter (abt 1635 – 1709), was a London merchant and politician. He was the eldest son of John Boulter, a maltster, twice mayor of Abingdon and his wife born Susannah Cutler, sister of Sir John Cutler, 1st Baronet, later Edmund's business partner.

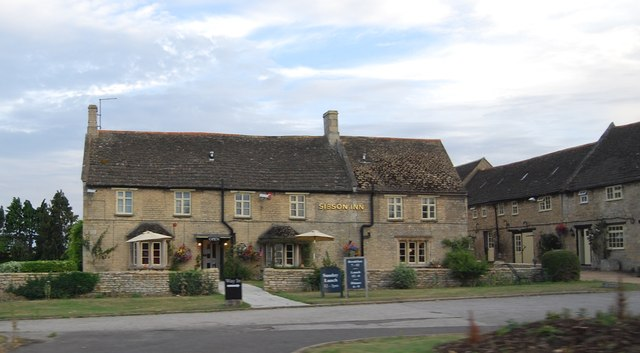
Great North Road Sibson Cambridgeshire milestone and mounting block engraved EB 1708

== Family ==
Growing up during the interregnum Boulter seems to have been by choice a Dissenter or Presbyterian. He was apprenticed to the Haberdashers' Company 23 July 1647 when he may have been as young as twelve. His father died young and Boulter helped educate his siblings and, later, their children. His brother Robert, a Cornhill stationer, and substantial supplier of books to Massachusetts was one of the original publishers of Milton's Paradise Lost.

== Career ==
Boulter was a successful businessman to the extent that though a Haberdasher he was courted at length by the Worshipful Company of Grocers to join their company his trade with them being so extensive.

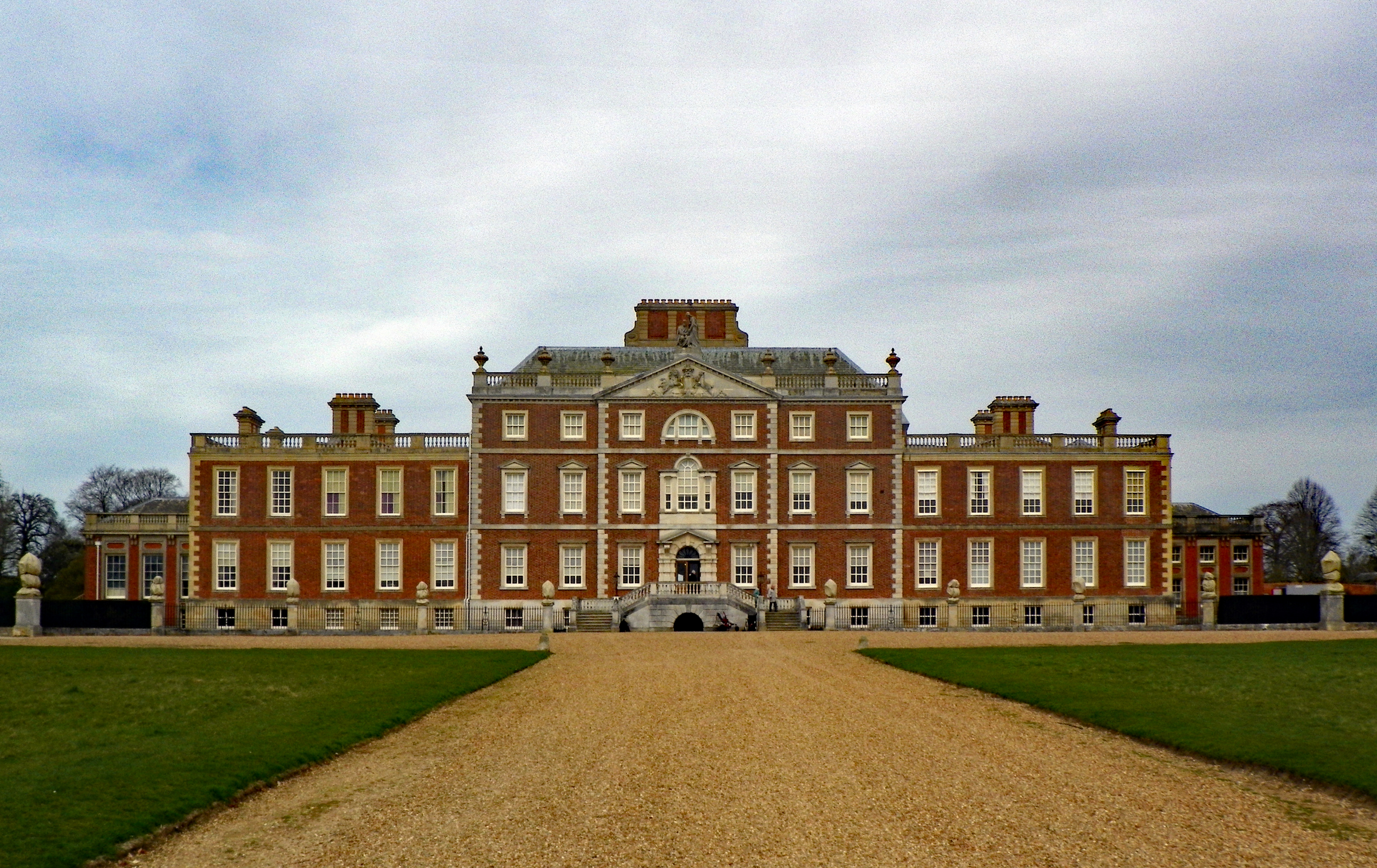
Wimpole Hall, Cambridgeshire

Edmund Boulter was elected to the City of London Lieutenancy in 1690, 1694, 1704 and 1708. He was also chosen Sheriff of London in July 1694 but paid a fine to be released from the obligation.

His uncle and sometime business partner, Sir John Cutler, Bt, died in 1693 and less than four years later Sir John's daughter, Elizabeth, Countess of Radnor, died without leaving children so that the property in her marriage settlement reverted to Boulter. He now had two extra landed estates to manage, Wimpole Hall in Cambridgeshire and Gawthorpe Hall at Harewood near Leeds in Yorkshire. Obliged to ride the Great North Road regularly and now aged near three score years and ten he set up convenient re-mounting posts between Leeds and Cambridge. Here is a report on them made a century later "From Stilton to Grantham at convenient distances, are stones with three steps, placed there by a Mr Boulter, for the easy mounting of his horse, he being a very corpulent man, and traveling this road every week for many years; on each stone was engraved E.B. 1708, several of which are now defaced."

== House of Commons ==
In 1698 Boulter was elected Member of Parliament for the parliamentary borough of Boston, Lincolnshire, having business of long standing there. This may have been designed to defuse the effect of a claim of parliamentary privilege by his cousin's widower, the Earl of Radnor, by acquiring similar privilege. Boulter did not stand again.

== Death ==
"Mr. Boulter, a grocer of the citty, and executor of the late Sir John Cutler, is dead, worth 150,000 L. [i.e. £150,000], 'tis said, and has left 2000 L. per ann. to Mr. Boulter, a relation of him in Yorkshire, and 2000 L. per ann. more to his nephew, Mr. Fryor, (Note: Sir John Fryer, Baronet (1671 – 1726) lord mayor of London 1720, built Wherwell Priory) a pewterer in Gracechurch street".

Edmund Boulter died 15 February 1708/1709 and was buried nine days later in the south chancel of St Christopher le Stocks, Threadneedle Street, London.

Aside from the reverted properties of Wimpole, Gawthorpe and Harewood, where Sir John Cutler had lived for a time in the castle, Boulter owned Little Haseley Oxfordshire, estates in Lincolnshire, the manor of Deptford near London, and estates in Hampshire Wherwell and Goodworth Clatford acquired in 1695 from Lord de la Warr, property in Kent and London and in Somerset.

== Boulter Exhibition, Pembroke College, Oxford ==
In 1736 his nephew of the same name died at Avignon where he had taken his daughter for the benefit of her health. "Edmund Boulter (1678-1736), of Harewood, Yorks, and Hasely Court, Oxon, left to the College £20 yearly for a Scholarship, to be called the Cutler-Boulter Scholarship, in honour of his [great-]uncle, Sir John Cutler. This is the millionaire, the opening of whose will on 20 April 1693 excited so much interest (see Luttrell's Brief Relation, iii. 81, and Wood's Life and Times, iii. 409, 420). In it were bequeathed lands worth £6000 a year to the testator's daughter, the Countess of Radnor, and her issue, and failing such issue to Sir John's nephew, Mr. Boulter, who also inherited half the personal estate, about £300,000, and was executor of the will."

Distinguished exhibitioners include Oswald Lewis, Thomas Smith, Richard Sorabji.

== Cutler Boulter Almshouses ==
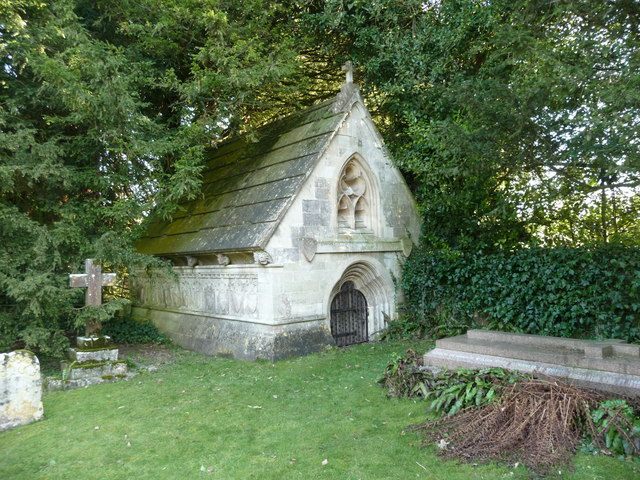
Wherwell crypt for John Fryer's descendants

The younger Edmund Boulter also left money to found the Cutler Boulter Almshouses in St Clement's, then just outside Oxford. The site included accommodation for an apothecary who was employed to provide free medical advice and care to poor residents of Oxford. The almshouses and apothecary's house were demolished in the 1880s but the money from the sale of the land was used to set up the Cutler Boulter Provident Dispensary which operated from 1884 to 1950.

== Notes ==
Parliament of England
| Preceded by Peregrine Bertie; Sir William Yorke | Member of Parliament for Boston; 1698-1701; With: Richard Wynn | Succeeded by Sir William Yorke; Peregrine Bertie |
