= Peregrine Bertie, 2nd Duke of Ancaster and Kesteven =

British politician

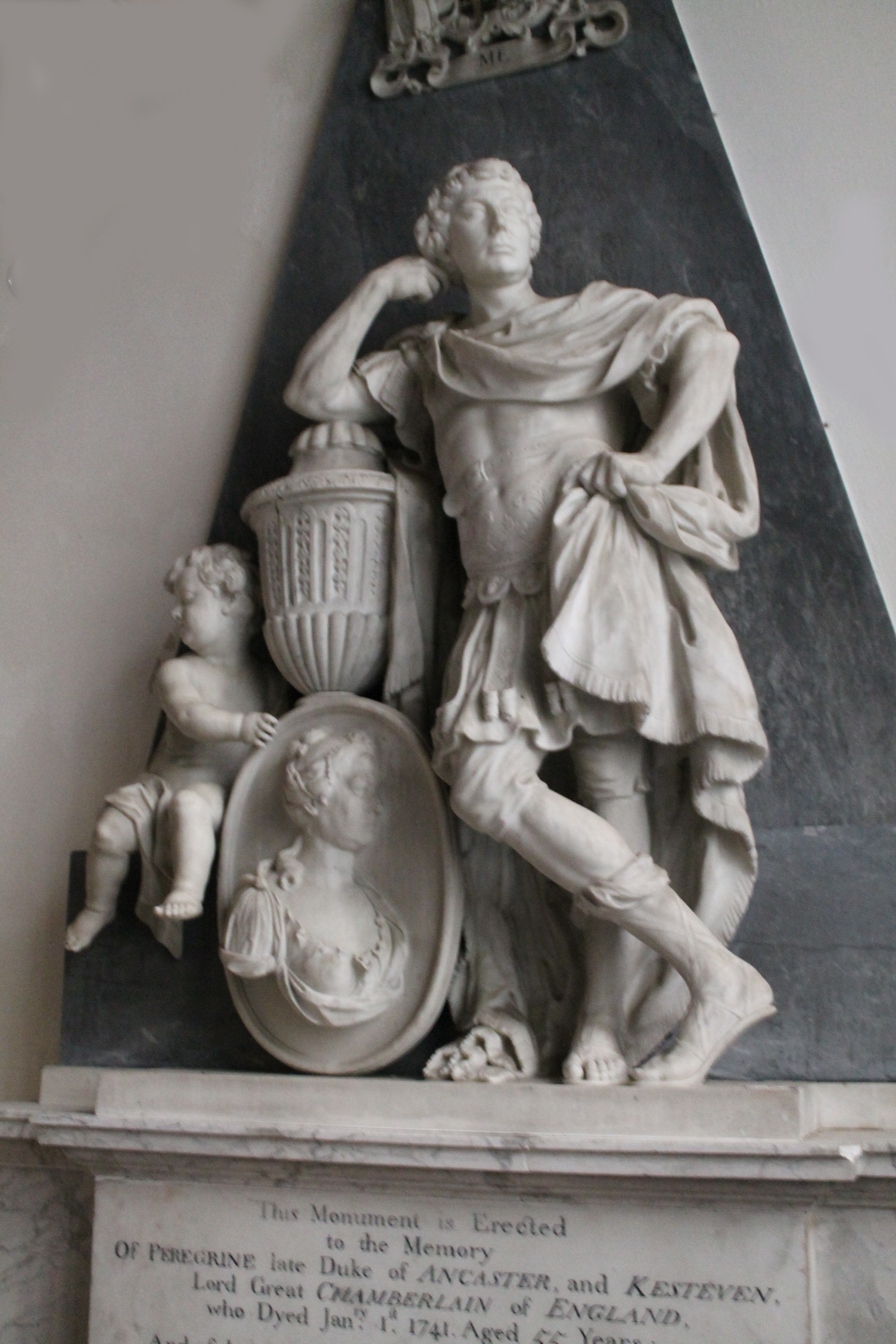
Memorial to Peregrine Bertie in Edenham church

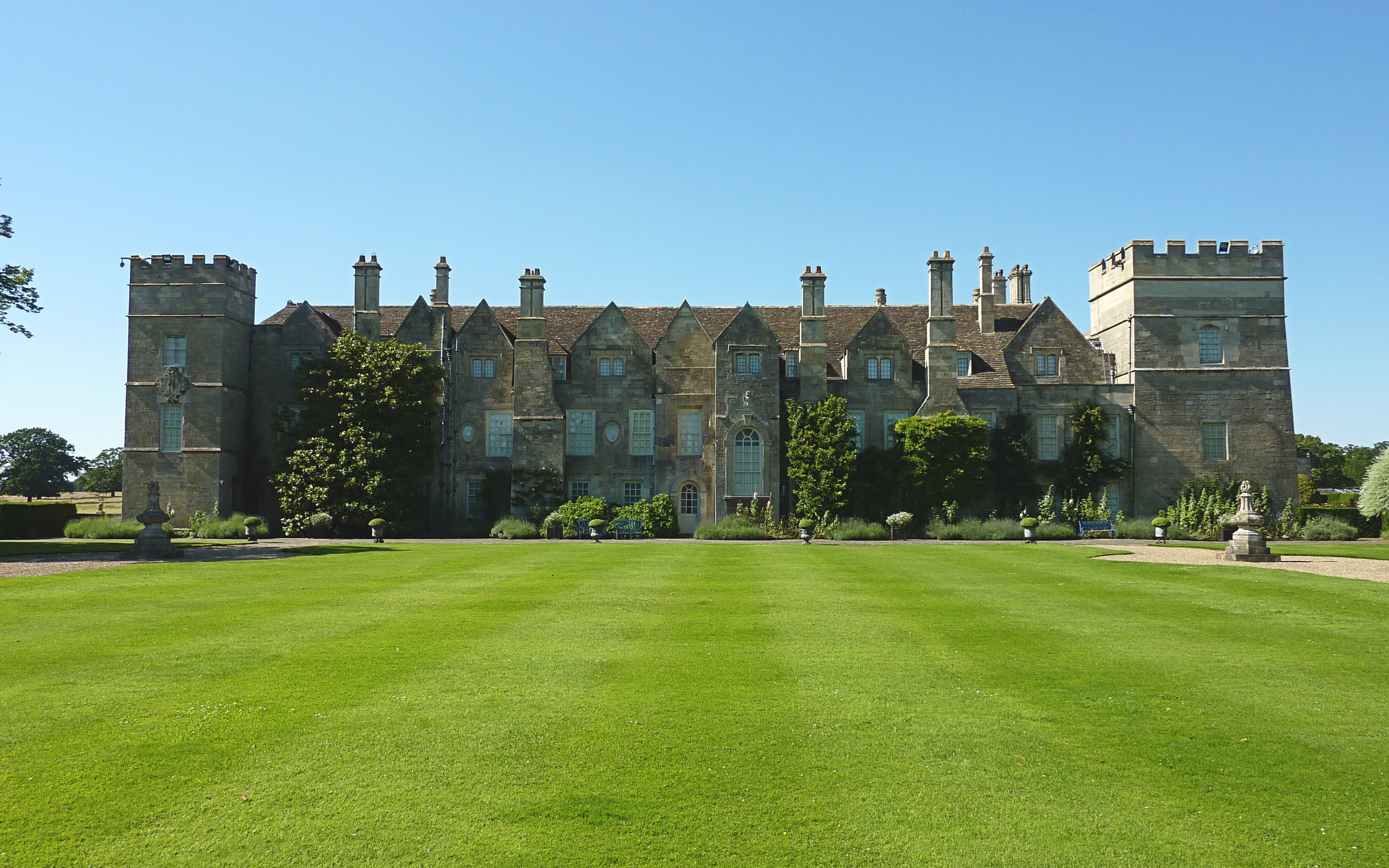
Grimsthorpe Castle

Peregrine Bertie, 2nd Duke of Ancaster and Kesteven PC (29 April 1686 – 1 January 1742), styled The Honourable Peregrine Bertie between 1686 and 1704, Lord Willoughby de Eresby between 1704 and 1715 and Marquess of Lindsey between 1715 and 1723, was a British politician who sat in the House of Commons from 1708 until 1715 when he was called to the House of Lords.

== Early life ==
Bertie was the second and eldest surviving son of Robert Bertie, Lord Willoughby de Eresby (subsequently 4th Earl of Lindsey) and his first wife Mary Wynn, daughter of Sir Richard Wynn, 4th Baronet. He became Lord Willoughby and heir to other titles on the death of his elder brother in 1704.

== Career ==
At the 1708 British general election Lord Willoughby was returned as a Member of Parliament for Lincolnshire with his father's support. Although his father was a Whig, Willoughby acted as a Tory. He sat on a drafting committee for the Boston church bill, and a committee of inquiry into the laws excluding placemen. He acted against the Whigs in an electoral dispute. Although nominated to the committee examining the arrangements for the trial of Dr Sacheverell, he voted against the impeachment in 1710. He was returned as a Tory at the 1710 election and listed as one of the 'worthy patriots' who detected the mismanagements of the previous administration, and a 'Tory patriot' who opposed the continuation of the war in 1711. He was also a member of the October Club. He sat on drafting committees for bills to build a waterworks near Boston and to help drain the Ancholme Level. As a Hanoverian Tory, he voted against the expulsion of Richard Steele in March 1714. He did not stand at the 1715 general election but was summoned to the House of Lords by a writ of acceleration in his father's Barony of Willoughby de Eresby on 16 March 1715.

He was a Gentleman of the Bedchamber to George I from 1719 to 1727. In 1723, on the death of his father, he inherited the rest of the family titles, and the hereditary Great Office of Lord Great Chamberlain. He also inherited the Lincolnshire seats at Grimsthorpe Castle and Eresby, and the London mansion, Lindsey House, at 59-60 Lincoln's Inn Fields. He was appointed Lord Lieutenant of Lincolnshire in succession to his father in 1724. He was receiver of the Duchy of Lancaster rents in Lincolnshire from 1728 to his death, and Lord Warden and Chief Justice in Eyre north of the Trent from 1734 to his death. He had a seat on the Foundling Hospital's board of governors when the charity was founded in 1739.

== Personal life ==
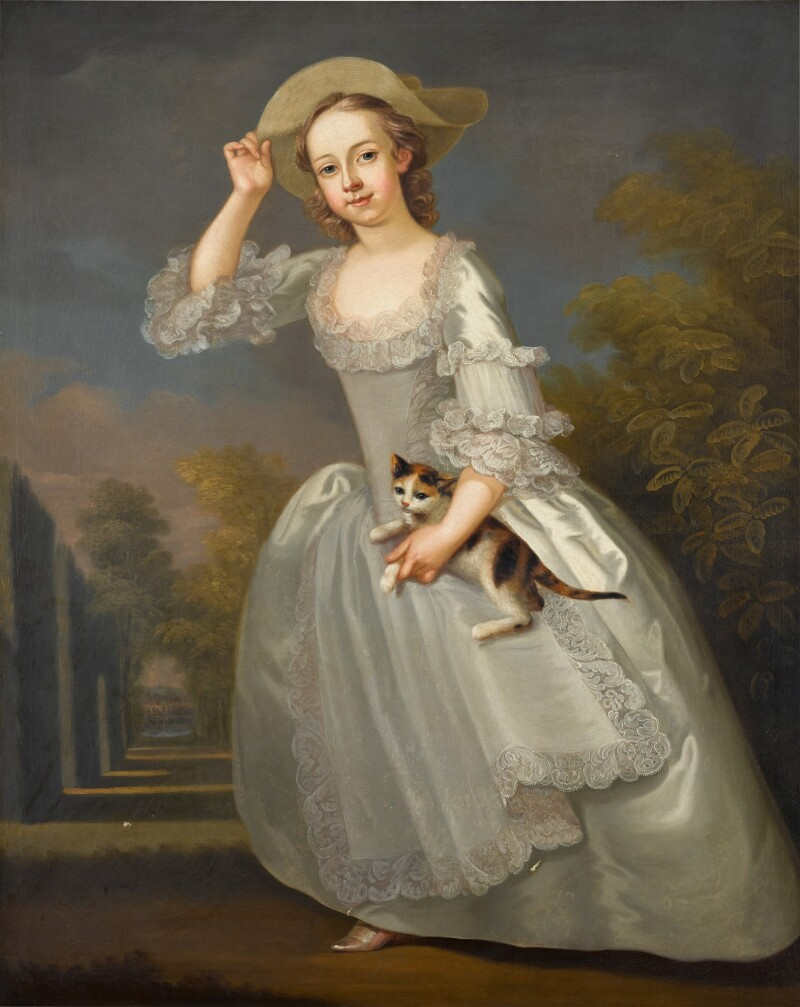
George Knapton, Portrait of Jane Bertie, daughter of the 2nd Duke of Ancaster

Lord Willougby married Jane Brownlow, daughter of Sir John Brownlow, 3rd Baronet in June 1711. Together, they were the parents of seven children:

- Peregrine Bertie, 3rd Duke of Ancaster and Kesteven (1714–1778)
- Lord Albemarle Bertie (d. 1765), a gambler and sportsman depicted by Hogarth who was blinded early in his youth.
- Brownlow Bertie, 5th Duke of Ancaster and Kesteven (1729–1809)
- Lady Mary Bertie (d. 1774), who married Samuel Greatheed in 1747.
- Lady Albinia Bertie (d. 1754), who married Francis Beckford, in 1744.
- Lady Jane Bertie (d. 1793), who married General Edward Mathew in 1743.
- Lady Caroline Bertie (d. 1744), who married George Dewar.

The Duchess died on 25 August 1736. The Duke of Ancaster died on 1 January 1742.

=== Descendants ===
His second son, Lord Albemarle, was the natural father of Admiral Sir Albemarle Bertie (1755–1824), who was created a baronet of the Navy in 1812.

=== Ancestry ===
Ancestors of Peregrine Bertie, 2nd Duke of Ancaster and Kesteven

8. Montagu Bertie, 2nd Earl of Lindsey
4. Robert Bertie, 3rd Earl of Lindsey
9. Martha Cockayne
2. Robert Bertie, 1st Duke of Ancaster and Kesteven
10. Philip Wharton, 4th Baron Wharton
5. Hon. Elizabeth Wharton
11. Elizabeth Wandesford
1. Peregrine Bertie, 2nd Duke of Ancaster and Kesteven
12. Sir Owen Wynn, 3rd Baronet
6. Sir Richard Wynn, 4th Baronet
13. Grace Williams
3. Mary Wynn
14. Thomas Myddelton (younger)
7. Sarah Myddelton
15. Mary Napier

Political offices
Preceded by The Duke of Ancaster and Kesteven	Lord Great Chamberlain; 1723–1742	Succeeded by The Duke of Ancaster and Kesteven
Parliament of Great Britain
Preceded by Albemarle Bertie; George Whichcot	Member of Parliament for Lincolnshire; 1708–1715; With: George Whichcot 1708–1710; Lewis Dymoke 1710–1713; Sir Willoughby Hickman 1713–1715	Succeeded by Sir Willoughby Hickman; Sir John Brownlow
Honorary titles
Preceded by Lord Edward Russell	Custos Rotulorum of Caernarvonshire; 1714–1739	Succeeded by Sir William Yonge, Bt
Preceded by The Duke of Ancaster and Kesteven	Lord Lieutenant of Lincolnshire; 1724–1742	Succeeded by The Duke of Ancaster and Kesteven
Legal offices
Preceded by The Viscount Lymington	Justice in Eyre north of the Trent; 1734–1742	Succeeded by The Earl of Cardigan
Peerage of Great Britain
Preceded by Robert Bertie	Duke of Ancaster and Kesteven; 1723–1742	Succeeded by Peregrine Bertie
Peerage of England
Preceded by Robert Bertie	Baron Willoughby de Eresby (writ in acceleration); 1715–1742	Succeeded by Peregrine Bertie
