= Lord Robert Bertie =

British Army officer and politician

General Lord Robert Bertie
- Born: 14 November 1721
- Died: 10 March 1782 (aged 60)
- Military career
- Allegiance: Kingdom of Great Britain
- Branch: British Army
- Rank: General
- Other work: Member of Parliament

General Lord Robert Bertie (14 November 1721 – 10 March 1782) was a senior British Army officer and politician who sat in the House of Commons from 1751 to 1782.

== Early life ==
Bertie was the fifth son of Robert Bertie, 1st Duke of Ancaster and the third son by the Duke's second wife Albinia Farrington and was educated at Eton College in 1728. In 1745 he inherited his mother's estate at Chislehurst.

== Military career ==
Bertie joined the Coldstream Guards as an ensign in 1737, and was promoted to lieutenant in 1741 and captain in 1744. He was granted brevet rank as colonel in 1752, major-general in 1758, lieutenant-general in 1760 and general in 1777.

He was Regimental Colonel of the 7th Regiment of Foot from 1754 to 1776, and of the 2nd Troop of Horse Guards from 1776 to 1782. Bertie also commanded a regiment of fusiliers which filled billets to Admiral John Byng's fleet in 1756, then short of men. Bertie later defended the admiral at Byng's court-martial. He was Governor of Cork from 1762 to 1768 and Governor of Duncannon from 1768 to 1782.

== Later career ==
Bertie was a Lord of the Bedchamber to the Prince of Wales, later King George III, from 1751 until his death. He sat in Parliament for Whitchurch from 1751 to 1754 and for Boston from 1754 to 1782.

Bertie died in 1782. In 1762 he had married Mary, widow of Robert Raymond, 2nd Baron Raymond and daughter of Montague Blundell, 1st Viscount Blundell; they had no children.

== Sources ==
- Mary M. Drummond, BERTIE, Lord Robert (1721-82), of Chislehurst, Kent in The History of Parliament: the House of Commons 1754-1790 (1964). Online version Retrieved 25 August 2012.

Military offices
Preceded by John Mostyn	Colonel of the 7th Regiment of Foot (Royal Fuzileers); 1754–1776	Succeeded by Richard Prescott
Preceded by The Lord Cadogan	Colonel of the 2nd Troop of Horse Guards; 1776–1782	Succeeded by The Lord Amherst
Parliament of Great Britain
Preceded by John Selwyn, junior Charles Wallop	Member of Parliament for Whitchurch; 1751–1754; With: Charles Wallop	Succeeded by William Powlett; Thomas Townshend
Preceded by Lord Vere Bertie; John Michell	Member of Parliament for Boston; 1754–1782; With: Charles Amcotts 1754-1761; John Michell 1761-1766; Charles Amcotts 1766-1777; Humphrey Sibthorp 1777-1782	Succeeded by Sir Peter Burrell; Humphrey Sibthorp
