= Albemarle Bertie (MP) =

English politician

Albemarle Bertie (c. 1668–1742), of Swinstead, Lincolnshire, was an English Whig politician who sat in the English and British House of Commons between 1705 and 1741.

The fifth son of Robert Bertie, 3rd Earl of Lindsey and his wife Elizabeth Wharton, he successfully contested Lincolnshire for the Whigs at the 1705 English general election. At the 1708 British general election, he stood down at Lincolnshire to make way for his nephew, Lord Willoughby de Eresby and was returned instead for Cockermouth on the interest of his uncle, the 1st Earl of Wharton. He was probably the candidate put up by the Wharton interest at Appleby at the 1710 British general election, who withdrew before the poll expressing a desire to sit no longer in Parliament.

Bertie stood for Lincolnshire again at a by-election in 1721, but was defeated. At the 1734 British general election, he was returned for Boston by his nephew, now the 2nd Duke of Ancaster and Kesteven, but stood down again at the 1741 British general election and died the following year.

Parliament of England
Preceded by Sir John Thorold; Lewis Dymoke	Member of Parliament for Lincolnshire; 1705–1707; With: George Whichcot	Succeeded by Parliament of Great Britain
Parliament of Great Britain
Preceded by Parliament of England	Member of Parliament for Lincolnshire; 1707–1708; With: George Whichcot	Succeeded by George Whichcot; Lord Willoughby de Eresby
Preceded by Thomas Lamplugh; James Stanhope	Member of Parliament for Cockermouth; 1708–1710; With: James Stanhope	Succeeded by James Stanhope; Nicholas Lechmere
Preceded by Richard Ellys; The Lord Coleraine	Member of Parliament for Boston; 1734–1741; With: Richard Fydell	Succeeded by Lord Vere Bertie; John Michell
Political offices
Preceded by Philip Bertie	Auditor of the Duchy of Cornwall; 1704 – aft. 1723	Unknown
