= Sir John Cutler, 1st Baronet =

English grocer, financier and Member of Parliament

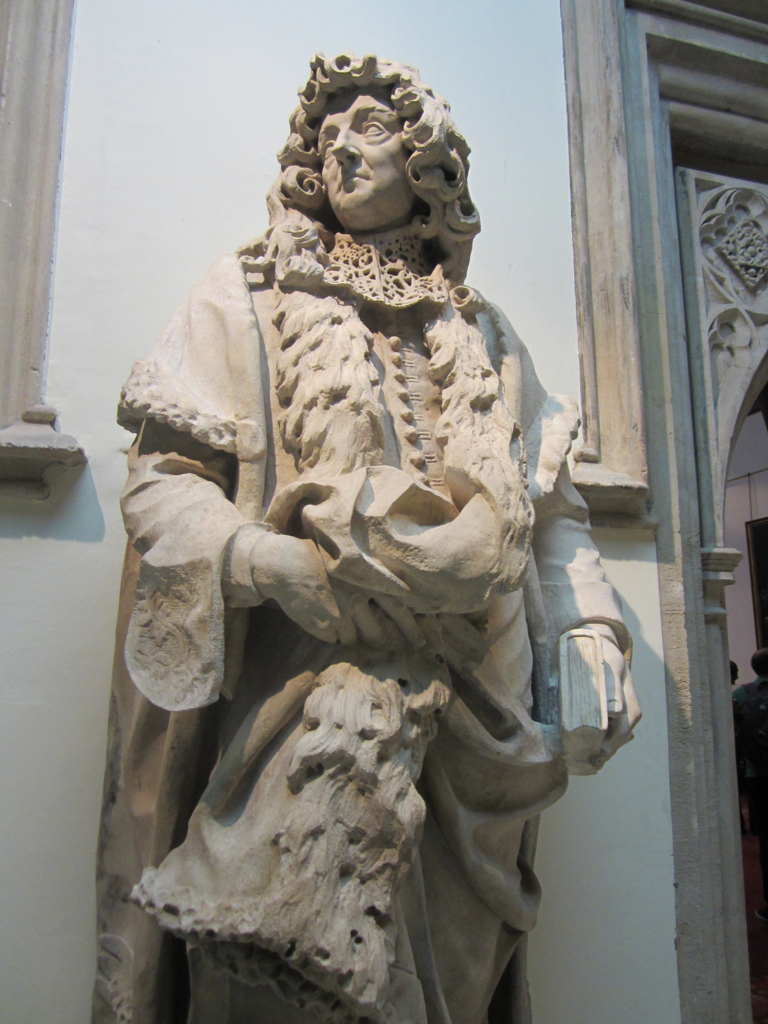
Sir John Cutler, 1683 The Guildhall, London

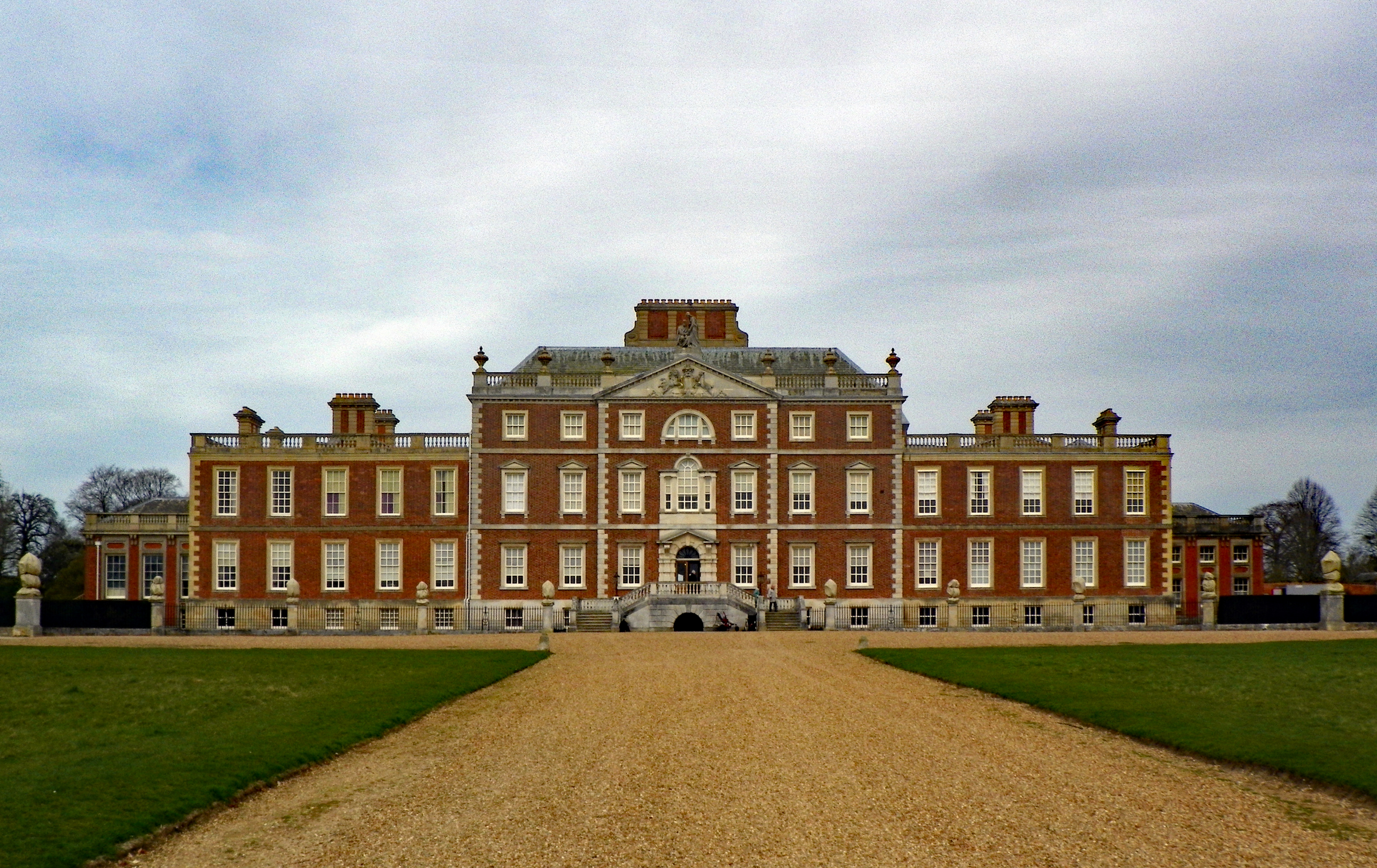
Wimpole Hall, Cambridgeshire

Sir John Cutler, 1st Baronet (1603–1693) was an English grocer, financier and Member of Parliament.

He was the 2nd son of Edward Cutler, Salter, of London. He became a successful grocer who also participated in land speculation, acquiring the combined Gawthorpe and Harewood Castle estates in Yorkshire in 1656. He was knighted in 1660 and created a baronet (of London) later the same year. He was Master of the Worshipful Company of Grocers of the City of London four times and became a councilman and alderman of the city of London. He paid for much of the rebuilding of Grocers' Hall after the Great Fire of London of 1666.

He was elected a Fellow of the Royal Society in 1664.

He served as High Sheriff of Kent in 1676. He was Member of Parliament for Taunton 1679–80 and for Bodmin 1689–93. He was Treasurer for the building of St Paul's Cathedral.

Late in life he bought Wimpole Hall estate in Cambridgeshire from Thomas Chicheley.

He died in 1693 and was buried at St Margaret's, Westminster. He had married twice; firstly in 1642, Elizabeth, the daughter and coheiress of Sir Thomas Foote, 1st Baronet, Lord Mayor of London and secondly in 1669, Elicia, the daughter of Sir Thomas Tipping of Wheatfield, Oxfordshire. The Baronetcy became extinct on his death and his estate passed to his only surviving daughter Elizabeth who married Charles Robartes, 2nd Earl of Radnor. On Elizabeth's death with no children the estate reverted to her cousins the Boulter family, in particular Edmund Boulter.

Baronetage of the United Kingdom
New creation	Baronet (of London); 1660–1693	Extinct
