= Thomas Smith (barrister) =

British lawyer, soldier and academic (1915–1988)

Sir Thomas Broun Smith QC FBA FRSE (3 December 1915 – 15 October 1988) was a British lawyer, soldier and academic.

== Life ==
Smith was the son of John Smith, DL, JP, of Glasgow (1885–1954) and his wife, Agnes McFarlane. He was educated at Glasgow High School and Sedbergh School in Yorkshire.

Smith studied law at Christ Church, Oxford, (MA 1937, Boulter exhibitioner, Eldon Scholar). He was called to the English Bar by Gray's Inn in 1938.

He served in the Gordon Highlanders and Royal Artillery from 1939 to 1946, being wounded in Italy, and was mentioned in dispatches. He reached the rank of lieutenant-colonel. Smith was attached to the Foreign Office in 1946–1947.

He was admitted to the Faculty of Advocates in Scotland in 1947. He obtained a DCL (Oxon) in 1956 and a LL.D from the University of Edinburgh in 1980. He was awarded an honorary doctorate (LLD) at the University of Cape Town.

In 1977 he was elected a Fellow of the Royal Society of Edinburgh. His proposers were John Cameron, Lord Cameron, Lord Balerno, George Murray Burnett and Anthony Elliot Ritchie and Sir Thomas Malcolm Knox. He was knighted by Queen Elizabeth II in the 1981 Birthday Honours.

He died in Edinburgh on 15 October 1988.

== Family ==
In 1940 he married Ann Dorothea Tindall. They had three children, a son who died in 1962 and two daughters, one of whom died in 1976.

His brother was Sir Robert Courtney Smith.

== Academic career ==
In 1949 he became Professor of Scots Law at the University of Aberdeen and was Dean of the Faculty of Law 1950-1953 and 1956–1958. In 1956 he became a Queen's Counsel. From 1958 to 1968 he was Professor of Civil Law at the University of Edinburgh and from 1968 to 1972 Professor of Scots Law. He was a part-time member of the Scottish Law Commission 1965-1972 and full-time 1972–1980. In 1980 he became the General Editor of the Laws of Scotland: Stair Memorial Encyclopedia. Professor Smith was visiting professor at Tulane University (Louisiana) 1958 and at Harvard Law School 1962-1963 and he was Tagore Professor, Calcutta, 1977. He was United Kingdom representative to committees of experts at the International Institute for the Unification of Private Law (UNIDROIT) and the Council of Europe. He has been described as one of the most influential, interesting and controversial figures in the development of modern Scots law.

== Published works ==
Smith published a large number of works on legal subjects. Among those were:

- Doctrines of Judicial Precedent in Scots Law (1952)
- Scotland: The Development of its Laws and Constitution (1955)
- British Justice: The Scottish Contribution (1961)
- Studies Critical and Comparative (1962)
- A Short Commentary on the Law of Scotland (1962)
- Property Problems in Sale (1978)
- Basic Rights and their Enforcement (1979).

== Artistic recognition ==
His portrait in office, by Tim Cockburn, is held by the University of Edinburgh.
