= Peregrine Bertie (died 1711) =

British politician

Peregrine Bertie DL (ca. 1663 – 10 July 1711) was a British politician, the second son of Robert Bertie, 3rd Earl of Lindsey.

Educated at the Middle Temple in 1679, Bertie first entered the House of Commons in 1685 in Boston, alongside his brother, Lord Willoughby de Eresby, and generally inclined towards the Tories. On 20 June 1685, he was commissioned a cornet in Lord Willoughby's independent troop of horse, raised to suppress the Monmouth Rebellion. In 1689, Bertie did not choose to stand for Parliament, and Sir William Yorke, a Whig, was returned alongside Lord Willoughby. In 1690, when Lord Willoughby was called to the House of Lords by writ of acceleration, Peregrine was returned at the ensuing by-election. However, he now showed leanings towards the Whigs, and solicited his half-uncle's brother-in-law, Hon. Thomas Wharton, to rally Nonconformists on his behalf.

When his younger brother, Norris, died in 1691, he appealed to the King, through his uncle the Marquess of Carmarthen, to obtain Norris' commission as a guidon and major in the 2nd Troop of Horse Guards for himself. Peregrine did not obtain his brother's commission, but was rewarded with a Court appointment in 1692 as Vice-Chamberlain to Queen Mary, after Jack Howe was turned out of office. Despite this, he regularly opposed the administration in Parliament.

He was appointed Vice-Chamberlain of the Household in 1694, perhaps to encourage his loyalty to the Court. Over the next few years, he continued to slowly move into the Whig orbit, and was made a Privy Counsellor in 1695. The attainder of Sir John Fenwick in 1697 placed Bertie under severe political strain. Most of the Bertie family opposed the attainder; while it is unclear exactly what role Peregrine took, his conduct was sufficiently lukewarm to earn the severe displeasure of King William. His office as Vice-Chamberlain was saved through the intercession of Sunderland, the Chamberlain, but the incident appears to have stimulated him to complete his transition from Tory to Whig.

He did not stand for re-election in Boston in 1698, perhaps partly due to tensions with his father, who remained a Tory. However, after his father's death, he returned to Parliament in the December 1701 election with the support of his brother, now Earl of Lindsey. (Lindsey remained a Tory, however.)

In 1706, he exchanged offices with Thomas Coke, receiving the sinecure of a Teller of the Exchequer. Bertie died of apoplexy in 1711.

Parliament of England
Preceded by Sir Anthony Irby; Sir William Yorke	Member of Parliament for Boston; 1685–1689; With: Lord Willoughby de Eresby	Succeeded by Lord Willoughby de Eresby; Sir William Yorke
Preceded by Lord Willoughby de Eresby; Sir William Yorke	Member of Parliament for Boston; 1690–1698; With: Sir William Yorke	Succeeded by Richard Wynn; Edmund Boulter
Preceded by Edmund Boulter; Sir William Yorke	Member of Parliament for Boston; 1701–1705; With: Sir William Yorke 1701–1702; Edward Irby 1702–1705	Succeeded by Edward Irby; Richard Wynn
Preceded by Henry Vincent; Hugh Boscawen	Member of Parliament for Truro; 1705–1707; With: Henry Vincent	Succeeded by Parliament of Great Britain
Parliament of Great Britain
Preceded by Parliament of England	Member of Parliament for Truro; 1707–1708; With: Henry Vincent	Succeeded by Henry Vincent; James Brydges
Preceded by Edward Irby; Richard Wynn	Member of Parliament for Boston; 1708–1711; With: Richard Wynn	Succeeded by Richard Wynn; William Cotesworth
Political offices
Preceded by Sir John Lowther	Vice-Chamberlain of the Household; 1694–1706	Succeeded by Thomas Coke
Preceded by Thomas Coke	Teller of the Exchequer; 1706–1711	Succeeded by Viscount Dupplin
