= Charles Amcotts =

British politician (1729–1777)

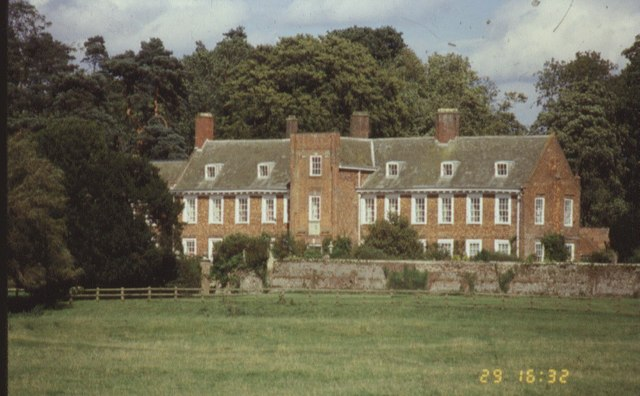
Harrington Hall, Lincolnshire

Charles Amcotts (1729–1777), was a British politician who sat in the House of Commons between 1754 and 1777.

== Early life ==
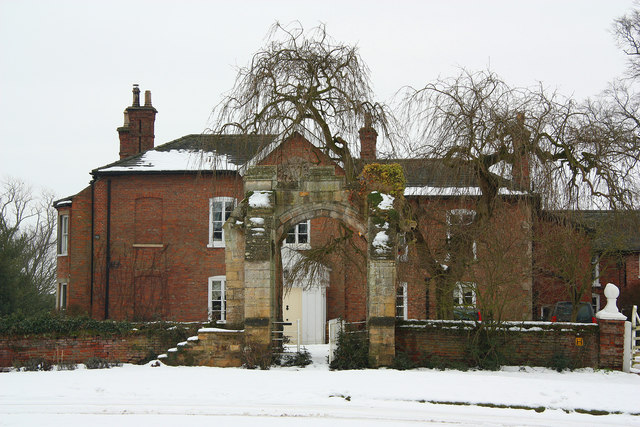
Kettlethorpe Hall, Lincolnshire

Amcotts was the son of Vincent Amcotts and his wife Elizabeth Quincey, daughter of John Quincey of Aslackby, Lincolnshire and was baptised 25 June 1729. He was admitted at Trinity Hall, Cambridge on 29 April 1746 but was expelled on 9 June 1749 for drinking the health of the Young Pretender. In 1763 he was created DCL at Oxford University. He inherited the Lincolnshire properties of Harrington Hall from his father and Kettlethorpe Hall from his father's step-brother and was picked High Sheriff of Lincolnshire for 1753–54.

== Political career ==
In the 1754 general election Amcotts was returned unopposed as Member of Parliament for Boston. He considered sitting for Lincoln in 1761 but did not stand at either seat at the 1761 general election. He was returned unopposed as MP for Boston at a by-election of December 1766 and re-elected in the 1774 general election. Also in 1774 he was alderman of Boston and was sometime colonel of the Lincoln Militia. He was described as a notorious Jacobite and furious courtier, but is not recorded as having spoken in the house.

== Later life ==
Amcotts died unmarried on 14 April 1777. Kettlethorpe passed to his sister Anna-Maria, the wife of Sir Wharton Emerson (who duly changed his name to Amcotts) and Harrington went to his sister Frances, the wife of Edward Buckworth.

Parliament of Great Britain
Preceded by Lord Vere Bertie; John Michell	Member of Parliament for Boston; 1754–1761; With: Lord Robert Bertie	Succeeded by Lord Robert Bertie; John Michell
Preceded by Lord Robert Bertie; John Michell	Member of Parliament for Boston; 1766–1777; With: Lord Robert Bertie	Succeeded by Lord Robert Bertie; Humphrey Sibthorp
