= Wentworth baronets of West Bretton (1664) =

Escutcheon of the Wentworth baronets of West Bretton

The Wentworth baronetcy, of West Bretton in the County of York, was created in the Baronetage of England on 27 September 1664 for Thomas Wentworth, a Royalist cavalry officer of the English Civil War.

The 4th Baronet sat as Member of Parliament for Malton from 1731 to 1741. The title became extinct on the death of the 5th Baronet in 1792.

== Wentworth baronets, of West Bretton (1664) ==
- Sir Thomas Wentworth, 1st Baronet (c. 1615–1675)
- Sir Matthew Wentworth, 2nd Baronet (died 1678), brother
- Sir Matthew Wentworth, 3rd Baronet (c. 1665–1706)
- Sir William Wentworth, 4th Baronet (1686–1763)
- Sir Thomas Wentworth Blackett, 5th Baronet (1726–1792)

== Notes ==
Baronetage of England
| Preceded by Loraine baronets | Wentworth baronets of West Bretton; 27 September 1664 | Succeeded by Biddulph baronets |
