= Richard Wynn (1656–1719) =

English politician (1656–1719)

Richard Wynn (1656 – 26 October 1719) was an English Tory politician. He sat as MP for Boston from 1698 till 1700 and 1705 till his death on 26 October 1719.

He was baptised on 19 March 1656. He was the son and heir of Richard Wynn (died 1689) and Joyce. He was educated at St Paul's School and admitted into Christ's College, Cambridge in 1673. In 1676, he entered the Middle Temple. On 24 August 1676, he married his first wife, Dorothy, the daughter of George Weldon by whom he had one daughter who predeceased him. On 7 May 1696, he married his second wife, Sarah, the daughter of Richard Young and widow of William Barrington by whom he had three sons (one predeceased him) and probably three daughters (one probably predeceased him).
