= George Whichcot =

British politician

- Born: Lincolnshire, East Midlands, Kingdom of England
- Baptised: 8 June 1653
- Died: 5 September 1720 (aged 67); Lincolnshire, East Midlands, Kingdom of Great Britain

George Whichcot (bapt. 8 June 1653 - 5 September 1720) was a British politician, MP in the House of Commons for Lincolnshire from 1698 to 1700 and from 1705 to 1710.

== Biography ==
George Whichcot was born in Fotherby, Lincolnshire to Sir William Whichcot and Margaret Clifton. He was baptised on 8 June 1653.

George Whichcot married Frances Whichcot (née Boynton) in 1698. That same year he became an MP of the Parliament of England for Westminster (3rd. Parliament of William III of England, 1698 to 1700). His views from this time remain rather uncertain.

In 1707 Sidney Godolphin indicated that Whichcot "did take part in the last war", as Whichcot was a captain under George Saunderson, 5th Viscount Castleton from 1690 to 1692. Whichcot was referred to as 'Colonel' in his later years.

Again elected in 1705, Whichcot, who was now a Whig, kept his place until 1710. At the time of the General elections of 1710, he was against two Tory candidates, and with his campaign suffering from a shortage of money, he ended up losing. Whichcot didn't stand as a candidate in the later elections. He was granted an annual pension of £400 in 1718. Whichcot died on 5 September 1720 in Lincolnshire and was buried on 9 September.
