= Robert Bertie, 3rd Earl of Lindsey =

English nobleman

The Right Honourable The Earl of Lindsey

Personal details
- Born: 8 November 1630
- Died: 8 May 1701 (aged 70)
- Spouse(s): Mary Massingberd; Hon. Elizabeth Wharton; Lady Elizabeth Pope
- Children: 8
- Parent(s): Montagu Bertie, 2nd Earl of Lindsey; Martha Ramsay (née Cockayne), Dowager Countess of Holderness

Robert Bertie, 3rd Earl of Lindsey PC FRS (8 November 1630 – 8 May 1701), styled Lord Willoughby de Eresby from 1642 to 1666, was an English nobleman.

He was the son of Montagu Bertie, 2nd Earl of Lindsey and Martha Cokayne. He travelled on the Continent, in France and Italy from 1647 to 1652, attending the University of Padua in 1651.

He contested Boston in 1661 and was returned to the Cavalier Parliament, in which he sat until he succeeded his father as Earl of Lindsey and Lord Great Chamberlain in 1666.

Lindsey had inherited an electoral interest at Stamford, on which his brother Peregrine had been returned since 1665. In a 1677 by-election, Lindsey treated the voters lavishly and secured the election of his candidate against that of the 4th Earl of Exeter, heretofore the predominant interest in the borough. For a brief period, both Peregrine and their younger brother Charles Bertie sat for the borough, but the Exclusion crisis in 1679 temporarily destroyed Lindsey's influence and both were turned out. Lindsey's brothers regained both seats at the 1685 election, but in 1689, he compromised with the 5th Earl of Exeter and each chose one member, Lindsey's brother Charles holding the seat until 1711. In 1694, he put in his younger son Philip at a by-election alongside Charles, but the Exeter interest put up a candidate again in 1698 and Philip did not stand.

== Marriages ==
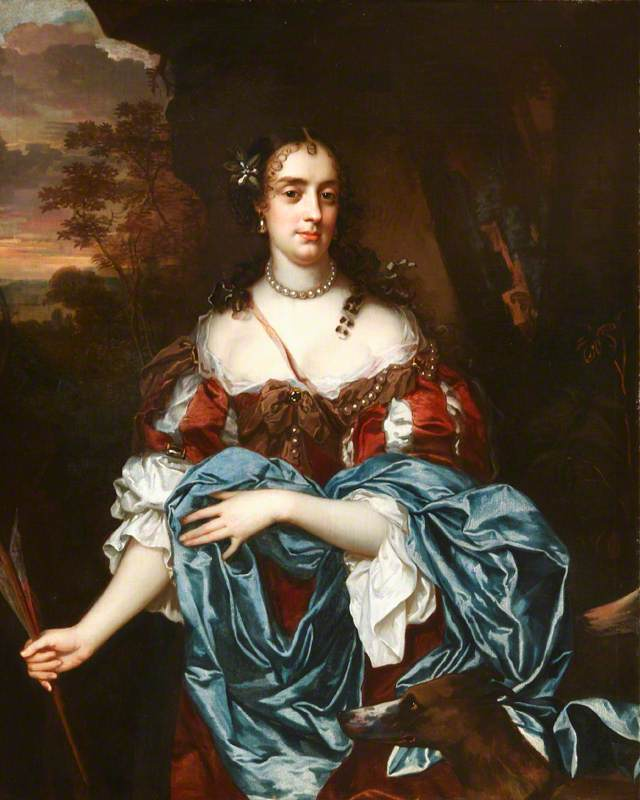
Lady Elizabeth Pope (1660–1719), Lady Lee, later Countess of Lindsey, as Diana

In 1654, he married Mary Massingberd, who died in the late 1650s, after bearing him one daughter:

- Lady Arabella Bertie (d. 28 February 1716), married Thomas Savage, 3rd Earl Rivers.

Before 1660, he married again to Elizabeth Wharton (d. 1669), daughter of Philip Wharton, 4th Baron Wharton, by whom he had five children:

- Robert Bertie, 1st Duke of Ancaster and Kesteven (1660–1723)
- Rt. Hon. Peregrine Bertie (c. 1663–1711)
- Hon. Philip Bertie (c. 1664–1728), married Elizabeth Brabazon, daughter of William Brabazon, 3rd Earl of Meath, without issue
- Hon. Norris Bertie (c. 1666 – 27 August 1691)
- Hon. Albemarle Bertie (c. 1668–1742)

In about 1670, he married a third time, to Lady Elizabeth Pope, daughter of Thomas Pope, 2nd Earl of Downe and widow of Sir Francis Lee, 4th Baronet. By her he had two children:

- Hon. Charles Bertie (c. 1683–1727)
- Lady Elizabeth Bertie, died unmarried

Parliament of England
Preceded by Sir Anthony Irby; Thomas Hatcher	Member of Parliament for Boston; 1661–1666; With: Sir Anthony Irby	Succeeded by Sir Anthony Irby; Sir Philip Harcourt
Political offices
Preceded by The Earl of Lindsey	Lord Great Chamberlain; 1666–1701	Succeeded by The Duke of Ancaster and Kesteven
Honorary titles
Preceded by The Earl of Lindsey	Lord Lieutenant of Lincolnshire; 1666–1700	Succeeded by Lord Willoughby de Eresby
Peerage of England
Preceded by Montagu Bertie	Earl of Lindsey; 1666–1701	Succeeded by Robert Bertie
Preceded by Montagu Bertie	Baron Willoughby de Eresby (descended by acceleration); 1666–1690	Succeeded by Robert Bertie
