= John Selwyn (c. 1709–1751) =

English politician

John Selwyn (c. 1709–1751) was an English politician.

He was a Member of Parliament (MP) for Whitchurch from 1734 to 27 June 1751.
